= Sabio =

Sabio is a surname. Notable people with the surname include:

- Camilo Sabio (born 1936), Filipino politician and lawyer
- Guadalupe Sabio (born 1977), Spanish scientist
- Jason Sabio (born 1986), Filipino soccer player
- Raymundo Taco Sabio (1946–2022), Filipino Roman Catholic priest
