= 1977 Guamanian gambling referendum =

Guamanian ballot measures

A referendum on legalising casinos and slot machines was held in Guam on 16 April 1977, alongside elections to a Constitutional Convention and the Board of Education.

The proposals were rejected by around three-quarters of voters, with voter turnout at around 53%.

== Background ==
Bills legalising a government-owned casino and allowing slot machines in controlled areas of the transit lounge at Guam International Airport were approved by the Legislature in 1976. Both laws were vetoed by Governor Ricardo Bordallo, who was opposed to gambling. As a result, a referendum was held on the proposals, with voters asked whether they approved of three separate proposals; allowing unlimited legalised casinos, allowing one government-owned casino, and legalising slot machines.

== Campaign ==
A pro-gambling campaign called Ayuda Guam ("Help the Island") was established by a group of businessmen. It spent around $100,000 on its campaign, sending out direct mails, running advertisements in newspapers, radio and television, and hiring a political consultant from the United States who had been credited with helping legalise gambling in Atlantic City.

The Roman Catholic Archdiocese of Agaña and Bishop of Guam Felixberto Camacho Flores opposed the operation of casinos, claiming it would increase crime and gambling addiction.
