= Apostolic Prefecture of Mariana Islands =

Roman Catholic missionary jurisdiction in Micronesia (1902–1911)

The Apostolic Prefecture of Mariana Islands was a Roman Catholic apostolic prefecture (early missionary stage of a diocese) in Micronesia, in the South Sea.

== History ==
It was established on 17 September 1902 in Guam, on territory previously belonging to the Diocese of Cebu (Philippines). It was exempt, i.e. directly dependent on the Holy See, never part of an ecclesiastical province.

It was suppressed on 1 March 1911, in order to create from its territory the Apostolic Vicariate of Mariana and Caroline Islands (from which sprung the Diocese of the Caroline Islands and the Apostolic Prefecture of the Marshall Islands) and the Apostolic Vicariate of Guam (which became the Metropolitan Archdiocese of Agana, to which both aforementioned are suffragan).

== See also ==
- Religion in Oceania
