= Martin Joseph Neylon =

Roman Catholic bishop

Martin Joseph Neylon S.J.
- Bishop of Caroline Islands
- Church: Catholic Church
- Diocese: Diocese of Caroline Islands
- In office: September 20, 1971 – May 25, 1995
- Predecessor: Vincent Ignatius Kennally
- Successor: Amando Samo
- Previous posts: Titular Bishop of Libertina (1969-1979); Coadjutor Vicar Apostolic for Caroline and Marshall Islands (1969-1971)

Orders
- Ordination: June 18, 1950 by Francis Patrick Keough
- Consecration: February 2, 1970 by Terence Cooke

Personal details
- Born: February 13, 1920 Buffalo, New York, United States
- Died: April 13, 2004 (aged 84)

Martin Joseph Neylon (February 13, 1920 – April 13, 2004) was a Roman Catholic bishop.

Born in Buffalo, New York, Neylon was ordained to the priesthood, for the Society of Jesus, on June 18, 1950. On October 9, 1970, Neylon was appointed coadjutor vicar apostolic of the Caroline and Marshall Islands and titular bishop of Libertina and was ordained bishop on February 2, 1971. On May 3, 1979, he was appointed bishop of the new Diocese of Caroline-Marshalls. Then on April 23, 1993, the name of the diocese was changed to the Diocese of Caroline Islands. On May 25, 1995, Neylon retired.
