= Postmaster =

Head of a post office

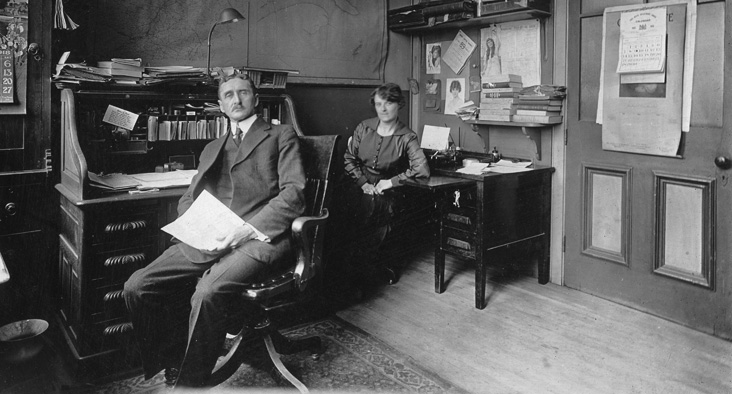
The postmaster of Sherbrooke, Quebec, in 1918

A postmaster is the head of an individual post office, responsible for all postal activities in a specific post office. When a postmaster is responsible for an entire mail distribution organization (usually sponsored by a national government), the title of Postmaster General is commonly used. Responsibilities of a postmaster typically include management of a centralized mail distribution facility, establishment of letter carrier routes, supervision of letter carriers and clerks, and enforcement of the organization's rules and procedures. The postmaster is the representative of the Postmaster General in that post office.

In Canada, many early places are named after the first postmaster.

== History ==
In the days of horse-drawn carriages, a postmaster was an individual from whom horses and/or riders (known as postilions or "post-boys") could be hired. The postmaster would reside in a "post house".

The first Postmaster General of the United States was the founding father Benjamin Franklin.

In England, King Henry VIII appointed Sir Brian Tuke as the first "Master of the Posts" in 1516 to establish a formal postal network.

== United States ==
An appointed position, postmasters were prized offices for political party members as they helped keep your political representatives in power. The appointment and removal of most postmasters was handled by the First Assistant United States Postmaster General in Washington, D.C., while postmasters who earned more than $1,000 annually were nominated by the president of the United States and confirmed by the U.S. Senate. The system was often a patronage system, whereby the postmasters would get jobs in an informal way by the party in power.

Historically in the United States, women served as postmasters since the American Revolutionary War and even earlier, under British rule, more than a century before they won the right to vote. The wave of female postmasters appointed during the late 19th century had been a crucial element for women's broader entry into the federal government system.

Many postmasters are members of a management organization that consults with the United States Postal Service (USPS) for compensation and policy. On November 1, 2016, the two organizations, the National Association of Postmasters of the United States (NAPUS) and the National League of Postmasters, merged to form the United Postmasters and Managers of America (UPMA).

Level of pay is based on deliveries and revenue of the post office. Levels are from EAS (Executive and Administrative Service) 18 through 26. Smaller remotely managed post offices no longer have postmasters and report to a nearby larger office. Larger metropolitan post offices are PCES (Postal Career Executive Service).

== Notable postmasters ==
- Madison Davis, first African American postmaster in Athens, Georgia
- Benjamin Franklin, founding father
- Mary Katherine Goddard, only known woman Postmaster when Benjamin Franklin was named the first American Postmaster General
- François Jaupain, postmaster-general in the Southern Netherlands during the War of the Spanish Succession, who operated a Cabinet noir
- Abraham Lincoln, US president that abolished slavery
- Monroe Morton, African American Postmaster of Georgia
- Isaac Nichols, first postmaster of Australia's post
- Tammy Flores Garman Schoenen, first female postmaster of Guam.
- Helen J. Stewart, first postmaster of Las Vegas, Nevada.
- Alexandrine von Taxis, German Imperial General Postmaster of the Kaiserliche Reichspost
- Gese Wechel, first female postmaster in Sweden
- Benjamin F. Stapleton, mayor of Denver
- Minnie M. Cox, first known African American female postmaster.

== See also ==
- Postmaster General
  - Postmaster General of the United Kingdom
  - United States Postmaster General
- Mail carrier
