= Ryan Jimenez =

Filipino Catholic priest and bishop

His Excellency, The Most Reverend Ryan Jimenez
- Archbishop of Agaña
- Archdiocese: Agaña
- Appointed: July 6, 2024
- Installed: August 15, 2024
- Predecessor: Michael J. Byrnes
- Previous post: Bishop of Chalan Kanoa (2016-2024)

Orders
- Ordination: June 8, 2003 by Tomas A. Camacho
- Consecration: August 14, 2016 by Savio Hon, Tomas A. Camacho, and Julito Cortes

Personal details
- Born: Ryan Pagente Jimenez; December 18, 1971 (age 54) Dumaguete, Negros Oriental, Philippines
- Education: Saint Patrick's Seminary and University
- Motto: Volumus Iesum videre (We would like to see Jesus)

Styles of Ryan Jimenez
- Reference style: His Excellency; The Most Reverend
- Spoken style: Your Excellency
- Religious style: Bishop

Ryan Pagente Jimenez (born December 18, 1971) is a Filipino-born Catholic prelate who has served as Archbishop of Agaña in Guam since 2024.

== Biography ==
Coat of arms as bishop of Chalan Kanoa

=== Early life ===
Ryan Jimenez was born in Dumaguete, Philippines, on December 18, 1971, one of four children born to Rogelio and Lilia Jimenez. He grew up on the island of Siquijor, attending Larena Elementary School there from 1978 to 1984. Deciding to become a priest, Jimenez then entered Saint Joseph Seminary in Negros Oriental, studying there for four years. He entered the San José Major Seminary on the campus of Ateneo de Manila University, Quezon City, and earned his bachelor's degree in 1992.

As a member of the Jesuits Volunteers Philippines he worked as a community organizer in the southern Philippines for a year. From 1993 to 1995, he taught at a Jesuit high school in Cebu City, Sacred Heart School for Boys. He then fulfilled his first assignment in the Northern Marianas, teaching from 1995 to 1997 at Eskuelan San Francisco de Borja, a small Catholic school on the island of Rota. He completed his studies in preparation for ordination at Saint Patrick's Seminary and University in Menlo Park, California, earning by 2003 a Bachelor of Arts degree in sacred theology and master's degrees in divinity and in theology.

=== Priesthood ===
On June 8, 2003, Jimenez was ordained to the priesthood for the Diocese of Chalan Kanoa by Bishop Tomas Aguon Camacho in Our Lady of Mount Carmel Cathedral in Chalan Kanoa.

He next served at Kristo Rai Church in Garapan village on the island of Saipan from 2003 to 2007. His other assignments included terms as a member of the priests’ council, personal secretary to the bishop from 2003 to 2010, spiritual director of the Cursillo movement from 2005 to 2007, rector of the cathedral parish in 2007/08, president of the diocesan commission for the cultural heritage of the Church in 2008/09, and diocesan chancellor in 2009/10. He was also editor of the weekly diocesan newspaper, and Superintendent of Catholic schools.

He was apostolic administrator of the diocese from December 28, 2010 to June 24, 2016.

=== Bishop of Chalan Kanoa ===
Pope Francis appointed Jimenez the bishop of Chalan Kanoa on June 24, 2016. On August 14, 2016, he was consecrated at Our Lady of Mount Carmel Cathedral as bishop by Archbishop Savio Tai Fai Hon, secretary of the Congregation for the Evangelization of Peoples. On the morning of his consecration, a cycling event called Bike The Faith celebrated his efforts to build interfaith community.

Jimenez ran several marathons while bishop, beginning with the Honolulu Marathon in Honolulu, Hawaii in 2016, then the New York City Marathon in 2017, the Bordeaux Marathon in Bordeaux, France, in 2019, and the Chicago Marathon in Chicago, Illinois, in 2021.

Jimenez continued to further his education through Fordham University's Graduate School of Religion and Religious Education, which provides electronic outreach to hard-to-reach communities. He said he needed to learn about accompanying diverse communities, both the LGBT community and the migrants from diverse traditions who feel unwelcome in unfamiliar institutions.

In November 2023, he was elected president of the Episcopal Conference of the Pacific (CEPAC). In May 2024, he was elected vice president of a larger umbrella organization, Federation of Catholic Bishops Conferences of Oceania (FCBCO).

=== Appointment as Archbishop ===
On July 6, 2024, Pope Francis appointed Jimenez as archbishop of Agaña in Guam, its ninth ordinary and its fourth metropolitan archbishop. He was installed on August 15, 2024, the Solemnity of the Assumption of the Blessed Virgin Mary at the Dulce Nombre de Maria Cathedral Basilica in Hagåtña.

== See also ==
- Catholic Church hierarchy
- Catholic Church in the United States
- Historical list of the Catholic bishops of the United States
- List of Catholic bishops of the United States
- Lists of patriarchs, archbishops, and bishops

Catholic Church titles
Preceded by Michael J. Byrnes	Archbishop of Agaña; 2024–present	Incumbent
Preceded by Tomas Aguon Camacho	Bishop of Chalan Kanoa; 2016–2024	Succeeded by Vacant
