= Thomas John Feeney =

Thomas John Feeney S.J.
- Vicar Apostolic of Caroline and Marshall Islands
- Church: Catholic Church
- See: Apostolic Vicariate of Caroline and Marshall Islands
- In office: May 10, 1951 – September 9, 1955
- Predecessor: Santiago López de Rego y Labarta
- Successor: Vincent Ignatius Kennally
- Other post: Titular Bishop of Agnus (1951-1955)

Orders
- Ordination: June 23, 1927 by John J. Collins
- Consecration: September 8, 1951 by Richard Cushing

Personal details
- Born: September 4, 1894 Jamaica Plain, Boston, Massachusetts, United States
- Died: September 9, 1955 (aged 61)

Thomas John Feeney (September 4, 1894 – September 9, 1955) was a Roman Catholic bishop.

Born in Jamaica Plain, Boston, Massachusetts, Feeney was ordained a priest for the Society of Jesus June 23, 1929. On May 10, 1951, Feeney was appointed Vicar Apostolic of Carolina and Marshall Island and titular bishop of Angus and was ordained bishop on September 8, 1951.
