= Tomas Aguon Camacho =

First Bishop of the Roman Catholic Diocese of Chalan Kanoa

His Excellency, The Most Reverend Tomas Aguon Camacho
- Bishop of Chalan Kanoa (1985 - 2010)
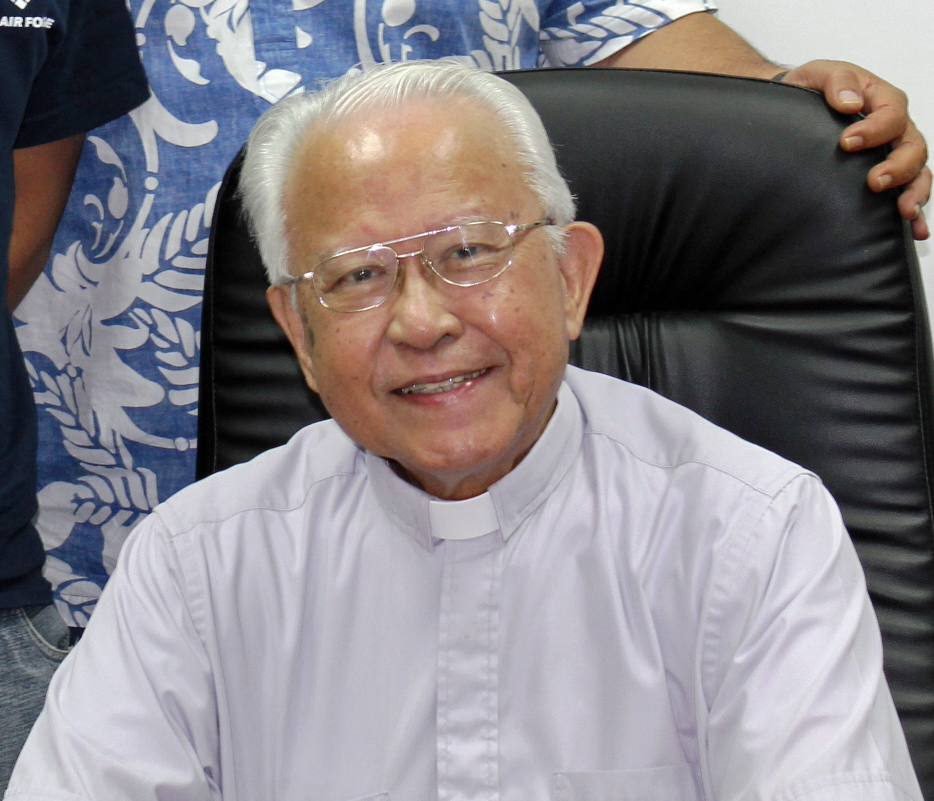
- Archdiocese: Agaña
- Diocese: Chalan Kanoa
- Appointed: November 8, 1984
- Installed: January 13, 1985
- Term ended: April 6, 2010
- Predecessor: Diocese created
- Successor: Ryan Pagente Jimenez

Orders
- Ordination: June 14, 1961
- Consecration: January 13, 1985

Personal details
- Born: Tomas Aguon Camacho; September 18, 1933 Chalan Kanoa, Saipan, Mariana Islands, South Pacific Mandate
- Died: March 5, 2018 (aged 84) Commonwealth Health Center, Garapan, Saipan, Northern Mariana Islands, U.S.A.
- Buried: Our Lady of Mount Carmel Cathedral
- Denomination: Roman Catholic
- Occupation: Bishop
- Education: Fr. Duenas Memorial School; Saint Patrick's Seminary
- Motto: Fiat Voluntas Tua ("Your Will be Done")

Styles of Tomas Aguon Camacho
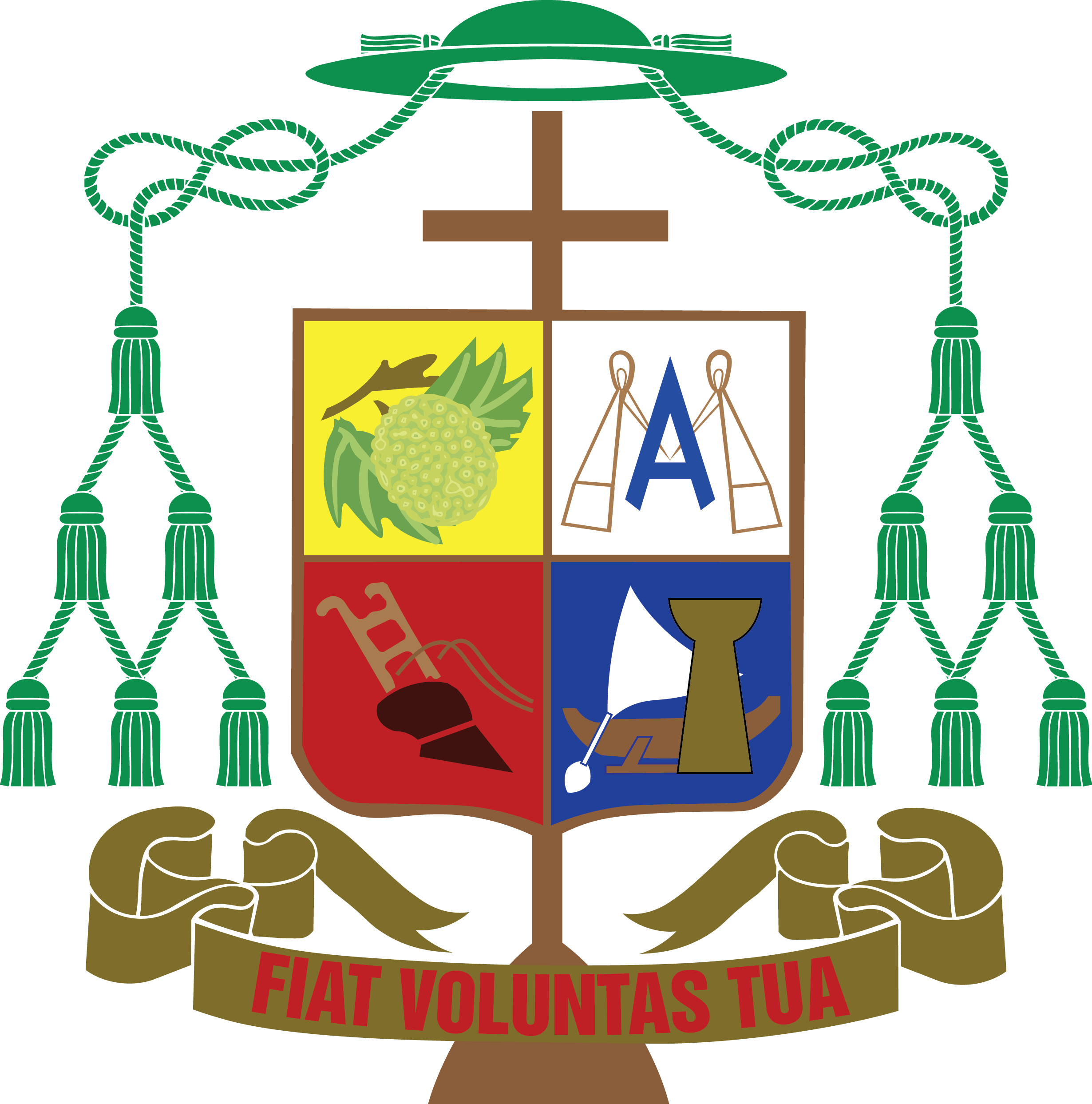
- Reference style: His Excellency; The Most Reverend
- Spoken style: Your Excellency
- Posthumous style: Bishop Emeritus

Tomas Aguon Camacho (September 18, 1933 – March 5, 2018) was the first Bishop of the Roman Catholic Diocese of Chalan Kanoa in the Northern Mariana Islands. He served for 25 years as bishop from 1985 until his retirement in 2010.

== Biography ==
Camacho was born in Chalan Kanoa, Saipan, on September 18, 1933, to Vidal Palacios Camacho and Maria Aguon Camacho. He was ordained a Catholic priest on June 14, 1961, at the age of 27.

=== Bishop ===
Camacho was appointed the first bishop of the newly created Roman Catholic Diocese of Chalan Kanoa on November 8, 1984, by Pope John Paul II. He was consecrated on January 13, 1985.

Camacho served as Bishop until his retirement on April 6, 2010, at the age of 76. Immediately after his retirement, he was named bishop emeritus of the diocese. He was eventually succeeded by Ryan Pagente Jimenez, who was ordained as the new bishop on August 14, 2016.

=== Sexual abuse lawsuit ===
In February 2017, a lawsuit was filed against Camacho by a man claiming that he was sexual abused by the former Bishop between 1971 and 1974 when he was serving as a priest at the Nuestra Senora de las Aguas Catholic Church in Mongmong, Guam. In April 2019, a second person filed a lawsuit against Camacho claiming that he was sexually abused by Camacho at the Mongmong church in the early 1962. The Archdiocese of Agaña, which previously had direct jurisdiction over not only Guam but all of the other Mariana Islands as well, was also named as a co-defendant in the lawsuits as well.

=== Death ===
Camacho died on Monday, March 5, 2018, at the Commonwealth Health Center, Garapan, on the island of Saipan at the age of 84. He was honored by the local community, and buried on Tuesday, March 13, 2018, beneath the sanctuary of the Mount Carmel Cathedral in Saipan.
