= Francisco Xavier Vilá y Mateu =

The Most Reverend Francisco Xavier Ricardo Vilá y Mateu OFMCap
- Vicar Apostolic of Guam
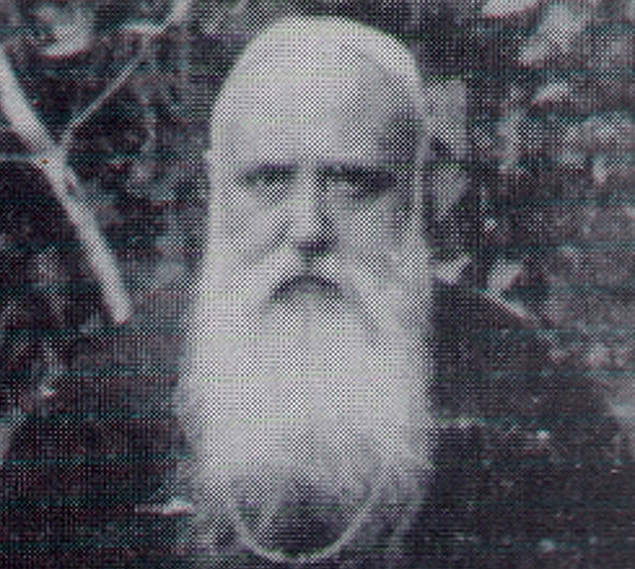
- Native name: Ricardo Vilá y Mateu
- See: Vicariate Apostolic of Guam
- Installed: 25 August 1911
- Term ended: 1 January 1913
- Successor: Agustín José Bernaus y Serra

Orders
- Ordination: 24 August 1875
- Consecration: 1 October 1911

Personal details
- Born: Ricardo Vilá y Mateu; 9 May 1851 Arenys de Mar, Barcelona, Catalonia, Spain
- Died: 1 January 1913 Hagåtña, Guam, United States
- Denomination: Roman Catholicism

Francisco Xavier Ricardo Vilá y Mateu, OFMCap (9 May 1851 – 1 January 1913) was a Spanish Capuchin friar and bishop of the Catholic Church. He was the apostolic vicar of Guam from 1911 to 1913.

== Biography ==
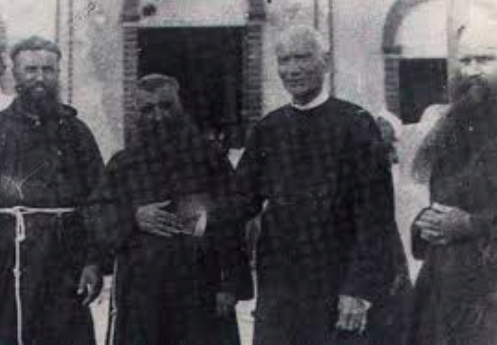
Vilá y Mateu in 1911 or 1912 with other Capuchins

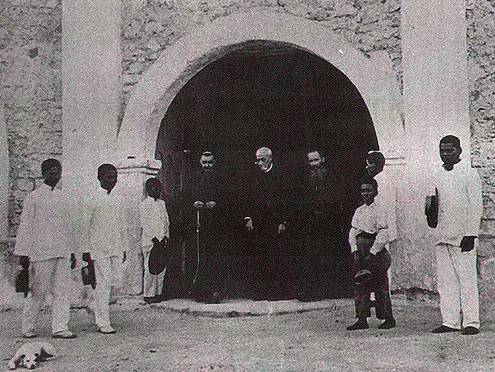
Vilá y Mateu in 1911 or 1912 with other Capuchins and some Guam natives

Ricardo Vilá y Mateu was born on 9 May 1851 in the small town of Arenys de Mar, Province of Barcelona in Catalonia, Spain. In his late teens, he decided to become a Capuchin friar, but the turbulent political situation caused him to pursue his vocation elsewhere. He moved to Guatemala in 1869 and entered a convent there, taking the religious name "Francisco Javier", in honor of Saint Francis Xavier. Vilá studied theology in Toulouse, France, and was ordained a priest on 24 August 1875 in Ecuador.

Vilá's was master of novices in Spain for the Capuchins. He then served as provincial definitor and provincial superior of its Aragon Province from 1889 to 1895 and of its Catalonia Province from 1900 to 1906.

On 25 August 1911, Pope Pius X appointed Vilá the first apostolic vicar of the Apostolic Vicariate of Guam and titular bishop of Adraa. He received his episcopal consecration on 1 October 1911 from Juan José Laguarda y Fenollera, Bishop of Barcelona, assisted by Francisco de Pol y Baralt, Bishop of Gerona, and Luis José Amigó y Ferrer, Apostolic Administrator of Solsona.

Prior to Vilá's appointment, the highest church official in Guam was a priest who managed the island's mission, usually a Jesuit, Augustinian Recollect, or a diocesan priest from the Archdiocese of Cebu in the Philippines. In 1910, German Capuchins were given responsibility for the mission, but social and political opposition made it impossible. The Holy See assigned the mission to the Spanish Capuchins instead and upgraded the mission to the status of an apostolic vicariate.

Vilá died suddenly on 1 January 1913 in Hagåtña, the village where the cathedral was located. He was buried the next day, the first Catholic bishop interred on Guam.
