= Michelle Lee =

Michele or Michelle Lee may refer to:

== Entertainment industry personalities ==
- Michele Lee (born 1942), American actress and singer
- Jennifer Michelle Lee (born 1971), American screenwriter and director at Disney
- Michelle Lee (actress) (born 1978), American martial artist and stuntwoman
- Michelle Lee (model) (born 1981), Miss World Australia runner-up, a/k/a Michelle Leslie
- Michelle Lee (singer) (born 1991), South Korean singer and music instructor

== Writers ==
- Michelle Lee (editor) (born 1975), American editor in chief of Allure
- Michelle Ye Hee Lee (born 1988), American journalist

== Others ==
- Michelle Lee (plastic surgeon), American plastic surgeon and television personality
- Michelle K. Lee (born 1965), American attorney and former head of Patent and Trademark Office
- Michelle-Lee Ahye (born 1992), Trinidadian sprinter

== Characters ==
- Michelle Lee (NCIS), American special agent played by Liza Lapira
