= Apollinaris William Baumgartner =

American prelate

The Most Reverend Apollinaris William Baumgartner, OFMCap
- Bishop of Agaña
- Church: Catholic Church
- See: Diocese of Agaña
- Installed: 14 August 1965
- Term ended: 18 December 1970
- Predecessor: León Angel Olano y Urteaga
- Successor: Felixberto Camacho Flores

Orders
- Ordination: 30 May 1926

Personal details
- Born: William Baumgartner; 24 July 1899 College Point, Queens, New York City, New York, United States
- Died: 18 December 1970 (aged 71) Hagåtña, Guam
- Buried: Hagåtña, Guam
- Coat of arms

Apollinaris William Baumgartner, OFMCap, D.D., (24 July 1899 – 18 December 1970) was a prelate of the Catholic Church, serving as Bishop of Agaña, Guam, from 1945 to 1970.

== Biography ==
=== Early life and education ===
William Baumgartner was born in College Point, Queens, New York City, New York, United States, to William Lawrence Baumgartner and Elizabeth (née Wurtz) Baumgartner. He attended St. Fidelis School, the parochial elementary school of St. Fidelis Parish in College Point, and already had decided to become a Capuchin friar by the time he was to start high school. He boarded at St. Lawrence College in Mount Calvary, Wisconsin, a seminary high school run by Capuchins. He later received a Doctor of Divinity.

=== Priesthood and episcopacy ===
Baumgartner was ordained a priest on 30 May 1926, taking the name Apollinaris in honour of many famous Catholic saints and bishops. On 25 August 1945, Pope Pius XII appointed him Vicar Apostolic of Guam and Titular Bishop of Ioppe. He was consecrated on 18 September 1945, with Archbishop Amleto Giovanni Cicognani, Titular Archbishop of Laodicea in Phrygia, serving as consecrator, and Bishop Eugene Joseph McGuinness, titular bishop of Ilium, and Bishop Bartholomew Joseph Eustace, Bishop of Camden, serving as co-consecrators.

He arrived in Guam on 23 October 1945, shortly after the end of the World War II aboard the personal plane of Admiral Chester W. Nimitz, who was leading the post-war military administration of the island. The apostolic vicariate was in ruins at that time, with most of Guam's churches damaged beyond repair. All American missionary priests were still captives in Japan, with only one Chamorro (native Guamanian) priest remaining, and zero Chamorro religious sisters. From 1947 to 1949, he concurrently served as the first Apostolic Administrator of Okinawa and the Southern Islands, Japan.

=== Work in education ===
Almost immediately after arriving on Guam, Baumgartner set to work reestablishing Catholic schools on the island, all of which had been destroyed in the war. He quickly arranged for religious sisters to set up houses on the island to staff his schools, while also hiring Chamorro lay teachers. This was a new trend in Catholic education on Guam, where for all of its history, most Catholic school teachers had been foreign-born priests and religious sisters. The schools were attended mostly by native Guamanian children, but also children of American military personnel. Besides founding schools, he was also active in acquiring scholarships for Chamorro children to Catholic seminaries, colleges, and universities on the mainland United States.

Some of the schools he founded are noted in detail as follows:

==== Father Dueñas Memorial School ====
On 1 October 1948, Baumgartner established Father Dueñas Memorial School as a seminary high school, named in honor of Father Jesus Baza Dueñas, a Chamorro priest executed by the Japanese during World War II. The Stigmatine Fathers arrived to administer and teach at the school, and 11 men made up the first graduating class in 1950.

==== Academy of Our Lady of Guam ====
Baumgartner founded the Academy of Our Lady of Guam on 8 September 1949 as the first all-girls high school on Guam and the second Catholic high school. It was administered by the Sisters of Mercy of Belmont, North Carolina, who provided three religious sisters, including Sister Mary Inez Underwood, RSM, the first principal.

==== Santa Barbara Catholic School ====
Santa Barbara Catholic School opened in September 1950 with grades 1-4 and 150 students. The school was part of Santa Barbara Parish and was run by the Sisters of Mercy.

==== St. Jude Thaddeus Junior High School & Cathedral Grade School (Bishop Baumgartner Memorial Catholic School) ====
In 1955, Baumgartner founded St. Jude Thaddeus Junior High School, a K-10 school staffed by six Franciscan Sisters of Perpetual Adoration from La Crosse, Wisconsin. Later, the ninth and tenth grades were eliminated, and in the 1980s, the school merged with Cathedral Grade School to form the new Bishop Baumgartner Memorial Catholic School, named in honor of the bishop who founded both of the merging schools.

=== Later life and death ===
On 14 October 1965, the Vicariate Apostolic of Guam was raised and renamed the Diocese of Agaña, and Apollinaris Baumgartner was appointed its first bishop. He reigned for five more years, before dying on 18 December 1970 in Hagåtña, the seat of the bishop. He advised Father Louis Brouillard to pray after Father Brouillard was accused of molesting over 20 boys on the Island of Guam.

== Legacy ==
Baumgartner is best remembered for creating Guam's Catholic education system, founding nearly a dozen schools in just a few years. Today, Bishop Baumgartner Memorial Catholic School, an elementary school created by a merger of two schools he founded, is named in his honor.

== Coat of arms ==
For his episcopal coat of arms, Baumgartner chose a phoenix as the main charge. The bird was chosen because of its mythological ability to be reborn out of ashes, which he believed would be representative of the future of his see on Guam.

== Bibliography ==
- Catholic Journalism: A Study of Its Development in the United States, 1789-1930 (1931, Columbia University Press)

Catholic Church titles
Preceded by León Angel Olano y Urteaga	Archbishop of Agana; 1965–1970	Succeeded by Felixberto Camacho Flores
