= CNIC =

CNIC may refer to:

- CNIC (Pakistan), Computerised National Identity Card
- Central nucleus of inferior colliculus
- Centre de Neurosciences Intégratives et Cognitives at the University of Bordeaux 1, France
- Citizens' Nuclear Information Center, Japan
- Commander, Navy Installations Command, United States
- Copernic (stock symbol), a web search technology company
- Spanish National Cardiovascular Research Centre (Centro nacional de investigaciones cardiovasculares)
