= Academy of Our Lady of Guam =

High School in Guam

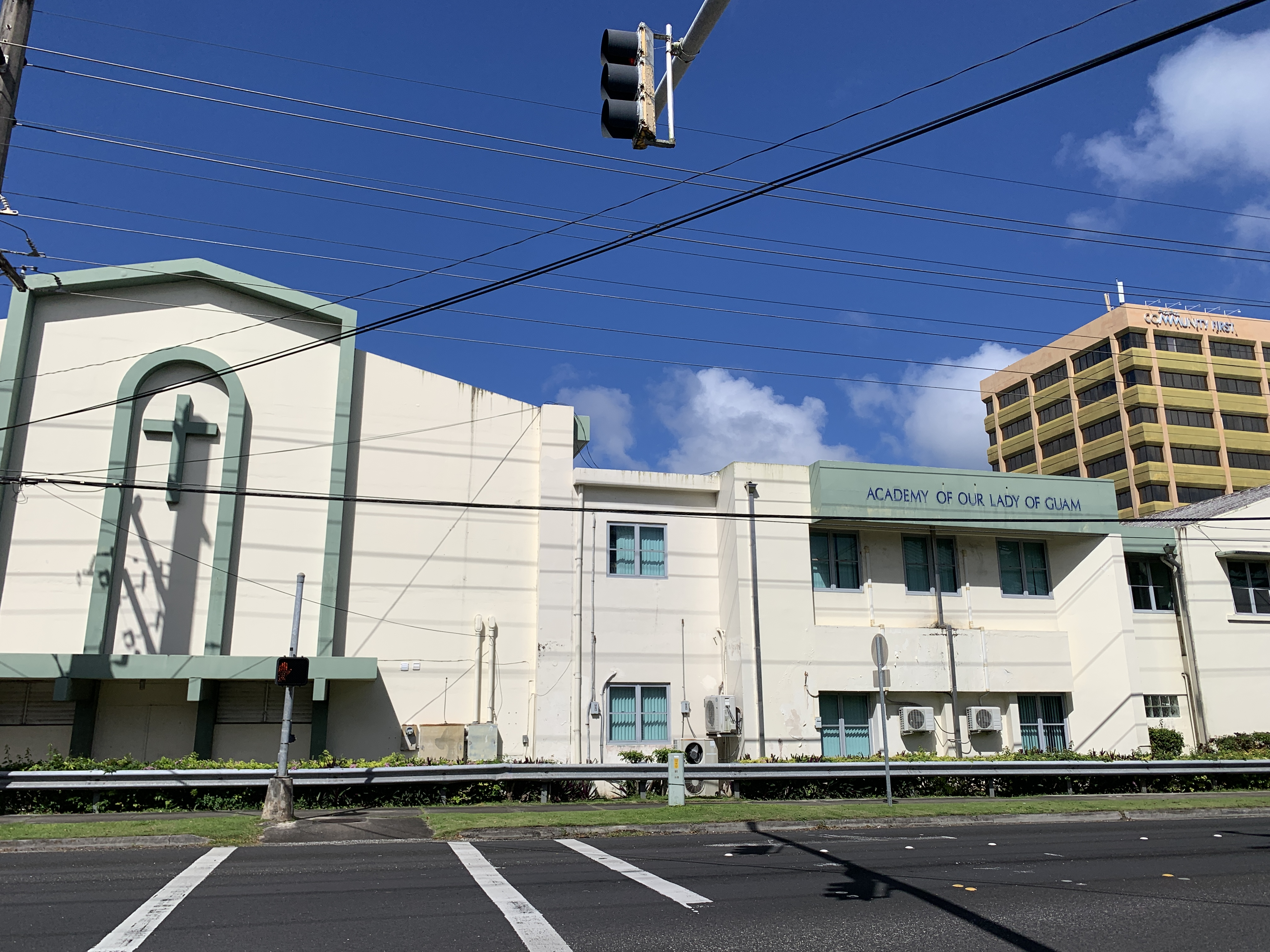

Location
- 233 Archbishop Felixberto C. Flores Street; Hagåtña, Guam 96910
- 13°28′23″N 144°45′11″E

Information
- Type: Private, Religious, College preparatory high school
- Religious affiliation: Roman Catholic
- Patron saint: Our Lady of Camarin
- Established: 1949
- Founder: Bishop Apollinaris William Baumgartner
- School district: Central
- President: Dr. Rita D. Duenas
- Dean: Ms. Lourdes Babauta (Ms.B)
- Principal: Mrs. Iris Gaza
- Grades: 9-12
- Gender: Female
- Colors: Blue, gray
- Athletics conference: Interscholastic Athletic Association of Guam (IIAAG)
- Mascot: Cougars
- Website: http://www.aolg.edu.gu/

Academy of Our Lady of Guam (AOLG) is an all-girls private Catholic high school located at 233 Archbishop Felixberto C. Flores Street in Hagåtña, Guam, United States. AOLG, Guam's sole all-girls high school, has an average yearly enrollment of 400 students.

In 2004 it was awarded the highest medal of recognition from the Archdiocese of Agaña. The school is accredited by the Western Association of Schools and Colleges.

The school has several clubs and organizations: Student Council, National Honor Society, Model United Nations, Mock Trial, and National Forensics League.

== History ==
Bishop Appolinaris William Baumgartner, OFM Cap. and Sister Inez Underwood, RSM established the Academy of Our Lady of Guam on September 8, 1949.

== Leadership ==
=== Principals ===
1. Sr. Mary Inez Underwood, RSM (1949–1953)
2. Sr. Mary Roberta Taitano, RSM (1953–?)
3. Sr. Mary Mark Martinez, RSM (?–1965–1966)
4. Sr. Evelyn Muna, RSM (1966–1967)
5. Sr. Marie Pierre Martinez, RSM (1967–1968–?)
6. Sr. Francis Jerome Cruz, RSM (?–1973–1974–?)
7. Sr. Mary Helene Torres, RSM (?–1982–1984
8. Sr. Mary Angela Perez, RSM (1984–1990)
9. Sr. Francis Jerome Cruz, RSM (1990–2004)
10. Mary A. Terlaje Meeks '69 (2004–2020)
11. Iris Gaza '00 (2020–Present)

=== Presidents ===
1. Sr. Francis Jerome Cruz, RSM (2004–2015)
2. Sr. Angela Perez, RSM (2015–2022)
3. Dr. Rita D. Duenas (2022–Present)

== Notable alumni ==
- Joann G. Camacho - Businesswoman and former First Lady of Guam.
- Yuri Kim - Korean-born American diplomat.
- Lourdes Leon Guerrero, current Governor of Guam
- Sabina Perez, educator and politician.
- Antoinette D. Sanford, businesswoman and politician.
- Therese M. Terlaje, politician
- Tammy Flores Garman Schoenen - First female postmaster of Guam.
- Mary Camacho Torres, politician
- Chantelle Wong, current U.S. Director of the Asian Development Bank
- Michelle Ye Hee Lee, journalist
