= Kristo Rai Church =

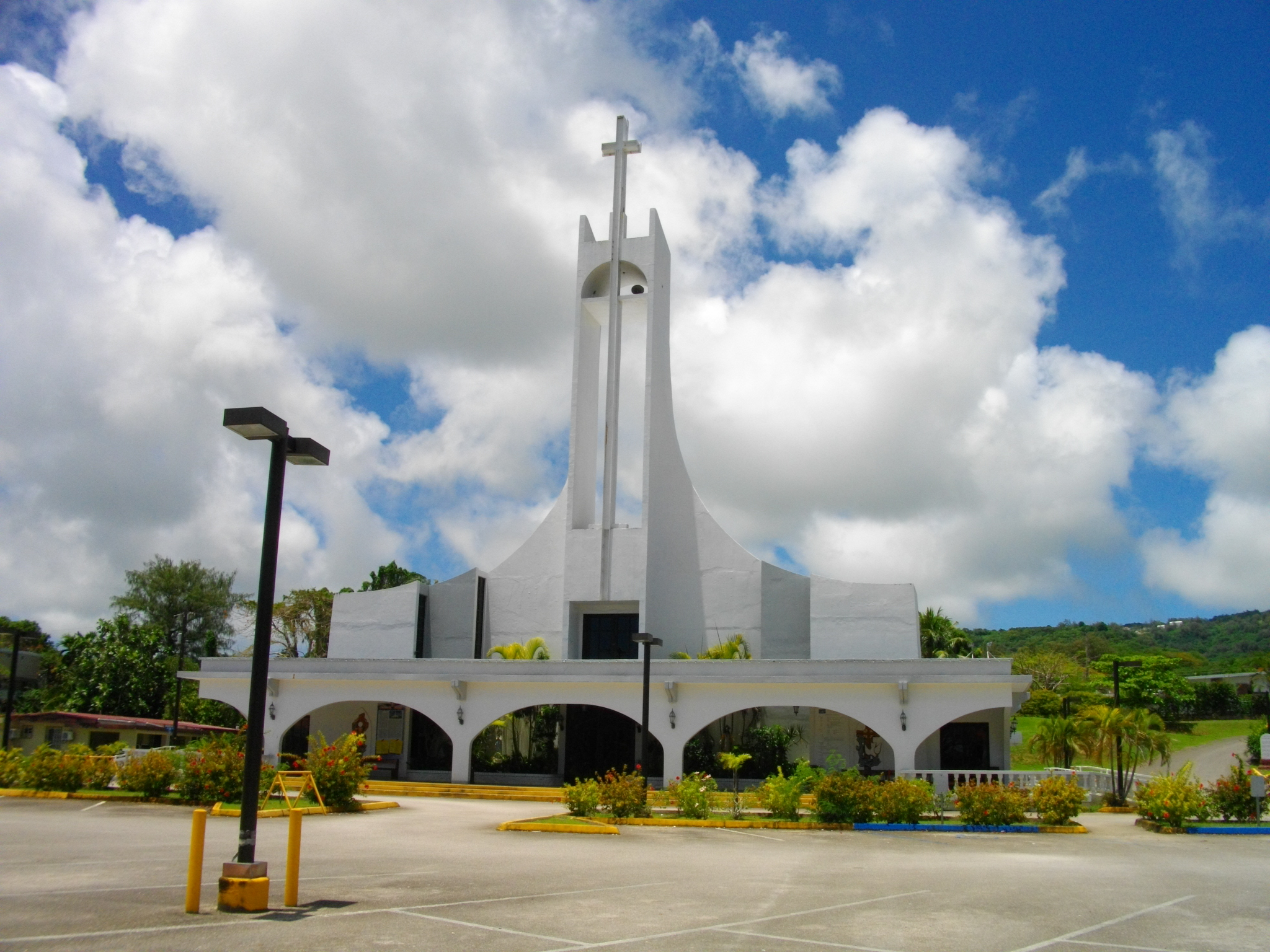
- Kristo Rai Church
- 15.202958°N 145.717724°E
- Location: Garapan
- Country: Northern Mariana Islands; USA
- Denomination: Roman Catholic Church

The Kristo Rai Church (or Christ the King Church, from Spanish Iglesia de Cristo Rey) is a Roman Catholic church in the street Kopa Di Oru of the town of Garapan in the Northern Marianas Islands, a dependent territory of the United States in the Pacific Ocean, part of Oceania.

The parish is under the jurisdiction of the Roman Catholic Diocese of Chalan Kanoa (Dioecesis Vialembensis). It was first built by the Spanish in 1876 but was terminated by the Germans in the twentieth century church. After World War II much of the city was destroyed and the original church had to be demolished. A new building was built between 1969 and 1970. The church dedicated to Christ the King was completed in 1978.

== History ==
According to the parish, Garapan had more than 20,000 residents before the Second World War, with the church at its centre. The concrete bell tower, built in 1932 by Spanish Jesuits brought in by the Japanese South Seas Mandate administration, is 10 metres tall and stood next to an older wood-frame church. It is the only part of the church to survive the bombardment of Garapan during the Battle of Saipan in June 1944, and it was listed on the National Register of Historic Places in 1984.

The foundation of the present building was laid in late 1976 under project director Jesus T. Lizama, with a fund drive led by Luis T. Camacho that included a raffle in 1977. It was dedicated on 26 November 1978 at an estimated cost of US$200,000. Built of steel beams reinforced with concrete, it is 120 feet long and 96 feet wide and seats about 600 people. A Chapel of the Blessed Sacrament, a baptismal font and a parish office have since been added.

== See also ==
- Roman Catholic Diocese of Chalan Kanoa
- Christ the King Church
