= Immaculate Heart of Mary Cathedral (Weno, Chuuk) =

Coordinates: 7.4573°N 151.8641°E

- Location: Weno, Chuuk
- Country: Federated States of Micronesia
- Denomination: Catholic Church

Administration
- Diocese: Diocese of Caroline Islands

Clergy
- Bishop: Most Rev. Julio Angkel

Immaculate Heart of Mary Cathedral is the Catholic cathedral church in Weno, in the Caroline Islands, and is the seat of the Diocese of Caroline Islands. The church is located in the village of Tannuk, in the municipality of Weno, Chuuk state capital, one of the Federated States of Micronesia.

The first church built in Tannuk dates back to 1915 and was built by German Jesuit missionaries. In 1946 a new wooden church, next to the headquarters of the mission of Chuuk was built. In the same year the nuns Mercedarias mission established in a school dedicated to St. Cecilia.

Later, the headquarters of the Jesuit mission was rebuilt in order to be expanded and added a wing to the church of Tannuk. The new and expanded mission church were solemnly dedicated to the Immaculate Heart of Mary in August 1951.

In the late sixties the new cathedral was dedicated. In 1973, Bishop Joseph Martin Neylon Tannuk moved his episcopal residence.
