= Guadalupe Sabio =

Spanish biochemist (born 1977)

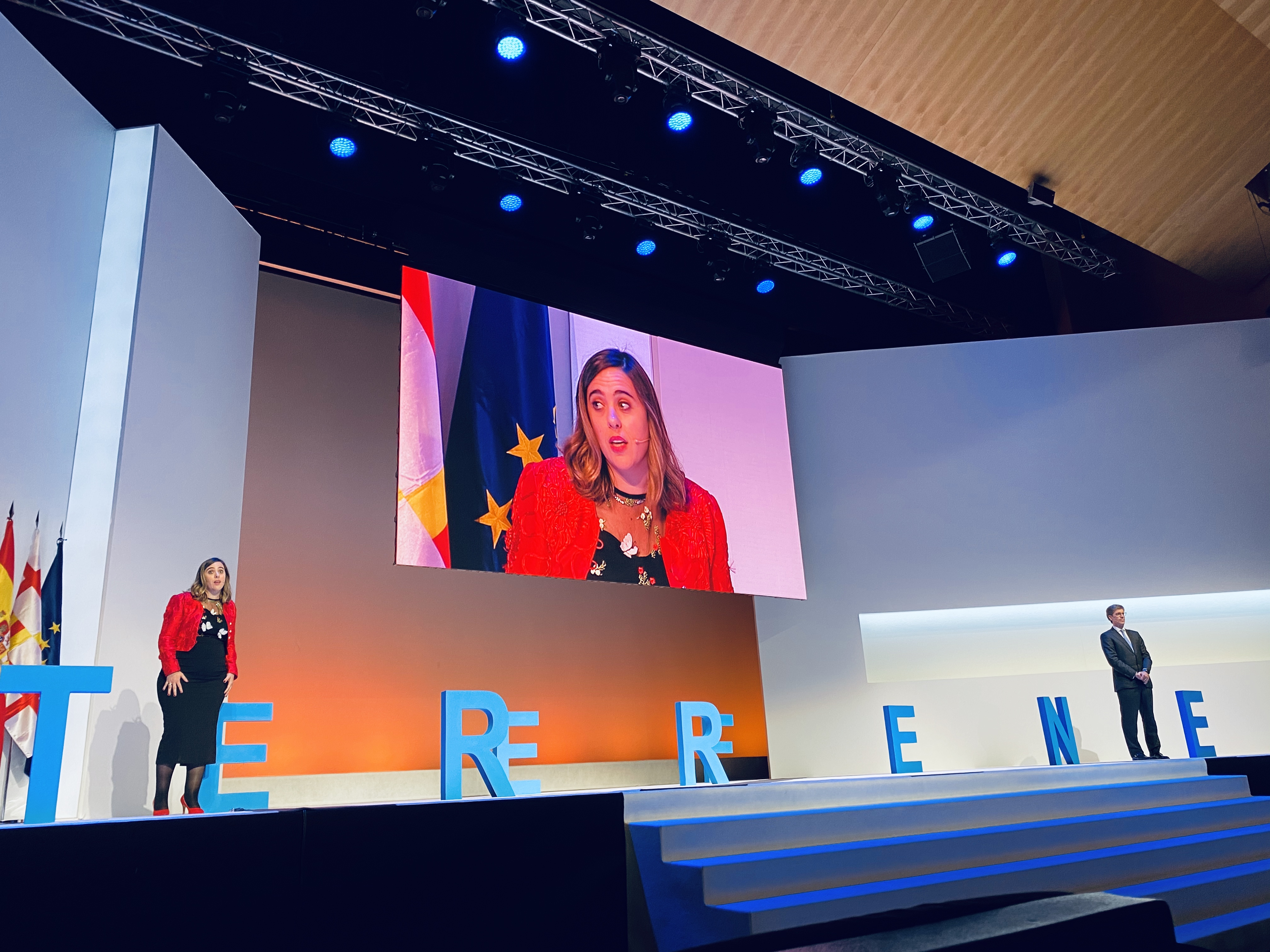
- Born: 4 June 1977 (age 49); Badajoz
- Education: University of Extremadura; University of Dundee
- Scientific career
- Workplaces: Spanish National Cardiovascular Research Centre; Howard Hughes Medical Institute
- Website: Sabio Lab

Guadalupe Sabio Buzo (born 4 June 1977) is a Spanish scientist and Professor at the Spanish National Cardiovascular Research Centre, which is part of the Carlos III Health Institute. Her research focuses on stress-activated kinases and the development of diseases associated with obesity. She was awarded the Princess of Girona Foundation Scientist Prize in 2012 and selected as one of the Top 100 Women Leaders in Spain in 2017.

== Early life and education ==
Sabio was born in Badajoz in 1977. She attended the Colegio del Santo Ángel and the Institute of San Fernando. She studied veterinary sciences at the University of Extremadura, and graduated in 2000 with an extraordinary award. She has said that she chose to study veterinary science as she liked animals very much, and that this could help her understand the origins of diseases. She moved to the United Kingdom for her doctoral studies, where she joined the University of Dundee as a Medical Research Council European graduate student. She completed her doctorate on p38 delta kinases in 2005. Whilst her PhD had taught her how to research in vitro, Sabio was keen to translate her research into mouse models. She joined the research group of Roger Davis at the Howard Hughes Medical Institute where she studied the impact of stress on kinases proteins. In 2009 she was awarded Santiago Ramón y Cajal funding to join a biotechnology laboratory in Spain.

== Research and career ==
Sabio joined the Spanish National Cardiovascular Research Centre in 2011. Sabio is investigating the molecular mechanisms that are associated with obesity, and how they can predispose patients to other conditions such as hepatocellular carcinoma. Hepatocellular carcinoma is a type of liver carcinoma, and the second most common cause of cancer-related deaths. Whilst there is chemotherapy available, it can only increase a patient's life by three months. Sabio researches p38gamma, a kinase protein that is expressed excessively in patients with hepatocellular carcinoma, and whether inhibition of this protein could reduce the cancer. She is developing drugs that inhibit p38gamma for the treatment of liver cancer. She has also investigated the C-Jun N-terminal kinases (JNK) protein, which is known to control obesity.

She believes that obesity will be a major challenge for future generations, and it should be taken as seriously as smoking. By considering fat, adipose tissue, as an endocrine organ she believes people will think more carefully about how to care for it. She believes that the best antidotes to obesity are exercise and diet. In 2017 Sabio was inducted into the European Molecular Biology Organization.

Sabio has been involved in several initiatives to promote women in science. She has called for more research into the symptoms of disease experienced by women.

== Selected publications ==
- Sabio, Guadalupe (2008-12-05). "A stress signalling pathway in adipose tissue regulates hepatic insulin resistance". Science. 322 (5907): 1539–1543. Bibcode:2008Sci...322.1539S. doi:10.1126/science.1160794. PMC 2643026. PMID 19056984.
- Sabio, Guadalupe (2008-05-02). "Phosphorylation by p38 MAPK as an Alternative Pathway for GSK3β Inactivation". Science. 320 (5876): 667–670. Bibcode:2008Sci...320..667T. doi:10.1126/science.1156037. PMC 2597039. PMID 18451303.
- Sabio, Guadalupe (2014-06-01). "TNF and MAP kinase signalling pathways". Seminars in Immunology. 26 (3): 237–245. doi:10.1016/j.smim.2014.02.009. PMC 4099309. PMID 24647229.
- Sabio, Guadalupe (2019-05-02). "p38γ is essential for cell cycle progression and liver tumorigenesis". Nature. 568 (7753): 557–560. Bibcode:2019Natur.568..557T. doi:10.1038/s41586-019-1112-8. hdl:20.500.12105/11565. PMID 30971822. S2CID 106411585.

== Awards and honours ==
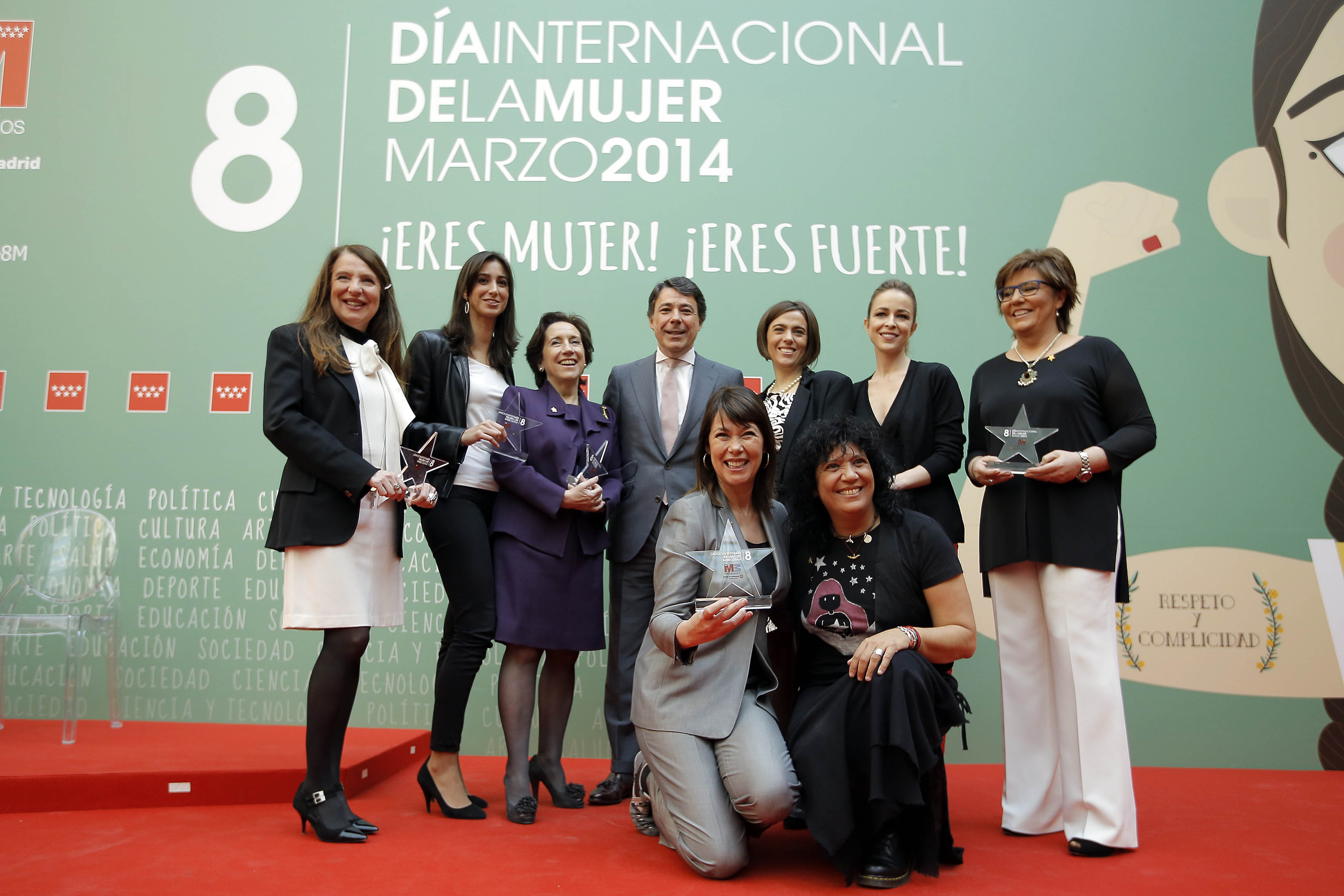
Guadalupe Sabio winning three Star of Madrid award

- 2020 European Society for Clinical Investigation Young Investigator Award Basic Research.
- 2009 L'Oréal-UNESCO For Women in Science Award
- 2012 Princess of Girona Foundation Scientist Prize
- 2014 Star of the Community of Madrid
- 2014, 2015, 2017 Top 100 Women Leaders
- 2017 European Molecular Biology Organization Leonardo de Biomedicina Fellow
- 2018 AstraZeneca Young Researcher Award
- 2019 Woman to Watch, Science Category
