= Andreas Laun =

Austrian Roman Catholic prelate (1942–2024)

His Excellency Andreas Laun
- Auxiliary Bishop Emeritus of Salzburg
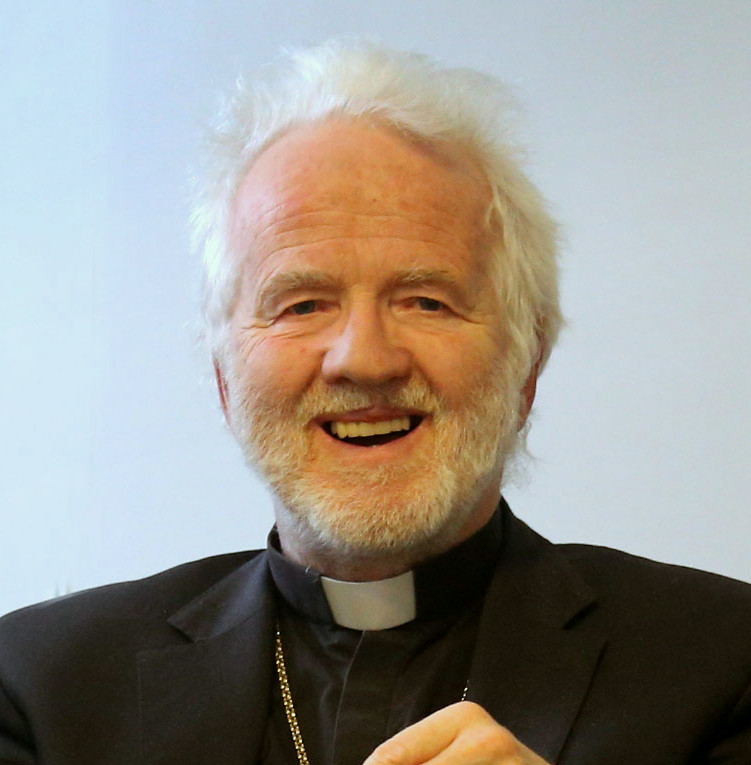
- Archdiocese: Salzburg
- Appointed: 25 January 1995
- Term ended: 13 October 2017
- Other post: Titular Bishop of Libertina (1995–2024)

Orders
- Ordination: 29 June 1967
- Consecration: 25 March 1995 by Georg Eder

Personal details
- Born: 13 October 1942 Vienna, Nazi Germany
- Died: 31 December 2024 (aged 82) Oberalm, Salzburg, Austria

Andreas Laun (13 October 1942 – 31 December 2024) was an Austrian Roman Catholic prelate. He was auxiliary Bishop of Salzburg from 1995 to 2017 and titular bishop of Libertina from 1995 until his death on 31 December 2024, at the age of 82.

Catholic Church titles
Preceded by —	Auxiliary Bishop of Salzburg; 1995–2017	Succeeded by —
Preceded by Amando Samo	Titular Bishop of Libertina; 1995–2024	Succeeded by Vacant
