= The Emory Wheel =

Student newspaper at Emory University

- Type: Student newspaper
- Format: Broadsheet
- Owner(s): Independently financed and operated
- Editor-in-chief: Jack Rutherford and Lauren Yee
- Founded: 1919
- Headquarters: Atlanta, Georgia
- Website: emorywheel.com

The Emory Wheel is the independent, student-run newspaper at Emory University in Atlanta, Georgia. The Wheel is published every other week on Wednesday during the regular school year, and is updated daily on its website. The sections of the Wheel include News, Opinion, Sports, Arts & Life and Multimedia. The paper also produces The Hub, a yearly magazine founded in 2005. Serving the Emory community since 1919, the Wheel is editorially and financially independent from the University. The staff is composed entirely of students. The Wheel won the Society of Professional Journalists Corbin Gwaltney Award for Best All-Around Student Newspaper in the “small” university division in 2025. The Wheel offices are currently located in Emory's Alumni Memorial University Center.

== History ==
=== Origins ===
The Emory Wheel began in 1919 as a weekly newspaper with its offices located in the journalism department. The name is wordplay on an emery wheel, a sharpening device. An editorial published in the first issue of The Wheel explains that the newspaper will strive to sharpen the intellect of the University community.

The newspaper, initially chartered by the Student Government Association, was originally meant to promote Emory's varsity level athletics and successfully lobbied to create an Emory track team.

=== Controversies ===
In the spring of 1970, a schism developed on the staff of the Wheel over the disputed election of Steve Johnson as editor. At that time the Wheel was being published twice a week. A competing newspaper was created, The Emory New Times. Both student newspapers were then published once weekly. J. Randolph Bugg, the losing candidate in the election for Wheel Editor, became the first editor of the New Times. After several years (and the graduation of all the aggrieved parties), the newspapers merged. For a while the publication was known as The Emory Wheel and New Times In 1975, during the editorship of Brenda Mooney, the "New Times" was dropped and the publication returned to its original name, "The Emory Wheel." .

In October 2005, Wheel General Manager Eileen Smith of seven years resigned amid controversy and animosity between the Wheel staff members and the University's Division of Campus Life. The Wheel Editorial Board maintained that Smith was pressured to resign by disapproving Campus Life administrators — a violation of the newspaper's independence from the University. Campus Life declined to comment. Smith signed an agreement not to discuss her resignation.

=== Modernization ===
In the spring of 2015, facing a changing media landscape, the Editorial Board moved to completely overhaul the paper's internal structures, design and content schedule. The paper changed to become a weekly print publication with a focus on producing daily online content. The Wheel itself changed from a broadsheet design to tabloid-sized news magazine. In addition to new branding and a revamped social media presence, the paper launched a new website. The board also formed new video and digital teams to assist the Wheel in its transition to a modern-day media publication. In 2016, the Wheel changed back to a broadsheet design.

=== The editorial board ===
The Emory Wheel redefined the structure of its editorial board in a constitutional amendment in the spring of 2016. Under the amendment, the new editorial board will consist of the editor-in-chief and members of the Emory community who will debate and develop the paper's official stance on local and national issues. The new editorial structure allowed the Wheel to divide its news coverage and opinion writing. The change was proposed after the paper's coverage of the 2016 on-campus pro-Trump chalkings, during which the editor-in-chief "cut out all those who had touched the story" from participating in editorial discussions to maintain credibility and neutrality.

== Circulation and distribution ==
The Emory Wheel prints 1,000 copies of the paper that are distributed throughout the main campus, its Oxford Campus and surrounding areas. The newspaper's website, emorywheel.com, has all content available for free, electronic versions of the paper copies.

== Notable former staff members ==
- Christopher McCandless, American hiker, subject of Into the Wild
- Carl Hiaasen, journalist, columnist and author
- Mike Sager, bestselling author and award-winning journalist
- Brenda L. Mooney, first female city editor of the Atlanta Journal-Constitution
- Chris Megerian, politics and statehouse reporter, Los Angeles Times
- Henry Schuster, producer, 60 Minutes
- Leisha Chi, reporter, BBC World News
- Mitchell Tanzman, founding partner, co-chief executive officer and co-chief investment officer, Central Park Group; Emory trustee, Investment Committee chair
- Reid Epstein, political reporter, New York Times
- Andrew Ackerman, reporter, Washington Post
- Robbie Brown, chief of staff to Bloomberg Media CEO and former consultant, The Boston Consulting Group
- Michelle Ye Hee Lee, Tokyo Bureau Chief, Washington Post
- Sam Borden, global sports correspondent, ESPN; formerly New York Times sports correspondent
- Ben Shpigel, sports reporter, New York Times
- Lindsay Jones, reporter, USA Today Sports
- Ben Volin, national NFL reporter, The Boston Globe
- Frank Main, reporter, Pulitzer Prize winner
- Elizabeth Prelogar, former Solicitor General of the United States

== Editors-in-chief ==
- Jack Rutherford and Lauren Yee (2026-2027)
- Spencer Friedland and Ellie Fivas (2025-2026)
- Madi Olivier and Sophia Peyser (2024-2025)
- Sarah Davis and Matthew Chupack (2023-2024)
- Julia Munslow (2017-2018)
- Zak Hudak (2016-2017)
- Dustin Slade (2015-2016)
- Priyanka Krishnamurthy (2014-2015)
- Arianna Skibell (2013-2014)
- Evan Mah (2012-2013)
- Molly Davis (2011-2012)
- Asher Smith (2010-2011)
- Michelle Ye Hee Lee (2009-2010)
- Salvador Rizzo (2008-2009)
- Chris Megerian (2007-2008)
- Robbie Brown (2006-2007)
- Geoff Pallay (2005-2006)
- Rob Miller (2004-2005)
- Andrew Ackerman (2003-2004)
- Christopher Wang (2002-2003)
- Barney Gimbel (2001-2002)
- Reid Epstein (2000-2001)
- Kathleen P. Chapman (1998-1999)
- Kimberly Freeman (1997-1998)
- Brian Reid (1996- 1997)
- Marcy Lamm (1995-1996)
- Dan Sadowsky (1994-1995)
- David A. Simanoff (1993-1994)
- Adam Biegel (1992-1993)
- Suzanne Morrissey (1991-1992)
- David Marmins (1990-1991)
- Robert J. Binney (1988-1989)
- Brenda L. Mooney (1975–76)
- William Ernest Rogers (1919), founder
