= Joaquín Felipe Oláiz y Zabalza =

Spanish clergyman and auxiliary bishop

Joaquín Felipe Oláiz y Zabalza (born 6 June 1872 in Pamplona) was a Spanish clergyman and auxiliary bishop for the Roman Catholic Archdiocese of Agaña. He became ordained in 1896. He was appointed bishop (or apostolic vicar) in 1914. He died in 1945.
