= Father Dueñas Memorial School =

Location
- 119 Dueñas Lane, Chalan Pago GU 96910; Chalan Pago, Guam 96910; 13.4378907°N 144.78766369999994°E

Information
- Type: Private, All-Boys
- Motto: Fortes in Fide (Strong in the Faith)
- Religious affiliation: Roman Catholic
- Established: 1948
- School district: Central
- Principal: Mr. Ismael Perez
- Staff: 1
- Faculty: 33
- Grades: 9–12
- Enrollment: 400+ (SY 2026-2027)
- Colors: Maroon & Gold
- Athletics conference: Independent Interscholastic Athletic Association of Guam (IIAAG)
- Mascot: Friars
- Accreditation: Western Association of Schools and Colleges Western Catholic Educational Association
- Website: http://www.fatherduenas.com/

Father Dueñas Memorial School (FDMS) is an all-male Catholic high school located in Chalan-Pago census-designated place, in the United States territory of Guam.

It is within the territory of the Roman Catholic Archdiocese of Agaña. The school is accredited by the Western Association of Schools and Colleges.

Most Rev. Apollinaris W. Baumgartner, OFM Cap. founded the school in 1948. It was named after Father Jesus Baza Dueñas, a Chamorro priest who was beheaded by Japanese forces during World War II. The school began as a seminary to teach young men to become priests; it became a university preparatory school.

== History ==
On October 1, 1948, Bishop Apollinaris Wiliam Baumgartner, O.F.M. Cap. established Father Dueñas Memorial School (FDMS) as a minor seminary and a high school for young men, near the site of Fr. Dueñas’ martyrdom. The Stigmatine Fathers were the first administrators of FDMS and the school graduated its first batch of 12 young men in 1950. The first buildings were simple Quonset huts that were gradually replaced by concrete structures with the help of FD families and community volunteers.

Subsequently, FDMS was administered by the Capuchin Franciscan Friars (1959-1974), the Marist Brothers (1974-1989), the Canons Regular (1989-1991), Mr. Jack Stettenbenz (1991), Mr. William Roth (1991-2009), the Salesians of Don Bosco (2009-2012), Fr. Jeffrey C. San Nicolas (2012-2016), Mr. Tony Thompson (2016-2018), and currently Mr. Ismael Perez served as principal.

=== List of Principals ===
- Fr. Fulgence Petrie, O.F.M. Cap. (1959–1974)
- Br. Gregory Seubert, F.M.S. (1974–1986)
- Brother Pius (1987)
- Fr. Efron (1989)
- Fr. Jim Greer (1990)
- Mr. Jack Stettenbenz+ (1991)
- Mr. William Roth (1991–2009)
- Fr. Vitaliano "Chito" Dimaranan, S.D.B. (2009–2012)
- Fr. Jeffrey C. San Nicolas FD'84 (2012–2016)
- Mr. Tony Thompson+ (2016-2018)
- Mr. Ismael Perez (2018–Present)

== Student life ==
=== Academics ===
As a college preparatory school, students are required to take four years of English, mathematics, science, social studies, and theology.

Students at Father Dueñas Memorial School compete in numerous academic competitions each year. Academic competitions include the American Mathematics Competition, Academic Challenge Bowl, Mock Trial, and the National Forensic League.

Many alumni of Father Dueñas Memorial School have attend prestigious colleges and universities, such as Columbia University, Stanford University, the United States Naval Academy, and Cornell University.

=== Athletics ===
Father Dueñas Memorial School is the only private school on the island to offer all of the Independent Interscholastic Athletic Association of Guam (IIAAG) sports for boys. These sports include football, golf, basketball, paddling, cross country, soccer, rugby, volleyball, track and field, wrestling, baseball, and tennis.

=== Arts ===
Father Dueñas Memorial School encourages student participation in areas outside of academics and athletics. Every year since 1981, the schools hosts its annual songfest competition. Starting as a simple song competition among each class currently in attendance, it has evolved over the years to include multiple performances by each class, with choreography and visual effects.

In addition to songfest, the students participate in an annual Christmas concert and are allowed to audition and participate in the school production.

=== Navy Junior Reserve Officers Training Corps ===
The Father Dueñas Memorial School Navy Junior Reserve Officers Training Corps Phoenix Company was started by Commander Charles E. White in 1973, as one of the first JROTC programs on the island and the only NJROTC program at the time. It is currently the only NJROTC program offered at a private school on the island. With approximately 20-25% of the school's population enrolled in the program at any given time, the program has the highest percentage of students in the NJROTC program out of Guam's schools that have NJROTC program established. The program is known for sending graduates to the United States Service academies or the Reserve Officers' Training Corps program each year. Notable graduates of the program include Governor Felix Camacho ('76) and Rear Admiral Peter Gumataotao ('76).

== Notable alumni ==
- Rudy Sablan, valedictorian '50, politician and Lieutenant Governor of Guam (1975–1979)
- Vicente C. Pangelinan, '74, senator
- James Espaldon, '75, senator
- Felix Camacho, '76, Governor of Guam
- Peter Gumataotao, '76, US Navy Admiral
- Manny Crisostomo, '76, Pulitzer Prize winner
- Eddie Baza Calvo, '79, Governor of Guam
- Frank B. Aguon Jr., '84, senator
