= Libertina =

Africa Proconsularis

Libertina was a town of the Roman province of Byzacena in North Africa during the Roman Empire. The town is tentatively identified with ruins near Souc-El-Arba, Tunisia.

The town was also the seat of a Christian bishopric, which survives as an ancient suppressed and titular see of the Roman Catholic Church in North Africa. During the 5th century the Catholic Bishop Victor and his Donatist rival, bishop Januarius, exchanged heated words at the Council of Carthage in 411. There appears to have been sectarian violence in Libertina during the lead up to the council.

The current bishop Andreas Laun of Salzburg, Austria. resigned in October 2017.
