= Our Lady of Mount Carmel Cathedral (Northern Mariana Islands) =

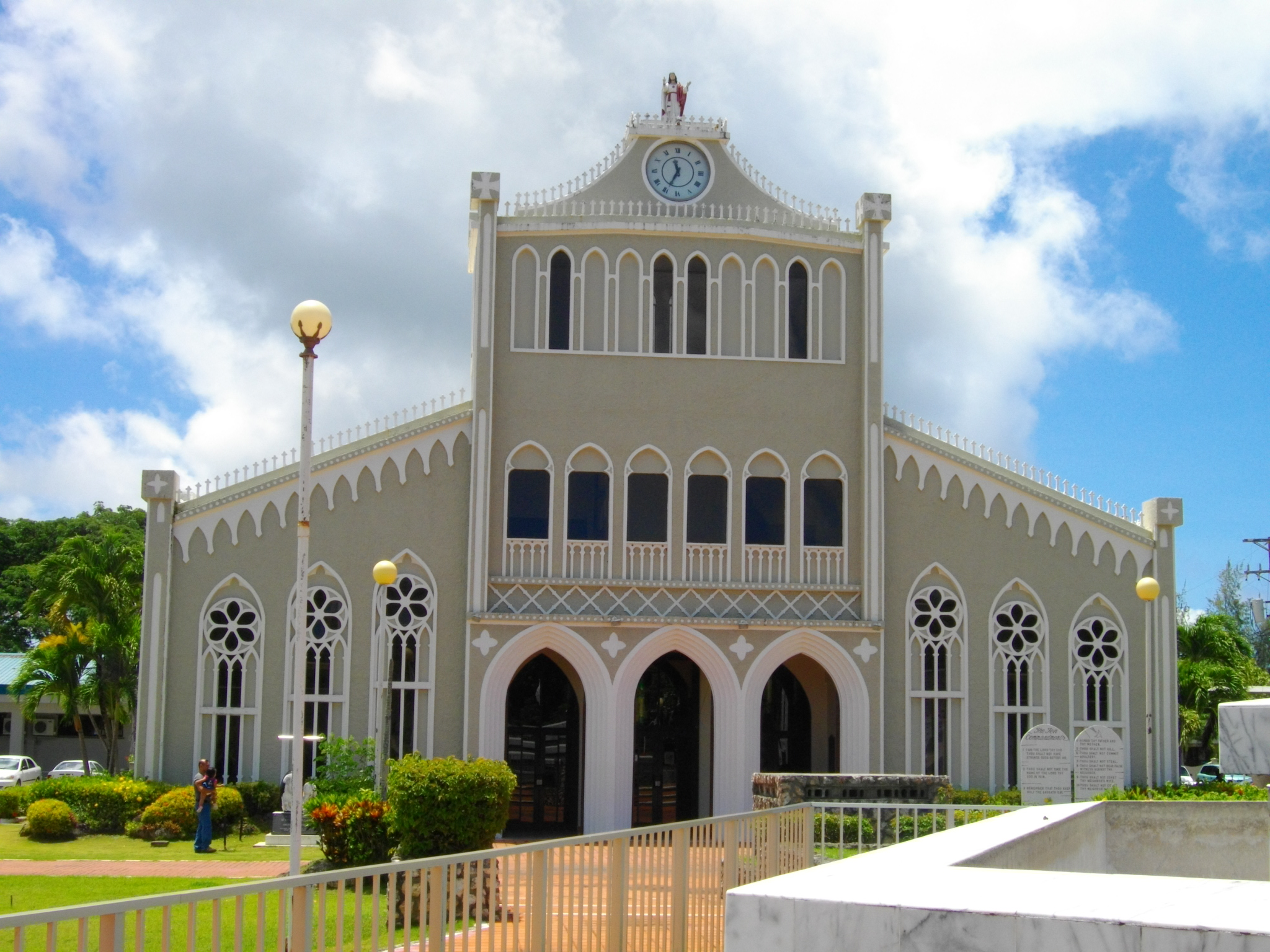
- Our Lady of Mount Carmel Cathedral, Saipan
- Our Lady of Mount Carmel Cathedral
- 15°9′4″N 145°42′7″E
- Location: Chalan Kanoa, Northern Mariana Islands, United States
- Denomination: Roman Catholic

History
- Status: Cathedral
- Dedication: Our Lady of Mount Carmel

Administration
- Diocese: Chalan Kanoa

Clergy
- Bishop: Most Rev. Romeo Duetao Convocar

The Our Lady of Mount Carmel Cathedral is a cathedral of the Roman Catholic Church in the Northern Mariana Islands, a territory of the United States. It is the mother church and seat of the bishop of the Diocese of Chalan Kanoa. The church is located in the village of Chalan Kanoa on the island of Saipan.

== See also ==
- List of Catholic cathedrals in the United States
- List of cathedrals in the United States
