= Manny Crisostomo =

Photojournalist from Guam

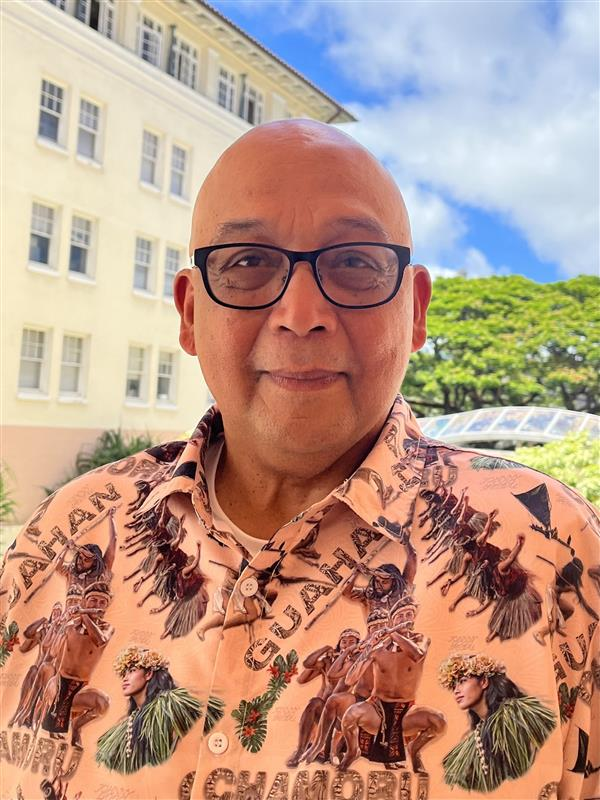
- Manny Crisostomo in 2024
- Education: University of Guam, University of Missouri
- Notable work: 'A Class Act, the Life and Times of Southwest High School'
- Awards: Pulitzer Prize for Feature Photography

Manny Crisostomo is a photojournalist and Pulitzer Prize winner from Guam.

== Biography ==
He was born in Sinajana, Guam, and attended Father Duenas Memorial School. He studied at the University of Guam and later — at the University of Missouri. During his school years, he interned at the Pacific Daily News and worked for the Newson as a reporter. However, he was rejected from a full-time position at the PDN by the chief editor and offered a position of a technician in a photo laboratory. Due to this assignment, he grew interested in photography and soon became a photojournalist. As a staff member, he worked for the Columbia Missourian, then joined the Jackson Citizen-Patriot and the Detroit Free-Press as a photographer. His publications also appeared in Life, Time, Newsweek, LA Times, etc.

In 1986 Crisostomo co-authored the book "Main Street: A portrait of Small-Town Michigan". In 1987 he edited "Moving Pictures: A Look at Detroit from High Atop the People Mover". By 1988, he won several important awards as a reporter.

In 1987–1988 at the Detroit Free Press he worked for 40 weeks on a series about student life at Southwestern High School. In a city full of violence, he tried to show ordinary kids and their life. The photographs were supported with a 12-page article "A Class Act, the Life and Times of Southwest High School". In 1989, the series was honoured with the Pulitzer Prize for feature photography. The money received for the award Crisostomo donated to the school.

In 1992 he published "Legacy of Guam: I Kustumbren Chamoru", dedicated to his motherland. As of 2020, Crisostomo works at The Sacramento Bee. In 2020 he published his fourth book "Echoes in the Dance".

In 2022, he had an exhibition "Pacific Gathering" at the East-West Center Gallery.

== Works ==
- "Main Street: A portrait of Small-Town Michigan". Detroit Free Press, 1986. ISBN 9780937247006
- "Moving Pictures: A Look at Detroit from High Atop the People Mover". Detroit Free Press, 1987. ISBN 9780937247020
- "Legacy of Guam: I Kustumbren Chamoru", Legacy Publications, 1992. ISBN 9780963127303
- "Echoes in the Dance" 2020.

== Literature ==
- Brennan, Elizabeth A.; Clarage, Elizabeth C. (1999). Who's who of Pulitzer Prize Winners. Phoenix: Oryx Press. p. 211. ISBN 1-57356-111-8.
- Fischer, Heinz-Dietrich (2011). Picture Coverage of the World: Pulitzer Prize Winning Photos. Transaction Publishers. p. 148. ISBN 978-3-643-10844-9.
