= Michael J. Byrnes =

American Roman Catholic bishop (1958–2025)

His Excellency, The Most Reverend Michael Jude Byrnes
- Archbishop Emeritus of Agaña
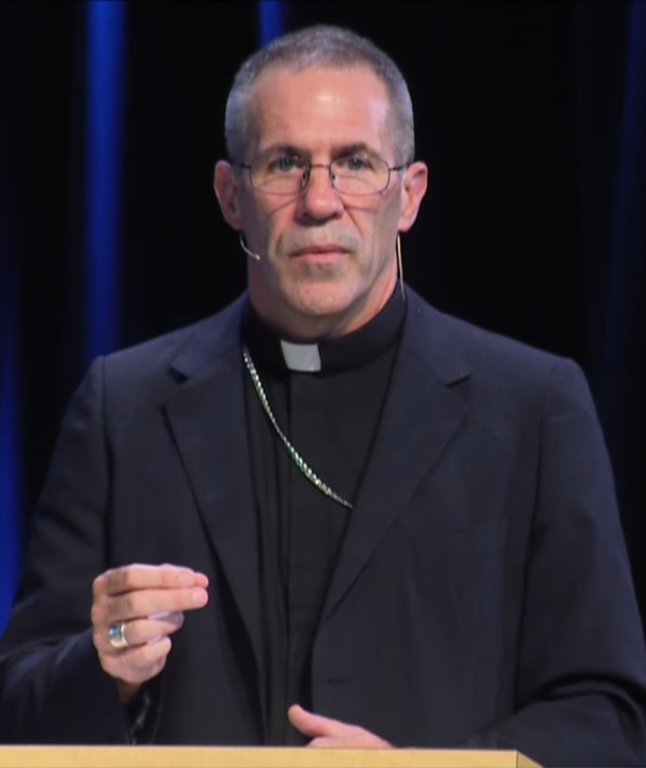
- Archbishop Byrnes in 2016
- Archdiocese: Agaña
- Appointed: October 31, 2016
- Installed: April 4, 2019
- Retired: March 28, 2023
- Predecessor: Anthony Sablan Apuron
- Successor: Ryan Jimenez
- Previous posts: Auxiliary Bishop of Detroit and Titular Bishop of Eguga (2011–2016); Coadjutor archbishop of Agaña (2016–2019)

Orders
- Ordination: May 25, 1996 by Adam Maida
- Consecration: May 5, 2011 by Allen Henry Vigneron, John Clayton Nienstedt, and John M. Quinn

Personal details
- Born: August 23, 1958 Detroit, Michigan, U.S.
- Died: May 30, 2025 (aged 66) Detroit, Michigan, U.S.
- Motto: Caritas Christi urget nos "The love of Christ compels us"

Styles of Michael Jude Byrnes
- Reference style: His Excellency; The Most Reverend
- Spoken style: Your Excellency
- Religious style: Archbishop

Michael Jude Byrnes (August 23, 1958 – May 30, 2025) was an American prelate of the Catholic Church who served as Archbishop of Agaña from 2019 to 2023. He was an auxiliary bishop in the Archdiocese of Detroit from 2011 to 2016.

== Biography ==
=== Early life ===
Born in Detroit, Michigan, on August 23, 1958, Michael Ryan graduated from Detroit Catholic Central High School.

After graduation from University of Michigan in Ann Arbor, he got involved with a charismatic community on campus and began working full time in campus ministry for University Christian Outreach at Eastern Michigan University in Ypsilanti and became a member of a lay religious brotherhood, the Servants of the Word.

Byrnes was ordained to the priesthood by Cardinal Adam Maida at the Cathedral of the Most Blessed Sacrament in Detroit on May 25, 1996, for the Archdiocese of Detroit. Beginning in 2004, he served as vice rector of Sacred Heart Major Seminary in Detroit as well as a parish pastor.

=== Auxiliary Bishop of Detroit ===
Coat of Arms as Auxiliary Bishop of Detroit

On March 22, 2011, Byrnes was appointed titular bishop of Eguga and auxiliary bishop of the Archdiocese of Detroit. He was consecrated by Archbishop Allen Henry Vigneron at the Cathedral of the Most Blessed Sacrament on May 5, 2011. His co-consecrators were Archbishop John Nienstedt and Bishop John Quinn.

=== Coadjutor Archbishop and Archbishop of Agaña ===
On October 31, 2016, Byrnes was appointed by Pope Francis as coadjutor archbishop with special faculties of the Archdiocese of Agaña. He was installed as coadjutor archbishop on November 30.

Although Archbishop Anthony Apuron of Agaña was found guilty on charges of the sexual abuse of minors by an Apostolic Tribunal of the Congregation for the Doctrine of the Faith on March 16, 2018, he was only suspended from the exercise of his authority over the archdiocese and retained his title pending the outcome of his appeals. Byrnes succeeded to the position of archbishop in everything except title at that time.

Byrnes became archbishop of Agaña on April 4, 2019, when Apuron lost his title, having exhausted his appeals. On April 6, the Holy See Press Office confirmed that Byrnes had succeeded to the office of archbishop at the conclusion of judicial proceedings against Apuron.

=== Retirement ===
On March 28, 2023, Pope Francis accepted Byrnes' resignation as archbishop of Agaña after he was diagnosed with Alzheimer's disease. Byrnes had left Guam in June 2022 and been on medical leave for several months.

=== Death ===
Byrnes died from complications of Alzheimer's disease under hospice care in Detroit, on May 30, 2025. He was 66.

Religious titles
Preceded by —	Auxiliary Bishop of Detroit; May 5, 2011 – October 31, 2016	Succeeded by —
Preceded by —	Coadjutor archbishop of Agaña; November 30, 2016 – April 4, 2019	Succeeded by —
Preceded by Anthony Sablan Apuron	Archbishop of Agaña; April 4, 2019 – March 28, 2023	Succeeded by Ryan Jimenez
