= Romeo Duetao Convocar =

His Excellency, The Most Reverend Romeo Duetao Convocar
- Bishop of Chalan Kanoa
- Diocese: Chalan Kanoa
- Appointed: November 25, 2024
- Installed: March 8, 2025
- Predecessor: Ryan Pagente Jimenez

Orders
- Ordination: September 17, 1996
- Consecration: March 8, 2025 by Gábor Pintér, Jose Advincula, and Ryan Pagente Jimenez

Personal details
- Born: April 13, 1970 (age 56) Janiuay, Iloilo, Philippines
- Motto: Quia Non Defecerunt Miserationes Eius
- Coat of arms

Styles of Romeo Duetao Convocar
- Reference style: His Excellency; The Most Reverend
- Spoken style: Your Excellency
- Religious style: Bishop

Romeo Duetao Convocar (born April 13, 1970) is a Filipino priest of the Catholic Church who serves as bishop for the Diocese of Chalan Kanoa.

== Biography ==
Convocar was born in Iloilo, Philippines on April 13, 1970. He completed both his high school studies and attended St. Joseph Seminary in Dumaguete City, receiving his bachelor of arts major in philosophy with a minor in English. He then attended St Joseph Regional Seminary in Jaro, Iloilo City where he completed his theological studies. On September 17, 1996, Convocar was ordained to the priesthood and commissioned as a Military Chaplain in the Armed Forces of the Philippines with the rank of captain where he served as a chaplain officer and was assigned to various military installations and commands under the headquarters units and the Navy.

=== Episcopal career ===
Pope Francis appointed Convocar bishop for the Diocese of Chalan Kanoa on November 25, 2024. Convocar was consecrated as a bishop on March 8, 2025.

== See also ==
- Catholic Church hierarchy
- Catholic Church in the United States
- Historical list of the Catholic bishops of the United States
- List of Catholic bishops of the United States
- Lists of patriarchs, archbishops, and bishops

== Episcopal succession ==
Catholic Church titles
Preceded by Ryan Pagente Jimenez	Bishop of Chalan Kanoa; 2025-Present	Succeeded by Incumbent

Category:20th-century Filipino Roman Catholic priests]]
