= St. Anthony College (Hudson, New Hampshire) =

Coordinates: 42.744446°N 71.427247°W

- Type: Catholic seminary college
- Active: circa 1954–circa 1978
- Affiliation: Order of Friars Minor Capuchin
- Location: Hudson, New Hampshire, United States

St. Anthony College was a bachelor's degree-granting seminary college in Hudson, New Hampshire, that provided a foundation for men preparing for service in the Capuchin order of friars. The college offered a program in philosophy leading to the B.A. degree.

The college was operated by the Capuchin Province of St. Mary, founded in 1952 and spanning New York and New England. It was located at St. Anthony Friary in Hudson, which was constructed in 1954. The friary and college closed in 1979.

== Notable alumni ==
- Anthony Sablan Apuron, friar; Archbishop of Agana in Guam from 1986 to 2018

== See also ==
- Order of Friars Minor Capuchin § Other jurisdictions for information on the Province of St. Mary
