= Apostolic Vicariate of Micronesia =

Former Roman Catholic jurisdiction in Micronesia

The Apostolic Vicariate (originally Apostolic Prefecture) of Micronesia was a 19th-century Roman Catholic missionary pre-diocesan jurisdiction in Micronesia (Oceania).

== History ==
The Apostolic Prefecture of Micronesia was established in 1844, on territory split off from the Apostolic Vicariate of Western Oceania.

On 15 May 1886, it lost territory to establish the Mission sui juris of Eastern Carolines and the Mission sui juris of Western Carolines.

In 1887 it was promoted to Apostolic Vicariate (entitled to a titular bishop) of Micronesia. It remained exempt, i.e. directly subject to the Holy see, not part of any ecclesiastical province.

On 10 May 1889, it was suppressed, its territory passing to the Apostolic Vicariate of New Britain (another offspring of the Apostolic Vicariate of Western Oceania, now the Archdiocese of Rabaul).
