= Anthony Sablan Apuron =

Former Catholic archbishop

His Excellency, The Most Reverend Anthony Sablan Apuron OFM Cap.
- Archbishop Emeritus of Agaña
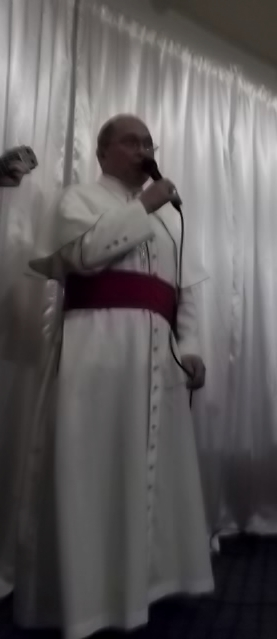
- Archdiocese: Agaña, Guam
- Appointed: March 10, 1986
- Installed: May 11, 1986
- Predecessor: Felixberto Camacho Flores
- Successor: Michael J. Byrnes
- Previous post: Auxiliary Bishop of Agaña, Guam and Titular Bishop of Muzuca in Byzacena (1983–1986)

Orders
- Ordination: August 26, 1972
- Consecration: February 19, 1984 by Felixberto Camacho Flores, Joseph Anthony Ferrario, and Peter Baptist Tadamaro Ishigami
- Laicized: February 7, 2019

Personal details
- Born: 1 November 1945 (age 80) Tamuning, Guam
- Denomination: Roman Catholic
- Motto: Servus tuus (Your servant)
- Coat of arms

Anthony Sablan Apuron, OFM Cap. (born November 1, 1945) is a Guamanian Catholic former prelate who served as Archbishop of Agaña from 1983 until 2016, when the Holy See removed him for child sexual abuse crimes. He is a member of the Order of Friars Minor Capuchin.

== Biography ==
=== Early life ===
Apuron was born on November 1, 1945, in Tamuning, Guam, the eighth of ten children of Manuel Taijito Apuron and Ana Santos Sablan. He joined the Capuchin order and was educated at St. Anthony College in Hudson, New Hampshire, and at the Capuchin Seminary in Garrison, New York.

Apuron studied at Maryknoll Seminary in Ossining New York, and at the University of Notre Dame in Notre Dame, Indiana.

Apuron was ordained a priest on August 26, 1972, at Dulce Nombre de Maria Cathedral Basilica in Hagåtña, Guam by Archbishop Felixberto Flores. On December 8, 1983, Pope John Paul II appointed Apuron as an auxiliary bishop of the Archdiocese of Agaña.

=== Same-sex marriage ===
In opposition to a bill legalizing same-sex marriage, Apuron wrote a letter in October 2009 complimenting Islamists who punish gay men with death and contrasting them with gay culture, which he described as self-absorbed. It said:

The culture of homosexuality is a culture of self-absorption because it does not value self-sacrifice. It is a glaring example of what John Paul II has called the culture of death. Islamic fundamentalists clearly understand the damage that homosexual behavior inflicts on a culture. That is why they repress such behavior by death. Their culture is anything but one of self-absorption. It may be brutal at times, but any culture that is able to produce wave after wave of suicide bombers (women as well as men) is a culture that at least knows how to value self-sacrifice.

In an April 2015 letter, Apuron wrote:

It is important to understand that the political pressure to push the agenda for same-sex “marriage” has never been about gay rights; the true intention behind this agenda has always been about the destruction of the family and the imposition of the totalitarian system.

=== Sexual abuse allegations ===
In 2010, in response to rumors of sexual abuse by clergy, the Archdiocese of Agana invited anyone with information about abuse to report it. It said that "We take the protection of children very seriously" and that the church was ready to provide assistance "as part of the church’s charity and embrace of those suffering and in need."

In November 2014, John C. Toves accused Apuron of molesting Toves' cousin in the early 1980s. In response, Apuron threatened Toves with a defamation lawsuit and refused to meet with him. Toves met instead with the archdiocese's "sexual abuse response coordinator" Larry Claros. Claros announced that there would be no investigation into the allegations because "the policy of the archdiocese on sexual abuse calls for the victim to make a complaint", not a third party.

In 2014, Deacon Stephen Martinez told Apuron that he was violating the church's policy on the investigation of sex abuse accusations. This involved allegations that predated those made in 2016. Martinez coordinated an archdiocesan group tasked with reviewing sexual abuse allegations. In response to Martinez's criticism, Apuron removed him from the group. When new accusations emerged in 2016, Martinez said that Apuron protected himself with the church's policies regarding sexual abuse. He also stated that Apuron's refusal to step down as archbishop while being scrutinized over sexual abuse allegations was a demonstration of "incompetence". In a press release, the archdiocese said that Martinez's statements were "calumny of such magnitude that the only avenue, which we are following, is recourse to the civil and canonical legal processes to address these intentional lies".

On May 17, 2016, Roy Quintanilla, a Hawaii resident and former altar boy at Our Lady of Mt. Carmel Parish in Agat, accused Apuron of molestation. Quintanilla said the abuse had occurred 40 years earlier when he was 12 years old. He claimed to have proof to back up his charges and had friends who had also allegedly been victims of Apuron. The Archdiocese responded by threatening to sue anyone who made such accusations and called them "malicious lies". Quintanilla could not file criminal charges against Apuron due to Guam's statute of limitations. The law prevented anyone who was sexually victimized before the age of 18 from taking legal action against the perpetrator after the victim turned 21. (Note: In 2011, Senator Benjamin Cruz in 2011 sponsored legislation to abolish the statute of limitations. Its enactment did not impact earlier crimes such as those alleged by Quintanilla.)

On May 28, 2016, Vincent Pereda, a member of the archdiocesan review board and an Apuron appointee, resigned in protest. He stated that

"the sexual abuse policy is a flawed policy because of the situation the board is in now... The policy pretty much has the archbishop making all the decisions and determinations when it comes to handling sexual misconduct cases within the archdiocese."

Pereda, a clinical social worker and licensed therapist for over 30 years, said he had spoken with Quintanilla, a close relative, and would be willing to vouch for his credibility in court.

On May 31, 2016, Doris Y. Concepcion, an Arizona resident, accused Apuron of sexually abusing her son, Joseph A. Quinata. She said that Quinata had served as altar boy in Guam at the same time as Quintanilla. Before Quinata's death in 2005, he told his mother that Apuron had molested him. After reading Quintanilla's accusations in the news, Concepcion decided to speak out. In response, the archdiocese gave notice of legal action against her and Quintanilla.

On June 5, 2016, Pope Francis placed Apuron on leave to deal with the sexual abuse allegations and appointed as apostolic administrator Archbishop Savio Hon to run the archdiocese. That same day, Apuron issued a decree declaring the Concerned Catholics of Guam (CCOG) as a "prohibited society" prohibiting Catholics from associating with its members. He accused them with disseminating "fraudulent or otherwise malicious allegations" against him. CCOG said its purpose was to give members of the laity a voice in the operation of the archdiocese.

On June 7, 2016, Walter G. Denton, another former altar boy from Agat, said that Apuron had sexually abused him in April 1977 when he was age 13. Denton told a radio interviewer that in 2015, he found out that Apuron had molested one of his cousins. Denton then sent a notarized letter describing his experiences to Archbishop Martin Krebs, apostolic delegate to the Pacific Islands, in August 2015. Krebs delivered the letter to the Holy See. A few months later, Bishop Thomas Olmsted assured Denton that the Holy See was investigating his charges. (Note: Olmsted was the Bishop of Phoenix, Arizona, where Denton was then living.) Denton heard nothing more from the Holy See before making his charges public in 2016. (Note: Denton also said he had reported the abuse to a priest, Rev. Jack Nilan, not long after it occurred, but no action resulted.) Denton's lawyer, David Lujan, stated that other alleged victims of Apuron had also been in touch with him.

=== Removal and conviction ===
In October 2016, the Congregation for the Doctrine of the Faith (CDF) in Rome assigned Cardinal Raymond Burke to preside over Apuron's trial on sex abuse charges in Guam. The other four judges were bishops. On October 31, 2016, Pope Francis replaced his apostolic administrator, Savio Hon Tai-Fai, with Archbishop Coadjutor Michael J. Byrnes. On March 16, 2018, Apuron was found guilty on charges of the sexual abuse of minors by the tribunal. Byrnes was given full authority over the archdiocese, but Apuron retained his title as archbishop pending the outcome of further appeals.

On February 7, 2019, the Apostolic Tribunal of the CDF denied Apuron's appeal. Following further review, on April 4, 2019, the CDF confirmed the verdict and declared it final, with no further possible appeal. It described Apuron as "guilty of delicts [transgressions] against the Sixth Commandment with minors". The imposed included Apuron's removal from office; a perpetual prohibition from dwelling, even temporarily, in the jurisdiction of the Archdiocese of Agaña; and a perpetual prohibition from his using the insignia attached to the rank of bishop. The Vatican does not have legal authority over the US Territory of Guam. Therefore, it is unable to legally enforce its ban on where Apuron lives, so long as he doesn't try to live on church-owned property. Apuron was also banned from returning to Catholic property in Guam.

In August 2019, at least two new sex abuse allegations surfaced against Apuron in lawsuits. Some other clergy who have served in the archdiocese were named as defendants in lawsuits against Apuron as well.

On April 4, 2019, Pope Francis appoints Byrnes as Archbishop of Agaña. Byrnes stated later that year that Apuron did not leave him any records of the sex abuse allegations, counter to Church law.

On March 23, 2021, US Federal District Judge Frances Tydingco-Gatewood denied Apuron's motion to temporarily halt proceedings in Guam's clergy sex abuse cases. In August 2021, court filings which were made public revealed that Apuron had testified in court to deny a former Father Duenas Memorial School student's allegations that Apuron raped and sexually abused him multiple times in the school year 1994–1995 at the then-archbishop's private residence in Agana Heights.

== Notes ==
Catholic Church titles
| Preceded by Felixberto Camacho Flores | Archbishop of Agana; May 11, 1986 – March 16, 2018 | Succeeded by Michael J. Byrnes |
