= Raymundo Taco Sabio =

Filipino Roman Catholic priest (1946–2022)

- Prefect Emeritus of Marshall Islands
- Archdiocese: Agaña
- Appointed: 21 December 2007
- Term ended: 28 June 2017
- Predecessor: James Charles Gould
- Successor: Ariel Galido

Orders
- Ordination: 28 December 1971 by Antonio Fortich

Personal details
- Born: 2 March 1946 Tubungan, Philippines
- Died: 22 March 2022 (aged 76) Quezon City, Philippines

Raymundo Taco Sabio (2 March 1946 – 16 September 2022) was a Filipino Roman Catholic priest.

Sabio was born in the Philippines and was ordained to the priesthood un 1971. He was a member of the Missionaries of the Sacred Heart since 1969. Sabio served as the prefect of the Apostolic Prefecture of the Marshall Islands from 2007 until his resignation in 2017.

Catholic Church titles
Preceded by James Charles Gould	Prefect of Marshall Islands; 2007–2017	Succeeded by Ariel Galido
