= Vincent Ignatius Kennally =

Vincent Ignatius Kennally S.J.
- Vicar Apostolic of Caroline and Marshall Islands
- Church: Catholic Church
- See: Apostolic Vicariate of Caroline and Marshall Islands
- In office: December 9, 1956 – September 20, 1971
- Predecessor: Thomas John Feeney
- Successor: Martin Joseph Neylon
- Other post: Titular Bishop of Sassura (1956-1977)
- Previous posts: Apostolic Administrator of Caroline and Marshall Islands (1946-1956)

Orders
- Ordination: June 20, 1928 by Joseph N. Dinand
- Consecration: March 35, 1957 by Francis Spellman

Personal details
- Born: June 11, 1898 Dorchester, Boston, Massachusetts, United States
- Died: April 12, 1977 (aged 78)

Vincent Ignatius Kennally (June 11, 1895 – April 12, 1977) was a Roman Catholic bishop.

Born in Dorchester, Massachusetts, Kennally was ordained a priest for the Society of Jesus on June 20, 1928. On June 4, 1946, he was appointed apostolic administrator of the Vicariate Apostolic of Caroline and Marshall Islands. On December 6, 1956, Kennally was appointed Vicar Apostolic of Caroline and Marshall Islands and titular bishop of Sassura and was ordained bishop on March 25, 1957. He retired on September 20, 1971.
