= Agustín José Bernaus y Serra =

Roman-catholic bishop

Agustín José Bernaus y Serra OFMCap
- Vicar Apostolic of Bluefields
- Church: Catholic Church
- See: Apostolic Vicariate of Bluefields
- In office: 14 September 1913 – 18 January 1930
- Predecessor: Vicariate established
- Successor: Maties Solà i Farell
- Other post: Titular Bishop of Milopotamos (1913-1930)
- Previous post: Vicar Apostolic of Guam (1913)

Orders
- Ordination: 6 April 1889
- Consecration: 8 September 1913 by Josep Torras i Bages

Personal details
- Born: 16 August 1863 Artesa de Segre, Catalonia, Kingdom of Spain
- Died: 18 January 1930 (aged 66)

Agustín José Bernaus y Serra (16 August 1863 in Artesa de Segre – 18 January 1930) was a Spanish clergyman and bishop for the Roman Catholic Diocese of Bluefields. He became ordained in 1889.

He was appointed Vicar Apostolic of Guam (now Agaña) and Titular Bishop of Milopotamos in May 1913, and Vicar Apostolic of Bluefields in Nicaragua in September 1913.

He died on 18 January 1930, at the age of 66.
