= Apostolic Prefecture of the Marshall Islands =

Latin Catholic missionary jurisdiction in the Pacific

Coordinates: 7.013°N 168.222°E

Apostolic Prefecture of the Marshall Islands Praefectura Apostolica Insularum Marshallensium

Location
- Country: (Marshall Islands)
- Ecclesiastical province: Agaña

Statistics
- Area: 69 sq mi (180 km^{2})
- Population: Total; Catholics: (as of 2021); 59,000; 5,123 (8.7%)
- Parishes: 5

Information
- Denomination: Catholic Church
- Sui iuris church: Latin Church
- Rite: Roman Rite
- Established: 23 April 1993 (33 years ago)
- Cathedral: Cathedral of the Assumption (Majuro)

Current leadership
- Pope: Leo XIV
- Apostolic Prefect: Fr. Tamati Alefosio Sefo, M.S.C.

Map
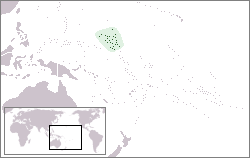

The Apostolic Prefecture of the Marshall Islands (Latin: Praefectura Apostolica Insularum Marshallensium) is a Latin Church ecclesiastical jurisdiction or apostolic prefecture of the Catholic Church in the Marshall Islands.

The apostolic prefecture is a suffragan in the ecclesiastical province of the metropolitan Archdiocese of Agaña (with its see on Guam), yet still depends on the Dicastery for Evangelization.

Although the see of the prefecture, the Cathedral of the Assumption, in Majuro, on Majuro Atoll, is not in the United States, the prelature includes Wake Island, which is an unorganized, unincorporated territory of the United States.

== Statistics ==
As of 2021, there were 5,123 Catholics (8.7% of the population) on 181 km^{2} of islands in a marine area nearly the size of the United States, served by 6 priests, 3 deacons and 6 nuns across 5 parishes.

== History ==
Missionaries from the Order of Missionaries of the Sacred Heart (M.S.C.) arrived in 1898. In 1905, a pre-diocesan jurisdiction was established as Mission sui juris of Marshall Islands, on territory split off from the then Apostolic Vicariate of New Pomerania (mainly New Britain, in the Bismarck Archipelago of Papua New Guinea).

On April 5, 1923, the independent mission was suppressed, its territory being merged into the then Apostolic Vicariate of Mariana, Caroline and Marshall Islands.

On April 23, 1993, Pope John Paul II split the former Diocese of Carolines-Marshalls into the Apostolic Prefecture of the Marshall Islands and the Diocese of Caroline Islands. In 2007, Father James Gould, apostolic prefect, resigned. Father Raymundo Sabio, a Filipino missionary, was chosen to succeed him.

== Ordinaries ==
Ecclesiastical Superior of the mission sui iuris Marshall Islands

- Father Bruno Schinxe, Missionaries of the Sacred Heart of Jesus (M.S.C.), (1905 - death 1915)

Apostolic Prefects of Marshall Islands

1. James Charles Gould, Jesuits (S.J.) (born USA) (23 April 1993 – resigned 21 December 2007), no other prelature
2. Raymundo Taco Sabio, Missionaries of the Sacred Heart of Jesus (M.S.C.) (born Philippines) (22 December 2007 – retired 28 June 2017), no previous prelature
3. Ariel Galido, M.S.C. (born Philippines) (28 June 2017 – resigned 14 January 2025), no previous prelature
4. Tamati Alefosio Sefo, M.S.C. (born Samoa) (14 January 2025 – ...), no previous prelature

== See also ==
- Religion in the Marshall Islands
- Catholic Church by country
- Global organisation of the Catholic Church
- List of Catholic dioceses (alphabetical) (including archdioceses)
- List of Catholic dioceses (structured view) (including archdioceses)
- List of Catholic dioceses in South Pacific Islands

== Sources and external links ==
- GCatholic, with Google map and - satellite photo - data for all sections
- Catholic Hierarchy Profile of the Apostolic Prefecture of the Marshall Islands
