= Diocese of Caroline Islands =

Catholic Diocese of Micronesia

Coordinates: 7°27′26″N 151°51′52″E

Diocese of Caroline Islands Diœcesis Carolinensium Diócesis de las Islas Carolinas
- The coat of arms of the Diocese of the Caroline Islands

Location
- Country: Micronesia; Palau
- Territory: Caroline Islands
- Ecclesiastical province: Agaña

Statistics
- Area: 480 sq mi (1,200 km^{2})
- Population: Total; Catholics: (as of 2023); 115,382; 63,437 (55%)
- Parishes: 30

Information
- Denomination: Christianity (Catholic)
- Sui iuris church: Latin Church
- Rite: Roman Rite
- Established: 19 December 1905 (120 years ago)
- Cathedral: Immaculate Heart of Mary Cathedral

Current leadership
- Pope: Leo XIV
- Bishop: Julio Angkel

Map
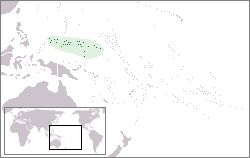

The Catholic Diocese of Caroline Islands (Latin: Diœcesis Carolinensium) is an ecclesiastical territory or diocese of the Catholic Church in the Federated States of Micronesia and in the Republic of Palau. It is a suffragan diocese of the Ecclesiastical Province of Agaña. The Diocese of Caroline Islands is led by a bishop who pastors the mother church, the Cathedral of the Immaculate Heart of Mary.

== History ==
The diocese was established on 19 December 1905, as the Apostolic Prefecture (missionary jurisdiction) of Caroline Islands, uniting the Mission sui iuris of Eastern Carolines and Mission sui iuris of Western Carolines, both of which had been split from the Apostolic Prefecture of Micronesia in 1886.

It became the Apostolic Vicariate (higher missionary stage jurisdiction, entitled to a titular bishop) of Marianne and Caroline Islands on 1 March 1911. It grew to become the Apostolic Vicariate of Marianne, Caroline and Marshall Islands on 4 May 1923. It changed its name to become the Apostolic Vicariate of Caroline and Marshall Islands on 4 July 1946.

It was elevated to become the diocese Carolines-Marshalls by promotion on 3 May 1979.

The diocese was split on 23 April 1993 by Pope John Paul II, resulting in the creation of the present-day Diocese of Caroline Islands and the Apostolic Prefecture of the Marshall Islands.

== Demographics ==
According to 2022 government statistics, 55% of residents were Catholic; 42% of the population were Protestant and 2% belonged to other Christian denominations.

== Bishops ==
=== Ordinaries ===
- Salvador-Pierre Walleser (1912 – 1919)
- Vacant (1920 – 1922)
- Santiago López de Rego y Labarta S.J. (1923 –b1938)
- Vacant (1939 – 1951)
- Thomas John Feeney S.J. (1951 - 1955)
- Vincent Ignatius Kennally S.J. (1956 – 1971)
- Martin Joseph Neylon S.J. (1971 – 1995)
  - coadjutor 1969 – 1971
- Amando Samo (1995 – 2020)
  - auxiliary 1987 – 1994
  - coadjutor 1994 – 1995
- Julio Angkel (2020 – present)
  - coadjutor 2017 – 2020

== See also ==
- Religion in the Federated States of Micronesia
