= Jesus Baza Duenas =

Guamanian Roman Catholic priest

Jesus Baza Dueñas
- Born: March 19, 1911; Hagåtña, Guam
- Died: July 12, 1944 (aged 33); Ta'i, Mangilao
- Cause of death: Beheading
- Resting place: St. Joseph's Church; Inarajan, Guam
- Occupation: Priest
- Parent(s): Luis Paulino Dueñas (father); Josefa Martínez Baza (mother)

Jesus Baza Dueñas (March 19, 1911 – July 12, 1944) was a Catholic priest and local leader on Guam during World War II. He was tortured and beheaded along with three others by Japanese forces for refusing to disclose the location of a U.S. service member hiding in Guam.

== Early life ==
Dueñas was born on March 19, 1911, to his parents of Luis Paulino Dueñas and Josefa Martínez Baza in Hagåtña, Guam, with siblings Pedro, Eduardo, and José among others.

== Education ==
Dueñas studied for the priesthood in Manila, and became the second Chamorro Catholic priest when he was ordained in 1938. During the World War II Japanese occupation of Guam, Japanese forces who suspected Dueñas of knowing the whereabouts of a fugitive American serviceman tortured and, on July 12, 1944, killed him.

== Japanese occupation ==
In December 1941, Japan invaded and occupied Guam. In early 1942, Father Dueñas was appointed temporary head of Guam's Catholic church. He sometimes told local people not to cooperate with the Japanese, and his independence and status on Guam worried them. The Japanese kept a close watch on Dueñas and wanted to exile him, but worried that relations with local people would worsen if they did so. Japan decided to send to Guam two more cooperative Catholic priests, Monsignor Dominic Fukahori and Father Petro Komatzu, but Duenas at personal risk often refused to co-operate with them.

Friends and associates operated secret radio receivers and kept Dueñas well informed on the progress of the war.

Father Dueñas knew much about the movements of the six American servicemen who had escaped capture during the December 10, 1941 Japanese ground invasion, and about those who helped and harbored them. He is also said to have known about the plans of Japanese search teams searching for the fugitives and their helpers.

== Arrest and beheading ==
The Japanese had long suspected that Dueñas knew a great deal about the only American to escape capture, George Tweed. In July 1944, Dueñas was informed about Japanese plans to arrest him, but refused to escape. He told the men who hoped to assist him that the Japanese would retaliate against their families, reportedly saying, "Go look after your families. God will look after me. I have done no wrong." On 8 July, Dueñas was captured and interrogated about the whereabouts of Tweed, Dueñas is said to have responded, "It is for me to know, and for you to find out." He added that he answered only to God and "the Japanese are not God." The same day 41 people were beheaded at a concentration camp nearby. The next day on 9 July the Japanese summoned his nephew Eduardo Camacho “Eddie” Dueñas who was the former Island Attorney, and arrested him as well, Juan and Eddie were taken to the Kempeitai headquarters in Agaña Heights. The Japanese would torture the two for three days. In the early morning of 12 July 1944 Juan and Eddie were taken to the Kaikontai headquarters at Ta'i, Mangliao. The Japanese would then behead Juan and Eddie Dueñas, two other Chamarro men, 50-year-old Juan Unpingco Pangelinan and an unidentified man were also beheaded.

== Legacy and honor ==
In early 1945, the body of Fr. Dueñas was exhumed from a crude grave. When his body was buried at St. Joseph's Church in Inarajan, hundreds of people and the island's highest officials attended the ceremony. The Father Dueñas Memorial School (FDMS) was established in 1948 in his memory. In 1970, Guam officially designated July 12 as "Father Dueñas Day."
