= Felixberto Camacho Flores =

Chamorro prelate

His Excellency Felixberto Camacho Flores
- Metropolitan Archbishop of Agana
- See: Agana, Guam
- Installed: April 21, 1971
- Term ended: October 25, 1985
- Predecessor: Apollinaris William Baumgartner
- Successor: Anthony Sablan Apuron
- Other post: Titular Bishop of Stagnum (1970)

Orders
- Ordination: April 30, 1949
- Consecration: May 17, 1970

Personal details
- Born: January 23, 1921 Agana, Guam
- Died: October 25, 1985 (aged 64) San Francisco, California
- Buried: Dulce Nombre de María Cathedral-Basilica
- Denomination: Roman Catholic
- Coat of arms

Felixberto Camacho Flores (January 23, 1921 – October 25, 1985) was a Roman Catholic prelate who served as Archbishop of Agaña from April 21, 1971, to his death October 25, 1985.

Born in Agaña, Guam, Flores was ordained a priest on April 30, 1945, in the Capuchin order. On February 5, 1970, he was appointed apostolic administrator of the Archdiocese of Agaña and titular bishop of Stagnum, and was consecrated on May 17, 1970. On May 24, 1971, he was appointed bishop of the Agaña Diocese and then was appointed archbishop of Agaña. He died while still in office.

== Notes ==
Catholic Church titles
| Preceded by Apollinaris William Baumgartner | Archbishop of Agana; 1971–1985 | Succeeded by Anthony Sablan Apuron |
