= Michelle Ye Hee Lee =

American journalist (born 1988)

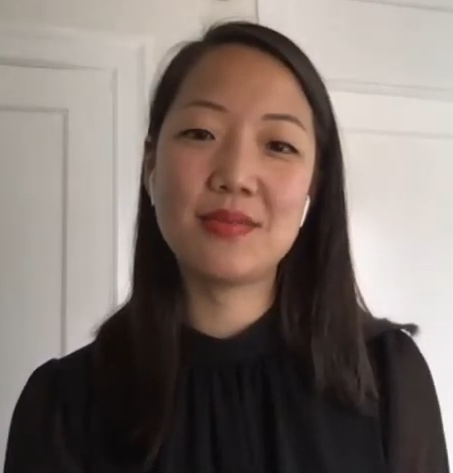
- Born: June 13, 1988 (age 38); Seoul, South Korea
- Citizenship: American
- Education: Emory University
- Occupation: Journalist
- Years active: 2006–present
- Employer: The Washington Post

Michelle Ye Hee Lee (born June 13, 1988) is an American journalist who is the Tokyo bureau chief of The Washington Post as of 2020. She previously served as the president of the Asian American Journalists Association.

== Early life ==
Lee was born in 1988 in Seoul. She and her mother immigrated to the United States in 1995, initially settling in Warren, Ohio before moving to Guam, where she spent much of her childhood. Lee became interested in journalism after attending a writing camp at Duke University. At the age of 15, she worked as an intern with Pacific Daily News through the "VIBE" high-school internship program. She attended and graduated from the Academy of Our Lady of Guam, an all-girls Catholic high school in Hagåtña.

In 2008, she was an intern at Creative Loafing, an Atlanta-based publisher of a monthly arts and culture newspaper/magazine. A year later, she became an intern at Chicago Tribune. She graduated from Emory University with a Bachelor's degree in International Studies and English in 2010. During her time in Emory, she served as editor-in-chief of the student newspaper The Emory Wheel from 2009 to 2010. She was naturalized as a U.S citizen in 2011.

== Career ==
After graduation from university, Lee served as government accountability reporter with The Arizona Republic, where she covered public money, regulatory loopholes and state and county politics of Arizona. For the reporting of Yarnell Hill Fire in 2013, Lee and her staff at the Arizona Republic were finalists for the 2014 Pulitzer Prize. For her investigation into Arizona's failures in tracking and monitoring homeless sex offenders, she was named a finalist for the Livingston Awards for Young Journalists.

In 2014, she joined The Washington Post and wrote for the Washington Post "Fact Checker", which rates statements by politicians, usually on a range of one to four Pinocchios – with one Pinocchio for minor shading of the facts and four Pinocchios for outright lies. If the statement is truthful, the person will get a rare "Geppetto". In 2017 Lee left the fact-checking team and moved to the Post's political enterprise and investigations section, where she covered money and influence in American politics.

With The Washington Post, she reported on the 2018 North Korea–United States Singapore Summit from Seoul. Lee is currently a member of the Investigative Reporters and Editors and lectured students at a local high school through Press Pass Mentors program.

In 2017, she was elected as the President of the Asian American Journalists Association (AAJA), which is a membership nonprofit responsible for advancing diversity in newsrooms, and ensuring fair and accurate coverage of communities of color. In August 2020, Lee was re-elected to serve as the President of AAJA for a second term. She served this position till 2022 and was succeeded by Nicole Dungca.

In December 2020, she was appointed as Tokyo bureau chief of The Washington Post. The assignment carries responsibility of reporting on Japan, North Korea and South Korea.
