= Santiago López de Rego y Labarta =

Spanish bishop

The Most Reverend Santiago López de Rego y Labarta
- Bishop
- Church: Roman Catholic Church
- Diocese: Caroline Islands
- Elected: 1923
- In office: 1923 – 23 August 1941

Orders
- Ordination: 1903
- Consecration: 1923
- Rank: Bishop

Personal details
- Born: Santiago López de Rego y Labarta; March 3, 1869 Santiago de Compostela, Spain
- Died: August 23, 1941 (aged 72)
- Denomination: Catholic

Santiago López de Rego y Labarta (3 March 1869 – 23 August 1941) was a Spanish clergyman and bishop for the Roman Catholic Diocese of Caroline Islands. He was born in Santiago de Compostela. He became ordained in 1903. He was appointed bishop in 1923. He died on 23 August 1941, at the age of 72.
