= Diocese of Chalan Kanoa =

Latin Catholic jurisdiction in the Northern Mariana Islands

Coordinates: 15°10′27″N 145°44′56″E

Diocese of Chalan Kanoa Diœcesis Vialembensis
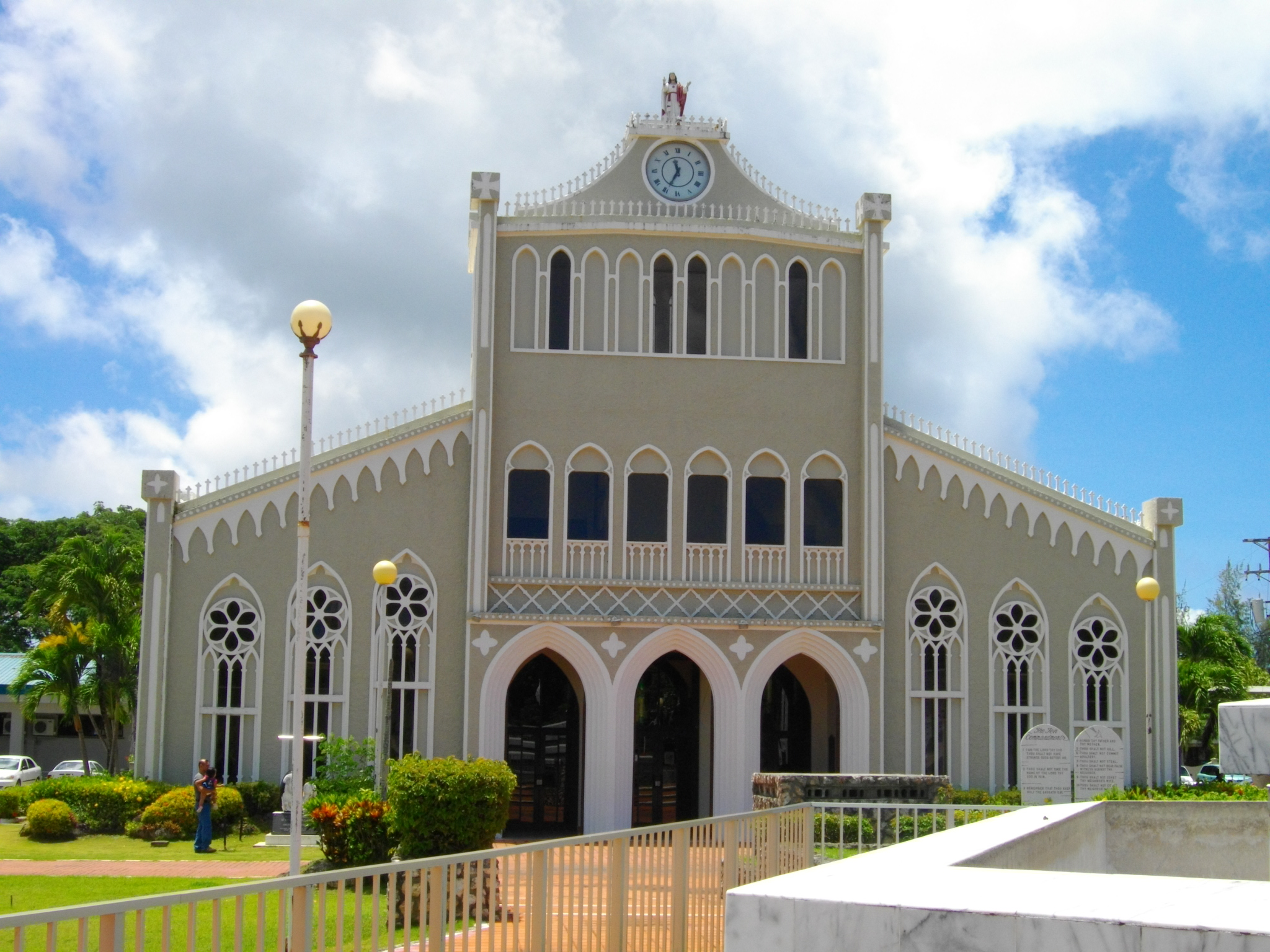
- Our Lady of Mt. Carmel Cathedral in Saipan

- Coat of arms

Location
- Country: United States
- Territory: Northern Mariana Islands, Commonwealth of the Northern Mariana Islands
- Ecclesiastical province: Agaña

Statistics
- Area: 184 sq mi (480 km^{2})
- Population: Total; Catholics: (as of 2006); 71,850; 43,000 (59.8%)
- Parishes: 12

Information
- Denomination: Catholic
- Sui iuris church: Latin Church
- Rite: Roman Rite
- Established: 8 November 1984 (41 years ago)
- Cathedral: Our Lady of Mount Carmel Cathedral

Current leadership
- Pope: Leo XIV
- Bishop: Romeo Duetao Convocar

Map
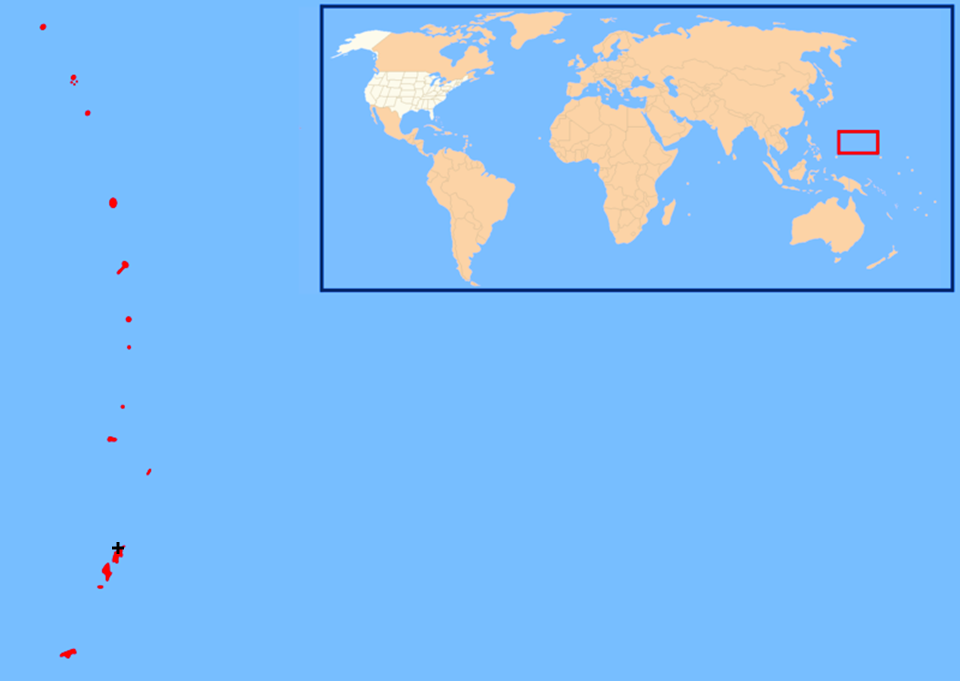

Website
- rcdck.org

The Diocese of Chalan Kanoa (Latin: Diœcesis Vialembensis) is a diocese of the Catholic Church in the United States. It comprises the territory of the Commonwealth of the Northern Mariana Islands and is a suffragan of the Metropolitan Archdiocese of Agaña. The diocese was canonically erected in 1984; the mother church, the Our Lady of Mount Carmel Cathedral, is on Saipan.

== Bishops ==
- Tomas Aguon Camacho (1984–2010)
- Ryan Pagente Jimenez (Apostolic Administrator: 2010–2016) (Bishop: 2016–2024)
- Romeo Duetao Convocar (2025-present)
