= Tammy Flores Garman Schoenen =

Postmaster of Guam

Joanne M. Brown

Postmaster of Guam
- Incumbent
- Assumed office April 4, 2015
- Preceded by: Emmanuel Thomas

Personal details
- Spouse: Felix
- Education: University of Guam
- Occupation: Postmaster

Tammy Flores Garman Schoenen is the first female postmaster of Guam.

== Early life ==
Schoenen grew up in Guam. Schoenen graduated from Academy of Our Lady of Guam, an all-girls Catholic high school located in Hagåtña, Guam.

== Education ==
Schoenen graduated from University of Guam.

== Career ==
Schoenen started her postal career as a clerk at the Barrigada Main Postal Facility in Guam. Schoenen eventually became a Customer Services Supervisor at the Barrigada Main Postal Facility in Barrigada, Guam.

On April 4, 2015, Schoenen became the 15th postmaster of Guam and the first female postmaster of Guam. Schoenen replaced Emmanuel Thomas, who transferred to a postal management position in Illinois. The installation ceremony took place at the John Pangelinan Gerber Barrigada Post Office in Barrigada, Guam. Felix Bagoyo, Post Office Operations Manager, officiated the administration of the Postmaster’s Oath of Office to Schoenen. Greg Wolny, USPS District Manager, also attended the swear-in ceremony.

== Personal life ==
Schoenen's husband is Felix. Schoenen and her family live in Yigo, Guam.
