= Amando Samo =

Micronesian Catholic bishop (1948–2021)

- Bishop of the Caroline Islands

Orders
- Ordination: 1977
- Consecration: 1987

Personal details
- Born: 16 August 1948 Moch, Chuuk
- Died: 7 August 2021 (aged 72)
- Education: Chaminade University of Honolulu
- Motto: To live is Christ
- Coat of arms

Amando Samo (16 August 1948 – 7 August 2021) was a Catholic bishop.

Samo was born on Moch Island, in the state of Chuuk, Federated States of Micronesia. Ordained to the priesthood in 1977, in 1987 he was named titular bishop of Liberta and auxiliary bishop of the Roman Catholic Diocese of Caroline Islands, Micronesia.

From 1994 to 1995, he served as coadjutor bishop of the diocese. From 1995 to 2020, Samo was bishop of the diocese.
