= Spanish National Cardiovascular Research Centre =

Spanish research institute

The National Centre for Cardiovascular Research (Spanish: Centro Nacional de Investigaciones Cardiovasculares or CNIC) is a Spanish research institute. The Centre was founded in 1999 and has purpose-built facilities on the campus of the Carlos III Health Institute in Madrid. The director is Valentín Fuster.

Since 2005, the institute has been supported by the Government and by a group of leading Spanish companies and charitable foundations (the Pro-CNIC Foundation).

== Research programmes ==
In 2010, Felipe Pétriz, Secretary of State for Research, and Emilio Botín, President of the Santander Group, signed an agreement to launch the CNIC-Santander PESA study (Progression of Early Subclinical Atherosclerosis). This prospective study, which in 2019 concluded its first phase, was aimed at advancing knowledge on the progression of cardiovascular disease.
