= Archdiocese of Agaña =

Latin Catholic jurisdiction in Guam

Coordinates: 13°28′27″N 144°45′08″E

Archdiocese of Agaña Archidiœcesis Aganiensis Arquidiócesis de Agaña
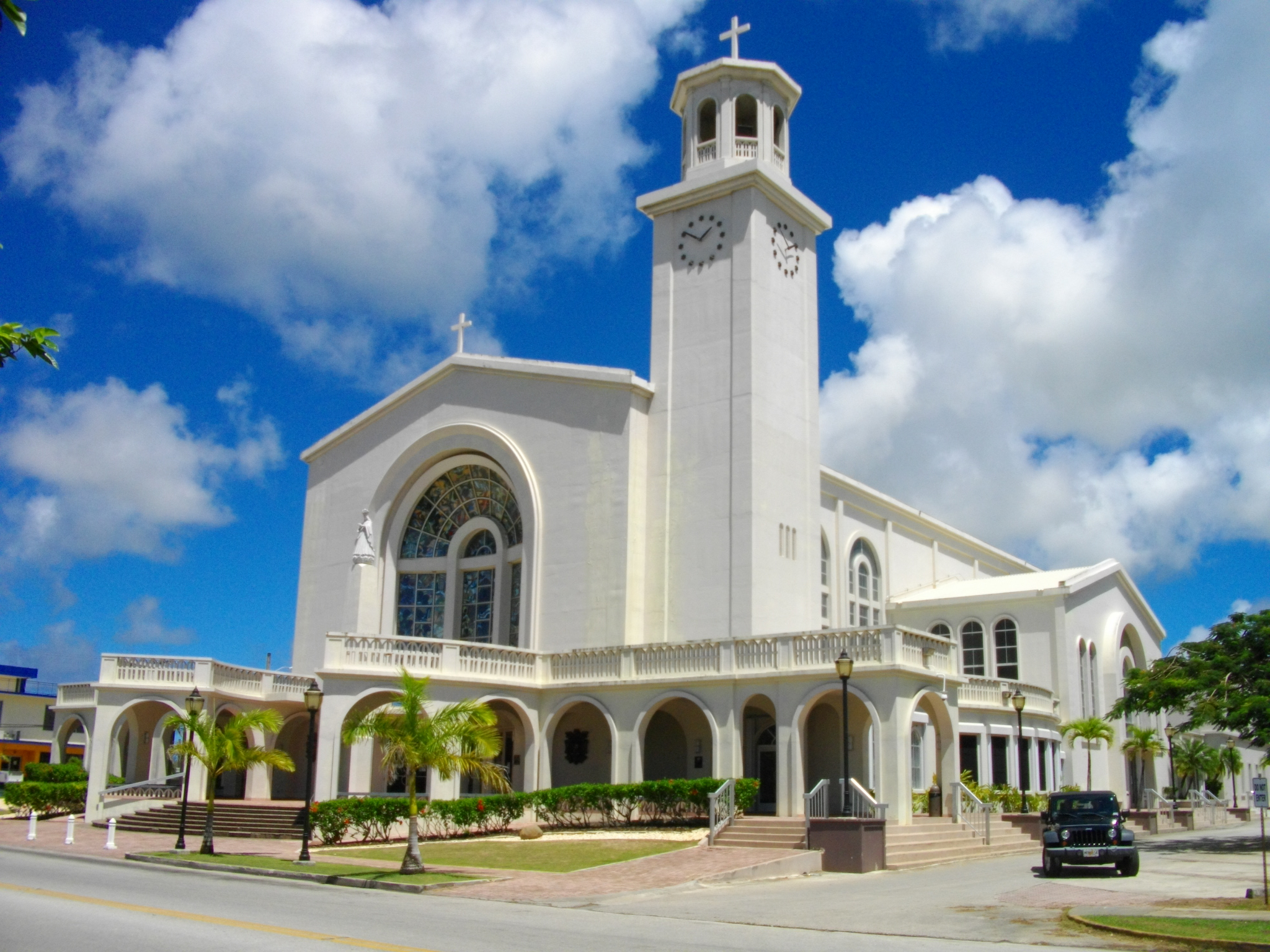
- Dulce Nombre de Maria Cathedral Basilica

- Coat of arms

Location
- Country: United States
- Territory: Guam
- Ecclesiastical province: Ecclesiastical province of Agaña

Statistics
- Area: 215 sq mi (560 km^{2})
- Population: Total; Catholics: (as of 2006); 155,687; 132,494 (85.1%)
- Parishes: 26

Information
- Denomination: Catholic
- Sui iuris church: Latin Church
- Rite: Roman Rite
- Established: March 1, 1911 (115 years ago)
- Cathedral: Dulce Nombre de Maria Cathedral Basilica

Current leadership
- Pope: Leo XIV
- Metropolitan Archbishop: Ryan Pagente Jimenez
- Vicar General: Fr. Jeffrey San Nicolas
- Bishops emeritus: Anthony Sablan Apuron

Map
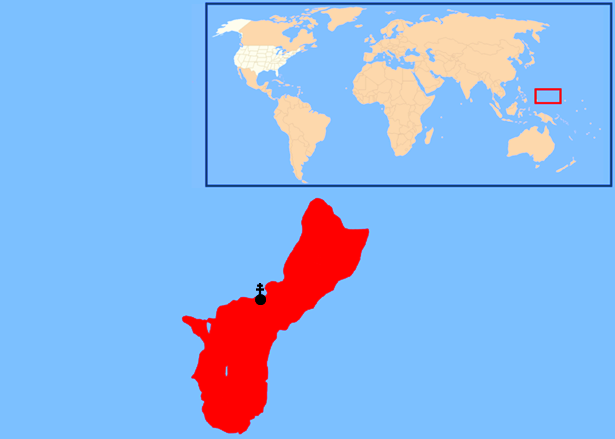

Website
- archagana.org

The Archdiocese of Agaña (Latin: Archidiœcesis Aganiensis , Spanish: Arquidiócesis de Agaña) is a Latin Church ecclesiastical territory or diocese. It comprises the United States dependency of Guam. The prelate is an archbishop whose cathedral is the Dulce Nombre de Maria Cathedral-Basilica.

The archdiocese is a member of the Episcopal Conference of the Pacific (CEPAC) and of the Federation of Catholic Bishops Conferences of Oceania, and an observer to the United States Conference of Catholic Bishops.

== History ==
The first Catholic church was established on Guam on June 15, 1668 by Spanish-Filipino missionaries Diego Luis de San Vitores and Pedro Calungsod. Catholics in Guam were part of the Diocese of Cebu, the Philippines. The United States acquired Guam from Spain after the Spanish–American War of 1898. On September 17, 1902, the Apostolic Prefecture of Mariana Islands was established which included Guam.

=== 1911 to 1999 ===
On March 1, 1911, the Apostolic Vicariate of Guam was canonically erected. On July 4, 1946, territory was added from the suppressed Vicariate Apostolic of Marianne, Caroline, and Marshall Islands.

On October 14, 1965, the Vatican elevated the apostolic vicariate to the Diocese of Agaña, as a suffragan diocese to the Roman Catholic Archdiocese of San Francisco.

On March 8, 1984, in response to the growth of Catholicism in Guam and its vicinity, the diocese was elevated to a metropolitan see, the Archdiocese and Metropolitan Province of Agaña. The metropolitan province consists of the Archdiocese of Agaña and its suffragan Roman Catholic Dioceses of Chalan Kanoa and of Caroline Islands, and the Roman Catholic Apostolic Prefecture of the Marshall Islands.

=== 2000 to 2020 ===
In 2016, for the first time in the history of the archdiocese, sexual allegations surfaced against its Ordinary (at the time Archbishop Anthony Apuron). Consequently, on June 6, 2016, Pope Francis appointed Archbishop Savio Hon Tai-Fai, S.D.B., as apostolic administrator sede plena, i.e., in charge of the pastoral and administrative governance of the local Church.

On October 31, 2016, after months of an Apostolic Administration, Pope Francis appointed Michael J. Byrnes of the Archdiocese of Detroit to become Coadjutor Archbishop of Agaña with special faculties. Those faculties included complete authority in all pastoral and administrative matters in the Archdiocese, both civilly and ecclesiastically.

On March 16, 2018, Archbishop Apuron was removed from office by a Vatican tribunal after being convicted of undisclosed charges in a canonical penal trial. Apuron appealed the decision, which suspended the verdict. However, the verdict of the First Instance canonical penal trial was upheld by the Apostolic Tribunal of the Congregation for the Doctrine of the Faith (CDF) on February 7, 2019. A final ruling was then published by the CDF on April 4, 2019, which also upheld the conviction. The final ruling made so Apuron could not only no longer serve as Bishop, but also could no longer wear the "insignia" associated with it, such as a bishop's ring, miter and staff, or dwell in property owned by the Archdiocese of Agana.

The penalties imposed by the Apostolic Tribunal of the Congregation for the Doctrine of the Faith included the privation of office; the perpetual prohibition from dwelling, even temporarily, in the jurisdiction of the Archdiocese of Agaña; and the perpetual prohibition from using the insignia attached to the rank of Bishop.

The Congregation for the Doctrine of the Faith declared that this decision represented the definitive conclusion in the penal trial, and no further appeal is possible.

On January 15, 2019 it was announced that the Archdiocese filed for Chapter 11 bankruptcy due to the financial burden created by the overwhelming amount of sex abuse lawsuits. In August 2019, it was revealed that 223 people had filed lawsuits against 35 clergymen, teachers and Boy Scout leaders tied to the Catholic Church whom they accused of sexually abusing them while serving with the Archdiocese of Agaña. Despite the bankruptcy filing, the archdiocese had only $45 million in liabilities and had until August 15, 2019, to successfully file a motion for a settlement with the sex abuse victims. Documents obtained by the Associated Press also revealed that claims of sexual abuse in the Archdiocese of Agaña dated as early as the 1950s and as recent as 2013. The archdiocese afterwards sold its Yona property for $6.1 million to help contribute to the pending settlement. By the time of the August 15 deadline, which also accounted for sex abuse claims, was reached, the number of people suing the Archdiocese for sex abuse had expanded to more than 240, with blame also being directed at the Bishop's residence and office in Hagatna.

Both the Archdiocese and sex abuse survivors negotiated for a settlement between October 30 and 31 2019. It was agreed that there would be direct mediation during the negotiations as well. Guam served as the location for the negotiations as well. The Boy Scouts of America, the Capuchin Franciscans, and some of the people named as defendants in the lawsuits had already started making settlements with clergy sex abuse survivors since 2018. Shortly before the negotiations started, the number of sex abuse claims also expanded to nearly 280. However, the October 2019 negotiations, which were mediated by U.S. Bankruptcy Judge for the District of Hawaii Robert J. Faris, were cut short after the survivors rejected the settlement offers and continued to pursue their lawsuits. On January 15, 2020, the Archdiocese of Agana submitted its reorganization plan, which also involved a new offer for a $21 million settlement. However, it remained to be seen if the sex abuse survivors will approve of the new settlement offer.

On April 30, 2020, attorneys ended most court litigation after the Archdiocese of Agana filed proof of claim in court to help ensure the bankruptcy agreement, which also includes the potential sex abuse settlement, would go forward. The same day, however, it was revealed in new court documents that a new lawsuit was filed against the Archdiocese of Agana by a former altar boy who claimed that Father Louis Brouillard abused him multiple times from around 1978 to 1979 on the grounds of the Barrigada church and during Boy Scouts of America outings at Lonfit River. On March 23, 2021, US Federal District Judge Frances Tydingco-Gatewood denied Apuron's motion to temporarily halt proceedings in Guam's clergy sex abuse cases. In August 2021, court filings which were made public revealed the Apuron had testified in court to deny a former Father Duenas Memorial School student's allegations that Apuron raped and sexually abused him multiple times in the school year 1994-1995 at the then-archbishop's private residence in Agana Heights.

On March 16, 2020, the Archdiocese of Agana suspended Sunday masses along with all parish events until April 18th of that year. During this time, masses were held virtually, with church-goers watching church broadcasts through radio stations and social media platforms, such as Facebook Live.

=== 2021 to present ===
On March 29, 2023, Archbishop Michael J. Byrnes resigned due to a "life-changing illness", leaving Vicar General Father Romeo Convocar to lead the church in his absence. On July 6th, 2024, Pope Francis appointed Bishop Ryan P. Jimenez as the new Archbishop of Agana. He was Installed on August 15th, 2024.

== Ordinaries ==
No.	Name	From	Until
1	Francisco Xavier Vilá y Mateu, OFMCap	August 25, 1911	January 1, 1913
2	Agustín José Bernaus y Serra, OFMCap	May 9, 1913	September 14, 1913
3	Joaquín Felipe Oláiz y Zabalza, OFMCap	July 20, 1914	January 1, 1933
4	León Angel Olano y Urteaga, OFMCap	July 9, 1934	August 20, 1945
5	Apollinaris William Baumgartner, OFMCap	October 14, 1945	December 18, 1970
6	Felixberto Camacho Flores	April 21, 1971	October 25, 1985
7	Anthony Sablan Apuron, OFMCap	May 11, 1986	March 16, 2018
8	Michael J. Byrnes	April 4, 2019	March 28, 2023
9	Ryan Pagente Jimenez	July 6, 2024	Present

Serra was appointed Vicar Apostolic of Bluefields, Nicaragua in 1913.
Apuron was Auxiliary Bishop (1983-1986); appointed Archbishop here.
Byrnes was Coadjutor Archbishop (2016-2019).

== Education ==
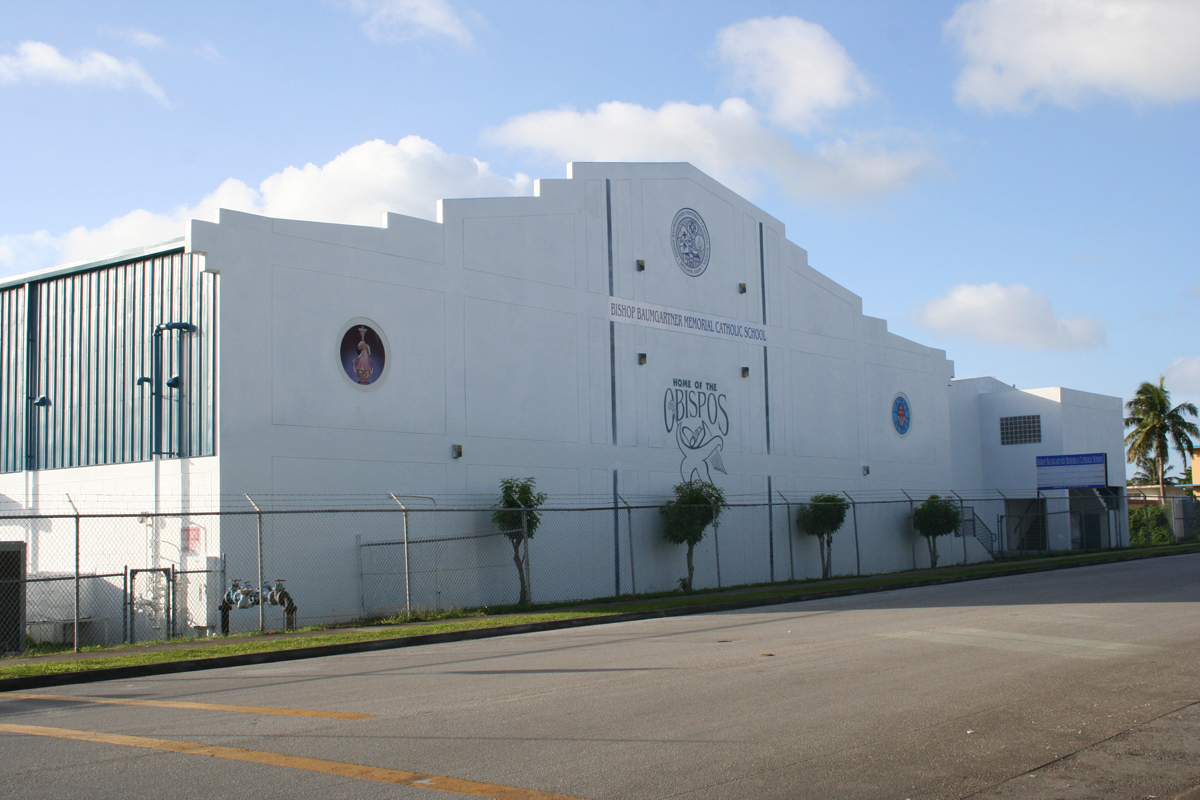
Bishop Baumgartner Memorial School – Sinajana

Schools operated by the archdiocese include:

- Academy of Our Lady of Guam– Hagåtña – Secondary school for girls
- Bishop Baumgartner Memorial School– Sinajana
- Saint Anthony Catholic School– Tamuning
- Santa Barbara Catholic School– Dededo

Schools previously operated by the archdiocese include:

High schools:

- Father Dueñas Memorial School – Mangilao – boys
- Notre Dame High School – Talofofo – coed

Elementary and middle schools:

- Mount Carmel School – Agat
- St. Francis Catholic School – Yona
- San Vicente School – Barrigada

Elementary schools:

- Dominican School– Yigo

== Parishes ==
The Archdiocese of Agaña consists of twenty-six parishes on the island of Guam:

Northern Region

- Sånta Bernadita - Agafa Gumas, Yigo
- Sånta Barbara - Dededo
- Saint Andrew Kim - Dededo
- Saint Anthony of Padua and Saint Victor - Tamuning
- Blessed Diego Luis de San Vitores - Tumon
- Our Lady of Lourdes - Yigo

Central I Region

- Dulce Nombre de María Cathedral-Basilica - Agaña (Hagåtña)
- San Vicente Ferrer and San Roke - Barrigada
- Nuestra Señora de la Paz y Buen Viaje - Chalan Pågo
- Sånta Teresita - Mangilao
- Nuestra Señora de las Aguas - Mongmong
- Immaculate Heart of Mary - Toto

Central II Region

- Our Lady of the Blessed Sacrament - Agaña Heights
- Niño Perdido y Sagrada Familia - Asan
- Our Lady of Purification - Maina
- San Juan Bautista - Ordot
- Saint Jude Thaddeus - Sinajaña
- Assumption of Our Lady - Piti

Southern Region

- Our Lady of Mount Carmel - Agat
- Saint Joseph - Inarajan
- San Isidro - Malojloj
- San Dimas - Merizo
- San Dionisio - Umatac
- Our Lady of Guadalupe - Santa Rita
- San Miguel - Talofofo
- San Francisco de Asis - Yona

== Demographics ==
Year	Population			Priests				Deacons	Religious		Parishes
Year	Catholic	Total	Percent Catholic	Diocesan	Religious	Total	Catholics per priest	Deacons	Male	Female	Parishes
1911	9,740	12,240	79.6%	0	10	10	974	0	13	n/a	6
1950	32,209	32,700	98.5%	3	24	27	1,192	0	44	120	17
1966	60,046	62,240	96.5%	15	26	41	1,464	0	26	206	24
1970	80,872	115,000	70.3%	23	55	78	1,036	0	57	213	24
1976	111,831	141,871	78.8%	26	28	54	2,070	18	36	148	31
1980	120,659	129,428	93.2%	19	32	51	2,365	11	43	146	35
1990	114,404	126,169	90.7%	19	27	46	2,487	5	29	143	26
1999	122,962	144,997	84.8%	28	15	43	2,859	9	20	120	24
2000	122,962	144,867	84.9%	27	10	37	3,323	9	15	120	24
2001	150,563	167,292	90.0%	31	16	47	3,203	7	22	125	24
2002	125,167	154,805	89.9%	33	5	38	3,293	9	21	120	24
2003	131,430	154,623	85.0%	32	15	47	2,796	8	21	120	24
2004	131,584	154,805	85.0%	32	15	47	2,799	20	16	120	24
2006	132,494	155,687	85.1%	30	12	42	3,154	20	12	103	24
2012	157,000	184,000	85.3%	38	9	47	3,340	17	9	100	24
Sources: 1911: 1950–2012:

== See also ==
- Catholic Church by country
- Catholic Church in the United States
- Ecclesiastical Province of Agaña
- Global organisation of the Catholic Church
- List of Roman Catholic archdioceses (by country and continent)
- List of Roman Catholic dioceses (alphabetical) (including archdioceses)
- List of Roman Catholic dioceses (structured view) (including archdioceses)
- List of the Catholic dioceses of the United States
