= Francis Xavier Hiroaki Nakano =

Bishop of Kagoshima

- Church: Catholic Church
- Diocese: Kagoshima
- Elected: 7 July 2018
- In office: 8 October 2018

Orders
- Ordination: 2 April 1978 by Paul Shinichi Itonaga
- Consecration: 8 October 2018 by Paul Kenjiro Koriyama, Thomas Aquino Manyo Maeda, Joseph Mitsuaki Takami

Personal details
- Born: April 15, 1951 (age 75) Kagoshima, Japan
- Education: Saint Sulpice Seminary, Fukuoka

Hiroaki Nakano (born April 15, 1951) is a Japanese Catholic clergyman and current bishop of the Roman Catholic Diocese of Kagoshima. His baptismal name is Francis Xavier.

== Biography ==
Nakano was born on 15 April 1951 in Kagoshima City and baptized at St. Francis Xavier Cathedral, Kagoshima. He was educated at Nagasaki Catholic Theological Seminary, and also studied philosophy and theology at Saint Sulpice Seminary, Fukuoka. On 2 April 1978, he was ordained a priest at St. Francis Xavier Cathedral.

From 1978 to 1981, he was in charge of public relations for the diocesan see and editor-in-chief of the Diocesan Bulletin. From 1981 to 1984, he was a priest of Kamoike church. From 1984 to 1988, he studied in Rome and obtained a diploma in doctrinal studies at the Pontifical University of Urbano. After returning to Japan, from 1988 to 1993 was the pastor of Tamari church, from 1993 to 2005 the pastor of Naze Church, from 2005 to 2009 the head of the parish office, from 2009 to 2011 the rector of St. Francis Xavier Cathedral.

From August 2011, he served at Fukuoka Campus of the Japanese Catholic Theological Seminary, and from April 2012, he served the Tokyo campus. In April 2013, he became vice-director through until his appointment as bishop in 2018.

On July 7, 2018, he was appointed bishop of the Diocese of Kagoshima by Pope Francis and consecrated on October 8. His predecessor Paul Kenjiro Koriyama was principal consecrator, co-consecrated by Thomas Aquino Manyo Maeda, Cardinal Archbishop of Osaka and Joseph Mitsuaki Takami, Archbishop of Roman Catholic Archdiocese of Nagasaki.

He is active in pro-life activism, participating in the Tokyo March for Life and promoting the encyclical Evangelium Vitae in his diocesan newspaper.
