= Combaz =

Combaz is a surname. Notable people with the surname include:

- Christian Combaz (born 1954), French writer and columnist
- Gisbert Combaz (1869–1941), Belgian painter
- Jean Combaz (1896–1974), Belgian architect
- Jean-Claude Combaz (1856–1926), French clergyman and bishop
