= List of Catholic dioceses in Japan =

The episcopate of the Catholic Church in Japan consists solely of a Latin hierarchy, joined in the Catholic Bishops' Conference of Japan.

It comprises fifteen ecclesiastical territories, called (arch)dioceses, led by residential prelate bishops:
three archdioceses, led by Metropolitan Archbishops, whose ecclesiastical provinces of the Roman Catholic Church include a total of twelve suffragan sees.

There are no Eastern Catholic, pre-diocesan or other exempt jurisdictions.

There are no titular sees. All defunct jurisdictions have current successor sees.

There is an Apostolic Nunciature to Japan as papal diplomatic representation at embassy-level in national capital Tokyo.

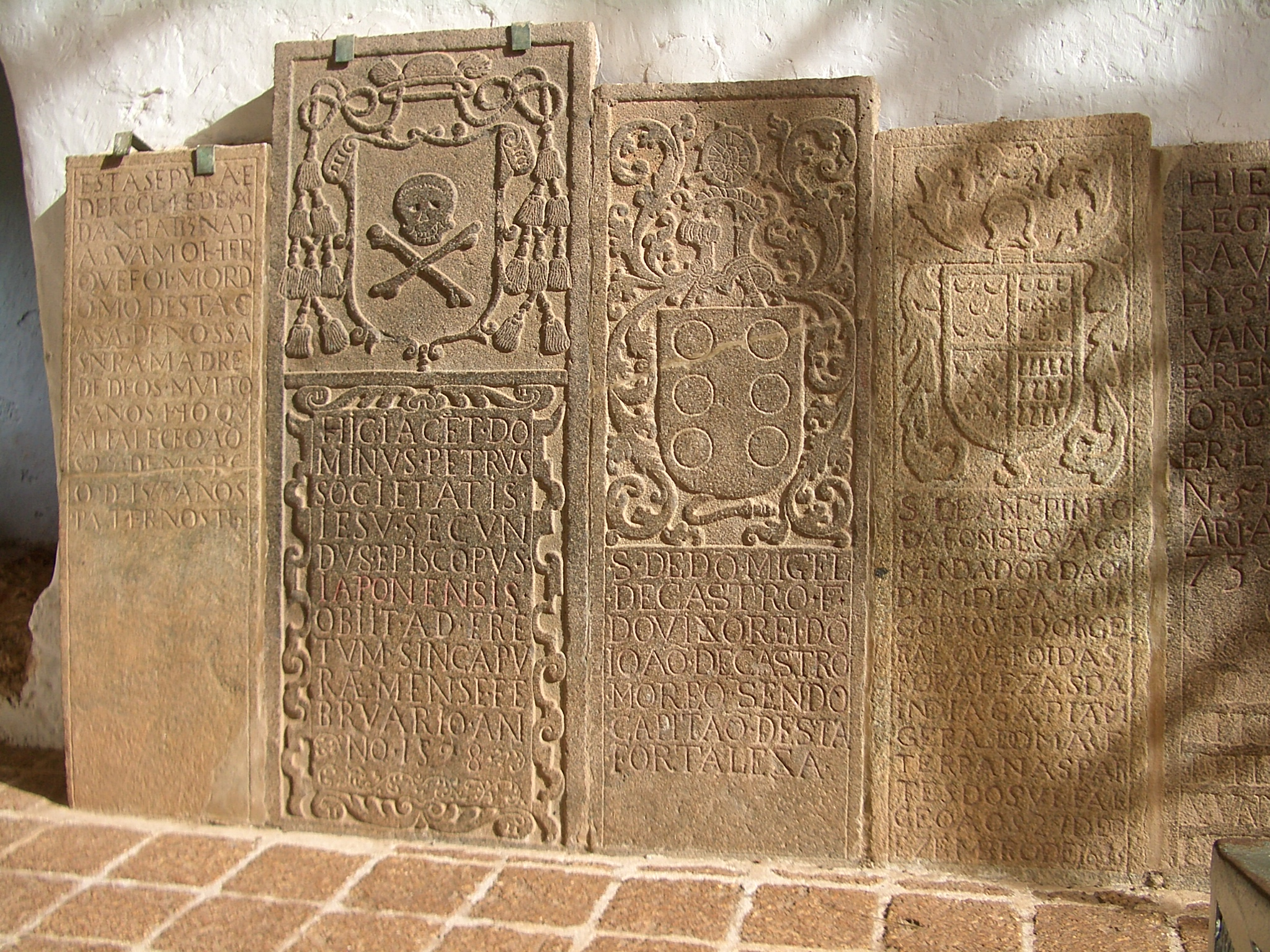
The gravestone (second from the left), in Melaka's St Paul's Church, of someone identified as Peter (?), the "second bishop of Japan", who died in February 1598

== Current Latin dioceses ==
=== Ecclesiastical Province of Nagasaki ===
- Metropolitan Archdiocese of Nagasaki
  - Diocese of Fukuoka
  - Diocese of Kagoshima
  - Diocese of Naha
  - Diocese of Oita

=== Ecclesiastical Province of Osaka ===
- Metropolitan Archdiocese of Osaka-Takamatsu
  - Diocese of Hiroshima
  - Diocese of Kyoto
  - Diocese of Nagoya

=== Ecclesiastical Province of Tokyo ===
- Metropolitan Archdiocese of Tokyo
  - Diocese of Niigata
  - Diocese of Saitama
  - Diocese of Sapporo
  - Diocese of Sendai
  - Diocese of Yokohama

== See also ==
- List of Catholic dioceses (structured view)
- Catholicism in Japan

== Sources and external links ==
- GCatholic - data for all sections
- Catholic Hierarchy Profile of the Catholic Church in Japan
- Map of Japan by Diocese
