= Cerqueira =

Cerqueira is a Portuguese surname.

The Cerqueira Family has its origins best known as coming from Portugal, more specifically from Camposa, in the parish of Vale, in the termo of Arcos de Valdevez around from the 14th century.

Its primary origin is from North of Portugal and Galician region.

== History ==
Among the Cerqueira historical figures, of special note is Luis de Cerqueira (1552-1614), who was a Portuguese Jesuit priest and became bishop of Funai, Japan, overseeing the diocese that included Nagasaki. After joining the Jesuits at 14 and teaching theology in Portugal, he travelled to Japan in 1598, arriving amid the aftermath of the 26 Martyrs execution. His tenure marked the height of early Japanese Catholicism. He actively criticized the slave trade of Japanese women and children, pushing for relief from taxes imposed upon non-Christians that directly fed the slave trade. He died in Nagasaki in 1614, narrowly avoiding the mass expulsion of foreign missionaries by the Tokugawa shogunate later that year. In fact, Cerqueira was the only recorded Jesuit Bishop in Japan during the era of the famous novel Shōgun by author James Clavell and correlates with actual events of William Adams, who was appointed samurai by the shogun Tokugawa Ieyasu after being shipwrecked in Japan in 1600.

Early History: In the Holy Bible in the book of 1 Chronicles 26, 2-19 there is a list of the names of the Guards of the Temple. Since these Levites were not priests, their function was to protect, maintain and transport from the tabernacle of Adonai. When king Solomon inaugurated the first temple (1 Kings 8, 62–66) those of the lineages of these Temple guard families continued their Levitical roles from generation to generation. Past the Babylonian exile of the People of Israel, occurred approximately 609 BCE to 515 BCE, and with the establishment of the Second Temple, many of these family lines continued their services.

With the destruction of the Second Temple in 70 CE came the dispersion of the Jews throughout the Roman territory. These Jews began to settle in small colonies throughout Europe (at that time much of the Roman territory). Those who settled in the north (today Germany and Russia) developed their particularities and became known as Ashkenazis Jews. The term comes from Hebrew medieval for Germany, called Ashkenaz (אשכנז). The Sephardim (in Hebrew ספרדים, Sephardi; plural, Sephardim) is the term used to refer to the descendants of Jews from Portugal and Spain. The word comes from the Hebrew name for the Iberian Peninsula (Sepharad, ספרד.) The lineages of temple guards who went to Portugal were known as Sekher (transliteration from Hebrew to dam), סכר in Hebrew. With the anti-Semitism and persecutions by the Catholics who recaptured the region around of the 12th century, many Jews changed their surnames even before the official beginning of the inquisition.

To maintain part of their origins and blend in with non-Jews the Sekher changed their names for Sequeira, Siqueira, Cerqueira, etc. . All these variations arose due to spelling errors when it came time to officially document something in the notary offices of the time. Of that form giving rise to the various branches of families the aforementioned signs and many more. The Cerqueira family mixed with the Portuguese population and after generations they had many of their members truly converting to Christianity and often turning away from its Jewish origins.

In the book Nobuario das Familias de Portugal, we have the following: “Franco Moniz Cerqueira, took the coat of arms of the Cerqueiras in which justified his ancestry in 1530 before Dr. Luiz Teixeira passed the Letter in 30 of March, whose justification is found in the Archivo da Caza de Alvellos de Amarante”. His coat of arms being a "Golden Rampant Lion with a collar around his neck, in a shield red”. The collared lion means loyalty (in this case to the King of Portugal) and as a way of legitimizing his place in the Portuguese nobility, even though he is of Jewish origin (New Christian).

With the establishment of the Portuguese Inquisition by the Catholic Church, we find dozens of Cerqueira's condemned for the practice of Judaism. In the files of the inquisition in the Tower of Tombo de Portugal we find, for example, the processes of Helena de Cerqueira , Margarida Cerqueira , Lucrécia de Cerqueira , Bernarda de Cerqueira , Isabela da Fonseca (daughter de Brás Coelho de Cerqueira), Luís da Silva (spouse of Maria de Cerqueira) and many others, all convicted of the crime of practicing Judaism. In the book “Portuguese Inquisition” includes a list of new Christians from the Azores, among them Dias Cerqueira, a farmer. With the discovery of the Americas, many of these ventured into the “New World”. Being one of those Vicente Cerqueira who, leaving the Azores in Portugal, settled in Ilhéus in Bahia Brazil. From his relationship with Monica Fernandes, Alfredo Fernandes Cerqueira was born (1889), farmer.

== People ==
Notable people with the surname include:

- Luis de Cerqueira Bishop of Japan (1598-1614)
- Washington Stecanela Cerqueira (Washington) Brazilian (1975) footballer
- Flávio Cerqueira (1985) Portuguese footballer
- Carolina Cerqueira Angolan politician, Minister of Social Communication
- Ayres Cerqueira Simao (1988) Brazilian football player
- Helder Diegues Cerqueira de Souza (1963) Portuguese professor of architecture
- José Alves de Cerqueira César (1835–1911), Brazilian politician, governor of the State of São Paulo
- Rogério Cezar de Cerqueira Leite (1931–2024), Brazilian physicist and engineer

== See also ==
- Cerqueira César a municipality in the state of São Paulo in Brazil
- Dionísio Cerqueira a municipality in the state of Santa Catarina in the South region of Brazil
- History of the Catholic Church in Japan - Luis de Cerqueira cited works
