= Sulpizio Shinzo Moriyama =

Japanese Catholic Bishop

Most Reverend Sulpizio Shinzo Moriyama
- Bishop of Oita
- Native name: スルピツィオ 森山信三
- Church: Catholic Church; Latin Church
- Diocese: Oita
- Appointed: 5 April 2022
- Predecessor: Paul Sueo Hamaguchi
- Successor: Incumbent

Orders
- Ordination: 21 March 1988
- Consecration: 3 July 2022 by Peter Michiaki Nakamura

Personal details
- Born: Sulpizio Shinzo Moriyama; 17 January 1959 (age 67) Fukuoka, Japan
- Education: Keio University
- Motto: QUOD CONFRACTUM FUERAT ALLIGABO ET QUOD INFIRMUM FUERAT CONSOLIDABO
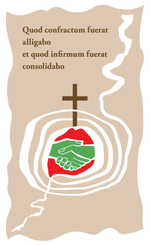
- Coat of arms: Sulpizio Shinzo Moriyama's coat of arms

Sulpizio Shinzo Moriyama is a Japanese Roman Catholic prelate currently serving as the Bishop of the Roman Catholic Diocese of Oita, Japan.

== Early life ==
Moriyama was born on 17 January 1959 in Fukuoka, Japan. He completed his studies in philosophy at the Keio University of Tokyo and in Theology at the St. Sulpizio Seminary in Fukuoka, Japan.

== Priesthood ==
Bishop Moriyama was ordained a priest on 21 March 1988, incardinated in the Roman Catholic Diocese of Fukuoka.

== Episcopate ==
On 5 April 2022, Pope Francis appointed Moriyama as bishop of the Roman Catholic Diocese of Oita. He was Ordained a bishop on 3 July 2022 by Peter Michiaki Nakamura.
