= Diocese of Oita =

Roman Catholic diocese in Japan

Coordinates: 33°14′00″N 131°36′24″E

Diocese of Oita Dioecesis Oitaensis カトリック大分教区

Location
- Country: Japan
- Territory: Ōita and Miyazaki
- Ecclesiastical province: Nagasaki 長崎
- Metropolitan: Nagasaki 長崎

Statistics
- Area: 14,072 km^{2} (5,433 sq mi)
- Population: Total; Catholics: (as of 2004); 2,368,659; 5,764 (0.2%)

Information
- Rite: Latin Rite
- Cathedral: St Francis Xavier Cathedral in Ōita

Current leadership
- Pope: Leo XIV
- Bishop: Sulpizio Shinzo Moriyama
- Metropolitan Archbishop: Peter Michiaki Nakamura

Map
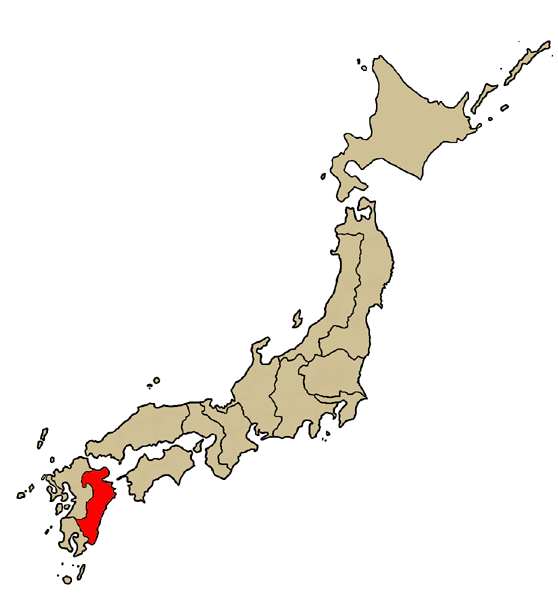

Website
- Website of the Diocese

The Diocese of Oita (Latin: Dioecesis Oitaensis, Japanese: カトリック大分教区, romanized: Katorikku Ōita Kyōku) is a suffragan Latin Church diocese of the Catholic Church in the ecclesiastical province of the metropolitan Nagasaki in southern Japan.

Its cathedral episcopal see is the Cathedral of St. Francis Xavier (Oita Church), in the city of Ōita.

== Diocese of Funai ==
The first Catholic jurisdiction of Otai's territory was established on 19 February 1588, during Portuguese colonial prominence and missionary efforts in the Far East, as the Diocese of Funai (or Funay), on territory split off from the colonial Diocese of Macau.

It was suppressed around 1660, having had the following incumbents (all Portuguese missionary members of Latin Congregations):

- Sebastião de Morais de Funchal, Jesuits (S.J.) (1588.02.19 – death 1588.08.19)
- Pedro Martins, S.J. (1592.02.17 –death 1598.02.18)
- Luis Cerqueira, S.J. (1598.02.18 – death 1614.02.15), succeeding as former Coadjutor Bishop of Funai 府内 (1593.01.29 – 1598.02.18) & Titular Bishop of Tiberias (1593.01.29 – 1598.02.18)
- Diogo Correia Valente (華), S.J. (1618.01.08 – death 1633.10.28), also Apostolic Administrator of mother diocese Macau 澳門 (Macau, Portuguese China) (1626.08.27 – 1633.10.28)
- Apostolic Administrator (1638.02.26 – 1653) Francesco Antonio Frascella, Conventual Franciscans (O.F.M. Conv.), Titular Archbishop of Myra (1637.11.14 – 1653)

== History ==
- Established (restoring its above predecessor at a much lower level) on March 27, 1927 as Mission sui iuris of Miyazaki, on territory split off from the Diocese of Fukuoka
- January 28, 1935: Promoted as Apostolic Prefecture of Miyazaki
- December 22, 1961: Promoted and renamed after its see as Diocese of Oita

== Ordinaries ==
Ecclesiastical Superior of Miyazaki

- Fr. Vincenzo Cimatti (ヴィンチェンツォ・チマッチ), Salesians (S.D.B.) (1928 – 1935.01.28 see below)

Apostolic Prefects of Miyazaki

- Fr. Vincenzo Cimatti (ヴィンチェンツォ・チマッチ), S.D.B. (see above 1935.01.28 – 1940.11.21)
- Apostolic Administrator (1940 – 1945.11.18) Francis Xavier Ichitaro Ideguchi (フランシスコ出口一太郎) while Apostolic Prefect of Kagoshima 鹿児島 (Japan) (1940.06.10 – 1955)
- Apostolic Administrator (1945.11.18 – 1961.12.22) Dominic Senyemon Fukahori (ドミニコ深堀仙右衛門), while Bishop of Fukuoka 福岡 (Japan) (1944.03.09 – 1969.11.15), emeritate as Titular Bishop of Crepedula (1969.11.15 – 1976.08.09)

Suffragan Bishops of Oita

- Peter Saburo Hirata, Sulpicians (P.S.S.) † (22 December 1961 - 15 November 1969 ), later Bishop of Fukuoka 福岡 (Japan) (1969.11.15 – 1990.10.06)
- Peter Takaaki Hirayama (15 November 1969 - 10 May 2000)
- Dominic Ryoji Miyahara (10 May 2000 - 19 March 2008), later Bishop of Fukuoka 福岡 (Japan) (2008.03.19 – 2019.04.27)
- Paul Sueo Hamaguchi (26 June 2011 - 28 December 2020)
- Sulpizio Shinzo Moriyama (5 April 2022 – present)

== See also ==
- Catholic Church in Japan

== Sources ==
- GCatholic.org with incumbent biography links
- Catholic Hierarchy
