= Administration of Ryukyu Islands =

Administration of Ryukyu( Island)s may refer to the following (historical) jurisdictions,

on the Ryukyu Islands in southern Japan :

- United States Civil Administration of the Ryukyu Islands
- Apostolic Administration of Ryukyus (now Roman Catholic Diocese of Naha)
