= Sulpizio =

Sulpizio is the name of:

- Giovanni Sulpizio da Veroli (fl. c. 1470 – 1490), Italian humanist and rhetorician
- Sulpizio Costantino (died 1602), Italian Roman Catholic prelate
- Sulpizio Shinzo Moriyama (born 1959), Japanese Roman Catholic prelate
- Valentina Sulpizio (born 1984), Italian tennis player

== See also ==
- Sulpizio Cardiovascular Center
