= Januarius Kyunosuke Hayasaka =

20th-century Japanese Catholic bishop

ヤヌアリオ 早坂久之助 Januarius Kyunosuke Hayasaka
- Bishop of Nagasaki
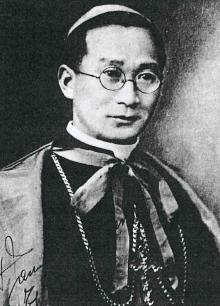
- Church: Catholic Church
- Diocese: Nagasaki
- Installed: April 25, 1928
- Term ended: February 5, 1937
- Predecessor: Jean-Claude Combaz
- Successor: Paul Aijirô Yamaguchi

Orders
- Ordination: June 10, 1917
- Consecration: October 30, 1927

Personal details
- Born: August 14, 1883 (Japan) Miyagi Prefecture, Sendai
- Died: October 26, 1976 (aged 93)
- Coat of arms

Januarius Kyunosuke Hayasaka (1883-1976) was a bishop of the Catholic Church of Showa from Meiji. His baptismal name was "Yanuario".

Hayasaka was the first Japanese-ethnicity bishop. He served as the archbishop of Nagasaki between 1927 and 1937. His brother Kyube Hayasaka also served as bishop of the Diocese Daegu in Korea.
