= Joseph Mitsuaki Takami =

21st-century Japanese Catholic bishop

The Most Reverend Joseph Mitsuaki Takami P.S.S.
- Archbishop Emeritus of Nagasaki
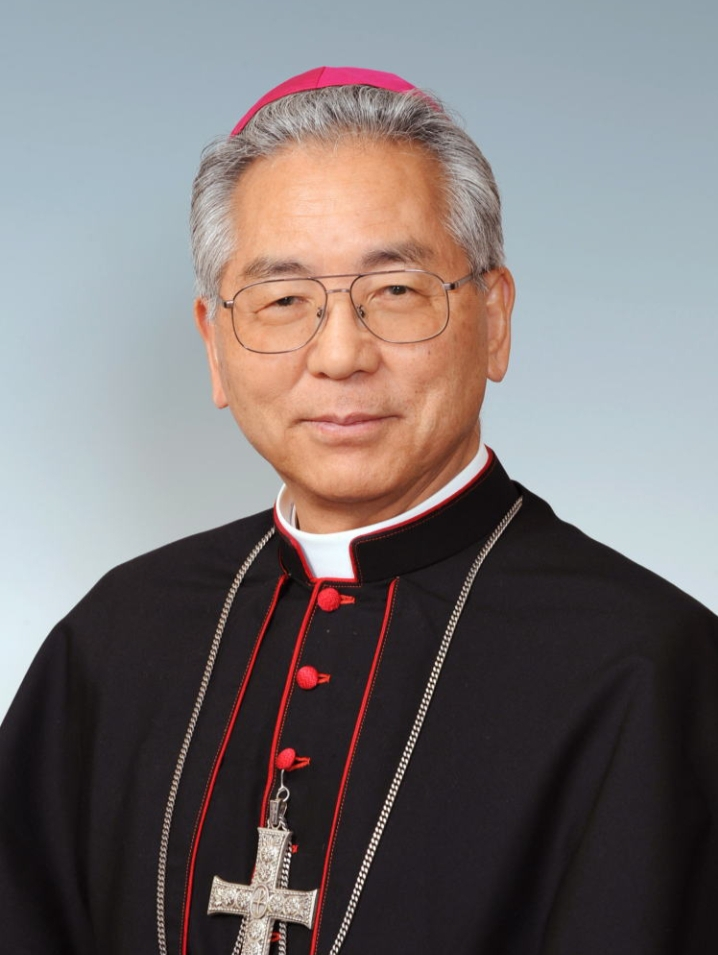
- Native name: 高見三明
- Church: Catholic Church
- Archdiocese: Nagasaki
- See: Nagasaki
- Appointed: 17 October 2003
- Installed: 14 December 2003
- Term ended: 28 December 2021
- Predecessor: Francis Xavier Kaname Shimamoto
- Successor: Peter Michiaki Nakamura
- Other post: President of the Japanese Episcopal Conference (2016-)
- Previous posts: Auxiliary Bishop of Nagasaki (2002-03); Titular Bishop of Munatiana (2002-03); Vice-President of the Japanese Episcopal Conference (2013-16)

Orders
- Ordination: 20 March 1972 by Joseph Asajiro Satowaki
- Consecration: 29 April 2002 by Francis Xavier Kaname Shimamoto

Personal details
- Born: Joseph Mitsuaki Takami; 21 March 1946 (age 80) Nagasaki, Nagasaki Prefecture, Japan
- Motto: Pro Ecclesia et cum Ecclesia
- Coat of arms: Joseph Mitsuaki Takami's coat of arms

Ordination history of Joseph Mitsuaki Takami
History
Priestly ordination
- Ordained by: Joseph Asajiro Satowaki
Episcopal consecration
- Principal consecrator: Francis Xavier Kaname Shimamoto
- Co-consecrators: Peter Takeo Okada, and Joseph Hisajiro Matsunaga
Episcopal succession
Bishops consecrated by Joseph Mitsuaki Takami as principal consecrator
- Paul Sueo Hamaguchi: 26 June 2011
- Wayne Francis Berndt: 12 February 2018
- Peter Michiaki Nakamura: 16 September 2019

Joseph Mitsuaki Takami (born 21 March 1946) is a Japanese prelate of the Catholic Church who served as archbishop of Nagasaki from 2003 to 2021.

== Biography ==
Takami was born in Nagasaki on 21 March 1946. One of his grandmothers, two aunts, and an uncle died when an atomic bomb was dropped on the city in 1945. He was ordained a priest on 20 March 1972 and joined the Sulpicians on 29 October 1973.

From 1973 to 1985 he continued his studies in Rome. He obtained a licentiate in dogmatic theology at the Pontifical Gregorian University and another in sacred scripture at the Pontifical Biblical Institute. He also studied in Paris and Jerusalem. From 1985 to 2002 he taught dogmatic theology and sacred scripture at the Seminary of Saint Sulpitius in Fukuoka, serving as Vice-Rector (1990-1991) and Rector (1993-1998).

On 7 February 2002, Pope John Paul II appointed him auxiliary bishop of Nagasaki. He received his episcopal consecration on 29 April 2002.

He was named archbishop of Nagasaki on 17 October 2003 and served until Pope Francis accepted his resignation on 28 December 2021.

In 2015, following the first archdiocesan synod, he said the archdiocese was experiencing "a deep sense of crisis" with the "withering and enervation" of the Catholic community that had fallen from 75,000 to 62,000 in 30 years.

He has been president of the Catholic Bishops’ Conference of Japan since June 2016.

== Problem in Diocesan Fund ==
A priest in the Catholic Archdiocese of Nagasaki was alleged to have misappropriated a total of 250 million yen in diocesan funds without permission. The archdiocese acknowledged the misappropriation and explained the circumstances in its bulletin "Catholic Kyoho" published on September 1, 2020. The Archbishop stated, "It is all my responsibility and I sincerely apologize."
