= Peter Takaaki Hirayama =

Japanese bishop of the Roman Catholic Church (1924–2023)

His Excellency Peter Takaaki Hirayama
- Bishop Emeritus of Oita
- Native name: 平山高明 (「ペトロ」)
- Archdiocese: Nagasaki
- Appointed: November 15, 1969
- Term ended: May 10, 2000
- Predecessor: Peter Saburō Hirata
- Successor: Dominic Ryōji Miyahara

Orders
- Ordination: March 19, 1957
- Consecration: January 25, 1970 by Bruno Wüstenberg

Personal details
- Born: March 31, 1924 Keijō, Keiki-dō, Korea, Empire of Japan
- Died: July 15, 2023 (aged 99) Oita, Japan

Peter Takaaki Hirayama (March 31, 1924 – July 15, 2023) was a Japanese prelate of the Catholic Church.

Hirayama was born in Seoul and was ordained a priest on March 19, 1957. Hirayama was appointed bishop of the Diocese of Oita on November 15, 1969, and was consecrated on January 25, 1970. Hirayama served in this capacity until his retirement on May 10, 2000.

Catholic Church titles
Preceded by Peter Saburō Hirata	Bishop of Oita; 1969–2000	Succeeded by Dominic Ryōji Miyahara
