= Felix Ley =

Felix Ley Order of Friars Minor Capuchin
- Bishop of Naha
- In office: 1968-1972

Orders
- Ordination: June 14, 1936
- Consecration: June 9, 1968

Personal details
- Born: Alvin Ley; March 5, 1909 Hewitt, Wisconsin, U.S.
- Died: January 23, 1972 (aged 62) Naha, Japan
- Denomination: Roman Catholic
- Coat of arms

Felix Ley (March 5, 1909 - January 23, 1972), Order of Friars Minor Capuchin, was an American prelate of the Roman Catholic Church who served as bishop and the apostolic administrator of Okinawa and the Southern Islands/Ryukyus, now the Diocese of Naha, in Naha, Japan.

== Biography ==
Alvin Ley was born on March 5, 1909 in Hewitt, a village in the Wood County of the U.S. state of Wisconsin, and was ordained to the Roman Catholic priesthood on June 14, 1936.

Father Ley was sent to Guam, where he was taken prisoner by the Japanese army during World War II. He was held prisoner of war at Kobe, Japan. After World War II, he was sent to Okinawa.

On March 11, 1968, Pope Paul VI appointed Felix Ley the apostolic administrator of the Okinawa and the Southern Islands/Ryukyus, and he was consecrated bishop on June 9, 1968. Bishop Ley died on January 23, 1972 in Naha, Japan.

== Notes ==
Catholic Church titles
Preceded by None	Bishop of Naha; 1968–1972	Succeeded by Peter Baptist Tadamaro Ishigami
