= Hewitt, Wood County, Wisconsin =

Hewitt
- Village
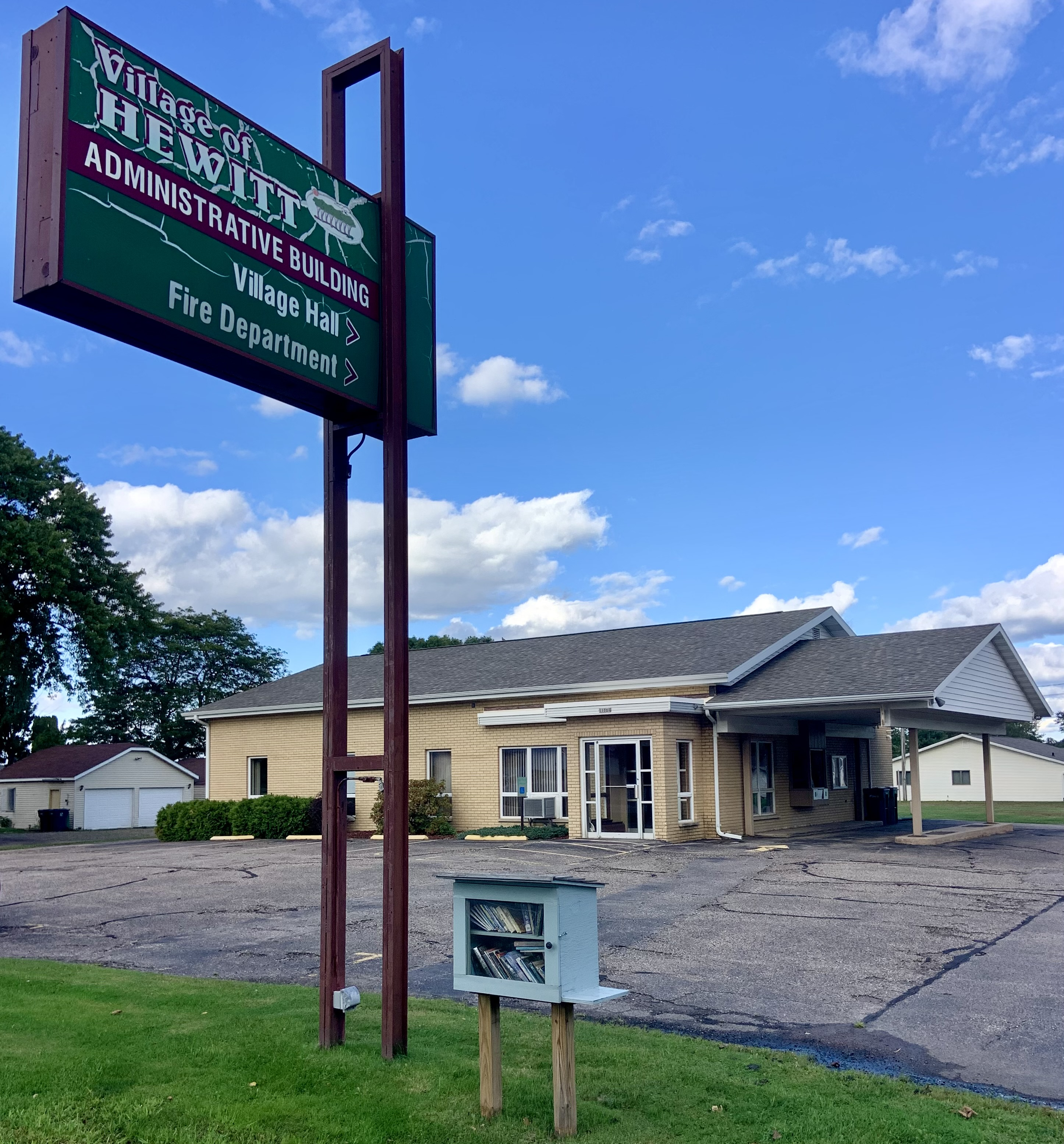
- Village hall

- Location of Hewitt in Wood County, Wisconsin.

- Location within the state of Wisconsin
- Coordinates: 44°38′24″N 90°6′26″W
- Country: United States
- State: Wisconsin
- County: Wood
- Incorporated: April 2, 1973

Area
  - Total: 0.93 sq mi (2.41 km^{2})
  - Land: 0.93 sq mi (2.41 km^{2})
  - Water: 0 sq mi (0.00 km^{2})

Population (2020)
  - Total: 796
  - Density: 855/sq mi (330/km^{2})
- Time zone: UTC-6 (Central (CST))
  - Summer (DST): UTC-5 (CDT)
- Zip code(s): 54441
- Area codes: 715 & 534
- FIPS code: 55-34250
- GNIS feature ID: 1583384
- Website: Official website

Hewitt is a village in Wood County, Wisconsin, United States. The population was 796 at the 2020 census.

== History ==
In 1872 the Wisconsin Central Railroad laid tracks through the forest that would become Hewitt, heading from Stevens Point toward Lake Superior. The railroad established the station Hewitt, named in honor of Henry Hewitt, Sr., a businessperson in the local lumber industry.

In 1877 a group of settlers came to the area from Dodge, Marathon, Calumet and Sheboygan counties. The first settler in town was Frank Cramer, who started a blacksmith shop in 1878. Robert Braasch started a general store business in 1879. A sawmill was added in 1881, and the first school was built. A stave and heading factory was another early industry. In 1882 a wagon shop was added, and in 1883 a hardware store and saloon. A post office was also added in 1883, named Kreuser. After a few years it was renamed Hewitt to match the train station.

About 1883 the Fond du Lac Iron Company (later the Wisconsin Furnace Company) built ten charcoal kilns near the tracks - each holding 32 cords of wood. The kilns converted hardwood bought from local farmers to charcoal that was then shipped by rail to fire the company's smelter at Fond du Lac.

In 1923 the population was 289, with a Catholic church, a Lutheran church, a creamery, a cheese factory, a blacksmith, a garage, several stores, and a Farmers Co-op which handled livestock.

== Geography ==
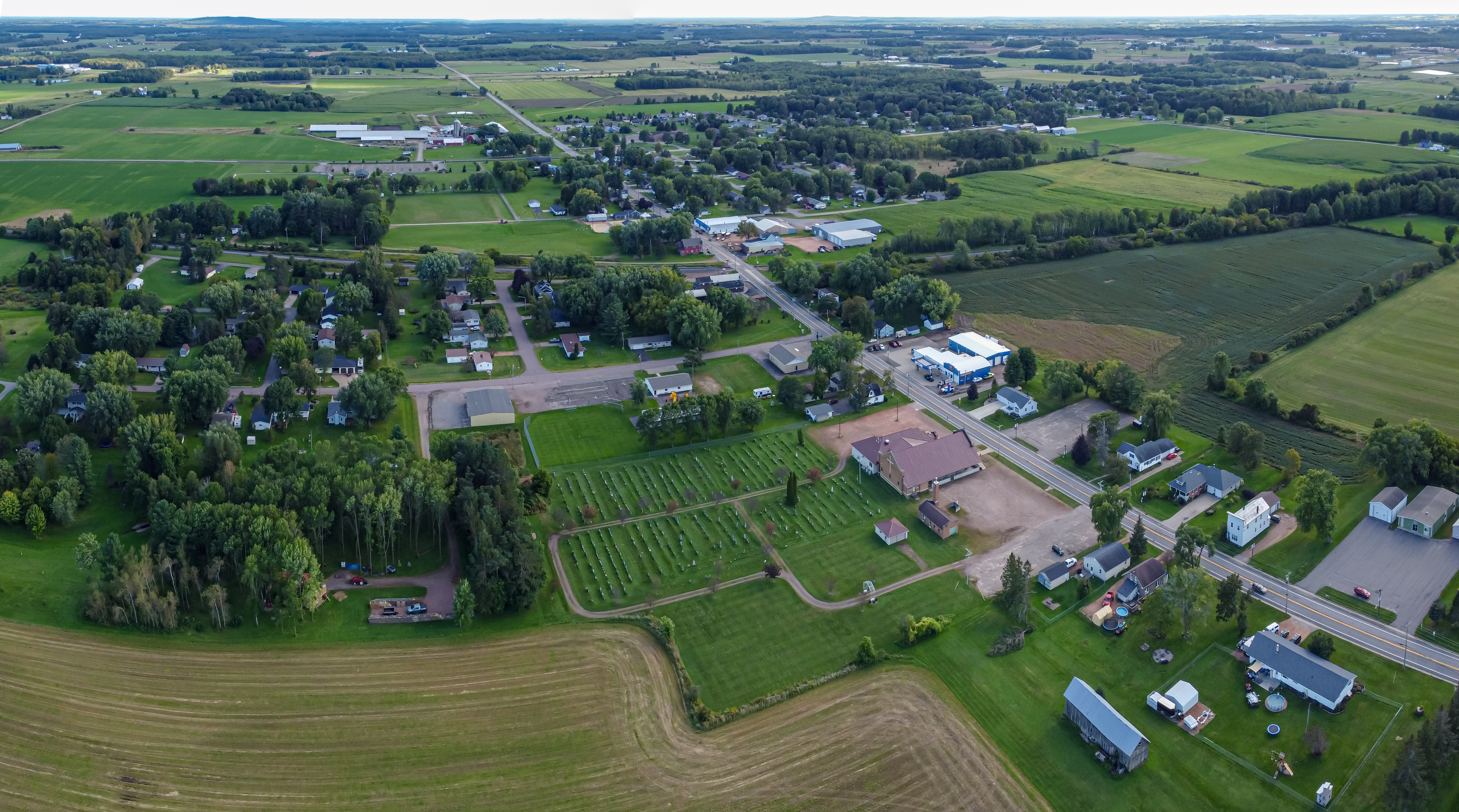

Hewitt is located at 44°38′24″N 90°6′26″W (44.640069, -90.107265).

According to the United States Census Bureau, the village has a total area of 0.95 square miles (2.46 km^{2}), all land.

== Demographics ==
Historical population
Census	Pop.	Note	%±
1980	470		—
1990	595		26.6%
2000	670		12.6%
2010	828		23.6%
2020	796		−3.9%
U.S. Decennial Census

=== 2010 census ===
As of the census of 2010, there were 828 people, 308 households, and 247 families living in the village. The population density was 871.6 inhabitants per square mile (336.5/km^{2}). There were 313 housing units at an average density of 329.5 per square mile (127.2/km^{2}). The racial makeup of the village was 98.6% White, 1.0% Asian, 0.1% from other races, and 0.4% from two or more races. Hispanic or Latino of any race were 1.0% of the population.

There were 308 households, of which 38.3% had children under the age of 18 living with them, 72.1% were married couples living together, 5.8% had a female householder with no husband present, 2.3% had a male householder with no wife present, and 19.8% were non-families. 15.3% of all households were made up of individuals, and 5.2% had someone living alone who was 65 years of age or older. The average household size was 2.69 and the average family size was 3.02.

The median age in the village was 41.1 years. 26.6% of residents were under the age of 18; 6.2% were between the ages of 18 and 24; 22.8% were from 25 to 44; 35.1% were from 45 to 64; and 9.3% were 65 years of age or older. The gender makeup of the village was 49.3% male and 50.7% female.

=== 2000 census ===
As of the census of 2000, there were 670 people, 233 households, and 192 families living in the village. The population density was 830.8 people per square mile (319.4/km^{2}). There were 237 housing units at an average density of 293.9/sq mi (113.0/km^{2}). The racial makeup of the village was 99.70% White and 0.30% Asian. Hispanic or Latino of any race were 0.30% of the population.

There were 233 households, out of which 48.5% had children under the age of 18 living with them, 76.0% were married couples living together, 3.9% had a female householder with no husband present, and 17.2% were non-families. 13.7% of all households were made up of individuals, and 6.4% had someone living alone who was 65 years of age or older. The average household size was 2.88 and the average family size was 3.17.

In the village, the population was spread out, with 31.9% under the age of 18, 4.2% from 18 to 24, 32.5% from 25 to 44, 22.4% from 45 to 64, and 9.0% who were 65 years of age or older. The median age was 36 years. For every 100 females, there were 87.7 males. For every 100 females age 18 and over, there were 91.6 males.

The median income for a household in the village was $53,295, and the median income for a family was $56,875. Males had a median income of $38,625 versus $24,688 for females. The per capita income for the village was $19,234. About 2.0% of families and 2.9% of the population were below the poverty line, including 2.3% of those under age 18 and 8.8% of those age 65 or over.

== Climate ==
The Köppen Climate Classification subtype for this climate is "Dfb". (Warm Summer Continental Climate).

Climate data for Hewitt, Wood County, Wisconsin
Month	Jan	Feb	Mar	Apr	May	Jun	Jul	Aug	Sep	Oct	Nov	Dec	Year
Mean daily maximum °C (°F)	−6 (22)	−2 (28)	4 (39)	13 (56)	21 (69)	25 (77)	28 (82)	26 (79)	21 (70)	14 (58)	5 (41)	−3 (26)	12 (54)
Mean daily minimum °C (°F)	−16 (3)	−14 (7)	−7 (19)	1 (33)	6 (43)	11 (52)	14 (57)	12 (54)	8 (46)	2 (36)	−4 (24)	−13 (9)	0 (32)
Average precipitation mm (inches)	23 (0.9)	23 (0.9)	51 (2)	74 (2.9)	100 (4.1)	100 (4)	100 (4)	100 (4.1)	110 (4.5)	69 (2.7)	53 (2.1)	38 (1.5)	850 (33.6)
Source: Weatherbase

== Notable people ==
- Felix Ley, Roman Catholic bishop, was born in Hewitt, Wisconsin, raised in Marshfield.
