= Gisbert Combaz =

Belgian artist (1869–1941)

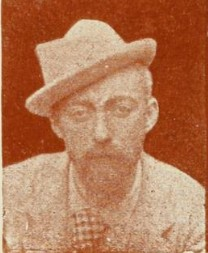
- Born: Gisbert Combaz; 23 September 1869; Antwerp, Belgium
- Died: 18 January 1941 (aged 71); Saint-Gilles, Belgium
- Other name: Ghisbert Combaz
- Movement: Art Nouveau, Cloisonnism, Pointillism
- Spouse: Marthe Verhas (m. 1895)
- Children: 3, including Jean Combaz

Gisbert Combaz, or Ghisbert Combaz (23 September 1869 – 18 January 1941), was a Belgian painter, lithographer, illustrator, poster artist, furniture designer, sculptor, art educator, art historian and lawyer. He originally trained and practised as a lawyer, but gave up his legal career to dedicate himself to art education and art. He was one of the leading Belgian Art Nouveau artists. Despite his talents as a painter, he is now mainly known for his poster designs and postcards as well as his First World War drawings expressing his hatred for the German occupiers. His work showed a strong influence of his in-depth study of Japanese and Chinese art.

== Life ==
Gisbert Combaz was born in Antwerp as the son of engineering major Paul Combaz and Marie-Amélie Vanden Eynde. His father was an active member of the Société royale d'archéologie de Bruxelles and after retiring as a major, a professor of construction at the Académie Royale des Beaux-Arts in Brussels. Gisbert studied law at the Université libre de Bruxelles from which he graduated in 1891 with the title of doctor of laws. He practised for a while as a lawyer at the Brussels bar. He gave up his legal career in 1893 to devote himself to art. Before leaving Brussels to seek a teaching position to fund his new career as an artist, he studied briefly at the Académie Royale des Beaux-Arts in Brussels. He found his first teaching position at the Institute Agricole in Gembloux. Here he worked from 1895 to 1900 as a teacher of drawing for pupils who studied engineering, chemistry and agriculture.

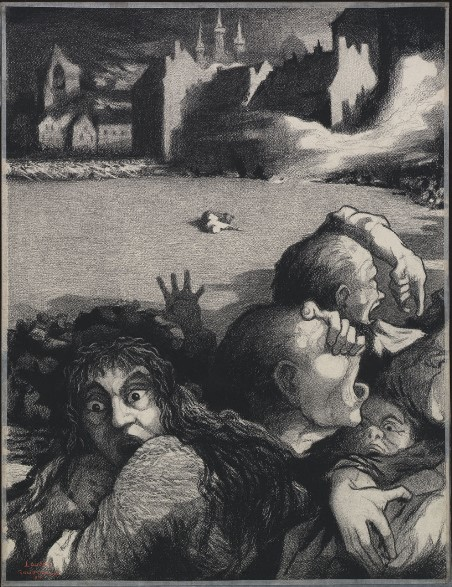
Louvain, 1916, drawing of the citizens of Louvain fleeing their city set ablaze by German soldiers during WW I.

On 16 April 1895, Gisbert Combaz married Marthe Verhas, a daughter of the prominent Realist painter Jan Verhas. From this union were born three children, the architect Jean Combaz born in 1896, Suzanne in 1897 and Denise in 1903.

From 1898 to 1940, he taught decorative arts at the École des arts industriels et décoratifs (School of Industrial and Decorative Arts) of Ixelles. He was appointed professor of art history at the Université Nouvelle (New University, later renamed 'Institut des Hautes Études de Belgique' (Institute of High Studies of Belgium)) in 1905 where he replaced Paul Janson as member of the Steering Committee. On 1 October 1912 he was appointed professor of ornamental composition at the Académie Royale des Beaux-Arts of Brussels. One of his students was René Magritte.

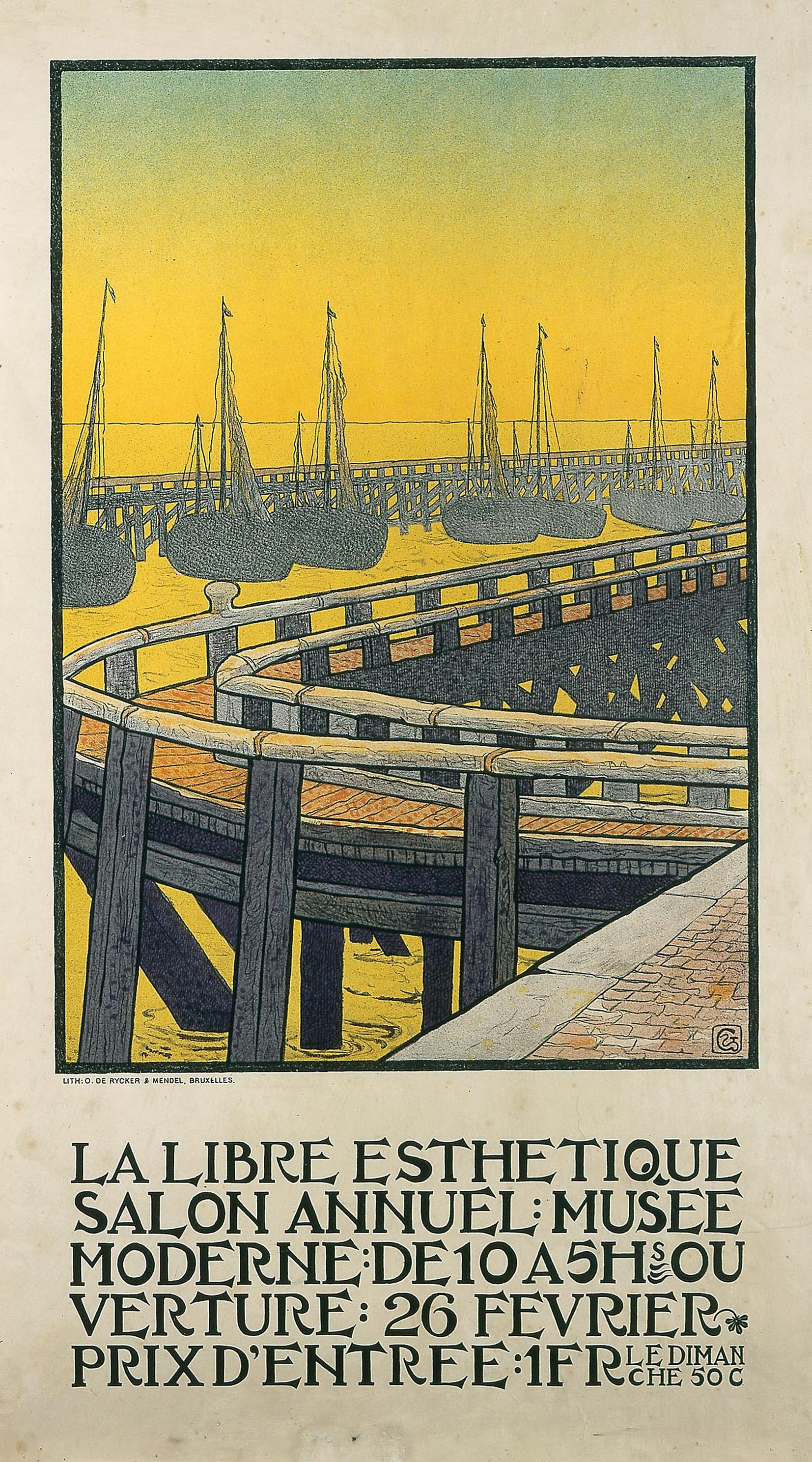
Poster for the annual salon of La Libre Esthétique

During World War I, he created a number of artworks that fiercely criticized the German occupiers and the war in stark images. He did so in line with other Belgian artists such as Franz Masereel, Louis Raemaekers and Henri de Groux. These works contrast sharply with his other output. This remained a brief interlude in his career and he returned to his more decorative works after the war.

He was influenced by the work of the Belgian artistic and literary group known as Les XX, one of Europe's most prominent avant-garde circles and a catalyst for the development of Symbolism and Art Nouveau. Combaz exhibited with the group's successor, La Libre Esthétique starting from 1897 and designed many of the exhibition posters of the group. He also participated in group exhibitions of L'Estampe, an artists' association founded at the end of 1906 in Brussels. It brought together graphic artists with the intention of promoting the print medium through exhibitions. Its members included Fernand Khnopff, Auguste Danse, Richard Heinz, Auguste Oleffe, Henry De Groux, Marie Danse, Louise Danse, Georges Lemmen, Richard Baseleer, Willy Finch, Victor Mignot, Gustave-Max Stevens en Henri Meunier. Combaz never did a solo show during his career, and only one brief article about his work was published during his lifetime.

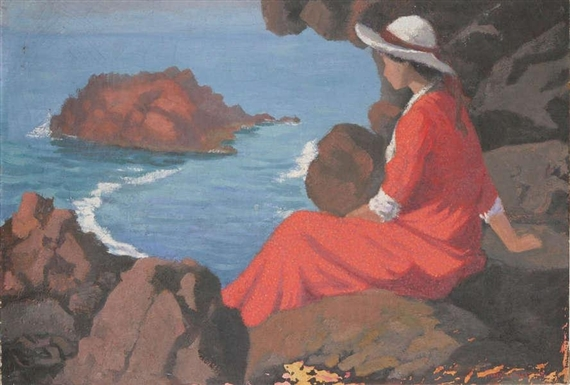
Among the rocks

From the late 19th century he gradually developed an interest in the art of the Far East, which he studied avidly. Combaz was first introduced to Oriental art by the Belgian Indologist and scholar of Buddhist Studies Louis de La Vallée-Poussin. Louis de La Vallée-Poussin introduced him to the members of the Société asiatique de Paris who formed the elite of Oriental studies in France such as Sylvain Lévi, Paul Pelliot, Joseph Hackin, Jeanine Auboyer and René Grousset.

When in 1929 the Institut belge des hautes études chinoises ('Belgian Institute of Advanced Chinese Studies') was founded in Brussels, the founders asked Combaz for his collaboration. He published several scholarly works in the Institut's publication Mélanges de l'Institut and gave lectures. He was among the first member of the Société belge d'Études orientales (Belgian Society of Oriental Studies, now the Société Royale Belge d'Études Orientales) founded in Brussels in 1921, of which he was the president in 1934. The stated aim of the Société was to overcome the shortcomings of official education in Orientalism. He also built a significant collection or Oriental artifacts including Chinese and Japanese ceramics. This inspired him to experiment with creating artisanal pottery at home.

The artist died in Brussels not long after the start of the Second World War.

== Work ==
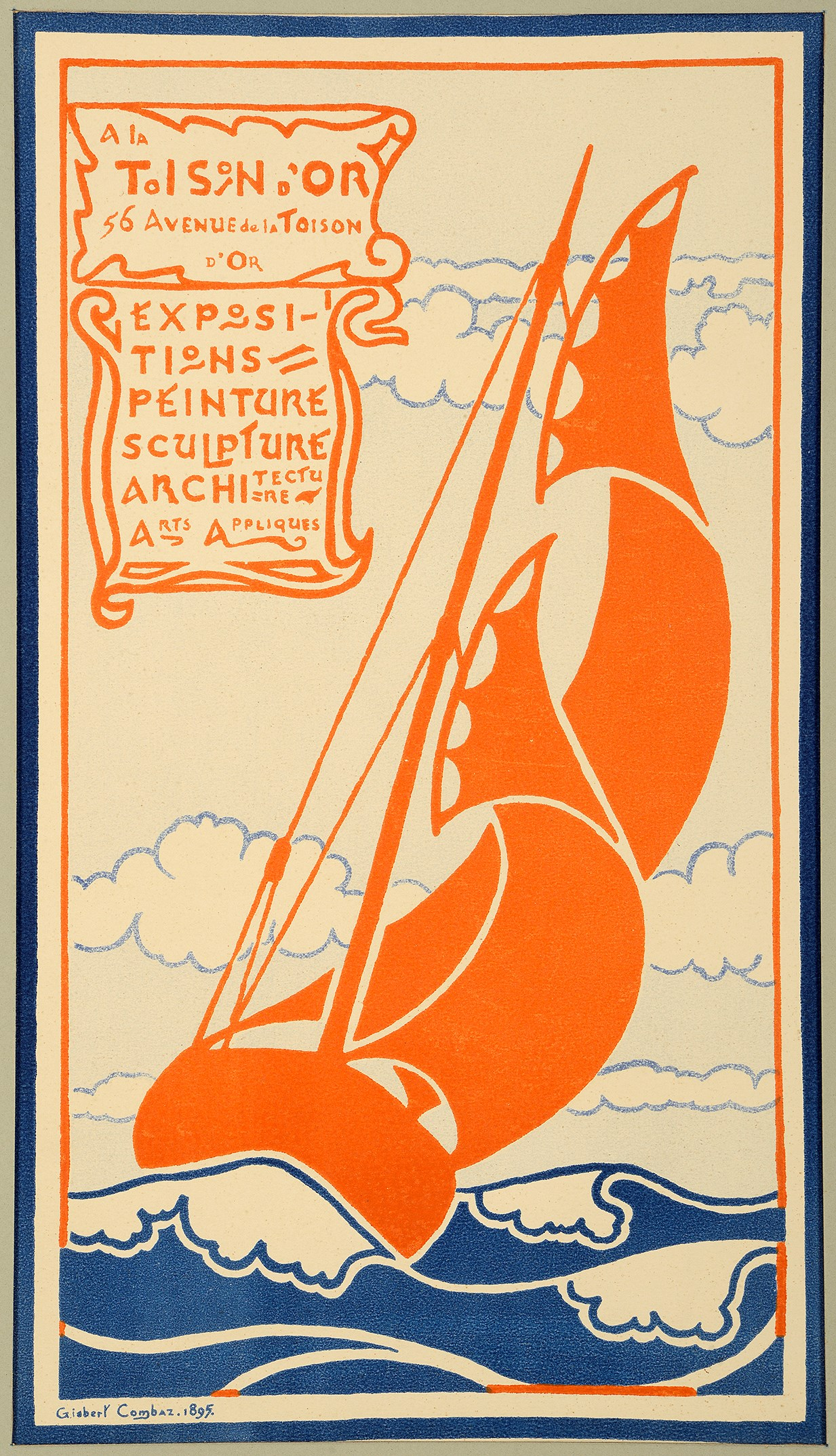
Poster for the 1895 Expositions Peinture, Sculpture, Architecture, Arts Appliqués at La Maison d’art, Brussels

Gisbert Combaz was a versatile personality who combined a variety of artistic pursuits with scholarly studies and academic education. He is mainly known for poster design and postcards and was active as a lithographer, illustrator, furniture designers and potter. He was talented painter whose works show the inspiration of Maurice Denis who also directed him towards religious subjects. His paintings have a decorative character and a great tenderness of tone. He was one of the principal protagonists of the Art Nouveau movement in Belgium.

He was a prolific designer of posters. At the end of the 19th century, the poster was a successful new medium that reflected the aspirations of the bourgeoisie. Aside from encouraging consumption, it evoked moments of pleasure and lightness that were part of the leisure and entertainment of the affluent and influential population. He designed many posters for exhibitions of the artist circle La Libre Esthétique. He developed a personal style which remains very recognizable. It is inspired by calligraphy and Japanese prints. The iconographic repertoire of Japanese artists such as Hokusai and Hiroshige were an inspiration for his compositions. The reference work was clearly the Hokusai Manga, published in 1815 and composed of 15 volumes. From 1897 Combaz designs different posters for the annual exhibitions of the artistic group La Libre Esthétique. Characteristic of his posters is there use of a central theme, such as a boat, a tree, a peacock or an eagle. In addition, his posters are also characterized by a very bright color palette. Combaz mixes the Japanese print style with Art Nouveau elements such an arabesques. Through these posters Combaz gave the Art Nouveau a very powerful and modern form.

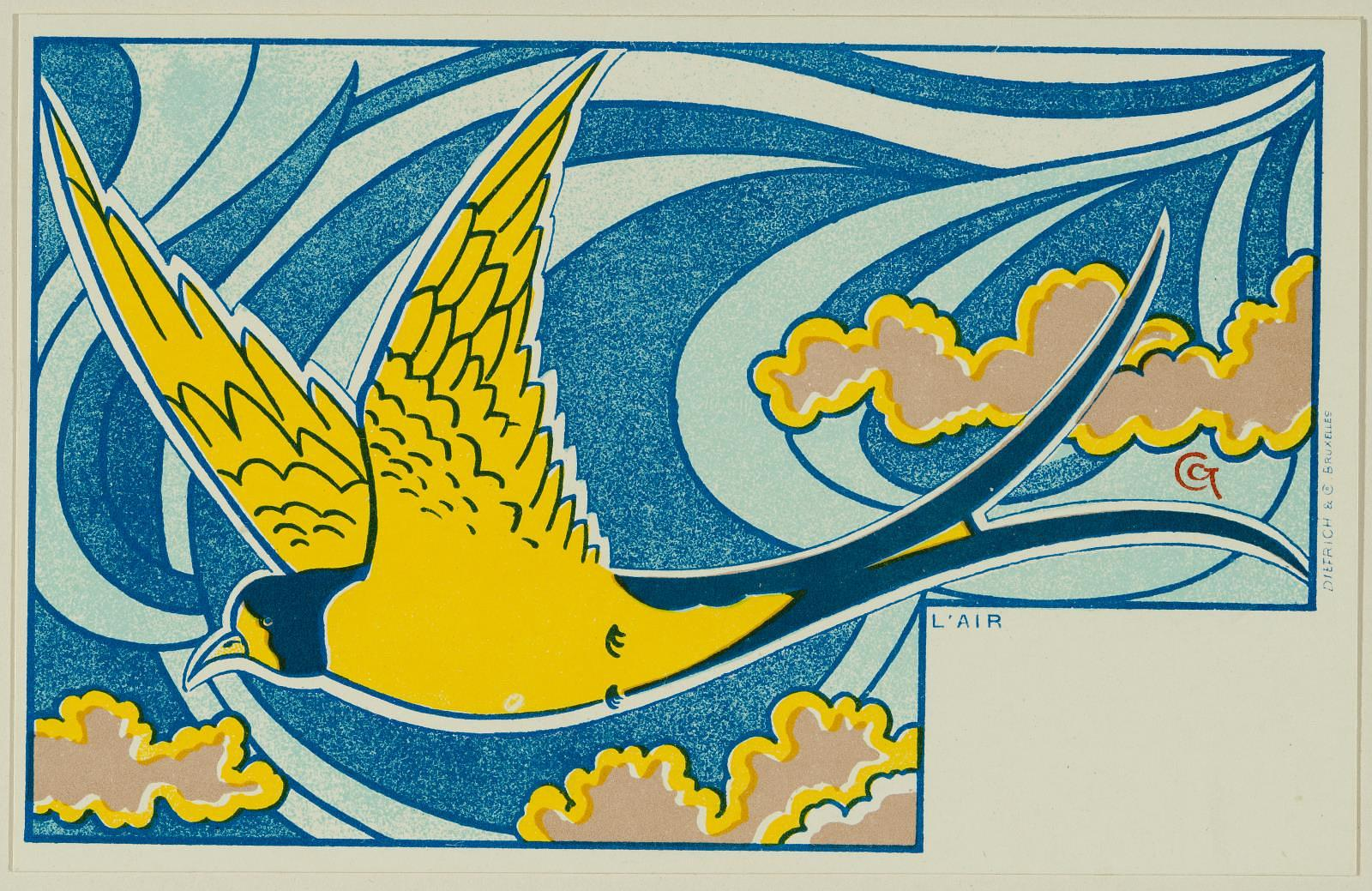
Postcard representing the Element Air

Combaz was very effective in transposing the Japanese wood block print style known as ukiyo-e to the medium of posters. In his Poster for the 1895 Expositions Peinture, Sculpture, Architecture, Arts Appliques at La Maison d’art, Brussels, Combaz succeeded like the Japanese masters to express the maximum with a minimum of resources. With the motif of the sailboat treated in a single flat color, his poster gains a great expressiveness equal to that of Japanese prints. Combaz wrote in the journal L'Art moderne that the quality of the Japanese landscapes is their chromatic unity: in each print there is a dominant palette which, by simplifying the impression, makes it strong and confers to these pictures a character of powerful homogeneity. These characteristics were clearly transposed by Combaz to his posters.

Combaz' work further shows the influence of contemporary movements such as cloisonnism and pointillism. His early lithographs are based on a few flat decorative shapes. He then developed towards a cloisonne style of patterned images - birds, figures, land and seascapes - enclosed by a thick dark line. After 1906 he blended cloisonnism and pointillism as shown in some gouaches of oversized flowers in particular of orchids.

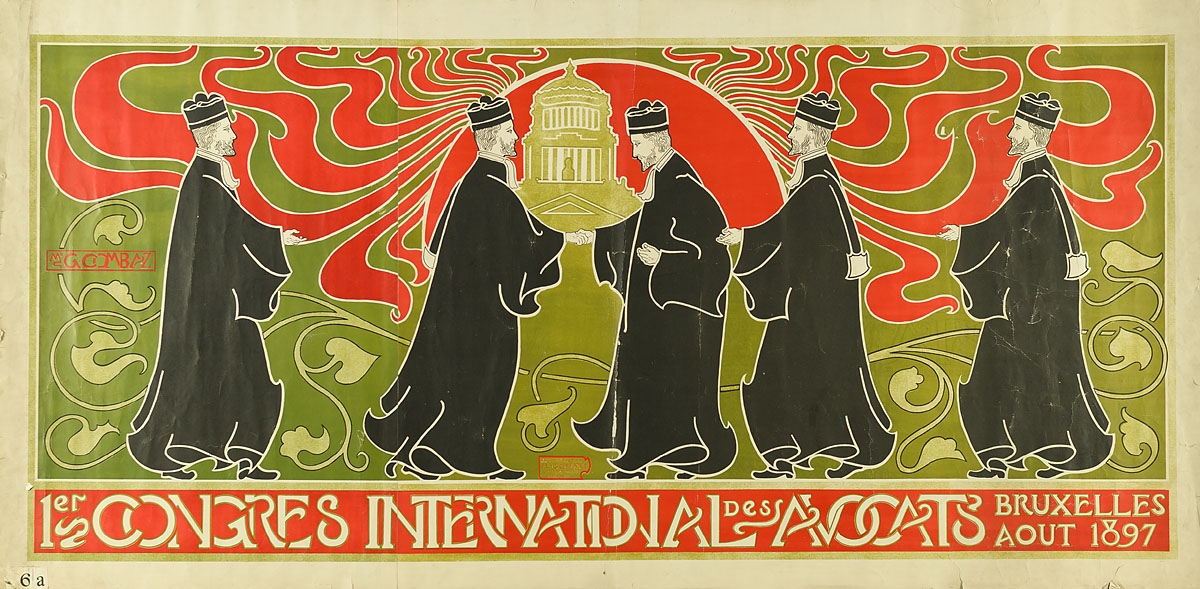
Poster for the First International Congress of Lawyers in Brussels in August 1897

Combaz further designed book covers and postcards. Particularly well known are his postcards with designs of the four elements, scenes of the ocean and fishermen, expressions and proverbs. He further created a number of drawings that expressed the horror of the Belgians at the atrocities committed by the German occupiers during the First World War. One of his drawings called Louvain shows the terror of the citizens of Louvain at the burning down of their town by German soldiers on 25 August 1914. Combaz depicted in very graphic detail the horrified people fleeing the town with flames visible in the background of the drawing.

He also tried his hand at sculpture and exhibited sculptures of a lion and a peacock at the Triannual Salon of Brussels in 1919.

== Publications ==
In the 1930s, along with René Grousset, Henri Maspero and Paul Pelliot, he published a number of publications on oriental art. He wrote among other things, several articles for the Annals of the Brussels Archeological Society.

=== Selected publications ===
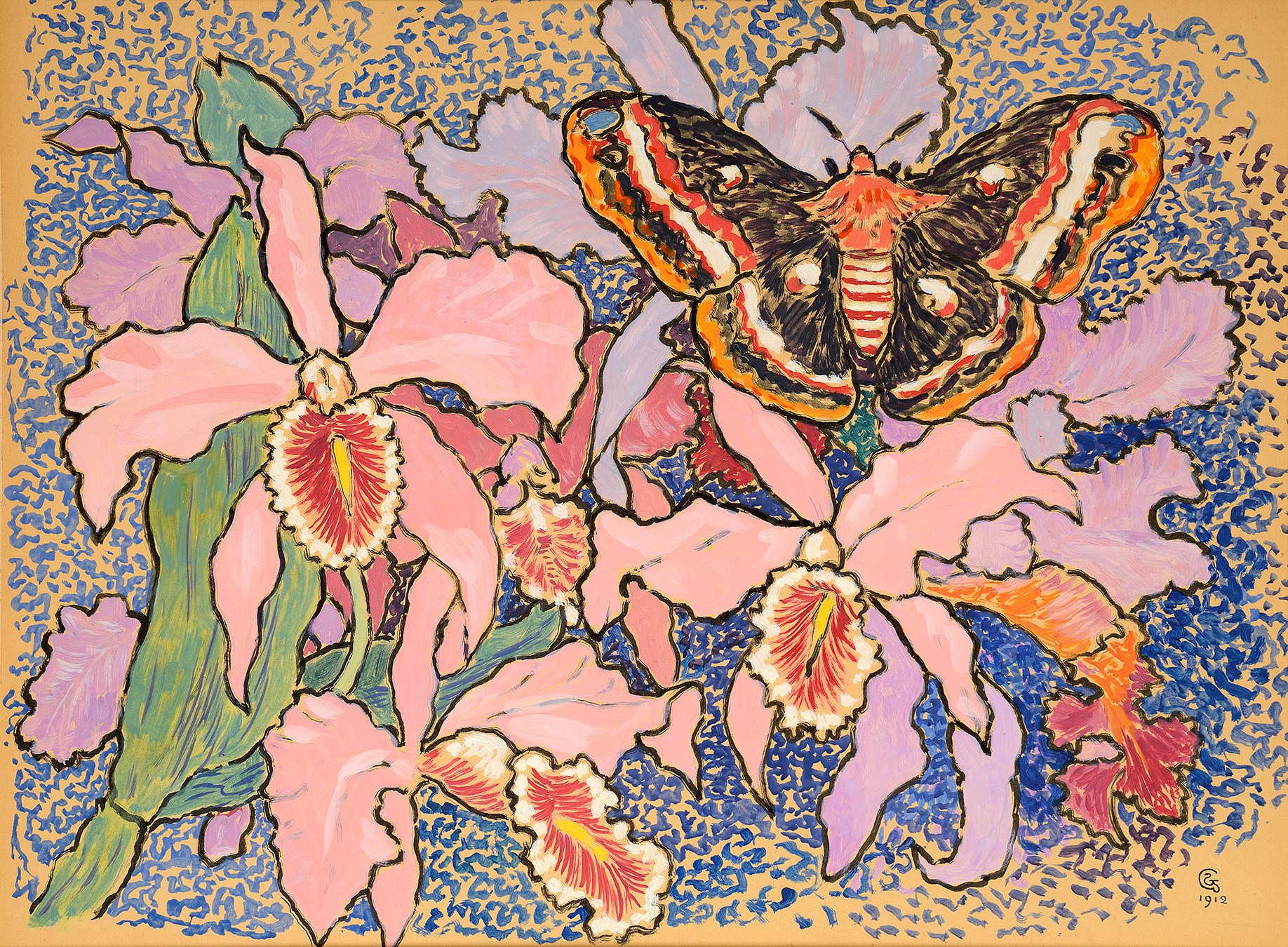
Orchids and an Emperor Moth

- Les Sépultures impériales de la Chine, Brussels, Vromant, 1907
- Les Palais impériaux de la Chine, Brussels, Vromant, 1909
- Les Temples impériaux de la Chine, Brussels, Vromant, 1912
- "Évolution du Stùpa en Asie", in Mélanges chinois et bouddhiques, vol. II, Brussels, 1932–1933, pp. 163–305, vol. III, 1934–1935, pp. 93–144, vol. IV, 1935–1936, pp. 1–125
- L'Inde et l'Orient classique, 2 vols., Documents d'Art et d'Archéologie, Musée Guimet, Paris, 1937
- "Masques et Dragons en Asie", in Mélanges chinois et bouddhiques, vol. VII, 1939–1945
- La peinture chinoise vue par un peintre occidental, Introduction à l'histoire de la peinture chinoise, Extrait des Mélanges chinois et bouddhiques, publiés par L'Institut belge des Hautes Études Chinoises, vol. VI. Imprimerie Sainte Catherine, Bruges, 1939
