= Francis Xavier Kaname Shimamoto =

20th-century Japanese Catholic bishop

フランシスコ・ザビエル 島本 要 Francisco Xavier Kaname Shimamoto
- Archbishop of Nagasaki
- Church: Catholic Church
- Archdiocese: Nagasaki
- Installed: May 8, 1990
- Term ended: August 31, 2002 (died)
- Predecessor: Joseph Asjiro Satowaki
- Successor: Joseph Mitsuaki Takami
- Other post: Catholic Bishop Urawa (1980 - 1990)

Orders
- Ordination: November 23, 1958
- Consecration: March 20, 1980

Personal details
- Born: February 14, 1932 (Japan) Minami-Matsuura District, Nagasaki, Nagasaki Prefecture
- Died: August 31, 2002 (aged 70) (Japan) Nagasaki

Francis Xavier Kaname Shimamoto (February 14, 1932 - August 31, 2002) was a Japanese bishop of the Catholic Church. His baptismal name was "Francis Xavier". Shimamoto was ordained a Catholic priest on 23 November 1958. In 1979 he was appointed Bishop of the Roman Catholic Diocese of Urawa and consecrated on 20 March 1980. He was a church spokesman during Pope John Paul II's visit to Japan in 1980. In 1990 Pope John Paul II appointed Shimamoto Archbishop of the Roman Catholic Archdiocese of Nagasaki. On 31 August 2002 Shimamoto died.
