= Diocese of Kagoshima =

Roman Catholic diocese in Japan

Coordinates: 31°35′30″N 130°33′02″E

Diocese of Kagoshima Dioecesis Kagoshimaensis カトリック鹿児島教区
- St. Francis Xavier Cathedral

Location
- Country: Japan
- Territory: Kagoshima
- Ecclesiastical province: Nagasaki 長崎
- Metropolitan: Nagasaki 長崎

Statistics
- Area: 9,187 km^{2} (3,547 sq mi)
- Population: Total; Catholics: (as of 2011); 1,698,500; 9,281 (0.5%)

Information
- Rite: Latin Rite
- Cathedral: St Francis Xavier Cathedral in Kagoshima

Current leadership
- Pope: Leo XIV
- Bishop: Francis Xavier Hiroaki Nakano
- Metropolitan Archbishop: Peter Michiaki Nakamura
- Bishops emeritus: Paul Kenjiro Koriyama Bishop Emeritus (2005-2018)

Map
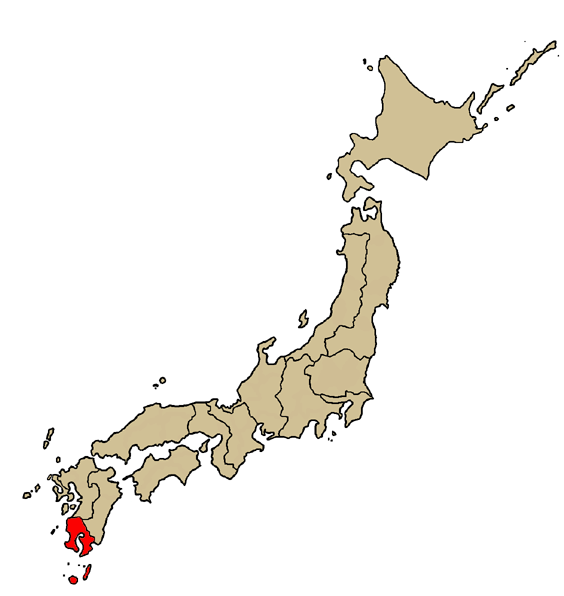

Website
- Website of the Diocese

The Diocese of Kagoshima (Latin: Dioecesis Kagoshimaensis, Japanese: カトリック鹿児島教区) is a Latin Church diocese of the Catholic Church in the ecclesiastical province of the Metropolitan Archbishop of Nagasaki 長崎, in southern Japan.

Its episcopal see is the Cathedral of St. Francis Xavier (Xavier Church), in the city of Kagoshima.

== History ==
- Established on March 18, 1927, as Apostolic Prefecture of Kagoshima, an exempt missionary pre-diocesan jurisdiction, on territory split off from the then Diocese of Nagasaki (now its Metropolitan)
- On 27 March 1927 it lost territory to establish the Mission sui juris of Miyazaki 宮崎
- In 1947 it lost territory (the Ryukyu Islands) to establish the Apostolic Administration of Okinawa and the Southern Islands 琉球列島
- Promoted on February 25, 1955, as Diocese of Kagoshima, hence no longer directly subject to the Holy See

== Ordinaries ==
(all Roman Rite)

Apostolic Prefects of Kagoshima

- Egide Marie Roy (エジド・ロア), Friars Minor (O.F.M.) (1929.05.11 – death 1936)
- Francis Xavier Ichitaro Ideguchi (フランシスコ出口一太郎) (1940.06.10 – death 1955), previously Apostolic Administrator of Apostolic Prefecture of Miyazaki 宮崎 (Japan) (1940 – 1945.11.18)

Suffragan Bishops of Kagoshima

- ? Paul Aijirô Yamaguchi † (9 November 1936 - 15 September 1937)
- Joseph Asjiro Satowaki † (25 February 1955 - 19 December 1968), later Metropolitan Archbishop of Nagasaki 長崎 (Japan) (1968.12.19 – 1990.02.08), President of Catholic Bishops’ Conference of Japan (1978 – 1983), created Cardinal-Priest of S. Maria della Pace (1979.06.30 – death 1996.08.08)
- Paul Shinichi Itonaga (15 November 1969 - 3 December 2005)
- Paul Kenjiro Koriyama (3 December 2005 - 7 July 2018)
- Francis Xavier Hiroaki Nakano (7 July 2018 – Present)

== See also ==
- Roman Catholicism in Japan

== Sources and external links ==
- GCatholic.org with incumbent biography links
- Catholic Hierarchy

== Other External links ==
- Diocese website (Japanese)
- Diocese at the website of the Catholic Bishops' Conference of Japan (Japanese)
