= Albert Breton =

Albert Henri Charles Breton M.E.P.
- Bishop of Fukuoka
- Church: Catholic Church
- Diocese: Diocese of Fukuoka
- In office: 9 June 1931 – 21 May 1941
- Predecessor: Fernand-Jean-Joseph Thiry
- Successor: Dominic Senyemon Fukahori
- Other post: Titular Bishop of Arabissus (1941-1954)

Orders
- Ordination: 29 June 1905
- Consecration: 29 September 1931 by Jean-Baptiste-Alexis Chambon

Personal details
- Born: 16 July 1882 Saint-Inglevert, Pas-de-Calais, France
- Died: 12 August 1954 (aged 72) Kamakura, Kanagawa Prefecture, Japan

Albert Henri Charles Breton (16 July 1882 – 12 August 1954), born in Saint-Inglevert, was a French clergyman and bishop for the Roman Catholic Diocese of Fukuoka. He was ordained in 1905 and became a priest at La Société des Missions Etrangères, starting his career as a missionary in Japan that year. He was first stationed at Hakodate for five years. In 1910, he was a parish priest at Aomori when the church and his residence was destroyed by a fire and needed to be rebuilt. He contracted poliomyelitis mid-year and returned to France where he received medical care until 1912. He collaborated with Roman Catholics in the United States and Canada until 1921.

From 1921 to 1931, Breton was assigned to Tokyo. He trained nuns acquired from the United States and operated kindergarten, orphanage, and hospice foundations. He was appointed bishop at Fukuoka and ordained a bishop in 1931. He resigned in January 1941, when the missionary was operated by the Priests of Saint Sulpice of Canada.

Breton was appointed titular bishop of Arabissus on 12 May 1941. He was a missionary in Tokyo from 1942 to 1952, during which he expanded mission posts, opened more schools for children, and built new churches. On 8 December 1941 (the day after the Japanese attack on Pearl Harbor), he was arrested by the Japanese police. He was detained until 8 April 1942. On 29 September 1949, he was awarded the Legion of Honour.

Breton died in 1954 and was buried in Yokosuko (Yokosuka), Japan.
