= Joseph Asajiro Satowaki =

Japanese Catholic Cardinal (1904–1996)

His Eminence Joseph Asajirô Satowaki
- Cardinal, Archbishop of Nagasaki
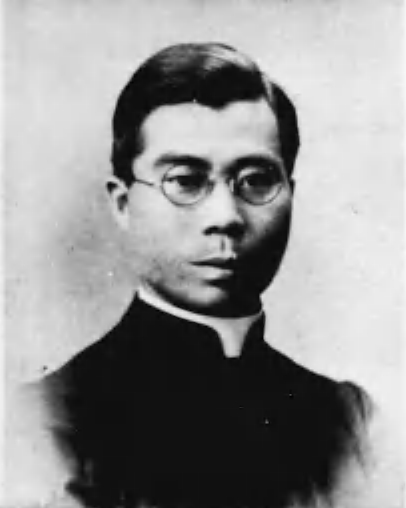
- Satowaki as a priest, ca. 1942
- See: Nagasaki
- Installed: December 19, 1968
- Term ended: February 8, 1990
- Predecessor: Paul Aijirô Yamaguchi
- Successor: Francis Xavier Kaname Shimamoto
- Other post: Bishop of Kagoshima (1955-1968)

Orders
- Ordination: December 17, 1932
- Consecration: May 3, 1955
- Created cardinal: June 30, 1979 by Pope John Paul II

Personal details
- Born: February 1, 1904 Shittsu, Kyūshū, Japan
- Died: August 8, 1996 (aged 92) Nagasaki, Kyūshū, Japan
- Motto: Lætentur insulæ multæ (Latin for 'Let the many islands rejoice')

Styles of Joseph Asajiro Satowaki
- Reference style: His Eminence
- Spoken style: Your Eminence
- Informal style: Cardinal
- See: Nagasaki

Joseph Asajirô Satowaki (里脇 浅次郎 Satowaki Asajirō; February 1, 1904 – August 8, 1996) was a Japanese Catholic prelate who served as Archbishop of Nagasaki from 1968 to 1990, and was elevated to the cardinalate in 1979.

As a seminarian in Rome, Satowaki is also remembered for inviting Maximilian Kolbe to Japan as a missionary.

== Early life ==
Satowaki Asajirō was born in Shitsu, and studied at the seminary of Nagasaki, Pontifical Urbaniana University in Rome, and Catholic University of America in Washington, D.C. As a seminarian in Rome, he invited the Polish Conventual Franciscan friar and future saint Maximilian Kolbe to come to Japan as a missionary. Ordained to the priesthood on December 17, 1932, Satowaki did pastoral work in the Diocese of Nagasaki and served as procurator and episcopal chancellor. He was Apostolic administrator of Taiwan from 1941 to 1945, and rector of the seminary of Nagasaki from 1945 to 1947. Between 1945 and 1955, he served as vicar general, editor of the diocesan newspaper, and a teacher at the Junshin School.

== Archbishop ==
On February 25, 1955, Satowaki was appointed Bishop of Kagoshima by Pope Pius XII. He received his episcopal consecration on the following May 3 from Archbishop Maximilien de Furstenberg, with Bishops Paul Aijirô Yamaguchi and Paul Yoshigoro Taguchi serving as co-consecrators, at the church of Our Lady of the Martyrs in Nagasaki. He attended the Second Vatican Council from 1962 to 1965. He was promoted to Archbishop of Nagasaki on December 19, 1968. He also served as President of the Catholic Bishops' Conference of Japan.

Pope John Paul II created him Cardinal Priest of Santa Maria della Pace in the consistory of June 30, 1979. He was the third cardinal from Japan. After a 21-year-long tenure, he resigned as Archbishop on February 8, 1990.

Satowaki died in Nagasaki, aged 92. He is buried in the cemetery of Akagi.

Catholic Church titles
Preceded by Francis Xavier Ichitaro Ideguchi	Bishop of Kagoshima; 1955—1968	Succeeded by Paul Shinichi Itonaga
Preceded by Paul Aijirô Yamaguchi	Archbishop of Nagasaki; 1968—1990	Succeeded by Francis Xavier Kaname Shimamoto
Preceded by Thonas de la Hoz	Apostolic Prefect of Formosa; 1941—1946	Succeeded by Joseph (José) Arregui y Yparaguirre as Apostolic Prefect of Kaohsiung
Preceded by Maurice Feltin	Cardinal-Priest of Santa Maria della Pace; 1979–1996	Succeeded by Francisco Javier Errázuriz Ossa
