= Fernand-Jean-Joseph Thiry =

French missionary, bishop

Fernand-Jean-Joseph Thiry M.E.P.
- Bishop of Fukuoka
- Church: Catholic Church
- Diocese: Diocese of Fukuoka
- In office: 14 July 1927 – 10 May 1930
- Predecessor: Diocese erected
- Successor: Albert Breton

Orders
- Ordination: 29 June 1907
- Consecration: 11 December 1927 by Mario Giardini

Personal details
- Born: 28 September 1884 Anor, Nord, France
- Died: 10 May 1930 (aged 45)

Fernand-Jean-Joseph Thiry (born 28 September 1884 in Anor – died 10 May 1930) was a French clergyman and bishop for the Roman Catholic Diocese of Fukuoka. He was ordained in 1927. He was appointed in 1927. He died in 1930.

== Biography ==
Fernand-Jean-Joseph Thiry was born in Anor on 28 September 1884 in the Nord department into a family of farmers. He joined the Paris Foreign Missions Society and was ordained a priest on 29 June 1907, and departed on 13 August of the same year for Nagasaki. In 1922, he worked to develop the novitiate of the Sisters of the Child Jesus of Chauffailles.

Combaz having died on 18 August 1926, Father Thiry was appointed superior of the mission. Pope Pope Pius XI appointed him the first bishop of Fukuoka on 14 July 1927. He was consecrated on 11 December of the same year by Mario Giardini, Apostolic Delegate to Japan. During his episcopate, he established the administration of the new diocese, took an interest in the first indigenous vocations, and helped establish new religious institutes, such as the Visitation Sisters of Japan, the first native religious congregation in the country, which he approved in 1929. He died on 10 May 1930.
