= Luis de Cerqueira =

Portuguese Catholic bishop (1552–1614)

Luis de Cerqueira SJ (1552 – February 20, 1614) was a Portuguese Jesuit priest and missionary. He played a role in spreading Christianity in Japan during the early 17th century as the bishop of the diocese which included Nagasaki.

== Early life ==
Cerqueira was born in Alvito, Portugal and joined the Society of Jesus at the age of 14. He was ordained as a priest. From around 1575 to 1577 he served in the Secretariat of the Jesuit General in Rome. He returned to Portugal in 1585, as professor of theology at the University of Coimbra 1585–1586. From 1586 to 1589 he worked for the Provincial of Portugal, again as a professor of theology at the Jesuit University of Évora. He was consecrated as the titular bishop of Tiberias in 1594.

== Bishop in Japan ==
In January 1592, he was appointed as coadjutor bishop in the diocese of Funai in Japan, which had been established in 1588, but did not receive a papal bull until 1594. While waiting, he received his doctorate in theology in November 1593. On March 30, 1594, Cerqueira left for Asia, reaching the Portuguese colony of Goa on September 22, and arriving in Macao on August 7.

While still in Macao, he was appointed Bishop of Funai in Japan in February 1598 after the death of Pedro Martínez. Despite the unwelcoming situation in Japan, where 26 martyrs in Nagasaki died in 1597, by 1598 Christian persecution in Japan had subsided, and he arrived in Japan in July–August 1598, accompanied by Visitor Alessandro Valignano and other Jesuit missionaries.

Cerquiera's episcopate coincided with the peak of the early Japanese Catholic Church. Conversions were numerous, and despite a growing hostility from the shogunate, the Church existed in relative freedom, ordaining Japanese priests, establishing Christian communities and welcoming new missionaries.

He observed Japanese slave women being sold to foreign sailors, and expressed the scandalousness of this in a 1598 report.

During Cerqueira's time in Japan conflict emerged between Jesuits and the mendicant orders, particularly Franciscans. This dispute centered around the desire of the Franciscans to proselytize in Nagasaki, while the Jesuits sought exclusive access to the region for their missionary activities. As bishop, Cerqueira issued orders expelling Franciscans and prohibiting them from administering sacraments. However, over time, the contentious issue began to subside. A papal bull was issued, granting permission for all religious orders, including the Franciscans, to engage in preaching and missionary work. The Franciscans invited Cerqueira to officiate at a mass. Cerqueira's charismatic leadership has been recognized as maintaining peace.

Cerqueira died in Nagasaki on February 16, 1614. After his death, the conflict between the Jesuits and mendicant orders arose again, since Cerqueira was no longer keeping the peace. Since he died in February 1614, he was spared the expulsion of all foreign missionaries by the edict of the Tokugawa shogunate later that year.
