= Uematsu =

Uematsu (written: 植松) is a Japanese surname. Notable people with the name include:

- Daihachirō Uematsu (born 1946/47), Japan Self-Defense Forces general and kendo teacher in Finland
- Emiko Uematsu (植松 恵美子, born 1967), Japanese politician
- Hitoshi Uematsu (植松 仁, born 1974), Japanese speed skater
- Jun Uematsu (植松 純, born 1972), Japanese speed skater
- Kenji Uematsu (born 1976), Spanish judoka
- Kiyoshi Uematsu (born 1978), Spanish judoka
- Nathaniel Makoto Uematsu (植松 誠 ナタナエル, born 1952), Japanese Anglican bishop and Primate of the Nippon Sei Ko Kai
- Nobuo Uematsu (植松 伸夫, born 1959), Japanese composer and keyboardist
- Satoshi Uematsu (植松 聖, born 1990), perpetrator of the Sagamihara stabbings
- Taira Uematsu (born 1983), Japanese baseball coach
- Tadao Uematsu (born 1967), Japanese racecar driver
- Toshie Uematsu (植松 寿絵, born 1974), Japanese female professional wrestler

== Fictional characters ==
- Koboshi Uematsu (植松 小星), a character in the manga series Pita-Ten

== See also ==
- Amy Uyematsu (1947–2023), Japanese-American poet
