= Diocese of Fukuoka =

Latin Catholic diocese in Japan

Diocese of Fukuoka Dioecesis Fukuokaensis カトリック福岡教区
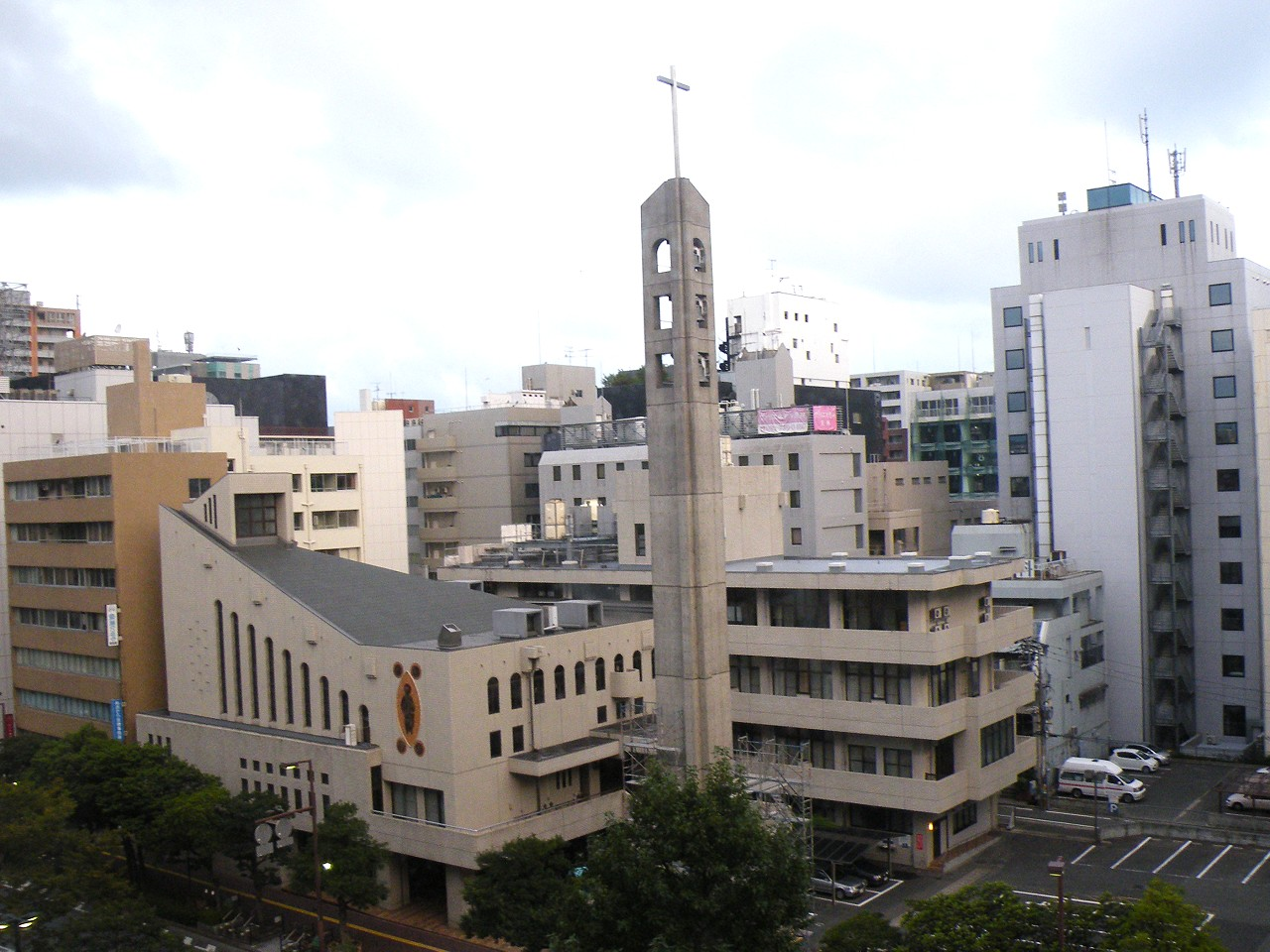
- Cathedral of the Diocese

Location
- Country: Japan
- Territory: Fukuoka, Saga, and Kumamoto
- Ecclesiastical province: Nagasaki
- Metropolitan: Nagasaki
- Coordinates: 33°35′N 130°24′E

Statistics
- Area: 14,808 km^{2} (5,717 sq mi)
- Population: Total; Catholics: (as of 2006); 7,754,937; 31,289 (0.4%)

Information
- Denomination: Catholic Church
- Sui iuris church: Latin Church
- Rite: Roman Rite
- Established: 16 July 1927
- Cathedral: Cathedral of Our Lady of Victory in Fukuoka

Current leadership
- Pope: Leo XIV
- Bishop: Josep Maria Abella Batlle
- Metropolitan Archbishop: Peter Michiaki Nakamura
- Bishops emeritus: Dominic Ryōji Miyahara

Map
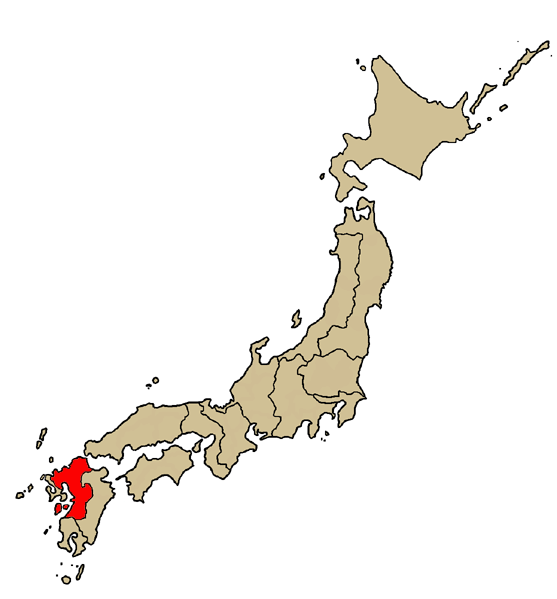

Website
- Website of the Diocese

The Diocese of Fukuoka (Latin: Dioecesis Fukuokaensis, Japanese: カトリック福岡教区) is a Latin Catholic diocese of the Catholic Church located in Fukuoka in the Ecclesiastical Province of Nagasaki in Japan.

== History ==
- July 16, 1927: Established as Diocese of Fukuoka from the Diocese of Nagasaki

== Ordinaries ==
- Fernand-Jean-Joseph Thiry, M.E.P. † (14 Jul 1927 Appointed – 10 May 1930 Died)
- Albert Henri Charles Breton, M.E.P. † (9 Jun 1931 Appointed – 16 Jan 1941 Resigned)
- Dominic Senyemon Fukahori † (9 Mar 1944 Appointed – 15 Nov 1969 Retired)
- Peter Saburo Hirata, P.S.S. † (15 Nov 1969 Appointed – 6 Oct 1990 Retired)
- Joseph Hisajiro Matsunaga † (6 Oct 1990 Appointed – 2 Jun 2006 Died)
- Dominic Ryoji Miyahara (19 Mar 2008 Appointed – 27 Apr 2019 Resigned)
- Josep Maria Abella Batlle (14 Apr 2020 Appointed – Present)

== See also ==
- Roman Catholicism in Japan

== Sources ==
- GCatholic.org
- Catholic Hierarchy
