= St. Francis Xavier Cathedral, Kagoshima =

Church in Kagoshima, Japan

St. Francis Xavier Cathedral
- 聖フランシスコ・デ・ザビエル司教座聖堂
- St. Francis Xavier Cathedral
- Location: Kagoshima
- Country: Japan
- Denomination: Roman Catholic
- Website: xavier-kagoshima.net

The Cathedral of Saint Francis Xavier (Japanese: 聖フランシスコ・デ・ザビエル司教座聖堂), also called the Xavier Church, is the cathedral of the Roman Catholic Diocese of Kagoshima (Dioecesis Kagoshimaensis カトリック鹿児島教区) and seat of the diocesan bishop, currently Paul Kenjiro Koriyama. Located in Kagoshima, Japan, it was named for missionary priest Francis Xavier, who arrived there in August 1549 and founded a Catholic mission.

In 1908 the first stone church was built on the site in recognition of their missionary efforts, but was destroyed during World War II, being replaced by a wooden church in 1949 and the present church in 1999. It was elevated to cathedral status in 1955 with the erection of the diocese by Pope Pius XII with the Bull Qua sollicitudine.

== See also ==
- Catholic Church in Japan
