= Rogério Cezar de Cerqueira Leite =

Brazilian physicist and engineer (1931–2024)

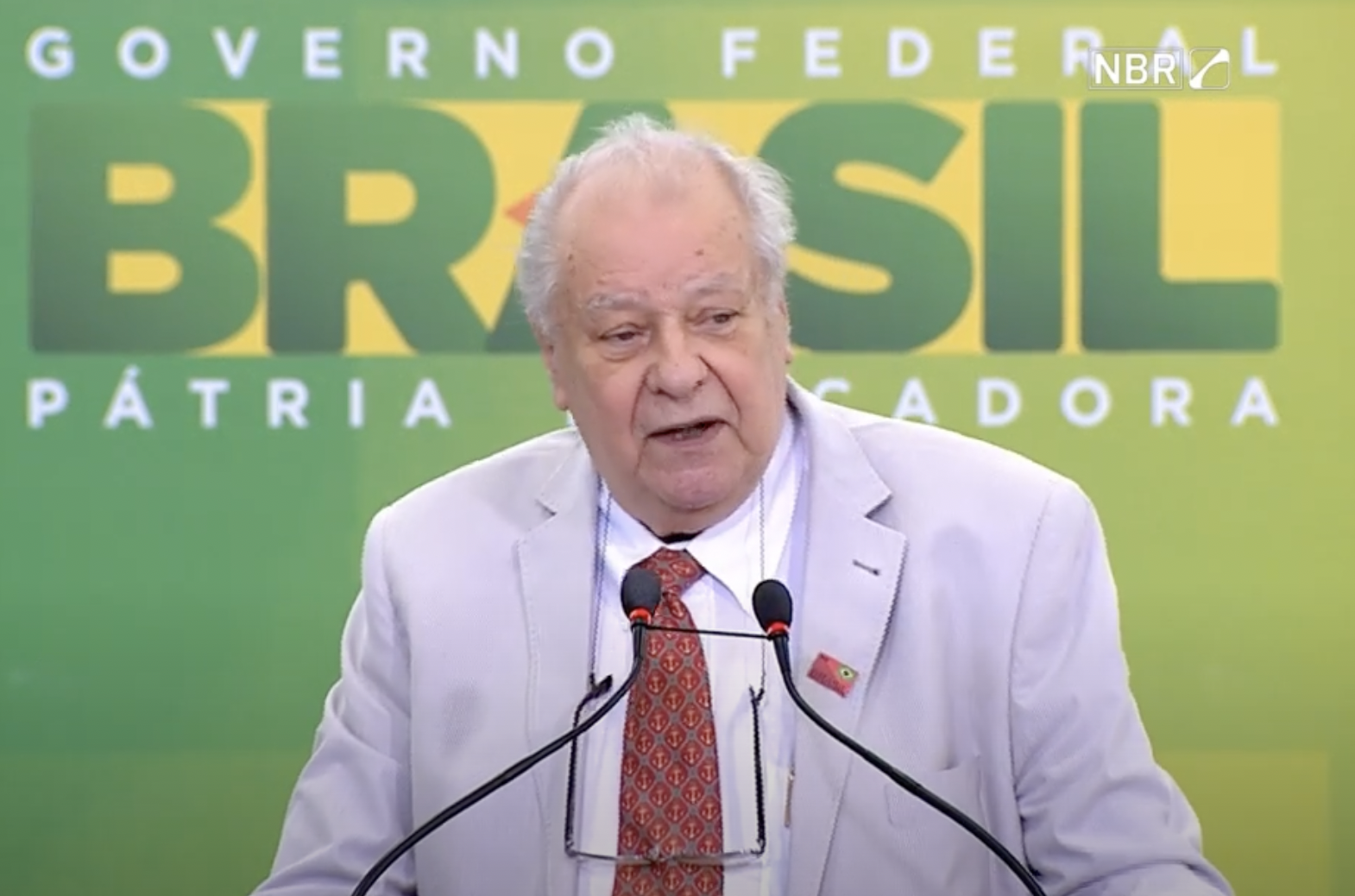
- Leite in 2016
- Born: 14 July 1931; Santo Anastácio, São Paulo, Brazil
- Died: 1 December 2024 (aged 93); Campinas, São Paulo, Brazil
- Occupations: Physicist, engineer

Rogério Cezar de Cerqueira Leite (14 July 1931 – 1 December 2024) was a Brazilian physicist and engineer. He died in Campinas, São Paulo on 1 December 2024, at the age of 93.
