= Paul Aijirō Yamaguchi =

20th-century Japanese Catholic bishop

パウロ 山口愛次郎 Paulus Aijirō Yamaguchi
- Archbishop emeritus of Nagasaki
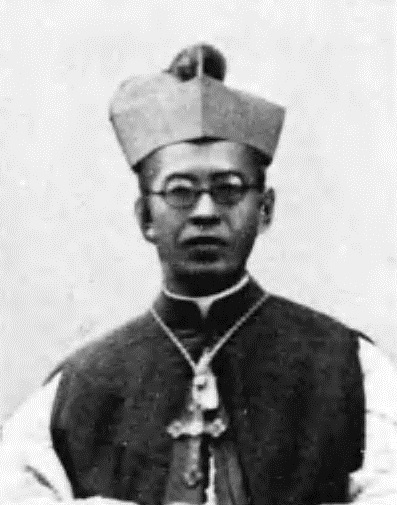
- Church: Catholic Church
- Archdiocese: Nagasaki
- Installed: November 7, 1937 (Appointed on September 27, 1959)
- Term ended: December 19, 1968
- Predecessor: Januarius Kyunosuke Hayasaka
- Successor: Joseph Asjiro Satowaki
- Other post: Kagoshima Apostolic Prefecture (1936–1937)

Orders
- Ordination: December 24, 1923
- Consecration: November 7, 1937

Personal details
- Born: July 14, 1894 Nishisonogi District, Nagasaki, Japan
- Died: September 24, 1976 (aged 82) Nagasaki, Japan

Paul Aijirō Yamaguchi (山口愛次郎, Yamaguchi Aijirō; July 14, 1894 – September 24, 1976) was a Japanese Catholic prelate who served as Archbishop of Nagasaki from 1937 to 1968.

== Biography ==
Yamaguchi was born in Nishisonogi District, Nagasaki (currently part of the city of Nagasaki). He attended the Pontifical Urban University in Rome, where he was consecrated as a priest on December 24, 1923. In 1924, he returned to Nagasaki, where he was appointed priest of the Tainoura Church in Shin-Kamigotō in the Gotō Islands. In 1926, he became a professor at the Nagasaki Catholic University. He was appointed chief priest of the Nakamachi Church in Nagasaki in 1930. From November 1936, he was also appointed to the Prefecture Apostolic of Kagoshima. He was elevated to bishop on November 7, 1937.

In August 1943, Yamaguchi was sent by the Civil Administration Office of the Imperial Japanese Navy’s Southwest Area Fleet to the Japanese-occupied island of Flores in the Netherlands East Indies. Flores had a predominantly Catholic population, and Yamaguchi struggled to obtain a lenient attitude from the Navy authorities towards the local population.

After the end of the war, Yamaguchi returned to the ruins of atomic-bombed Nagasaki, where he devoted his efforts towards the reconstruction of churches destroyed by the bombing. In 1948, in an extraordinary session of the city council, he was appointed to the Nagasaki City Public Safety Commission to oversee reforms of the police administration. He was elevated to archbishop on September 27, 1959, after Nagasaki was promoted to an archdiocese. On June 8, 1962, he presided over a mass commemorating the centenary of canonization of the Twenty-six Martyrs of Japan. From 1962 to 1965, he attended the Second Vatican Council. He retired on December 19, 1968.
