= Helder Diegues Cerqueira de Souza =

Mozambican architect and composer

H. D. Cerqueira de Souza (born in 1963 in Beira, Mozambique) studied Architecture at the Faculty of Architecture (Faculdade de Arquitectura) of the University of Lisbon (Universidade de Lisboa) from 1982 to 1987. She graduated in 1987 under the tutoring of architect Manuel Graça Dias. de Souza studied Music Composition at the Regional Conservatory of Setúbal from 1988 to 1992.

== Books and essays ==
- 150 years of Councilors in Vila Verde Paperback, 2005 (Portuguese)
- 150 anos de Autarcas em Vila Verde Brochado, 2005
- Corruption and Incompetence in the defence and preservation of architectural heritage Hardcover, 2006
- Inventory of Tarouca Paperback, 2006
- Five Portraits in City Hall:the Feyo Dynasty Paperback, 2008
- Brief Carolingian Bibliography Hardcover, 2009
- From Charlemagne to my Father Hardcover, 2009
