= Christian Combaz =

French writer

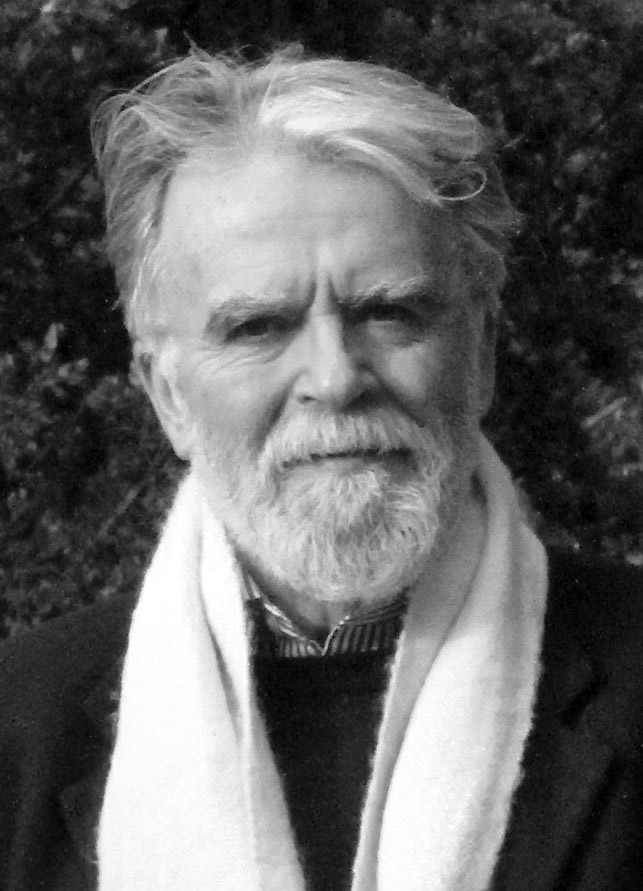
Christian Combaz, French writer

Christian Combaz (born September 21, 1954) is a French writer and columnist who was born into a middle-class family in Algiers, where his father worked for a French petroleum company.

== Biography ==
Christian Combaz spent his early years in Bordeaux. His family moved to Paris in 1968 where he attended college at the fashionable lycée Saint-Louis-de-Gonzague, a Jesuit-run school in the Trocadero district. He graduated at the Sainte-Croix de Neuilly college among the French aristocracy. Some of his early works have been influenced by this education among the privileged. His novels show a typical French narrative touch that the critics called "balzacian", referring to his obsession with social recognition. His first novel, Messieurs, published in 1979 (and 30 years later Votre serviteur in 2015) included a vivid description of the French high-society.

While attending the Sciences-Po in Paris in 1977, he registered a few blocks away at the Beaux-Arts school in sculpture and in the studio run by Claude Viseux. Though socially involved in Paris, Rome and Venice (Montefalco, 1980), he still managed to write a daily column in Le Figaro and published a novel every year, often depicting father/son ambiguous relationships with older churchmen, writers, veterans, war pilots, later portrayed in his autobiographical novel Votre Serviteur.

His literary works in this period included a road-book about Florida, Lettres de Floride. A licensed pilot, he considered making this his career. He pretended to start a career as a reporter/explorer but soon went back to literature and, this time, got instant recognition. "This is real art!", wrote the very influential Angelo Rinaldi in L'Express.

Though often nominated for the annual literary French awards, he kept living in a secluded village and showed no further interest in Parisian circles. Later he referred to these 10 years of exile in his book Gens de Campagnol. Invited to speak in the praised radio show of Alain Finkielkraut, he said that he preferred to devote his art to "those we may call simple but are, finally, as complex as everyone". Long after (2016) he broadcast a daily TV chronicle about "la France de Campagnol" in the same spirit. He still claims to be the voice of "those who are never listened to" . His various columns and chronicles have included throughout the years J'informe, Le Figaro, L'Express, Jeune Afrique, Le Quotidien de Paris, Grands Reportages (1976-1987) and Valeurs actuelles (1995).

He has also translated in French various novels and essays such as Wonder Boys by Michael Chabon or The Face of Battle by John Keegan. He has often stayed in New York City, where his brother was running a business. A few months before September 11, he wrote a futuristic novel, Une heure avant l'éternité, the paperback cover of which prophetically showed the twin towers hacked by a bayonet, picture shot from a New Jersey war monument facing Manhattan.

No longer able to afford the cost of his flying licence, he took up hang-gliding and paragliding. After adopting the latter in its very first years (1987) he published, along with his friend Jacques Ségura, a flight manual, Parapente translated in several countries. At age 62 he is still flying his paraglider on a regular basis.

As an academic sculptor, he started, in 2000, studying and practicing digital 3D, modelling, rendering, animation. It led him to foresee, in his novels, a future world where 3D immersion and entertainment would dominate every aspect of our lives.

Because of an early passion for Hungary (his father had a Hungarian friend), he befriended the famous Hungarian art dealer Tibor de Nagy that he met in New York in 1980 ( who had never returned in Hungary since he fled Budapest in 1947), and he finally convinced him to travel back to his country before his death. This is part of the plot of the "Roman de Budapest", a novelized history of Budapest at the end of which Tibor de Nagy plays his own role, visiting the remains of a lost world. Settling in Budapest for a few months, Combaz wrote Franz (1994) a novel that takes place in the heart the Danubian city, and De l'Est de la Peste et du reste, a plea for a "cultural European parliament", that would be able to defend the core values of European civilization against "violence made commonplace, american taste applied to everything and everyone". In this essay he predicts that Europe will have to protect its values against the mandatory "diversity". In 2016, he tries to start a movement by founding an association, Europe is proud of Hungary, to resist the negative campaign initiated by most liberal newspapers who blame Hungary's rigid policy towards unwanted immigration. Combaz stresses that Hungary endured over 100 years of Islamic rule before the industrial revolution (Ottoman invasion, end of the 17th century), and says that the rest of Europe should bear this in mind.

After having declined the French literary award ordre des Arts et des Lettres in 1992 because he resented the policy of the minister of culture Jack Lang he finally accepted it from his opponent and successor Renaud Donnedieu de Vabres in 2004. He has also been awarded the annual Académie française prize "Eve Delacroix" in recognition for his fiction works.

In 2006, he became director of the French Institute of Milan, (2006-2009). After two further years (2009-2011) spent at the head of another cultural delegation in Zaragoza (Spain) he got back to Le Figaro and published various essays including in 2015 a literary document with the help of a world-famous Belgian endocrinologist Pr Balthazart, Les Âmes douces. In this book he abruptly, scientifically, questioned the religious notion of "against-nature" when it comes to homosexuality, a theme that is present in many of his novels, such as La Compagnie des ombres and La Barque de nuit.

His literary works are available in Spanish, Italian, Portuguese, Russian Serbo-Croat and Dutch

== Bibliography in French ==
=== Novels ===
- Messieurs - Seuil, 1979
- Montefalco - Seuil, 1981
- Constance D - Seuil & Points-roman 1982; réédition - Rocher, 1998
- Oncle Octave - Seuil, 1983
- La Compagnie des ombres - Seuil, 1985
- Le Cercle militaire - Seuil, 1987
- À ceux qu'on n'a pas aimés - Seuil, 1988; réédition - Fayard, 2000
- Chez Cyprien - Laffont, 1990
- Bal dans la maison du pendu - Laffont, 1991
- Franz - Laffont, 1995
- Une petite vie - Flammarion, 1996
- La Clémence de Neptune - Rocher, 1997
- Jours de France - Rocher, 1998
- Le Seigneur d'Uranie - Flammarion, 1999
- La Barque de nuit - Fayard, 2000
- Une heure avant l'éternité - Fayard, 2001
- Nus et vêtus - Fayard, 2002
- Lion ardent ou la confession de Léonard de Vinci - Fayard, 2003
- Cent ans et demi - Fayard, 2006
- Votre serviteur - Flammarion, 2015

=== Essays ===
- Éloge de l'âge - Laffont & LGF, 1987
- Les Sabots d’Émile - Laffont, 1989
- Lettre à Raymond qui ne croit pas au bon Dieu - Laffont 1990
- De l'Est, de la peste et du reste - Laffont 1993
- Égaux et nigauds - Rocher, 2000
- La France mérite mieux que ça - Rocher 2002
- Enfants sans foi ni loi - Rocher, 2003
- Le Roman de Budapest - Rocher, 2006
- Gens de Campagnol - Flammarion, 2012
- Tous les hommes naissent et meurent le même jour - Le Cerf, 2015
- Les Âmes douces - Télémaque, 2015
- Le Troisième âge est un tiers état, Le Cerf 2016

=== Theater ===
- Les Encombrants - L’œil du prince, 2003
- Cheval Rose, 2010
- La Petite Hirondelle, 2014
