= Diocese of Naha =

Latin Catholic diocese in Japan

Coordinates: 26°12′44″N 127°40′45″E

Diocese of Naha Dioecesis Nahana カトリック那覇教区

Location
- Country: Japan
- Territory: Okinawa
- Ecclesiastical province: Nagasaki
- Metropolitan: Nagasaki

Statistics
- Area: 2,266 km^{2} (875 sq mi)
- Population: Total; Catholics: (as of 2004); 1,351,175; 6,118 (0.5%)

Information
- Denomination: Catholic Church
- Sui iuris church: Latin Church
- Rite: Roman Rite
- Established: 18 December 1972
- Cathedral: Cathedral of the Immaculate Heart of Mary in Naha, Okinawa

Current leadership
- Pope: Leo XIV
- Bishop: Wayne Francis Berndt, OFMCap
- Metropolitan Archbishop: Peter Michiaki Nakamura
- Bishops emeritus: Berard Toshio Oshikawa, OFMConv Bishop Emeritus (1997-2017)

Website
- Website of the Diocese

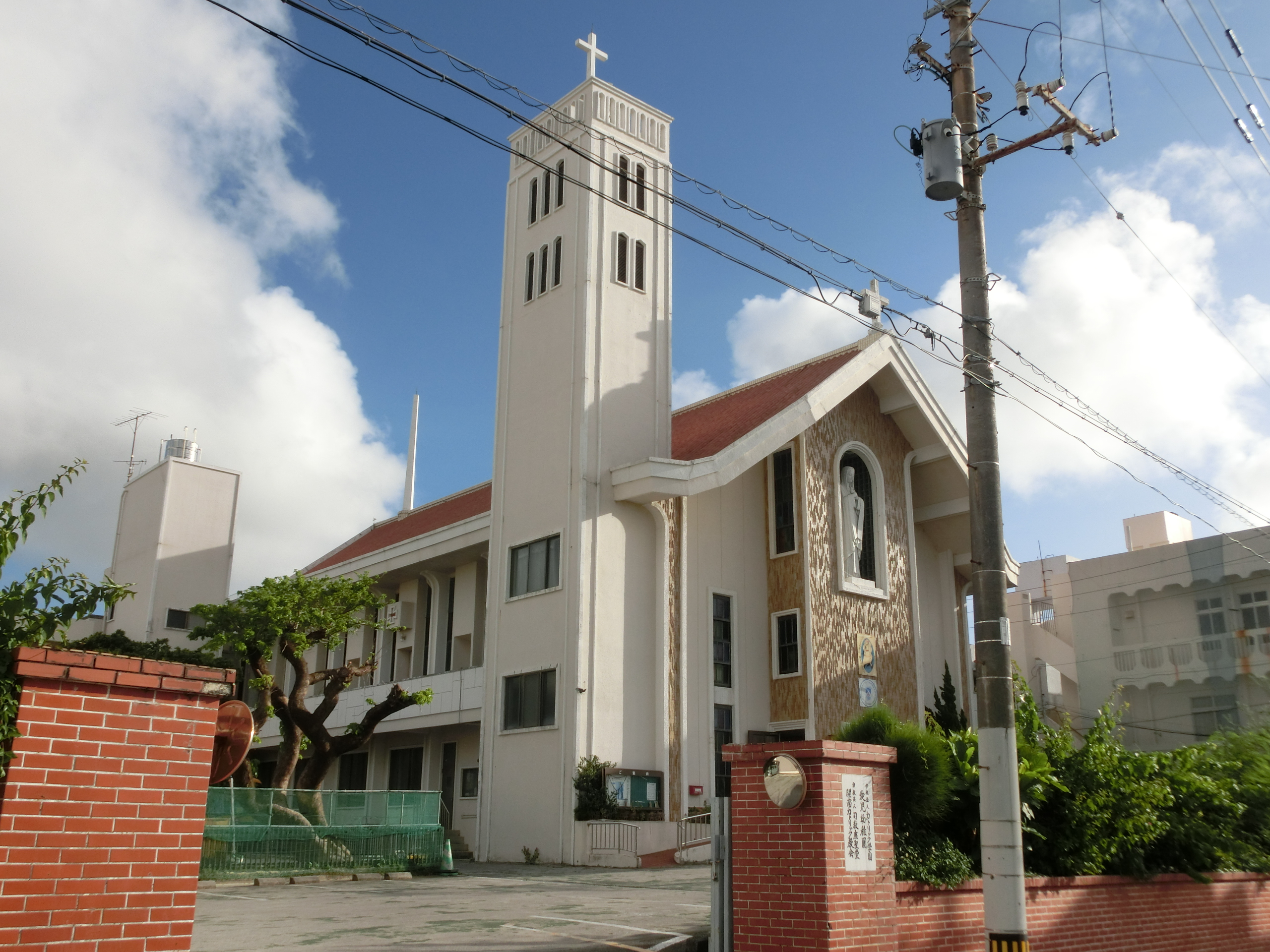
Cathedral of the Immaculate Heart of Mary (Kainan Church).

The Diocese of Naha (Latin: Dioecesis Nahana, Japanese: カトリック那覇教区) is a Latin Catholic diocese of the Catholic Church in the ecclesiastical province of the Metropolitan Nagasaki, in southern Japan.

Its cathedral episcopal see is the Cathedral of the Immaculate Heart of Mary (Kainan Church), located in the city of Naha (on and administrative capital of Okinawa).

== History ==
- Established in 1947 as Apostolic Administration of Okinawa and the Southern Islands alias of (the) Ryukyus, an exempt missionary pre-diocesan jurisdiction, on territory split off from the then Apostolic Prefecture of Kagoshima (now a diocese in the same province).
- Promoted on December 18, 1972 as Diocese of Naha, after its see.

== Ordinaries ==
All Roman Rite, members of a Latin congregation

Apostolic Administrators of Okinawa and the Southern Islands

- Apollinaris William Baumgartner (アポリナリス・バウムガートナー), OFMCap (1947 – 1949), titular bishop of Joppe (Jaffa) (1945.08.25 – 1965.10.14) and apostolic vicar of Guam (1945.08.25 – 1965.10.14), later Bishop of Agaña (Guam) (1965.10.14 – 1970.12.18)
- Felix Ley, OFMCap (1949 – 23 January 1972), titular bishop of Caput Cilla (12 March 1968 – 23 January 1972)

Suffragan Bishops of Naha

- Peter Baptist Tadamaro Ishigami, (ペトロ・バプティスタ石神忠真郎), OFMCap (18 December 1972 – 24 January 1997 retired)
- Berard Toshio Oshikawa, (ベラルド押川壽夫), OFMConv (24 January 1997 – 9 December 2017 retired)
- Wayne Francis Berndt, OFMCap (9 December 2017 - )

== See also ==
- Catholic Church in Japan

== Sources and external links ==
- Diocesan website
- GCatholic.org, with incumbent biography links
- Catholic Bishop's Conference of Japan
