= Our Lady of Victory Cathedral, Fukuoka =

Coordinates: 33.5910°N 130.3974°E

Our Lady of Victory Cathedral
- 聖母の勝利司教座聖堂
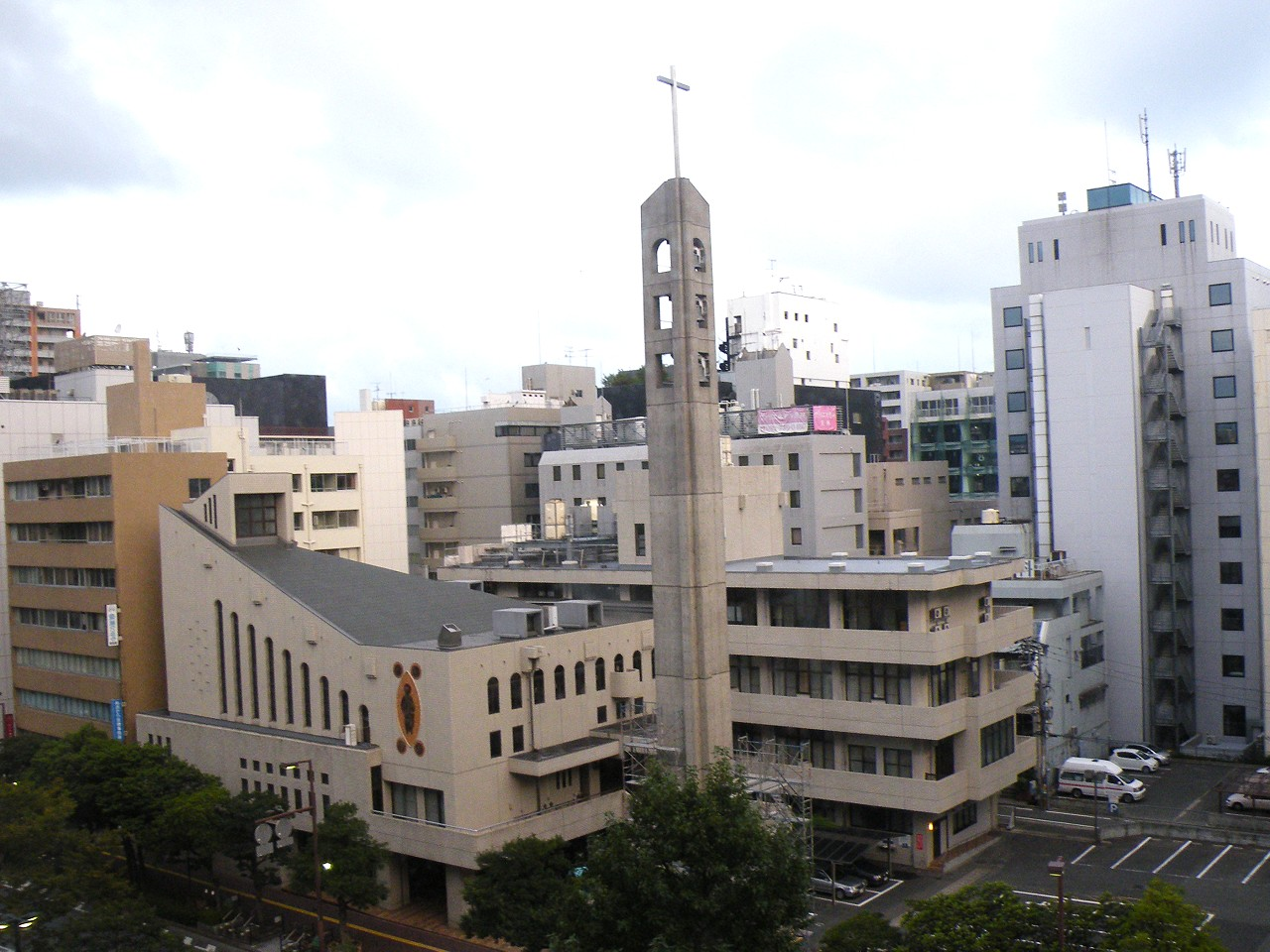
- Our Lady of Victory Cathedral
- Location: Fukuoka
- Country: Japan
- Denomination: Roman Catholic Church

The Our Lady of Victory Cathedral (Japanese: 聖母の勝利司教座聖堂) also called Daimyomachi Church is a religious building affiliated with the Catholic Church located in the city of Fukuoka, Japan. It is dedicated to Our Lady of Victory.

== History ==
In 1896, a small wooden church was built on the site where the present church is located. In 1938, the number of faithful from Fukuoka rose sharply, hence the need to expand the church. It was rebuilt and reinforced with red brick.

In 1984, a restructuring of the church into a cathedral began. The original church was demolished in 1986, and a modern concrete church was built in its place. The main altar was the only part of the old cathedral that was preserved.

== Diocese ==
The church follows the Roman or Latin rite and is the main church of the Catholic diocese of Fukuoka (Dioecesis Fukuokaensis; カトリック福岡教区) which was created in 1927 with the Papal brief Catholicae Fidei under the pontificate of Pope Pius XI.

== See also ==
- Roman Catholicism in Japan
