= Peter Baptist Tadamaro Ishigami =

His Excellency Peter Baptist Tadamaro Ishigami OFMCap
- Bishop Emeritus of Naha
- See: Diocese of Naha
- In office: 1972 - 1997
- Predecessor: None
- Successor: Berard Toshio Oshikawa

Orders
- Ordination: 6 September 1952
- Consecration: 11 February 1973 by Bruno Wüstenberg
- Rank: Bishop

Personal details
- Born: December 1, 1920 Kasari, Kagoshima, Japan
- Died: October 25, 2014 (aged 93) Naha, Okinawa, Japan

Peter Baptist Tadamaro Ishigami, OFMCap (Japanese: ペトロ・バプティスタ石神忠真郎; December 1, 1920 – October 25, 2014) was a Japanese prelate of the Roman Catholic Church.

Ishigami was born in Kasari, Japan and ordained a priest on September 6, 1952 for the Order of Friars Minor Capuchin. Ishigami was appointed Bishop of the Diocese of Naha on December 18, 1972 where served until his retirement on January 24, 1997.
