= Jean Combaz =

Belgian architect (1896–1974)

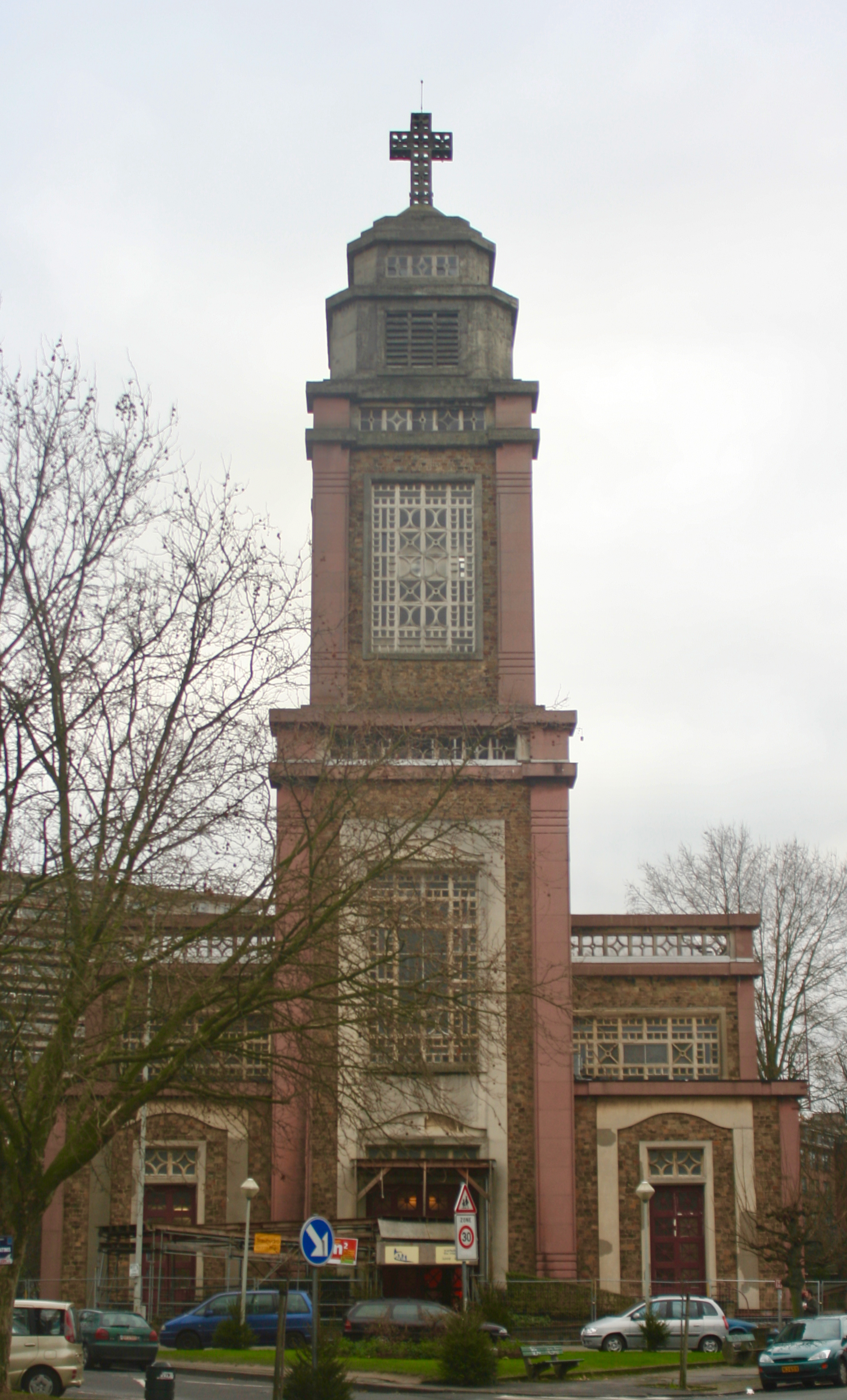
Église Sainte-Suzanne in Schaerbeek, designed by Combaz.

Jean Combaz (1896–1974) was a Belgian architect. He designed the Église Sainte-Suzanne in Schaerbeek, Brussels.
