= Jean-Claude Combaz =

Roman Catholic Bishop of Nagasaki

Jean-Claude Combaz (8 December 1856, Saint-Béron - 1926) was a French clergyman and bishop for the Roman Catholic Archdiocese of Nagasaki. He was ordained in 1880. He was appointed in 1912. He died in 1926.
