= Archdiocese of Nagasaki =

Latin Catholic archdiocese in Japan

Archdiocese of Nagasaki Archidioecesis Nagasakiensis カトリック長崎大司教区
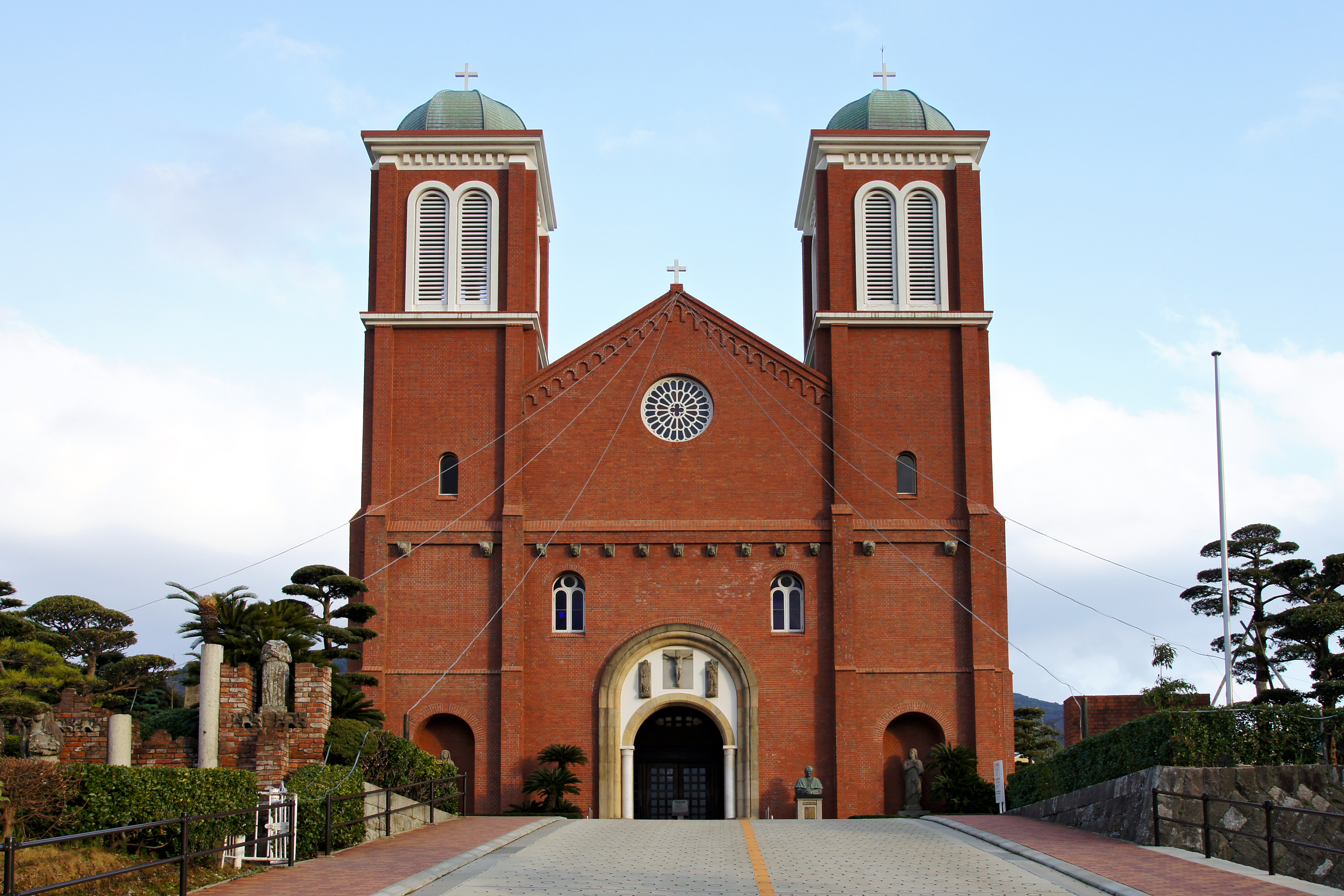
- Cathedral of the Archdiocese

Location
- Country: Japan
- Territory: Nagasaki
- Ecclesiastical province: Nagasaki

Statistics
- Area: 4,192 km^{2} (1,619 sq mi)
- Population: Total; Catholics: (as of 2023); 1,279,871; 57,692 (4.5%)

Information
- Denomination: Catholic Church
- Sui iuris church: Latin Church
- Rite: Roman Rite
- Cathedral: Immaculate Conception Cathedral in Nagasaki

Current leadership
- Pope: Leo XIV
- Metropolitan Archbishop: Peter Michiaki Nakamura
- Bishops emeritus: Joseph Mitsuaki Takami

Map
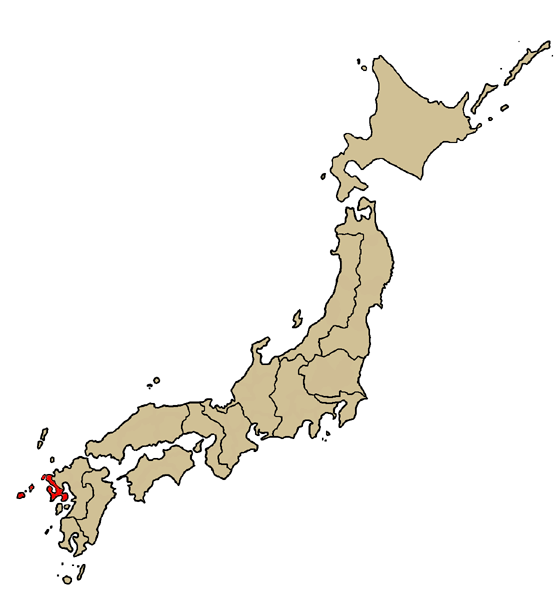

Website
- Website of the Diocese

The Archdiocese of Nagasaki (Latin: Archidioecesis Nagasakiensis, Japanese: カトリック長崎大司教区) is a Latin Catholic archdiocese of the Catholic Church located in the city of Nagasaki in Japan.

== History ==
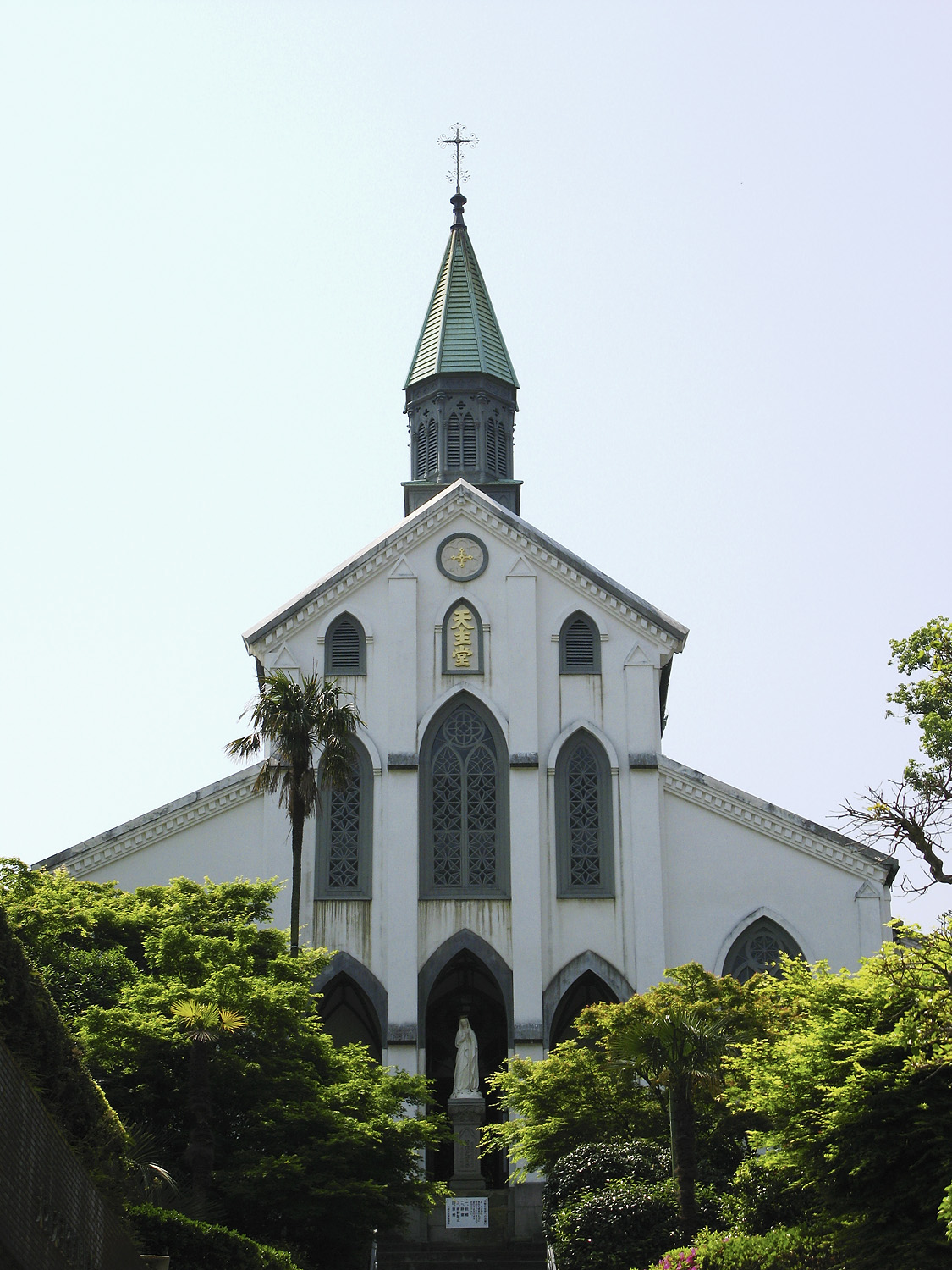
The Basilica of the Twenty-Six Holy Martyrs of Japan. It also functions as a co-cathedral.

The Apostolic Vicariate of Japan was headed by Bishop Bernard Petitjean, M.E.P., who moved the vicariate's residence from Yokohama to Nagasaki in 1866, giving rise to the Diocese of Nagasaki. Bishop Petitjean was the Apostolic Vicar of the Apostolic Vicariate of Southern Japan, which had authority over the territories of Kinki, Chugoku, Shikoku, and Kyushu, when the Apostolic Vicariate of Japan was split into the Northern and Southern Apostolic Vicariates in 1876. The three regions of Kinki, Chugoku, and Shikoku were given over to the Apostolic Vicariate of Central Japan upon its establishment in 1888. Only the Kyushu region fell under the Apostolic Vicariate of Southern Japan's jurisdiction. On June 15, 1891, the Apostolic Vicariate of Southern Japan was raised to the status of a Diocese and constituted Nagasaki Diocese.

Apostolic Prefecture of Kagoshima was formed on March 18, 1927, combining the prefectures of Kagoshima and Okinawa. After the five prefectures of Fukuoka, Saga, Kumamoto, Miyazaki, and Oita were combined into the newly formed Fukuoka Diocese, Nagasaki Diocese became the first diocese under a Japanese ordinary on July 16 of that year. It was then divided from the Paris Foreign Mission Society and had jurisdiction over only Nagasaki prefecture. After being appointed ordinary, Fr. Kyunosuke Hayasaka became the first Japanese person to be consecrated as a bishop on October 30 of that same year. Bishop Hayasaka resigned in 1937, making Fr. Aijiro Yamaguchi the ordinary after his consecration.

Bishop Yamaguchi became the first Archbishop of Nagasaki when the Diocese of Nagasaki was promoted to the status of an Archdiocese on May 14, 1959. On December 19, 1968, Bishop Asajiro Satowaki of Kagoshima was named Archbishop Yamaguchi's successor following his resignation. On March 16 of the following year, he was consecrated as Nagasaki's Archbishop. Fr. Hisajiro Matsunaga was installed as Nagasaki's auxiliary bishop in 1978. Archbishop Satowaki became the third Japanese cardinal on June 30, 1979. Cardinal Satowaki resigned as archbishop on February 8, 1990, and Bishop Kaname Shimamoto, the bishop of Urawa, was named as his replacement. That same year, on May 8, he was installed. Bishop Matsunaga was consecrated as the Bishop of Fukuoka on January 15, 1991.

On January 23, 2002, Sulpician Fr. Mitsuaki Takami was named Nagasaki's auxiliary bishop, and on April 29, of the same year, he was consecrated as bishop. Following the death of Archbishop Shimamoto on August 31, 2002, the episcopal see was vacant. Auxiliary Bishop Takami was named Archbishop of Nagasaki on October 4, 2003, and enthroned on December 14 of the same year.

On May 31, 2019, Sulpician Fr. Michiaki Nakamura was named Nagasaki's auxiliary bishop, and on September 16 of the same year, he was consecrated as a bishop. Auxiliary Bishop Michiaki Nakamura was appointed Archbishop of Nagasaki on December 28, 2021, and enthroned on February 23, 2022 after Archbishop Mitsuaki Takami tendered his resignation on that same day. There are two popes who have visited this diocese, namely Pope John Paul II in February 1981 and Pope Francis in November 2019.

== Leadership ==
The list of diocesan leaders below is quoted from the official website of the Catholic Bishops' Conference of Japan.

- Most Rev. Bernard Petitjean, M.E.P. (1866-1884)
- Most Rev. Joseph Marie Laucaigne, M.E.P. (1884-1885)
- Most Rev. Jules Alphonse Cousin, M.E.P. (1885-1911)
- Most Rev. Jean-Claude Combaz, M.E.P. (1912-1926)
- Most Rev. Januarius Kyunosuke Hayasaka (1927-1937)
- Most Rev. Paul Aijiro Yamaguchi (1937-1968)
- His Eminence Cardinal Joseph Asajiro Satowaki (1969-1990)
- Most Rev. Francis Xavier Kaname Shimamoto (1990-2002)
- Most Rev. Joseph Mitsuaki Takami, S.S. (2003-2021)
- Most Rev. Peter Michiaki Nakamura (2022-present)

== Suffragan dioceses ==
The Archdiocese of Nagasaki has 4 suffragan dioceses located in southern Japan, namely the dioceses of Fukuoka (福岡), Kagoshima (鹿児島), Naha (那覇), and Oita (大分).

== See also ==
- Catholic Church in Japan
