= Paul Shinichi Itonaga =

- Bishop of the Roman Catholic Diocese of Kagoshima
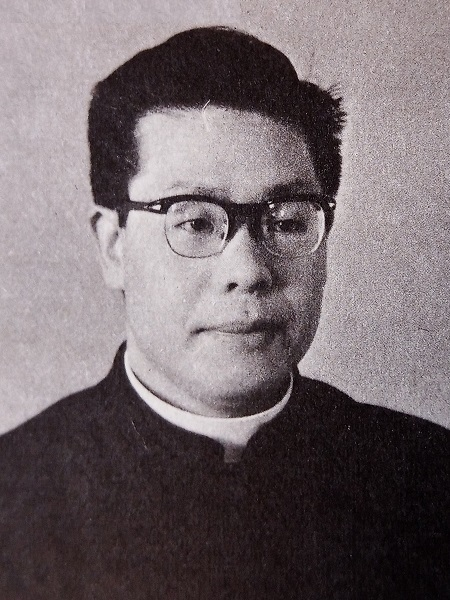
- In office: 1969-2005

Orders
- Ordination: 1952

Personal details
- Born: July 23, 1928
- Died: December 10, 2016 (aged 88)
- Denomination: Roman Catholic

Paul Shinichi Itonaga (July 23, 1928 – December 10, 2016) was a Roman Catholic bishop.

Ordained to the priesthood in 1952, Itonaga served as bishop of the Roman Catholic Diocese of Kagoshima, Japan, from 1969 to 2005.
