= Paul Sueo Hamaguchi =

Japanese Bishop (1948–2020)

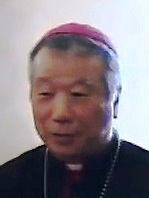
Paul Sueo Hamaguchi

Paul Sueo Hamaguchi (1 August 1948 – 28 December 2020) was a Japanese Roman Catholic bishop.

Hamaguchi was born in Japan and was ordained to the priesthood in 1975. He served as bishop of the Roman Catholic Diocese of Oita, Japan, from 2011 until his death in 2020.
