= Peter Michiaki Nakamura =

Japanese Catholic archbishop

The Most Reverend Peter Michiaki Nakamura
- Metropolitan Archbishop of Nagasaki
- Native name: 中村倫明
- Church: Catholic Church
- Archdiocese: Nagasaki
- See: Nagasaki
- Appointed: 28 December 2021
- Installed: 23 February 2022
- Predecessor: Joseph Mitsuaki Takami
- Previous posts: Auxiliary Bishop of Nagasaki; Titular Bishop of Fesseë

Orders
- Ordination: 19 March 1988
- Consecration: 16 September 2019 by Joseph Mitsuaki Takami

Personal details
- Born: 21 March 1962 (age 64) Saikai, Nagasaki, Nagasaki Prefecture, Japan
- Education: Alphonsian Academy
- Motto: DARE UT CHRISTUS, CUM CHRISTO
- Coat of arms

Peter Michiaki Nakamura is a Japanese prelate of the Catholic Church who became Archbishop of the Archdiocese of Nagasaki, Japan in 2022. He was an auxiliary bishop there from 2019 to 2022.

== Early life and education ==
Nakamura was born in the town of Ōshima (merged in 2005 into Saikai), Nagasaki, Japan, on 21 March 1962. He studied at the Nagasaki minor seminary. He studied philosophy and theology at the Saint Sulpitius Major Seminary in Fukuoka. He earned a licentiate in moral theology at the Alphonsian Academy in Rome in 1994.

== Priesthood ==
Nakamura was ordained a priest on 19 March 1988. He was responsible for formation at the minor seminary of the Archdiocese of Nagasaki (1988-1989) and parish vicar in Nakamachi (1989-1991). He did additional studies in moral theology in Rome (1991-1994). He returned to his role at the minor seminary (1994-1999), was parish vicar in the cathedral parish of Urakami (1999-2002), and pastor in Togitsu (2002-2005). He was responsible for formation at the major seminary in Fukuoka (2005-2007) and then pastor in Uematsu (2007-2014). From 2009 to 2019 he taught moral theology at the major seminaries of Fukuoka and Tokyo. From 2014 to 2019 he was also pastor of Miura-machi.

== Episcopate ==
Nakamura was appointed Auxiliary Bishop of Nagasaki and Titular Bishop of Fesseë on 31 May 2019. He was consecrated a bishop on 16 September 2019 by Archbishop Joseph Mitsuaki Takami. On 28 December 2021, he was appointed Archbishop of Nagasaki by Pope Francis, and installed as archbishop on 23 February 2022.
