= Pedro Calungsod: Batang Martir =

- Directed by: Francis Villacorta
- Written by: Francis Villacorta
- Produced by: Will Fredo; Charles Stewart Lee; Ida Tiongson
- Starring: Rocco Nacino; Christian Vasquez; Jestoni Alarcon; Ryan Eigenmann; Robert Correa; Victor Basa; Mercedes Cabral
- Cinematography: Dexter dela Peña
- Edited by: Tara Illenberger
- Music by: Emlyn Santos; Noel Diño Espenida
- Production companies: Wings Entertainment; Hubo Productions
- Distributed by: HPI Synergy Group
- Release date: December 25, 2013
- Running time: 107 minutes
- Country: Philippines
- Language: Tagalog

Pedro Calungsod: Batang Martir (lit. 'Pedro Calungsod: Young Martyr'), also known as Journey of a Young Saint, is a 2013 Philippine biographical film depicting the life and martyrdom of Pedro Calungsod. Written and directed by Francis O. Villacorta and produced by HPI Synergy Group and Wings Entertainment, it was released on December 25, 2013, as an official entry to the 39th Metro Manila Film Festival.

A feature film adaptation of the docudrama television special aired on GMA News TV on October 21, 2012, in line with the Calungsod's canonization, Rocco Nacino reprises his role as the saint, who is only the second Filipino canonised by the Catholic Church after Lorenzo Ruíz de Manila.

== Plot ==
Pedro Calungsod, a young Filipino catechist, leaves his Visayan home and joins a group of Jesuit missionaries under Diego Luis de San Vitores in evangelizing the native Chamorros of the Mariana Islands and Guam.

== Cast ==
- Rocco Nacino as Pedro Calungsod

The second Filipino saint of the Roman Catholic church, who was killed in Guam while spreading Christianity. Nacino replaced JM De Guzman for the title role. According to Villacorta, Nacino was chosen to play lead because of his depth. He also added, "I always look at the eyes of actors. If his eyes are saying something deep[...] that is where I find the emotional connection and his eyes speak volumes. That, for me, is very important[...]And I know how serious he is with his craft." According to Nacino, "It's a huge leap in my career[...]Right now, I'm doing so many characters, which are emotionally and mentally taxing on my part. I am not complaining though. The role of Pedro will take a lot of research and training. I need to learn Spanish, Latin and Visayan. That aspect alone is daunting, but I know kaya ko (I can make it). One of these days, I am attending a Latin mass so that I (will) know how it feels. I want to experience it so that aurally. I will be used to it" Marc Justine Alvarez was cast as the young Calungsod. Some of the shortlisted actors for the role includes Paulo Avelino, Alden Richards and Coco Martin.

- Christian Vasquez as Padre Diego Luis de San Vitores

Padre Diego de San Vitores is a Spanish priest and father figure of Pedro Calungsod, the man instrumental to the young man's passionate belief in Jesus Christ. According to Vazquez, "...playing a true-to-life character, as an actor, it poses quite a challenge because you must really flesh him out. You don't only make him authentic for the sake of authenticity; you also give him a lot of heart and honest to goodness emotions." He also studied Spanish and Latin at the University of the Philippines under Dr. Daisy Lopez.

- Jestoni Alarcon as Captain Juan de Sta. Cruz
- Ryan Eigenmann as Choco

Choco is a Chinese from Manila who was exiled in Marianas Island (present-day Guam), who, because of being envious of the prestige that the Missionaries were gaining among the Chamorros, started to spread nasty rumors against them.

- Robert Correa as Maga'lahi Hurao. Chamorro chieftain who was the patriot of the Marianas

Hirao is the chief of the Chamorro warriors who killed the young Visayan catechist, Calungsod.

- Victor Basa as Padre Francisco Solano

Padre Francisco Solano is a Spanish priest. This will be Basa's second time to act as priest, the first on ABS-CBN's 2009–2010 drama series May Bukas Pa. He had his training with a language specialist to make sure his accent is correct. Since Spanish people may watch the film, the actor said he wants to give justice to speaking their language. According to him, the role of a priest is something close to his heart, and something that is close to his real character.

- Carlo Gonzales as Padre Tomas de Cadeñoso
- Andrew Schimmer as Sgt. Maj. Don Juan de Santiago
- Arthur Solinap as Padre Luis de Medina
- Mico Palanca as Padre Pedro de Casanova
- Geoff Taylor as Sgt. Lorenzo Castellanos
- Alvin Aragon as Ignacio
- Juancho Trivino as Manuel Rangel
- Johann Santos as Juan de los Reyes
- Jao Mapa as Tatang
- Isadora Villasquez as Ma'urritao
- Mercedes Cabral as Ahnha the Adulteress
- Kimo Paez as Maga'lahi Quipuha
- Junar Labrador as Lorenzo de Morales
- Kuya Manzano as Spanish Official (also translated most Spanish lines of the script)
- Johnron Tañada as Maga'lahi Quipuha II
- BJ Forbes as Francisco
- Charlton Laurence Villanueva as Maga'lahi Matå'pang
- Marc Justine Alvarez II as young Pedro Calungsod
- CJ Santos as Spanish Soldier
- Jhaymarie "Jm" Villacorta as Esmeralda Jimenez
- Don Gordon Bell as Pedro Jimenez
- Migui Moreno as Padre Lopez
- Jeremiah Sird as Islander

== Background and development ==
=== Development ===
The idea for the film came to Villacorta three years ago when he came across two lengthy articles on Calungsod by John Schumacher, a Jesuit priest. According to him, "Early 2011, I began digging deeper into the story of the young martyr by researching the story of his superior, Fr. Diego Luis de San Vitores, and the San Diego Mission to the Marianas (now Guam)..." The research of the film took two years while the pre-production spent almost a year. According to the writer and director, Francis Villacorta, "Young people today can learn a lot from the heroic life of San Pedro Calungsod. Ordinary as he was, being a young catechist and mission assistant, the dedication to his work and his devotion to God is all too inspiring[...]this is a fascinating study of a young life all too willingly given up for the love of our Savior. Honestly, I believe our life on earth is all but a preparation for our reunion with Him, our Creator in the end..." When asked how would they draw the attention of Filipinos to watch the movie, he stressed that the audience will appreciate the adventure, fears and tensions in the film. He stated, "Just like him[San Pedro Calungsod], it was a short life but a meaningful one[...]There should be a celebration of Christianity which is our aim and hope of this film...".

In June 2013, the script was submitted for the official selection of the 2013 Metro Manila Film Festival along with 12 other movies from various producers. On June 18, 2013, Metropolitan Manila Development Authority chairman, Francis Tolentino announced the movie as one of the 8 official entries of the said festival.JM De Guzman was originally chosen to play the character of Calungsod, but withdrew for health reasons. According to his team, De Guzman is attending to some health concerns, it might take time for him to concentrate and focus on his work ahead. On August 11, 2013, teen actor Rocco Nacino was announced as the official actor who will play Calungsod on the film.

=== Concept ===
Calungsod (spelled Calonsor in Spanish records) was born ca. 1654. Historical records never mentioned his exact place of origin and merely identified him as "Pedro Calonsor, El Visayo". Historical research identifies Ginatilan in Cebu, Hinunangan and Hinundayan in Southern Leyte, and Molo district in Iloilo as probable places of origin. Loboc in Bohol also makes a claim. These locations were parts of the "Diocese of Cebu" during the time of Calungsod's martyrdom.

Calungsod, then around 14, was amongst the exemplary young catechists chosen to accompany the Jesuits in their mission to the Ladrones Islands (Islas de los Ladrones or “Isles of Thieves”). In 1668, Calungsod travelled with Spanish Jesuit missionaries to these islands, renamed the Mariana Islands (Las Islas de Mariana) the year before in honour of both the Virgin Mary and of the Queen Regent of Spain, María Ana of Austria, who funded their voyage. Calungsod and San Vitores went to Guam to catechise the native Chamorros.

In 1980, then-Cebu Archbishop Cardinal Ricardo Vidal asked permission from the Vatican to initiate the beatification and canonisation cause of Pedro Calungsod. Wanting to include young Asian laypersons in his first beatification for the Jubilee Year 2000, John Paul II paid particular attention to the cause of Calungsod. In January 2000, he approved the decree super martyrio (concerning the martyrdom) of Calungsod, setting his beatification for March 5, 2000, at Saint Peter's Square in Rome.

Regarding Calungsod's charitable works and virtuous deeds, Pope John Paul II declared:

...From his childhood, Pedro Calungsod declared himself unwaveringly for Christ and responded generously to his call. Young people today can draw encouragement and strength from the example of Pedro, whose love of Jesus inspired him to devote his teenage years to teaching the faith as a lay catechist. Leaving family and friends behind, Pedro willingly accepted the challenge put to him by Fr. Diego de San Vitores to join him on the Mission to the Chamorros. In a spirit of faith, marked by strong Eucharistic and Marian devotion, Pedro undertook the demanding work asked of him and bravely faced the many obstacles and difficulties he met. In the face of imminent danger, Pedro would not forsake Fr. Diego, but as a "good soldier of Christ" preferred to die at the missionary's side.

On October 21, 2012, Pope Benedict XVI canonized Calungsod in Saint Peter's Square. After Saint Lorenzo Ruiz, Calungsod is the second Filipino to be declared a saint by the Roman Catholic Church.

=== Filming ===
Filming took place from September to November 2013. A small community is set up in Lobo, Batangas to simulate the Marianas. Location includes nipa huts and palm trees. The male population of the natives wear g-strings while the women use their hair to cover their breasts. Another huge structure is being built to serve as a chapel. Production even created a temple that is adorned with a huge Buddha and Chinese furnishing. Some scenes also took place at Honey Beach Resort in Batangas, Sapatos Island in Zambales, Morong, Rizal and few locations in Cebu.

== Marketing and promotions ==
On October 6 and 7, the cast of the film had a series of mall shows in Cebu, home of Calungsod. On its press conference, the first trailer was released publicly being the first of the 8 MMFF entries to release a teaser. The official teaser was finally released on November 26, 2013, through video-sharing site, YouTube.

== Critical reception ==
In response to the criticisms Filipinos gave to the 2019 Spanish animated film Elcano & Magellan regarding its offensive portrayal of Filipino natives, academic Jorge Mojarro countered that the Filipino film Pedro Calungsod likewise portrayed Chamorro people as "uncivilized and cruel barbarians", and thus was "very, very unwelcomed in Guam."
