= Ayhi =

Ayhi, also known by his baptismal name Antonio Ayhi or Antonio de Ayhi, was a Chamorro political and military leader from Haputo on Guam who was active during the Spanish-Chamorro Wars of the late seventeenth century. Ayhi was a maga'låhi, a male who led a Chamorro clan with a female maga'håga counterpart, typically translated as "chief" in Western sources. He was baptized sometime after the arrival of Jesuit missionary Diego Luis de San Vitores in 1668. Before the first siege of the presidio at Hagatña in 1670, Ayhi warned the Spanish of maga'låhi Hurao's intent to attack, allowing Spanish time to prepare. In January 1675, Ayhi led a force of warriors to assist Governor of the Spanish Marianas Damián de Esplana and his column of Spanish soldiers in their campaign to subdue rebellious villages.

The next year, when maga'låhi Agualin prepared for second siege, Ayhi tried to calm anti-Spanish sentiment and refused to allow rebels to pass through his village. As open conflict became imminent, Ayhi brought a group of warriors to reinforce the defenders. However, the Spanish feared that this action would have repercussions upon his clan and advised him to leave. One historian notes, Ayhi "avoided all signs of friendship with the Spanish, the better to help them without doing harm to himself." During this second siege from October 1675 to January 1676, Ayhi attempted to bring food to the Spanish across the siege lines. The Spanish record that Ayhi remained a strong supporter of the Spanish even when he left his wife for a time to live with a mistress, against the teachings of the Catholic mission. When he gave up his mistress to return to his wife, rebels said that he was "nothing but a lackey of the priests."

When Antonio de Savaria arrived to take the post of Governor in June 1681, as one of his first acts he appointed Antonio Ayhi Lieutenant Governor of the colony and gave him the title maestre-de-campo, roughly "colonel". Ayhi then convinced other village chiefs to take the Spanish oath of allegiance on September 8, 1681. This was a critical step in the Spanish pacification of Guam. The last throes of violent Chamorro resistance were put down in 1684. The presence of Ayhi and other prominent Chamorro Christians is recorded at a 1689 ceremony to install a statue of Santa Marian Kamalen, which had already become the Patroness of Guam, at a church at Pago Bay.
