= Chief Quipuha Park =

Park in Guam

Coordinates: 13.4773°N 144.7540°E

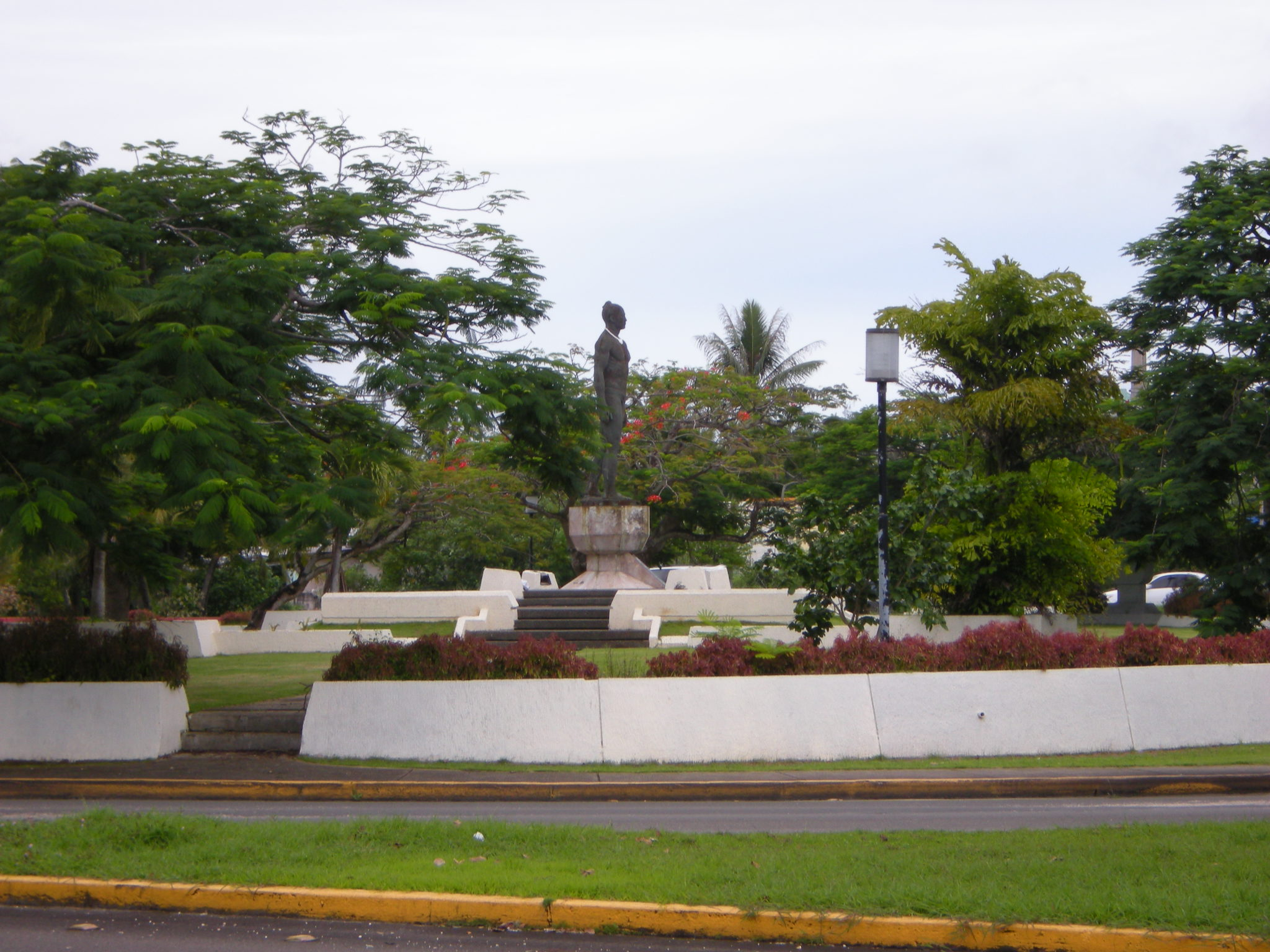
The statue of Kepuha stands within a traffic roundabout in the park

Chief Quipuha Park is located on the Paseo de Susana peninsula, in the north of the city of Hagåtña, in the United States territory of Guam. Like the rest of the peninsula, the area was created after World War II from bulldozed debris from the ruined city. It is named for Kepuha (Quipuha), the chief who gave land to Diego Luis de San Vitores for the first European settlement on the island at Hagåtña.
