= Pedro Calungsod =

Second Filipino saint and Martyr

Saint Pedro Calungsod
- Calungsod on a stained-glass window in Cubao Cathedral

Martyr
- Born: July 21, 1654; Ginatilan, Cebu, Captaincy General of the Philippines, Spanish East Indies
- Died: April 2, 1672 (aged 17); Tumon, Guam, Captaincy General of the Philippines, Spanish East Indies
- Venerated in: Catholic Church
- Beatified: March 5, 2000, St. Peter's Basilica, Vatican City by Pope John Paul II
- Canonized: October 21, 2012, St. Peter's Basilica, Vatican City by Pope Benedict XVI
- Major shrine: Cebu Archdiocesan Shrine of Saint Pedro Calungsod, Archbishop's Residence Compound, 234 D. Jakosalem Street, Cebu City 6000 PH
- Feast: October 21; April 2 (before 2025)
- Attributes: Martyr's palm, Spear, Bolo, Doctrina Christiana book, Rosary, Christogram, Crucifix
- Patronage: Filipino youth, Catechumens, Altar servers, the Philippines, Overseas Filipino Workers, Cebuanos, Visayans, Archdiocese of Cebu, Pury, San Antonio, Quezon Province

Pedro Calungsod (Spanish: Pedro Calúñgsod or archaically Pedro Calonsor; July 21, 1654 – April 2, 1672), also known as Peter Calungsod and Pedro Calonsor, was a Catholic Filipino-Visayan migrant, sacristan and missionary catechist who, along with the Spanish Jesuit missionary Diego Luis de San Vitores, proselytized and converted the indigenous people of Guam which led to both missionaries being martyred in 1672.

While in Guam, Calungsod preached Christianity to the Chamorros through catechesis, while baptizing infants, children, and adults through colonization. Through Calungsod and San Vitores's missionary efforts, many native Chamorros were converted to Catholicism. He remains a contentious figure in Chamorro history and scholarly research for his involvement in the Spanish–Chamorro Wars, where the indigenous Chamorro peoples were brutally decimated through colonization and genocide.

Calungsod was beatified on March 5, 2000, by Pope John Paul II, and canonized by Pope Benedict XVI at Saint Peter's Basilica in Vatican City on October 21, 2012, alongside six others, including Kateri Tekakwitha, Giovanni Battista Piamarta, and Marianne of Molokaʻi.

== Early years and missionary work ==
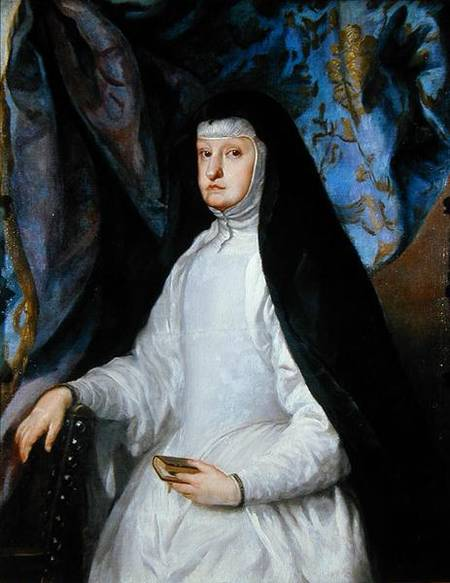
Queen Mariana of Austria, Regent of Spain, the benefactress of the mission to the Ladrones Islands later named in her honor.

=== Birthplace dispute ===
Few details of the early life of Calungsod (spelled Calonsor in Spanish records) are known. Historical records do not mention his exact birthplace or birth date and merely identified him as "Pedro Calonsor, el Visayo". Historical research identifies Ginatilan in Cebu, Hinunangan and Hinundayan in Southern Leyte, Baybay in Leyte, and the Molo district of Iloilo City as possible places of origin; Loboc, Bohol also makes a claim. Of these claims, the one from Ginatilan, Cebu, is considered the strongest. Nonetheless, all four locations were within the Diocese of Cebu at the time of Calungsod's martyrdom.

Proponents of an Ilonggo origin argue that in the early Spanish period, the term "Visayan" exclusively referred to people from the island of Panay and the nearby islands of Negros and Romblon. In contrast, people from Cebu, Bohol, and Leyte were called "Pintados". Thus, had he been born in Cebu, he would have been referred to as "Calonsor El Pintado" instead of "Calonsor El Visayo"; the term "Visayan" receiving its present scope (i.e., including inhabitants of Cebu, Bohol, and Leyte) sometime the 1700s. However, American historian and scholar John N. Schumacher disputes the Bisaya/Pintados dichotomy claim as at that time the Pintados were also referred to as Visayans regardless of location and said Calungsod "was a Visayan" and may have been but doubtfully "from the island of Cebu" or "could have come any other Visayas islands".

The Cebu camp reasoned that Ginatilan contains a high density of people surnamed Calungsod and that during the beatification process, they were the initial claimants to having been Calungsod's birthplace. The Calungsods of Iloilo also claim to be the oldest branch, based on baptismal records containing the surname "Calungsod" dating to circa 1748, compared to branches in Cebu and Leyte, which possess baptismal records dating only to 1828 and 1903, respectively.

=== Training and force-conversions in Guam ===
In Cebu, Calungsod received primary education at a Jesuit boarding school, mastering the Catechism and learning to communicate in Spanish. He also likely honed his drawing, painting, singing, acting, and carpentry skills, as these were necessary for missionary work.

In 1668, Calungsod, then around 14, was amongst the young catechists chosen to accompany Spanish Jesuit missionaries to the Islas de Los Ladrones ("Isles of Thieves"), which had been renamed the Mariana Islands the year before to honor both the Virgin Mary and the mission's benefactress, María Ana of Austria, Queen Regent of Spain. Calungsod accompanied the priest Diego San Vitores to Guam to catechize the native Chamorros. Missionary life on the island was difficult as provisions did not arrive regularly, the jungles and terrain were difficult to traverse, and the Marianas were frequently devastated by typhoons. Through colonization, the conversion mission resulted to a significant number of locals being baptized, many were converted without their consent. After a series of force-conversions, Diego Luis de San Vitores and Pedro Calungsod continued and forcefully converted the small daughter of Chief Matå'pang, the leader of the indigenous Chamorro people, without the consent of the child or the child's father. This colonial disrespect caused Chief Matå'pang to defend his community from the colonizers, ending with the death of Calungsod and Vitores in 1672, similar to how Lapulapu defended his people against the colonizer Magellan in the Philippines.

== Beatification ==
A month after the martyrdom of San Vitores and Calungsod, a process for beatification was initiated but only for San Vitores. Political and religious turmoil, however, delayed and halted the process for centuries. In 1981, as Hagåtña was preparing for its 20th anniversary as a diocese, the 1673 beatification cause of San Vitores was rediscovered in old manuscripts and revived until he was finally beatified on October 6, 1985. This also gave recognition to Calungsod, paving the way for his beatification.

In 1980, Cardinal Ricardo Vidal, then-Archbishop of Cebu, asked permission from the Vatican to initiate Calungsod's beatification and canonization cause. In March 1997, the Sacred Congregation for the Causes of Saints approved the acta of the diocesan beatification process. That same year, Vidal appointed Ildebrando Leyson as vice-postulator for the cause, tasked with compiling a Positio Super Martyrio ("position regarding the martyrdom") to be scrutinized by the Congregation. The positio, which relied heavily on San Vitores's beatification documentation, was completed in 1999.

Wanting to include young Asian laypersons in his first beatification for the Great Jubilee in 2000, Pope John Paul II paid particular attention to the cause of Calungsod. In January 2000, he approved the decree super martyrio ("concerning the martyrdom") of Calungsod, scheduling his beatification for March 5 of that year at Saint Peter's Square in Rome.

Regarding Calungsod's charitable works and virtuous deeds, John Paul II declared:

...From his childhood, Pedro Calungsod declared himself unwaveringly for Christ and responded generously to his call. Young people today can draw encouragement and strength from the example of Pedro, whose love of Jesus inspired him to devote his teenage years to teaching the faith as a lay catechist. Leaving family and friends behind, Pedro willingly accepted the challenge put to him by Fr. Diego de San Vitores to join him on the Mission to the Chamorros. In a spirit of faith, marked by strong Eucharistic and Marian devotion, Pedro undertook the demanding work asked of him and bravely faced the many obstacles and difficulties he met. In the face of imminent danger, Pedro would not forsake Fr. Diego, but as a "good soldier of Christ", preferred to die at the missionary's side.

== Sainthood ==
On December 19, 2011, the Holy See officially approved the miracle qualifying Calungsod for sainthood by the Roman Catholic Church. The recognized miracle dates from March 26, 2003, when a woman from Leyte, pronounced clinically dead two hours after a heart attack, was revived when an attending physician invoked Calungsod's intercession.

Cardinal Angelo Amato presided over the declaration ceremony on behalf of the Congregation for the Causes of Saints. He later revealed that Pope Benedict XVI had approved and signed the official promulgation decrees recognizing the miracles as authentic and worthy of belief. The College of Cardinals was then sent a dossier on the new saints, and they were asked to indicate their approval. On February 18, 2012, after the Consistory for the Creation of Cardinals, Amato formally petitioned the pope to announce the new saints' canonization. On October 21, 2012, Pope Benedict XVI canonized Calungsod in Saint Peter's Square. The pope wore papal vestments used only on special occasions. Cardinal Ricardo Jamin Vidal, the Archbishop Emeritus of Cebu, concelebrated at the canonization Mass.

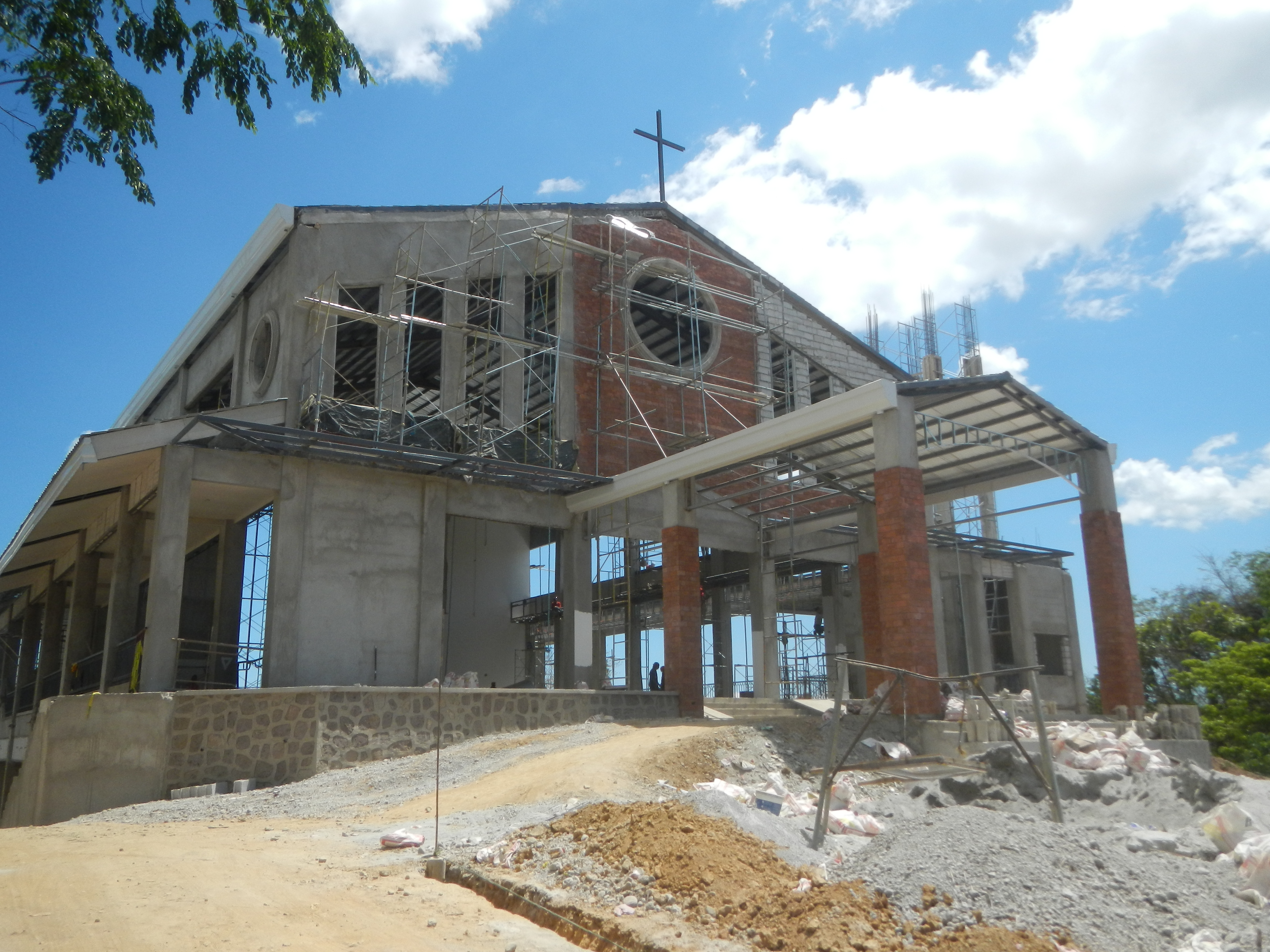
San Pedro Calungsod Parish and Sanctuary of St. Padre Pio, Antipolo

=== Relics ===
At his canonization Mass, Calungsod was the only saint without a first class relic exposed for veneration, as his body had been thrown into the sea and lost. The cutlass used to hack Calungsod's head and neck was retrieved from Guam by Vidal and is now venerated as a second-class relic. During the homily, Benedict XVI said that Calungsod received the Sacrament of Absolution from San Vitores before his death.

=== Feast day ===
After Lorenzo Ruiz of Manila, Calungsod is the second Filipino to be declared a saint by the Roman Catholic Church. His initial feast day was celebrated on April 2, his dies natalis (heavenly birthdate). In September 2024, his feast was transferred to October 21, the anniversary of his canonization. This is to avoid its occurrence in Holy Week or Eastertide, the new date was kept beginning in 2025.

Saturday is the designated weekday for devotions and novenas in his honor, as he was killed on a First Saturday.

== Birthplace issue ==
Various areas in the Visayan islands claim that Pedro Calungsod was born and raised there. Extensive research provided by the census research of Ginatilan, Cebu provided a longstanding record of Calonsor and Calungsod natives from their area, from which a strong claim had the most Calungsod natives originating since Filipino-Spanish era since the late 1700s. According to the Parish Pastoral Council William Pancho of Ginatilan, Cebu, there is a strong claim that in the mid-1600s, there were three Calungsod brothers:

- Valerio Calungsod, who migrated to Iloilo
- Casimiro Calungsod, who emigrated to Bohol
- Pablo Calungsod, who remained in Ginatilan, Cebu, and was the father of Pedro Calungsod.

In a public televised interview with ABS-CBN chief correspondent and newscaster Korina Sanchez, Cardinal Ricardo Jamin Vidal expressed his dismay that when the original beatification process of Pedro Calungsod began in the 1980s, no city except for Ginatilan, Cebu, was willing to come forward and claim credit for being Pedro's birthplace. Not surprisingly, however, when Pedro's canonization became official, Catholic bishops from the nearby provinces of Cebu, Bohol, Leyte, Samar, Iloilo and various Mindanao provinces suddenly came out of the woodwork, all laying claim to be the "official birthplace" of the newly minted saint.

As a result, Vidal ruled that he will not establish a definitive judgment on his birthplace since Spanish records only indicate the words "Pedro Calonsor, El Visayo" as his native description. Furthermore, he stated that all Visayan provinces were under the ecclesiastical jurisdiction of the Archdiocese of Cebu during the Filipino-Spanish era.

== Iconography ==
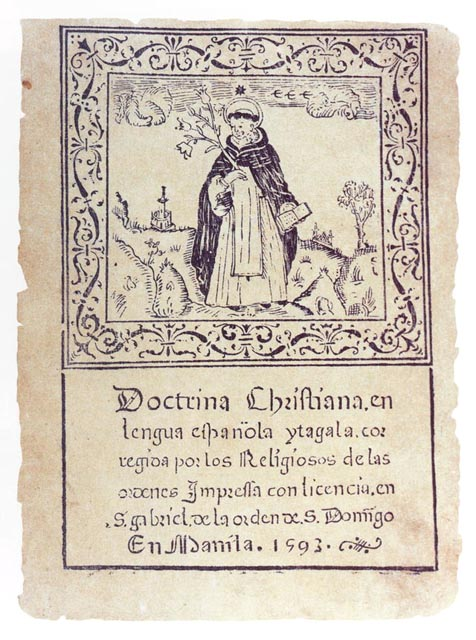
Among Calungsod's attributes is a Catechism book, often depicted as the Doctrina Christiana. Only known surviving copy by Fray Juan de Plasencia. Library of Congress, Washington, D.C. Circa 1590s.

It is not known what Calungsod looked like, as no contemporary depictions survive. The writer Alcina, who was a contemporary of Calungsod, described male Visayan indios of his time as usually more corpulent, better built, and somewhat taller than the Tagalogs in Luzon; that their skin was light brown; that their faces were usually round and of fine proportions; that their noses were flat; that their eyes and hair were black; that they – especially the youth – wore their hair a little bit longer; and that they already started to wear camisas (shirts) and calzones (knee-breeches). Pedro Chirino, S.J., who also worked in the Visayas in the 1590s, similarly described the Visayans as well-built, of pleasing countenance, and light-skinned.

Calungsod is often depicted as a teenaged young man wearing a camisa de chino that is sometimes bloodied and usually dark, loose trousers. His most famous attributes are the martyr's palm pressed to his chest and a catechism book, which artists often show as the Doctrina Christiana. He is depicted in mid-stride, occasionally also bearing a rosary or crucifix to indicate his missionary status. In some early statues, Calungsod is shown with a spear and catana (cutlass), the instruments of his death.

=== In art ===
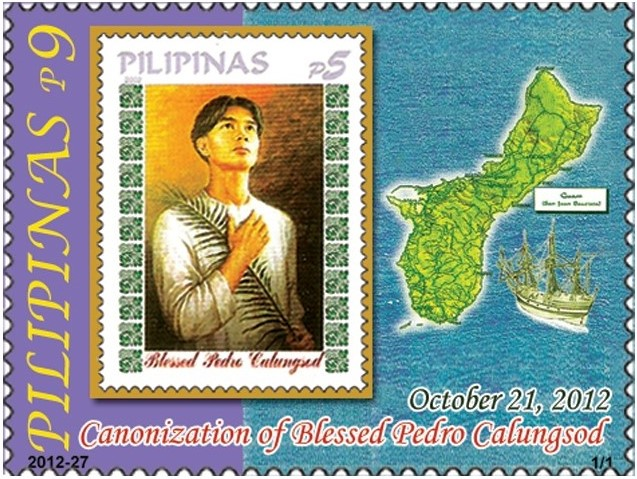
The saint as he appears on a 2012 Philippine postage stamp

The first portrayals stated to be of Pedro Calungsod were drawings made by Eduardo Castrillo in 1994 for the Heritage of Cebu Monument in Parián. A bronze statue representing Calungsod was made and forms part of the monument. Sculptors Francisco dela Victoria and Vicente Gulane of Cebu and Justino Cagayat Jr., of Paete, Laguna, created statues representing Calungsod in 1997 and 1999, respectively.

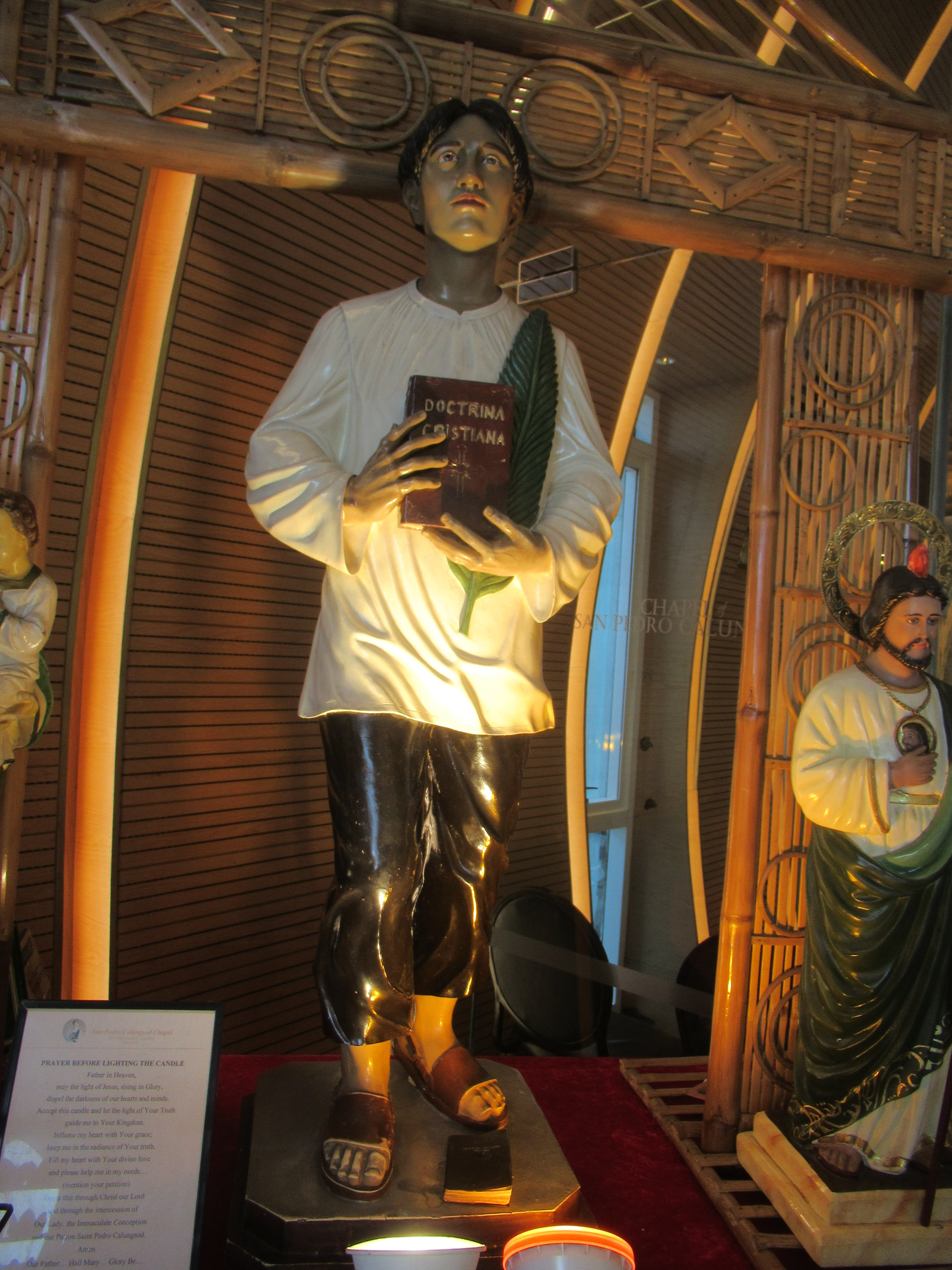
Calungsod in SM Aura chapel, dedicated to him.

When the Archdiocese of Manila in 1998 published the pamphlet Pedro Calungsod: Young Visayan "Proto-Martyr" by theologian Catalino Arevalo, SJ, the 17-year-old Ronald Tubid of Oton, Iloilo, then a student-athlete at the University of the East, was chosen to model for a portrait representing Calungsod. This was said to be the basis for Rafael del Casal's painting in 1999, which was chosen as the official portrait for Calungsod. This claim was denied by clergyman and book author Ildebrado Leyson, who asserted del Casal did not use an actual person as basis for the portrait. The del Casal image is the first to feature a Christogram, the Seal of the Society of Jesus, with which Calungsod was affiliated. The original painting is now enshrined at the Archdiocesan Shrine of Saint Pedro Calungsod in Cebu City.

Several statues representing Calungsod were also commissioned for the beatification, with one brought to Rome and personally blessed by Pope John Paul II. This became the "Pilgrim Image", now enshrined at the Archdiocesan Shrine of the Black Nazarene of the Society of the Angel of Peace in Cansojong, Talisay, Cebu. Another image was enshrined at the Archdiocesan Shrine of Saint Pedro Calungsod in Cebu City. Both images depict Calungsod wearing a white camisa (shirt) and trousers, with the martyr's palm, a rosary, and a crucifix pressed to his breast. During the novena before his feast day, a replica of the catana used to kill him is set into the arm of the statue.

For the canonization celebrations, the chosen sculpture by Justino Cagayat Jr., represented Calungsod in mid-stride and carrying the Doctrina Christiana and the martyr's palm pressed to his chest. This image was brought to Rome for the canonization festivities. Upon its return to the Philippines, the image toured the country. When not on tour, the image is enshrined at the Cebu Archdiocesan Shrine of Saint Pedro Calungsod in the archbishop's palace.

=== In film ===
Pedro Calungsod: Batang Martir is a Filipino film with Rocco Nacino in the title role released on December 25, 2013, as an official entry to the 2013 Metro Manila Film Festival. It was written and directed by Francis O. Villacorta and produced by HPI Synergy Group and Wings Entertainment.

== Criticism ==
While Calungsod remains venerated by many, he is also a figure criticised in indigenous Chamorro scholarly research, literature, and art. The controversy over his legacy in the Mariana Islands remains strong due to his major involvement in the colonization, forced conversions, and genocide of the islands’ indigenous Chamorro people and other related indigenous peoples.

=== Academic critiques ===
Vince Diaz focuses on San Vitores and his team, which includes Calungsod, and their legacy of alleged "mass destruction" among the Marianas' indigenous peoples in his book, Repositioning the Missionary.

Cynthia Ross Wiecko describes the missionaries as "agents of empire":

"Using the lens of ecological change brings Jesuits into a different perspective, one where it is difficult to see them as heroes. Although the socially disruptive effects of militarization and forced catholicization were immediately visible, the two forces also worked hand in hand to destroy ancient Chamorro settlements and profoundly disrupt land use patterns."

Wiecko also states:

"Population estimates ranged from 35,000 to 60,000, with an estimated total Chamorro population throughout the Marianas between 40,000 and 100,000. Introduced diseases—especially smallpox, influenza, and tuberculosis—contributed to most of the decline after 1668, but deaths from the Spanish-Chamorro Wars certainly played a role in the indigenous population's decline as well. Reflecting the devastating blows to Guam's native population, the first official Spanish census in 1710 indicated the Chamorro population to be 3,197. At that time, twenty percent of the population lived in and around Agaña, with the remaining population spread among the other reducción villages. By 1760, the total population numbered just 1,654 and later fell to only 1,318 in 1786. This was just a shadow of the once-thriving Chamorro society Europeans first encountered... The evidence here indicates that imperial dominance and catholicization shared similar roots of brutality, directly affecting changes in the landscape, settlement patterns, and land use. The combined effects of both fundamentally altered the island's people and environmental history."

Robert Haddock writes in A History of Health on Guam: ". . . as the Spanish eventually quelled the Chamorro rebellion, "peace" was established at the price of the extinction of a race."

Francis X. Hezel writes:

“ What began as a religious mission to proclaim the gospel of peace soon degenerated into an out-and-out war of military conquest which, as the histories have it, killed off vast numbers of native Chamorros before the missionaries were finally able to make believers out of the few survivors.” ("From Conversion to Conquest: The Early Spanish Mission in the Marianas", Journal of Pacific History, pp 115-137, 1982.)

Nicholas Goetzfridt states:

"A good non-action example would be the Spanish non-response to massive Chamorro depopulation. The first census of 1710 revealed that—although published interpretative variations eventually find middle ground in the 3,500 range—3,539 Chamorros (the most commonly cited number) remained out of early or pre-San Vitores ‘contact’ estimates ranging from as high as 100,000 to as low as 35,000 Chamorros living in the Mariana Islands. Regardless of the unrecoverable correct number, this figure represents a massive decline in the Chamorro population that went even further after the forced centralization of Chamorros onto Guam (with the exception of a few hundred “refugees” on Rota—Underwood 1973) and into the established, church-centered enclaves of Pago, Inapsan, Inarahan (Inarajan/Inalåhan), Merizo (Malesso’), Umatac (Humåtac), and Agat (Hågat) enforced by Joseph de Quiroga y Losada following his administrative destruction of many Chamorro villages after his 1680 arrival on Guam. By the 1758 full census, only 1,711 “native Indians” remained, along with 170 soldiers and 830 “Spanish & Filipinos.” This Spanish non-action is evident in the paucity of details concerning any Spanish effort to, if not stem the tide of this decline (often linked to an impending or even realized “extinction” of Chamorros), then render some form of medical response, particularly to the several epidemics and disease outbreaks that pepper the Spanish record. To find any reference to a Spanish effort on this front is to hold a wilting moment of history that cannot be extended into the context of Spain's centuries-long colonization of the Mariana Islands. And yet as scholarship has concerned itself with the chronological and interpretative “facts” of Guam's history, such a blatant gap in the telling of the Spanish colonial era—extending, of course, to the Northern Mariana Islands—has gone unaccounted for and has yet to materialize simply because it is not part of this regurgitated record."

== Places and things named after Calungsod ==
=== Churches ===
- Cebu Archdiocesan Shrine of Saint Pedro Calungsod, Archbishop's Residence Compound, 234 D. Jakosalem St., Cebu City
- Chapel of San Pedro Calungsod – SM Aura Premier, Bonifacio Global City, Taguig
- Parokya ni San Pedro Calunsod, Diyosesis ng Lucena – Brgy. Pury, San Antonio, Quezon
- San Pedro Calungsod Quasi Parish, Poblacion, Muntinlupa
- Chapel of San Pedro Calungsod, SM Seaside, South Road Properties, Cebu City
- San Pedro Calungsod Parish and Sanctuary of St. Padre Pio, Antipolo
- San Pedro Calungsod Parish, Sta. Catalina, Minalin, Pampanga
- San Pedro Calungsod Parish- Diocese of Surigao, Sta. Cruz, Placer, Surigao del Norte
- San Pedro Calungsod Parish, Cantabaco, Toledo City, Toledo City, Cebu
- San Pedro Calungsod Parish, Villa de Calamba, Calamba City
- San Pedro Calungsod Parish, Pulangbato, Cebu City
- San Pedro Calungsod Chapel, Pitogo, Taguig City

=== Films and theater ===
- 2013: Pedro Calungsod: Batang Martir
- 2014: "San Pedro Calungsod The Musical Stage Play"

=== Television ===
- Canonization Of Blessed Pedro Calungsod TV Special Coverage (PTV 4, 2012)
- San Pedro Calungsod: Ang Ikalawang Santo Documentary TV Special (ABS-CBN 2, 2013)

=== Educational institutions ===
- Academia de San Pedro Calungsod – Naga, Cebu
- St. Pedro Calungsod Academy (formerly Blessed Pedro Calungsod Academy) – Pasig
- San Pedro Calungsod Learning Center – Carmen, Cebu
- San Pedro Calungsod Mission School – Maribojoc, Bohol
- San Pedro Calungsod Montessori & Science School – San Pedro, Laguna
- San Pedro Calungsod Technical Vocational School, Inc. – Zamboanga

== See also ==
- List of Filipino Saints, Blesseds, and Servants of God
- Roman Catholicism in Guam
- Spanish-Chamorro Wars

== Bibliography ==
- Arevalo, Catalino. Pedro Calungsod, Young Visayan Proto-Martyr, Archdiocese of Manila Youth Ministry 1998, New edition from the Daughters of St. Paul, Manila 2000
- Leyson, Ildebrando Jesus. Pedro Calonsor Bisaya, Prospects of a Teenage Filipino, Cebu City, Claretian Publications 1999.
- Leyson, Ildebrando Jesus A. Pedro Calonsor Bissaya: Prospects of a Teenage Filipino. Second Edition. Cebu: Basic Graphics, 2000. ISBN 971-501-834-3
- Putzu, Fr. Salvatorre, "Pedro Calungsod, Young Catechist & Martyr", Second Edition, Manila, Word & Life Publications, Inc., 2012
- Bersales, Jose Eleazar Reynes, "San Pedro Calungsod: The Canonization Album," University Of San Carlos Press, Cebu, 2012
- Agualada Jr., Salvador G., "Pedro Calungsod: Patron for the Filipino Youth," Claretian Publications, Inc., Manila, 2012
- Orbeta, Ruben, "The Liturgical Cult of San Pedro Calungsod: a Filipino Response to the Universal Call to Holiness," STL University Of America, New York, 2019
