= Spanish–Chamorro Wars =

Era of civil unrest

| Date | 1670–1699 |
| Location | Mariana Islands (Guam and the Northern Mariana Islands) |
| Result | Spanish victory |

Belligerents
| Habsburg Spain; Pro-Spanish Chamorros | Anti-colonist Chamorros |

Commanders and leaders
| Diego Luis de San Vitores (1670–1672) †; Damián de Esplana (1674–1676); Antonio de Ayhi; Francisco de Irrisari (1676–1679); José de Quiroga y Losada (1679–1697) | Hurao (1670–1672) (executed); Matå'pang (1670–1680) (DOW); Agualin (1676–1679) †; Yura (1684) |

The Spanish–Chamorro Wars, also known as the Chamorro Wars and the Spanish–Chamorro War, refer to the late seventeenth century unrest among the Chamorros of the Mariana Islands in the western Pacific Ocean against the colonial effort of Habsburg Spain. The series of fighting erupted due to Spanish colonization, force-conversion of the Chamorro to Christianity by Spanish colonizers, and a brutal genocide conducted by the Spanish and their allies against the indigenous Chamorro people. Anger at proselytizing by the first permanent mission to Guam, which was led by Diego Luis de San Vitores and his team, including Pedro Calungsod, and a series of cultural misunderstandings led to increasing unrest on Guam and a Chamorro siege of the Hagåtña presidio incited by maga'låhi (Chief) Hurao in 1670. Maga'låhi Matå'pang killed San Vitores in 1672, resulting in a campaign of Spanish reprisal burnings of villages through 1676. Local anger at the attacks against villages resulted in another open rebellion led by Agualin and a second siege of Hagåtña. Governor Juan Antonio de Salas conducted a counter-insurgency campaign that successfully created a system of collaboration in which Guamanians turned in rebels and murderers and transferred most of the people from about 180 villages to seven towns, a policy known as reducción. By the early 1680s, Guam was largely "reduced," or pacified.

With Guam in hand, the Spaniards looked to extend control to the Northern Mariana Islands. First was Rota, where the Spanish forces led by José de Quiroga y Losada conducted a quick military campaign in 1680, followed by the villagization of the Rota population into two towns in 1682. The Spaniards were welcomed on Tinian but were forced to conduct a campaign on Saipan against armed resistance. After successfully crushing rebellious villages on Saipan, the force under Quiroga began constructing a fort to solidify control of the area. However, with most of the Spanish soldiers in the north, Guam had erupted into rebellion. Yula led a sneak attack upon the Hagåtña presido on July 13, 1683, killing the Jesuit mission superior, severely wounding Governor Damián de Esplana, and killing four soldiers before they were repelled. A larger force of hostile Chamorros then returned to begin the third siege of Hagåtña. Meanwhile, the warriors from Tinian and Saipan had combined forces to attack the force commanded by Quiroga on Saipan, who was forced to shelter in his partially constructed fort. Quiroga was sieged until November when he was able to escape and sail to Guam, where he lifted the siege of Hagåtña. The Spanish then conducted a series of campaigns against resisting villages on Guam and executing insurrectionists until a new peace was secured.

The Spaniards did not attempt to control the northern islands again until 1694, when Quiroga captured Saipan but faced an entrenched defense by the population of Tinian, who had taken shelter on Aguijan. Upon winning the battle, Quiroga ordered that the population of Tinian be relocated to Guam. While some disobeyed and fled to the islands of the far north, Tinian was soon emptied. The final stage was a 1698 military expedition against the eight small islands at northern end of the Marianas. The population there was resettled on Guam in 1699, completing the villagization of rebellious populations and Spanish consolidation of the Marianas.

== Background ==
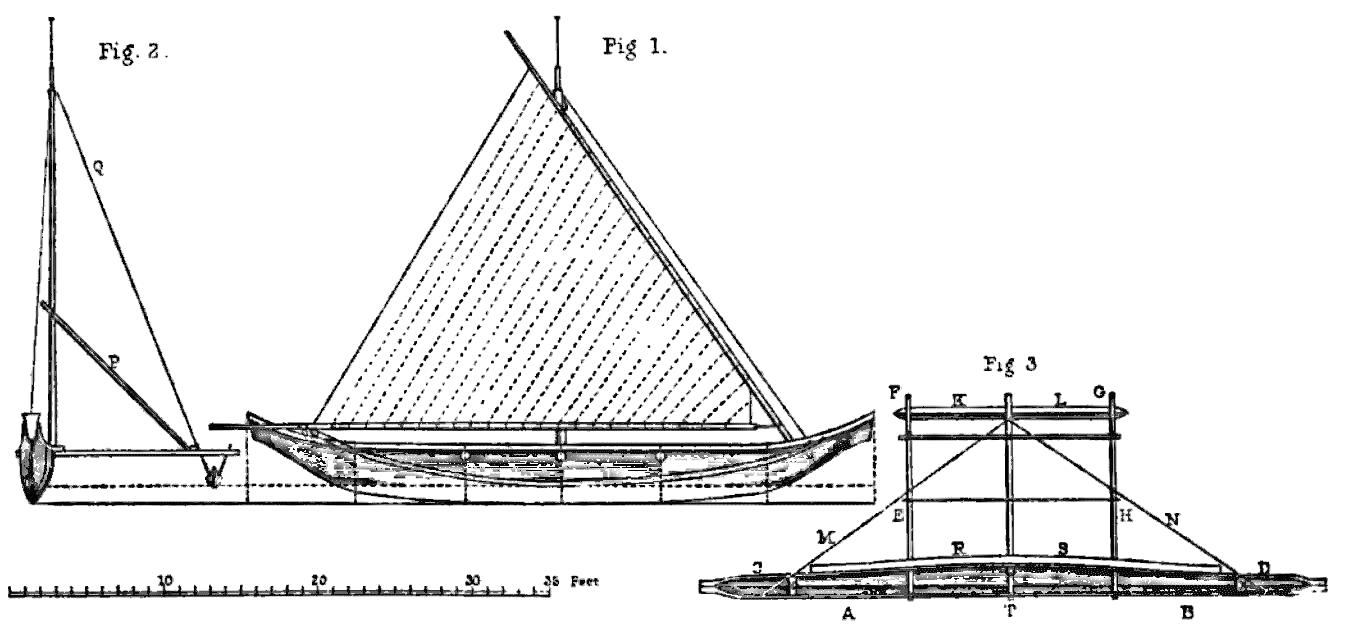
A 1742 diagram of a 40-foot sakman, a fast sailing outrigger boat used by pre-Contact Chamorros for inter-island travel

The ancient Chamorros were organized into matrilineal extended family groups, stratified into three hierarchical classes. Chamorro seamanship and the sakman, also known as the "flying proa," impressed the first Spanish sailors to the Marianas. A 1668 description reported that there were approximately 180 autonomous villages on Guam with a total island population between 35,000 and 50,000. There is very little archaeological evidence for warfare among the ancient Chamorros. While some inland latte stone structures were located along ridge tops that allowed easy spotting of approaching warriors, it is not clear they were placed there for defense or simply because they were along footpaths. For weapons, ancient Chamorros favored the sling and, for melee, spears tipped with fire-hardened or barbed tips made from human shinbone that often caused infections in those wounded. Armor consisted of palm leaf mats placed on the head and chest on the otherwise naked body. Boys and young men competed in challenges with the sling and spear. Early European reports describe Chamorro warfare as highly disorganized, small scale, and triggered by minor disputes such as cut food trees. Battles typically lasted until the first death, whereupon the killer's family would offer a turtle shell or other items of value to the family of the warrior that died to reestablish peace.

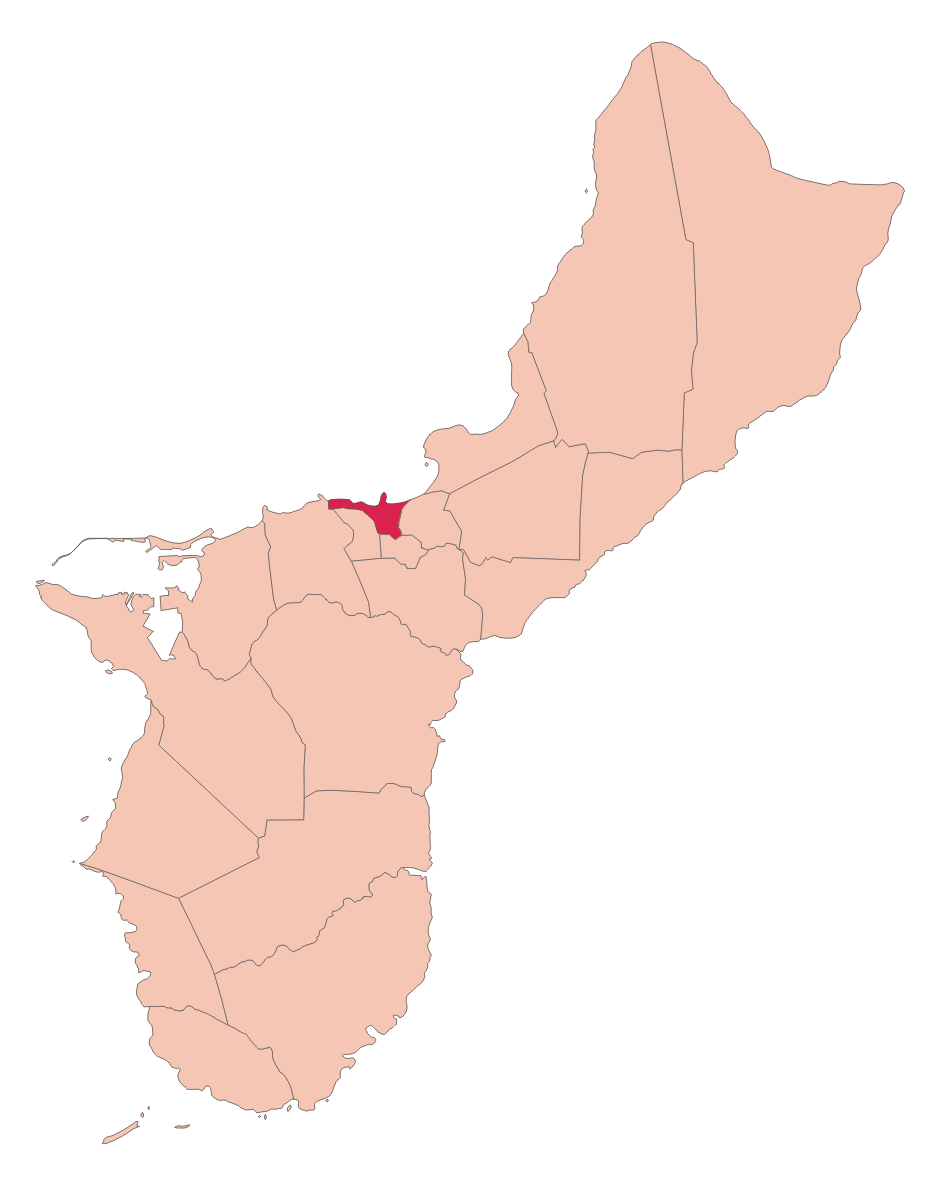
The village of Hagåtña is along the leeward central coast of Guam

The Marianas were the first islands in the Pacific reached by Ferdinand Magellan in 1521, though it was not until 1565 that Miguel López de Legazpi formally declared Spanish sovereignty over the Mariana Islands. Following Legazpi's visit, Guam became a provisioning stop for the lucrative Manila galleons trade between Acapulco and Manila, which carried silver from New Spain to trade for silk and porcelain from China. However, Guam was a minor piece of the vast Spanish Empire and few galleons even made port, as they were content to furl their sails offshore long enough to trade for water and food with Chamorros who came out on their sakman.

A permanent Spanish presence was not established until June 15, 1668, when Father Diego Luis de San Vitores landed at the village of Hagåtña, in charge of a force of 31, including five other Jesuit missionaries. Few of the Spanish force were skilled with the firearms they brought, as San Vitores had been impressed by the gentleness and peacefulness of the Chamorros in an earlier visit. He argued that bringing experienced soldiers would create more conflict: "Experience has shown that soldiers do not content themselves with defense of the preachers but commit depredations." Upon arrival, local chiefs competed for the mission to come to their villages. Chief Kepuha of Hagåtña threw a feast the following day where the Spanish gave all the local chiefs iron hoops in exchange for food. The missionaries baptized 23 islanders, mostly young children. The mission established its headquarters in Hagåtña, consisting of a grouping of structures, including the precursor to the Dulce Nombre de Maria Cathedral Basilica. San Vitores refused to allow a palisade or other fortification, as contrary to the mission's gospel of peace. In January 1669, the first stone and lime church was dedicated in Hagåtña, followed by the opening of a boy's elementary school, the first formal institution for education to be established in the Pacific.

A few days after arriving, the first confrontation occurred when a spear-wielding Chamorro threatened a Mexican mission helper who was attempting to destroy a shrine of ancestral skulls, under the orders of the priests. While the Spaniards did not bother themselves with recording the religious beliefs of Chamorros, scholars assume that their belief system was similar to other islanders in being largely based upon providing offerings to a protective ancestor spirit to gain its help. Chamorros would occasionally consult a makana, who were believed to be skilled intermediaries with guardian spirits. As well as destroying skull shrines, the Spaniards' religious aims explicitly undermined the authority of the makanas, whom the Spaniards called "sorcerers".

== "Poison waters" ==
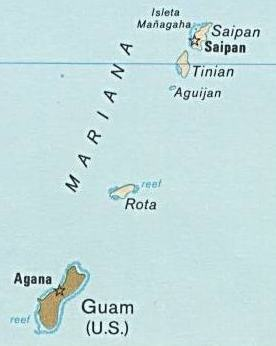
The southern islands of the Mariana Islands archipelago. The distance between Guam and Saipan is about 135 miles (218 km)

The first violence against the mission was an August 1668 violent attack against missionary Fr. Morales on Tinian, who was ambushed and speared in the leg as he went to baptize a dying man. Five days later, two of the men accompanying Fr. Morales were killed when Chamorros transporting them on sakmans suddenly attacked them with machetes. On Guam, Fr. Luis de Medina was badly beaten when visiting one of the remote villages on Guam. The missionaries found that distant villages on Guam that had previous welcomed them were concealing paths with brush, refusing to give them the traditional welcoming food of breadfruit, and even meeting them armed.

The Spaniards blamed the hostility on rumors spread by a Chinese castaway named Choco on Saipan that the waters that the missionaries were using for baptism was poisoned. This story was plausible to those villages whose sole contact with the missionaries was the baptisms conducted on the deathly ill or newborn, who experience high mortality. Contemporary Spanish accounts state that Chamorros in areas that regularly interacted with the mission group, such as Hagåtña, did not appear to give credence to these stories.

This violence made San Vitores reconsider his opposition to armed force. He sent to letter to the Philippines asking for 200 additional men, this time equipped with weapons, as well as asking that Manila galleons stopping by be prepared "to carry out punishment and remedy whatever misfortunes might occur." In late 1669, San Vitores led a dozen armed members of his mission, as well as some Chamorro converts, to Tinian in an attempt to stop a war between two villages that threatened to destabilize the missionary efforts there. When one of the warring groups made a surprise attack on the mission party, three were killed by a small artillery piece. For the first time, the Spanish force directly killed Chamorros.

In early 1670, Fr. Medina and his catechist Hipolito de la Cruz were killed by a group of young men on Saipan as they prepared to baptize a sick child. Then, in July 1671, a Mexican mission helper in Hagatña was killed when he went outside the village to cut wood to make crosses. Spaniards arrested suspected murderers, accidentally killing a Chamorro noble. While the Spaniards intended to hold a fair trial, the concept was not understood by the Chamorros. One historian writes: "the barbarians were so greatly offended by justice, to which they were strangers, that they behaved as if they would rather be killed without trial than be arrested and examined."

== First siege of Hagatña (1670) ==
The outrage at the trial combined with the anger at the attempts to destroy ancestral shrines and undermine makanas to move the residents of Hagatña to open resistance. Hurao, a high-caste resident of the village, began to rally villagers to open resistance. In response to the threat, the Spaniards finally erected a wooden stockade with two towers. They were soon confronted by an estimated 2,000 Chamorro men, though the Spaniards quickly captured Hurao. While the military head of the mission, Juan de Santa Cruz, favored an attack, San Vitores insisted on trying to appease the attackers with gifts of food and turtle shell. The besieging Chamorros conducted themselves largely by the norms of ritualized island warfare, characterized by ceremonial posturing, displays of physical prowess, and the avoidance of an all-out battle that might result in heavy casualties. After a month, a severe typhoon ended the siege, inflicting more casualties than the battle. During the entire course of the siege, Chamorros lost five men. This is compared to the eight Chamorro deaths from warfare recorded by the Spaniards in the previous three years, indicating that the siege was abnormally bloody by the standards of traditional Chamorro warfare.

In the five months after the lifting of the siege, San Vitores requested more troops and redoubled his missionary efforts towards the northern islands. However, San Vitores appeared to believe that the mere presence of additional soldiers would ensure peace. The Spaniards did not make any efforts to punish or detain those responsible for the attacks on missionaries or siege of Hagatña. Released from prison, Hurao began traveling between villages to encourage opposition to the colonists.

== Death of San Vitores (1672) ==
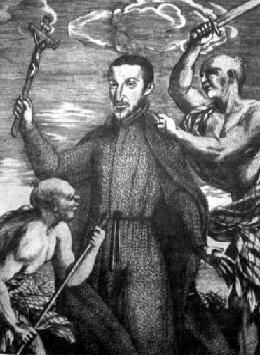
A 1686 depiction of the murder of Diego Luis de San Vitores by Matå'pang (right) and Hurao (left)

In March 1672, a young Mexican member of the mission, Diego Bazan, was killed in Chochogo, an inland village that was a center of anti-Spanish resistance. The next day, two Filipino catechists and their Spanish soldier escort were also ambushed and killed in Chocogo. A few days later, San Vitores, who had been in the southern village of Nisichan overseeing the construction of church began returning to Hagåtña. On the way, he and his Filipino catechist Pedro Calungsod stopped in the village of Tumon to look for a mission helper who had fled at word of the new violence. In Tumon, San Vitores met Matå'pang, a local elder whom San Vitores had converted after nursing him to health from a serious illness, but had since turned away from the Spaniards. Infuriated at San Vitores' offer to baptize his daughter, Matå'pang said that San Vitores would do better to baptize the ancestral skull in the house and stop killing children and that if the Jesuit did not leave immediately, he would kill San Vitores. When Matå'pang left to get weapons and more men, San Vitores entered the house and baptized the girl. San Vitores and Calungsod were caught by the enraged Matå'pang and his companion, by legend Hurao. Calungsod was killed first, followed soon afterward by San Vitores, whose skull was split by a sword and heart pierced by a spear.

In response, the Spaniards launched a punitive attack on Tumon, burning several houses and sakmans. However, the Spanish column was attacked on both flanks as it waded through the waters of Tumon Bay, losing three soldiers to poison spears. Two Chamorro dead were counted. A month later, Hurao was captured and executed by one of the Spanish militia.

Fr. Francisco Solano, the Jesuit who became head of the mission after San Vitores' death, continued conciliatory policies, partially from awareness of the mission's weakness. Of the 31 original mission helpers, only 21 remained and there were only 13 muskets. Solano was concerned that if hostile Chamorros realized how inaccurate the muskets were, they would overwhelm the mission. He forbade mission personnel from visiting the north of Guam, which had become dangerously hostile, and there were even concerns that southern villages would turn away. Two more Filipinos were killed on Rota, the island just north of Guam, about a month later. Solano then succumbed to tuberculosis, only two months after the death of San Vitores.

== Spanish reprisals (1674–1676) ==
Topographical map of Guam, which is characterized by volcanic hills in the south and a limestone plateau in the north

Following the turmoil of 1672, the year 1673 was relatively peaceful. However, in February 1674, Fr. Francisco Ezquerra and five of his six companions were killed while walking from Umatac to Fuuna, a village near Orote Point. Spanish forces turned in June 1674, when the Manila galleon that visited the island left behind Damián de Esplana, a trained military officer with 23 years of military service in Colonial Chile, who was originally bound for the Philippines. Esplana was immediately put in charge of the garrison of 21 militia.

Unlike the Jesuit Superiors before him, Esplana believed that "for the good of the Christian community it was necessary to give an example of punishment that would warn the barbarians, whom mildness only made more bold." As his first example, Esplana threatened the people of Chochogo, a center of anti-Spanish resistance, unless it allowed free access to mission personnel. The Chamorros refused and Esplana ordered a night attack with orders to kill any men who resisted. The Spaniards recorded that several men were killed, as well as one woman in the nighttime confusion. Two weeks later, the Spaniards attacked Chochogo, burning its houses, destroying many spears, and killing two Chamorros. In November 1674, Esplana led an expedition to Tumon, where villagers were refusing to participate in any Christian programs. Finding the village deserted, he caught up to a fleeing sakman, killing a man who had killed a mission assistant a couple years earlier. The dead man he ordered dismembered and hung between two poles as a warning to other resisting Chamorros.

In January 1675, Esplana attacked to the north of Guam, burning the resisting villages of Sidia and Ati. One historian further states that Esplana "threw down a steep slope several natives who tried to impede his passage." Esplana joined with the allied forces of Chief Antonio Ayhi to destroy Sagua, whose villagers had previously killed one of the Jesuits. Esplana continued to the south, burning the villages of Nagan and Hinca, which had been involved in the death of another Jesuit. Chamorros attempted to ambush the Spaniards as they approached Tachuch, near Merizo, but Esplana killed one Chamorro and then captured and executed the chief of Tachuch as a warning to others who might resist. The Jesuits were full of praise for their new military commander, who was seen as the savior of the mission. As well as a new commander, 20 additional Spanish troops arrived on Guam in 1675.

In December 1675, a Jesuit priest and two lay mission assistant were killed at Ritidian after reprimanding a group of young men who attempted to enter into a girls' dormitory. The men subsequently burned all the mission buildings in the village. Spanish accounts indicate that the older villagers disapproved of the attack but were unable to prevent it.

The following month, another Jesuit priest was killed in Upi by a Chamorro man who accused him of cheating him in a trade. In response, the villagers of nearby Tarragui, who had been close to the priest, organized an armed force and challenged Upi to a battle. Meeting no resistance, they burned the killer's home and recovered the priest's body for burial.

Both incidents in northern Guam appear to have stemmed from personal disputes or disagreements. The second incident also documents a disagreement between Chamorro communities, with villagers from Tarragui taking action against a man from Upi.

In June 1676, Francisco de Irrisari arrived on Guam and became the first person to take the title of Governor of the Mariana Islands, replacing both Esplana as military commander and the mission for civil matters as he formalized complete authority. He also arrived with fourteen additional soldiers, bringing the garrison to over 50 men. Irrisari continued Esplana's tactics, marching on Talisay, a village inland from Agat, and conducting a daylight attack that killed five people. A few weeks later, the garrison had to put down a revolt in Orote that was incited when a Chamorro girl who attended a mission school and had converted to Christianity married one of the Spanish militia against the wishes of her father. Irrisari hanged the father of the girl as punishment for incitement and brought the new couple back to Hagatña for safety.

== Second siege of Hagatña (1676–1677) ==
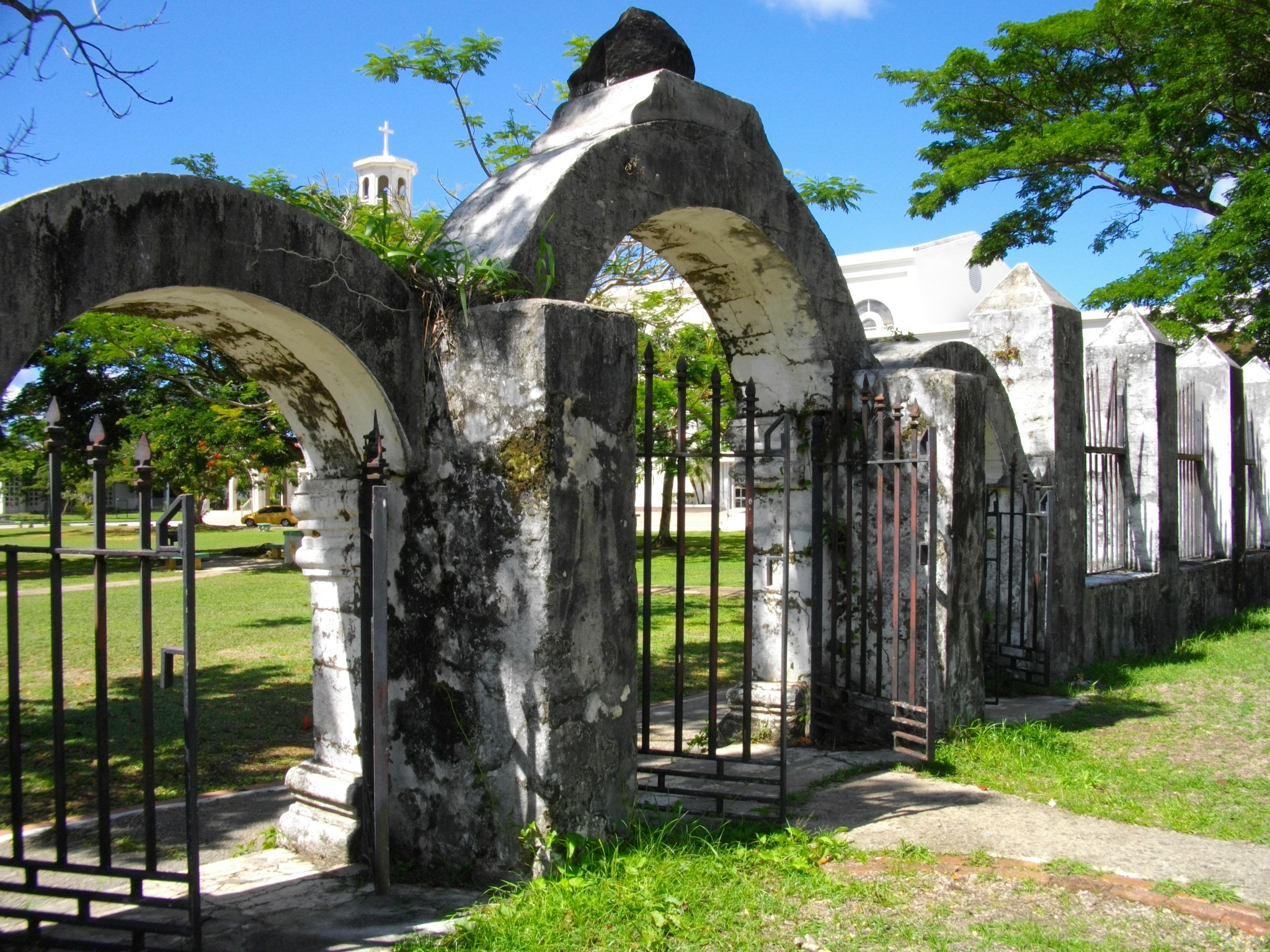
The 2010 ruins of the walled Plaza de España in Hagåtña, the precursor of which was the presidio protecting San Vitores's chapel and mission buildings

By this time, the Spanish attacks against villages had become the main cause of grievance among anti-Spanish Chamorros. In the late summer of 1676, Agualin, a blind high-caste Chamorro from Hagåtña, began traveling around Guam to rally resistance, like Hurao five years before him. As well as the old stories of killing children, Agualin said that the Spaniards were turning children against those resisting the Spaniards and, by their opposition to bachelors' houses, were "depriv[ing] parents of the good price they would have received for the services of their daughters in these houses. Instead, they seek to marry off the girls to their own mission helpers or soldiers." Agualin also stated that the mission demanded that Chamorros attend religious services when they would rather be working, asking, "What death is worse than the life we are forced to live?" He called for uniting of all villages to cut off the Spanish soldiers' survival and eliminate the Spanish from the islands.

Around this time, Antonio Ayhi became known as the most pro-Spanish of the chiefs. Ayhi ensured the loyalty of this village, while attempting to prohibit anti-Spanish Chamorros from passing through. Other pro-Spanish chiefs included Ignacio Hineti of Sinajana and Alonso So'on of Agat, who led battalions in support of Spanish attacks on hostile villages. By this time, at least four villages on Guam had mission schools, whose students were often fiercely loyal to the Spaniards. The militia had also begun marrying Chamorro women, further increasing the number of Chamorros with personal ties to the mission.

In late August 1676, Chamorro resisters set fire to the church and mission quarters at Ayra'an. A force led by Irrisari responded, leaving eight soldier to protect missionaries at Orote before returning to Hagåtña. A week later, as the pastor of Orote and the soldiers were leaving for Hagåtña, they were attacked by a large force of armed men. Suddenly, a local man named Cheref appeared and offered to take the Spaniards away to safety in his sakman. After the Spaniards had boarded the sakmanwas well away from shore, Cheref and his men overturned the boat and attacked the Spaniards with spears and clubs. This incident would raise uncertainty about who among the Chamorros could be trusted.

In response, the Spaniards reinforced walls of the Hagåtña presidio, construction new sentry stations and changing the layout of buildings to improve security. Antonio Ayhi arrived with a force to assist in the defense, but the Spaniards advised him to leave for fear of repercussions to his village. In mid-October 1676, Agualin led to a force of 1,500 men to the presidio, which was defended by 40 Spanish militia equipped with 18 muskets. The siege largely followed the form of the first siege: the Chamorros ritualistically lined up outside musket range to taunt their foe. The Spaniards periodically sallied forth, killing one or two Chamorros before the besieging force fled to the hills, only to return and reestablish the siege. The Chamorros destroyed a cornfield that fed the mission, but the Spaniards managed to grow enough crops within the stockade to survive. The defenders easily fended off the half-hearted attempts to storm the presidio, until January 1677, when the besieging Chamorro force disbanded and left. Agualin eluded the Spaniards until 1679, when he was recognized while landing a sakman and killed. During the siege, Antonio Ayhi and other pro-Spanish leaders attempted to bring food to the besieged mission.

== Spanish suppression (1678) ==
In June 1678, the new governor, Juan Antonio de Salas arrived with thirty additional soldiers, and immediately restarted the violent suppression of resisting villages. Salas assaulted the villages of Apoto and Tupalao, burning them to the ground, killing two, and taking two children for enrollment in the mission school in Hagåtña. The Spanish force met resistance at Fuuna, killing an unrecorded number of men before torching the homes. Salas continued to Orote and Sumay, both hotbeds of anti-Spanish resistance, torching both before proceeding to Talofofo and Picpuc.

In their campaign, the Spaniards informed the populace that Chamorros would turn over any murderers or rebels, that anyone sheltering a murder or rebel would be hanged. If these rules were not obeyed, the village would be collectively punished. Adherence to these new rules would be rewarded by special recognition and titles and a badge of authority, which was very attractive to the Chamorros as their traditional culture used similar status signifiers. Often, the Spaniards would designate someone as captain of the village police, giving them a wooden staff, and encourage the new captain to deputize men he trusted as corporals, in effect creating a police force that mirrored the Spanish military structure. These village forces were then expected to assist in suppressing revolts in other villages. The Jesuits recorded that Chamorros readily accepted the rules because some hoped "to ingratiate themselves with the Spaniards, others to achieve pardon for their crimes, and all of them hoping for a reward."

These new incentives soon resulted in the turning in of dozens of the desired "criminals", sometimes killing them before turning in their heads as proof. In January 1679, Ignacio Hinete killed three people in Tarragui who had been involved in earlier unrest. Hinete notified Salas to send someone to pick up the heads so they could be impaled on the wall of the presido as a warning to others. People in villages around Guam presented the heads of those who had murdered priests, or turned them over for public execution by the Spaniards. In April 1680, the people of Rota sent the body of Matå'pang, where he had been hiding, in the hopes of avoiding Spanish punishment. The Chamorro resistance was largely broken and its remnants went into deep hiding.

== Pacification of Guam (1680–1681) ==
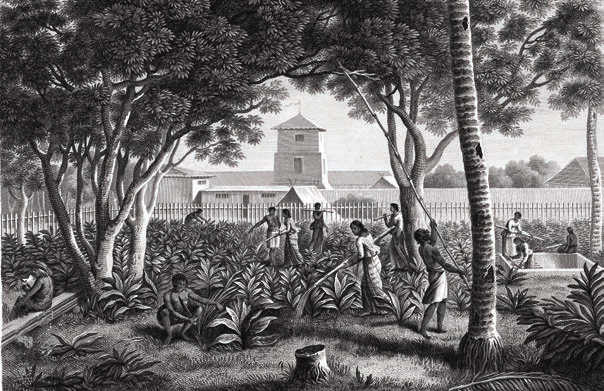
Women tending gardens outside the government center in Hagåtña, 19th century

In June 1680, a Jesuit wrote that Guam had been "quiet for more than a year," but that priests needed armed escorts for safety and to ensure compliance: "The mission is so dependant upon arms that without them nothing can be done, because the local people pay little attention to the Fathers when they are alone. The people here respond only to fear." In late 1679, two priests accompanied by 40 Spanish troops and 40 armed Chamorro allies left Hagåtña to travel to villages that had not seen a Spanish visitor since the hostilities of 1676. Everywhere they went the Spanish burned the houses for young men, destroyed the skulls of ancestors and spears, baptized children, and selected children to attend the mission school in Hagåtña. Many villages were abandoned by residents who feared the column was inflicting more retribution, but in most cases were lured back by promises of safety. The Spanish were welcomed in towns such as Tarragui and Ritidian. Some villages, such as Hanum, refused to submit and the Spanish burned some houses in retaliation.

The Jesuits were pleased by the pro-Spanish and pro-Christian change in attitudes. In Orote, the body of a man hanged for insurrection was dragged by small children who pelted the corpse with stones while shouting, "Die, dog, die. You refused to be a Christian." Most inhabitants of the island were attending church and regularly bringing children for baptism and bodies for burial, which had been a major source of tension in 1670. The church in Hagåtña was moved outside of the presidio walls and build to accommodate 1,000 parishioners. Further, the Spaniards had largely succeeded in consolidating the population. The residents on seven rural villages near Hagåtña were convinced to settle within a couple miles of garrison, creating the barrios of Sinajana, Anigua, and Santa Cruz (now part of East Hagåtña). The entire town center was enclosed in a wall, first wood but rebuild with stone, with two gates facing the sea and interior hills. Outside of Hagåtña, the Spanish policy of reducción concentrated Chamorros in six towns of about 1,000 residents each: Pago, Agat, Inarajan, Umatac, Inapsan, and Mapupun. These towns each had a church and were being built in orderly rows at Spanish direction. Still, the Spaniards burnt houses outside these villages to discourage unauthorized settlement, thereby creating the lanchu system that became typical of Chamorro society, in which people lived in towns but worked on remote ranches. The concentration of the population in larger settlements appears to have accelerated the spread of deadly foreign diseases, with 917 deaths being recorded from 1680 to 1683 on Guam and Rota, compared to about twenty Chamorro deaths from hostilities in the same period.

Salas unexpectedly left in 1680, leaving José de Quiroga y Losada, a junior military officer in command of the island. Fortunately, a year passed without much incident and Antonio de Saravia arrived in June 1681. Unlike his predecessors, Saravia's appointment as governor was made by the King of Spain, so Guam was no longer subordinate to rule from the Philippines or Mexico. As the first official governor, Saravia appointed Antonio Ayhi as lieutenant-governor of the colony and gave him the title maestre-de-campo, roughly the equivalent of a colonel. Ayhi then convinced the other major village chiefs to take the oaths of fealty given by Saravia on September 8, 1681. These chiefs were then deputized to represent the governor in regions around the island, and were subsequently tasked with being mayors and other officials for the Spanish administration. Saravia built new roads, taught new trades, and introduced new livestock, such as chicken and cattle.

A significant problem of the Spaniards was the conduct of the garrison. Since the arrival of Esplana, the soldiers had begun operating independently of the Jesuits. Meanwhile, the new recruits were often not well trained and, in the worst cases, criminals who had been given the choice of military duty on Guam or a prison in the Philippines. While the garrison had expanded to 115 in 1680, there was only pay for 40 soldiers, meaning that each soldier was making a third of their expected salary. This resulted in low morale, attempts to find money by whatever means possible, and general indiscipline. While the Jesuits had been grateful for the additional soldiers in the early hostilities, they became increasingly appalled by the soldiers behavior. By 1680, soldiers had moved on from seducing girls at the mission school to raping village women. One Jesuit in 1680 wrote, "The thefts that the soldiers have carried out among the Indians, and the other extortions, have been endless." Chamorro anger at the depredations of the garrison only grew over the years.

== Rota pacified (1680–1682) ==
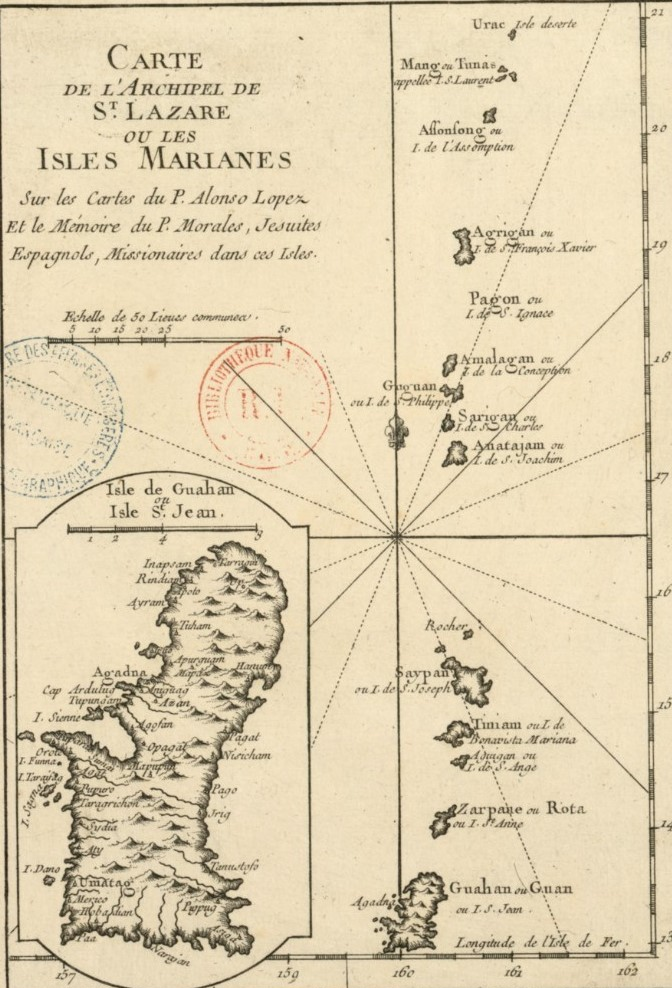
1764 map of the Mariana Islands

With Guam pacified, the Spaniards turned their attention to control of the northern islands. In late 1680, Quiroga led a force to Rota. He captured several rebel leaders, who were later executed, and sent up to 150 refugees from Guam who had fled the unrest back home. In April 1681, rebels from Inapsan who had burnt down their church and rectory fled to Rota. They were followed by Quiroga who, with local assistance, drove the rebels into the hills until most of them surrendered.

The Spaniards then proceeded with the reduction of Rota, on the model of that already completed on Guam. In March 1682, a church and rectory was constructed at Sosa (modern day Songsong), and then a second town at Agusan. The population was then largely concentrated in these two towns. However, there was still resistance. A spear was thrown at the door of the Sosa rectory while the church in Agusan was burnt twice during the year. However, the Agusan priest was confident about his victory: "The dead receive Christian burial, and the sick are brought to the church for the sacraments on the shoulders of relatives."

With Rota firmly under their control, the Spaniards looked further north. In early 1682, the mission superior, Fr. Manuel Solorzano, took a military escort on a trip north. On Tinian and Aguigan, Solorzano baptized 300 infants. However, his party was nearly ambushed on Saipan and achieved little on the island before being forced to turn back to Guam because of unfavorable winds. Twice in 1683, Saravia tried to lead Jesuit missions north but the two boats used by the Spaniards were unable to brave rough weather.

== Final large-scale resistance (1683) ==
When Governor Saravia died in November 1683, Damián de Esplana, who had returned to Guam only a few months earlier, presented sealed orders appointing him the next governor. Esplana immediately ordered Quiroga north to conquer Tinian and Saipan. In March 1684, Quiroga's force of 76 Spanish soldiers and at least as many Chamorro allies left Hagåtña. They were welcomed on Tinian but encountered strong resistance at Saipan. Dozens of sakmans prevented an easy landing. One or two Saipanese warriors and a Spanish soldier was killed before forcing the local Chamorros to flee inland. Pushing northward, the Spaniards burnt the minority of villages that still resisted. A Jesuit writes that one resister "was cut down with an axe and his body hung by the foot from a tree to inspire fear." The force then crossed the island and pushed southward. Only the village of Araiao put up significant resistance, but their warriors were soon routed and the Spaniards claimed the head of one of the leaders. The campaign ended, Quiroga sent 25 soldiers to force submission of the sparsely populated islands further north while he began constructing a fort on Saipan.

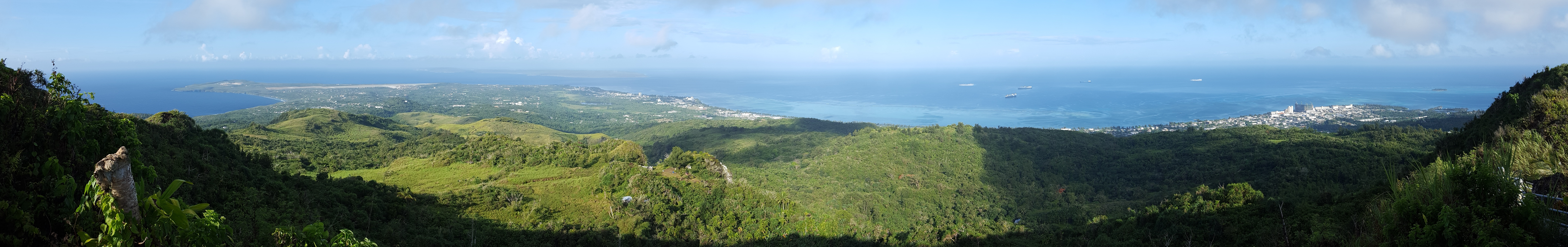
Southwestern Saipan from Mount Tapochau. Tinian is faintly visible across the Saipan Channel.

However, the reduced garrison in Hagåtña tempted the rebels still on Guam. Chief Yula (Yura) of Apurguan, near Tamuning, rallied other resisters, starting in Ritidian and Pago. News of the rebellion spread quickly. By chance, most of the village priests were on their way to Hagåtña for a meeting and avoided being caught in the uprising. The exception was the priest of Ritidian, who was slain at the command of a chief who was angry that the priest had insisted that his daughter be married in a church. However, many Chamorros on Guam sided with the Spaniards. The rebels tried to convince Ignacio Hineti to join them, but he refused. The boys attending mission school often sided with the priests and garrison.

On July 13, 1683, Yula and about 40 others concealed weapons as they infiltrated the presidio while pretending to attend mass. They killed the guards, left an injured Esplana for dead, and killed two Jesuit priests. The attackers repeatedly stabbed Fr. Solorzano, the mission superior, and severed his hand before a Chamorro mission helper who sided with Yula cut the priest's throat with a knife. Boarding students from the mission school killed one attacker with knives. In total, four Spanish soldiers were killed and 17 badly wounded, but they managed to kill Yula and drive away the rebels.

An even larger force of rebels returned a few days later to attempt to take the presidio but were met defenders reinforced by Ignacio Hineti and his allied Chamorros. Hineti killed the new leader of the rebellion, placing his head on a post. However, the attackers managed to burn the church and rectory and threatened to swarm the walls. The Jesuits armed themselves to defend the stockade, eventually forcing the attackers to withdraw by sakman, where they incited Chamorros both on Guam and in the northern islands to join the rebellion. The two Jesuits based on Rota were killed, one when he landed in Tinian while attempting to warn Quiroga of the uprising and the other on Rota from rebels who had sailed from Tinian.

On Saipan, Quiroga was unaware of the rebellion until the seventeen soldiers he had left on Tinian were killed and their boats burnt. A combined force of Chamorro warriors from Tinian and Saipan launched an attack, driving Quiroga's force into the unfinished fort. Rallying, his counterattack forced the enemy to flee. However, the rebels soon returned, sieging the fort for weeks and making three determined charges in an attempt to breach Spanish lines. Quiroga lost four soldiers in the fighting, while the Chamorro had "considerable losses." At this point, the Spanish force numbered 35, from the original 75 that had begun their campaign. Quiroga eventually was able to sneak down to the shore and take sakmans back to Guam in November 1683.

The third siege of Hagåtña had lasted for four months when Quiroga arrived. There had been intense fighting in late July and August and at least five Filipino soldiers who had married Chamorro women had deserted. The injured Governor Espana had become indecisive and it was likely only because of the support of the pro-Spanish Chamorro militia that the garrison had held out against the far larger besieging force. However, Quiroga had a fearsome reputation and the rebels abandoned the siege at his arrival. For months afterwards, Quiroga pursued the rebels, burning more villages and executing prisoners, until an exhausted peace was once again established. The latest spasm of violence resulted in the loss of about a third of the Spanish garrison, between 45 and 50, and perhaps 30 or 35 losses among the Chamorro rebels.

== Final reduction ==
Esplana grew violently paranoid after being nearly killed in 1684. He ordered soldiers to "shoot at sight any enemy islander", resulting in the deaths of "two children aged eight and nine years, two women who were ill, and an infirm old man." Esplana used his office to both procure young girls for sexual exploitation and put profits from the galleon trade in his own pocket. In 1688, when Esplana suddenly left for Manila, Quiroga became interim governor and disciplined soldiers to force them to give up "the licentious life to which they were accustomed." The outraged soldiers mutinied and threw Quiroga into a cell. Only the pleading of the Jesuit mission superior stopped the garrison's plans to execute Quiroga and secured his release. Esplana returned the next year, though he largely lived in Umatac as he worked on his shipping schemes.

Eventually, the garrison gave in to the demands of the missionaries to finish the conquest of the northern islands. In early 1691, Esplana, Quiroga, and 80 soldiers sailed to Rota, where the visibly trembling governor pled the populace for peace before ordering the expedition back to Guam. This convinced the Jesuits that Esplana was incapable of bringing the rest of the Marianas under the control of the mission. Nevertheless, by 1689 the number of Spanish troops had increased to 160, while the Marianas mission reached its maximum of twenty Jesuits. Meanwhile, the Chamorro population of Guam continued to be wracked by foreign-introduced disease; in 1689, the pre-San Vitores population of 35,000 to 50,000 had fallen to below 10,000.

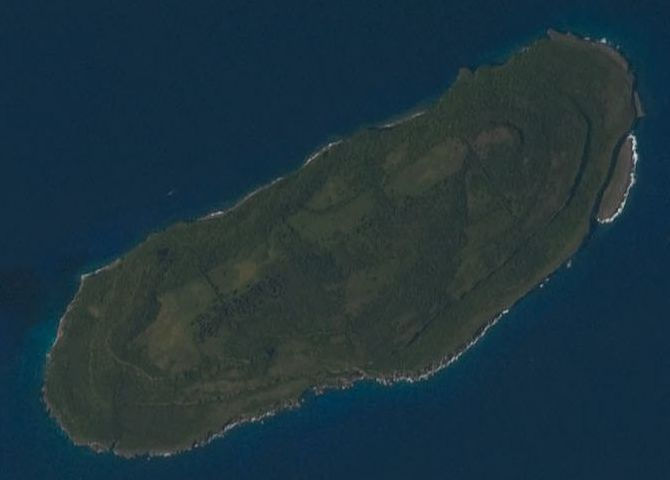
The sheer cliffs of Aguijan were an obstacle to the 1694 Spanish expedition

Esplana died in August 1694 and Quiroga used his position as interim governor to finally complete conquering the Marianas. In September, Quiroga and 50 soldiers sailed to Rota where they chased the residents of a resisting village into the mountains until they gave up. The Spaniards destroyed their weapons and relocated 26 sakmans worth of people to Guam. In July 1696, Quiroga and 80 troops, including a unit of Chamorro militia, sailed to Tinian. However, the residents took refuge in the imposing mountain island of Aguijan. Several Spanish soldiers were killed by stones and spears when trying to approach and Quiroga withdrew to Saipan, while he waited for 20 sakmans of Chamorro militia to catch up. On Saipan, Quiroga encountered only token resistance, chasing Saipanese warriors for days. However, he also told the populace that he would not seek revenge as long as they allowed missionaries to work on the islands in the future.

When he returned to Tinian with his Chamorro allies, Quiroga found that the entire population had retreated to Aguijan. Quiroga made the same offer to the people of Tinian that he had made on Saipan, but they did not respond. He then burned the houses on Tinian as a warning, to no response. The Spaniards then blockaded Aguijan so the refugees could not get food or water, before finally assaulting the island directly. Several defenders were killed and some who expected to be executed threw themselves off the cliffs, but none resisted once the Spanish force reached high ground. Several people implicated in the murder of a priest were executed. Quiroga pronounced that all the people of Tinian must relocate to Guam. Some of the people of Tinian fled to the northern islands to escape Spanish control, but none dared stay on Tinian and the island was soon abandoned.

More than 300 of the 2,000 people who lived in Gani, the eight small islands at the top of the Marianas chain, had been relocated to Saipan. When the Jesuit pastor of Saipan realized that the people from Gani had begun sneaking back to their home islands, he called on the new governor in Guam, José Madrazo, to complete the reduction of the north. In September 1698, 12 Spanish soldiers and a fleet of 112 Chamorro sakmans sailed to Gani. Awed by the size of the force, the people of Gani agreed to do whatever the Spanish desired. 1,900 residents of Gani were relocated, some temporarily to Saipan, before final settlement in southern Guam in 1699. The completion of this process was the final phase of violence and villagization that had begun 29 years earlier.

== Legacy ==
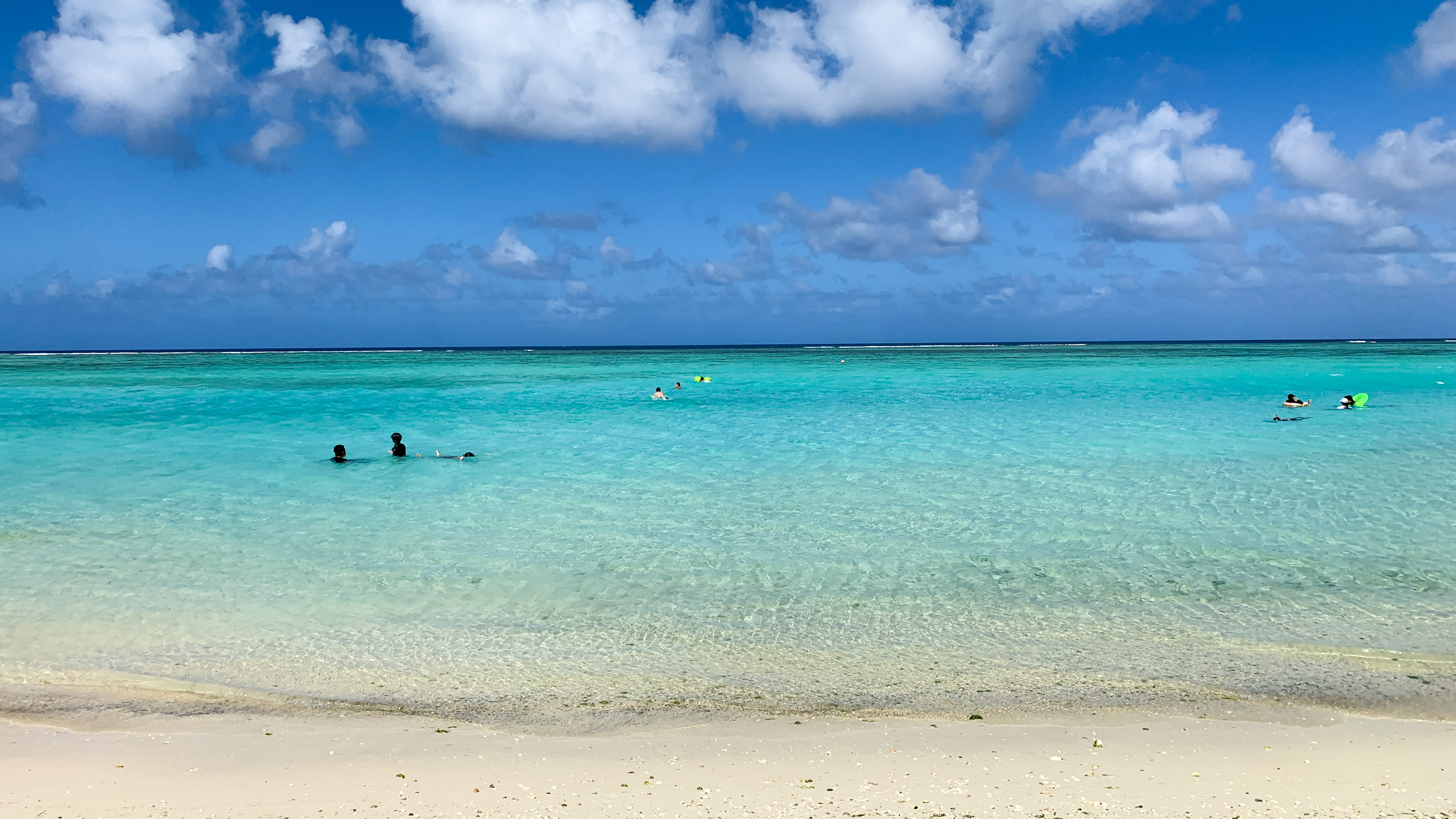
Matapang Beach Park in Tumon

Nowadays Matå'pang has been reclaimed as a celebrated figure by many in the younger generation of Chamorro activists, who view him as a moving figure of resistance against imperial domination and cultural erasure. Jay Baza Pascua's spoken-word poem "A Descendant of Matå'pang" is a good example of this movement to rehabilitate Matå'pang as a Chamorro icon. In that poem, Pascua states:

"You see, Father Luis de San Vitores was determined to bring God to the "Indios" of the Pacific.

"Determined enough he disobeyed Matåpang’s order not to baptize his ailing child ... Matåpang retaliated by killing the missionary priest.

"It was not that Matåpang defied the missionary’s spiritual relief but that San Vitores defied Matåpang’s cultural belief.

"In so doing … this legendary chief ignited the flames that started a 30-year war between the Chamorros and the Spanish ... the embers of that fire continue to burn within the hearts of those who want Guam to be free from colonial rule."

Matapang Beach Park is a small public park along Tumon Bay in Tumon that is popular with local outrigger canoe rowing teams. It is located off of Pale San Vitores Road, named after the Jesuit.
