= Gadao's Cave =

- U.S. National Register of Historic Places
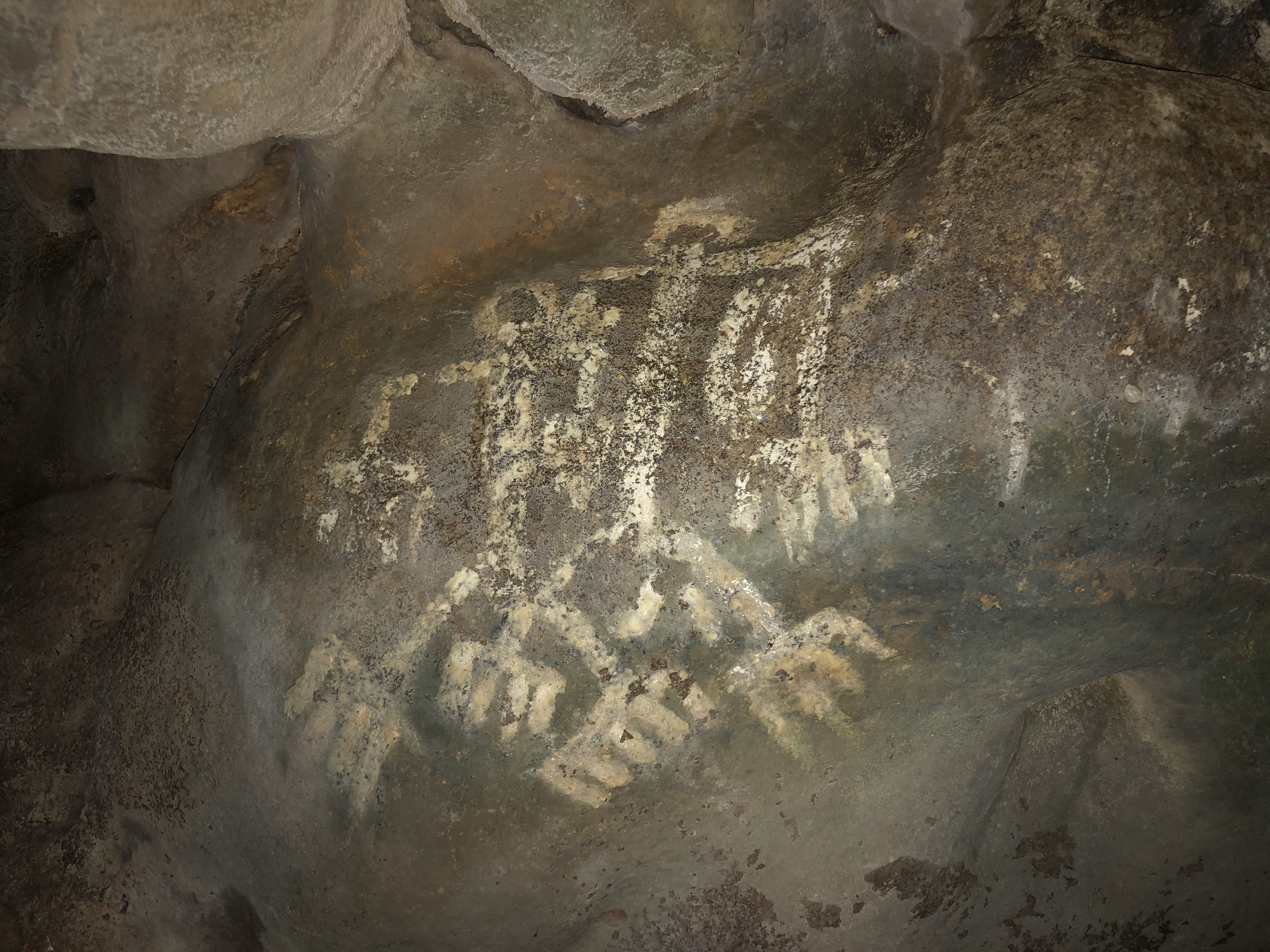
- Pictograph from Gadao's Cave thought to depict the legendary Chiefs Gadao and Malagueña.
- Location: Address restricted
- Nearest city: Inarajan, Guam
- Area: 0.1 acres (0.040 ha)
- NRHP reference No.: 74002309
- Added to NRHP: November 19, 1974

Gadao's Cave, also known as Liyang Gadao, is a rock art site on the United States island of Guam, located near the village of Inarajan. The cave was listed on the National Register of Historic Places in 1974.

== Images ==
The cave is the site of a panel of approximately 50 Chamorro pictographs, painted with a mixture of coral lime and tree sap. The most unusual images are of two human stick figures that appear to be carrying things. It is not known who painted them or when, nor what their significance is. The legendary chief of Inarajan Gadao is said to be the creator of the cave's images.

== Space ==
The entrance to the cave is about 10–12 feet (3.0–3.7 m) wide and about 10 feet (3 m) high. The following chamber is about 8 feet (2.4 m) deep, 5 feet (1.5 m) wide, and 7 feet (2.1 m) high and its highest point. A small slit between the walls at the chamber's ends opens into a small cavity about 3 feet (1 m) deep, 2 feet (60 cm) wide, and 7 feet (2.1 m) high.

The outer chamber has the majority of images, whose sizes range from about 3 inches (7.6 cm) to 1 foot (30 cm).

== Documentation ==
In 1901, Georg Fritz, the administrator of the German colonial district of the Mariana Islands, documented some of the pictograms. In 1904, he published them in Die Chamorro. It was the first publication on rock art in Micronesia.

== See also ==
- National Register of Historic Places listings in Guam
