= Kepuha =

Northern Mariana Islands chief

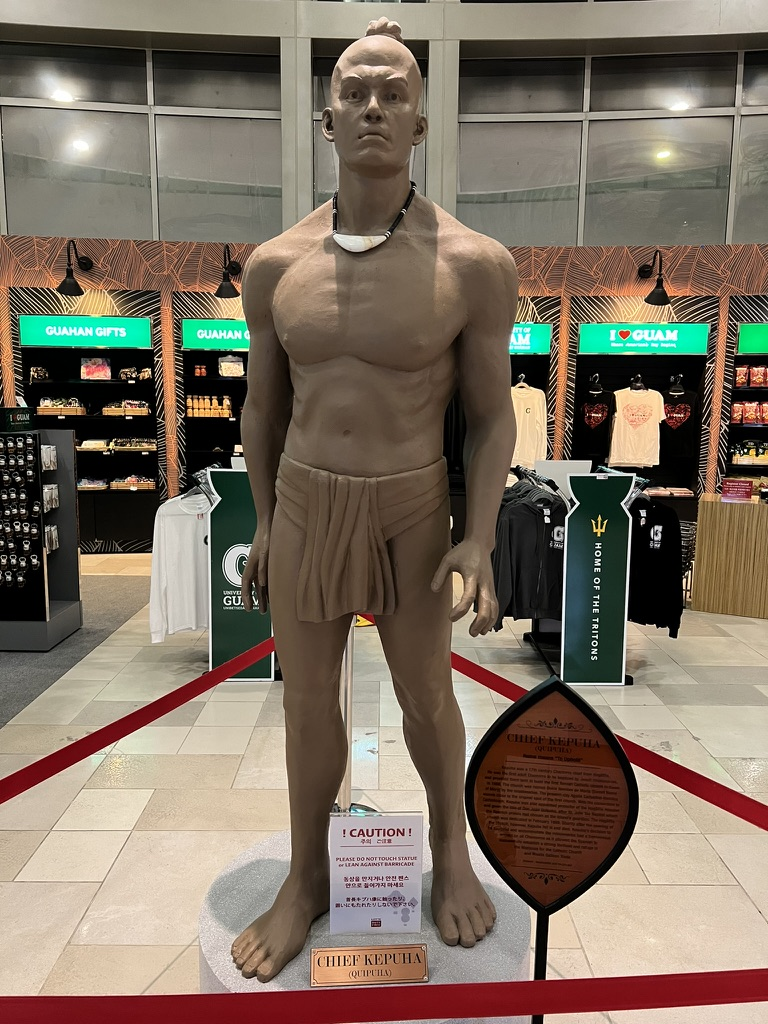
Statue of Chief Kepuha in the Guam Cultural Center, located in Antonio B. Won Pat International Airport in Tamuning, Guam.

Kepuha (died 1669), also spelled Kipuhá or Quipuha, was the island of Guam's first Catholic chief. He granted land in the village of Hagåtña to Spanish missionaries, upon which was built the first Catholic church in the Mariana Islands.

== Biography ==
Kepuha was a member of the Chamorro, the ruling caste of Chamorro society. As the elder maga'låhi, or high-ranking male, he could make important decisions with the consent of his clan’s, maga'håga, or highest-ranking females. His name translates in the Chamorro language as "try to turn over" or "to attempt to capsize.

The Spanish mission led by Jesuit missionary Diego Luis de San Vitores arrived near Hagåtña on June 16, 1668, where about 200 Chamorro warriors gathered. San Vitores sent Father Luis de Medina and another priest to greet the Chamorros, who brought them to Kepuha's house, which was decorated with palm fronds. The priests gifted Kepuha, who they described as tall and robust, a velvet hat and iron hoops and nails and told the chief that they intended to teach the Chamorros "he law of God and the way to heaven".

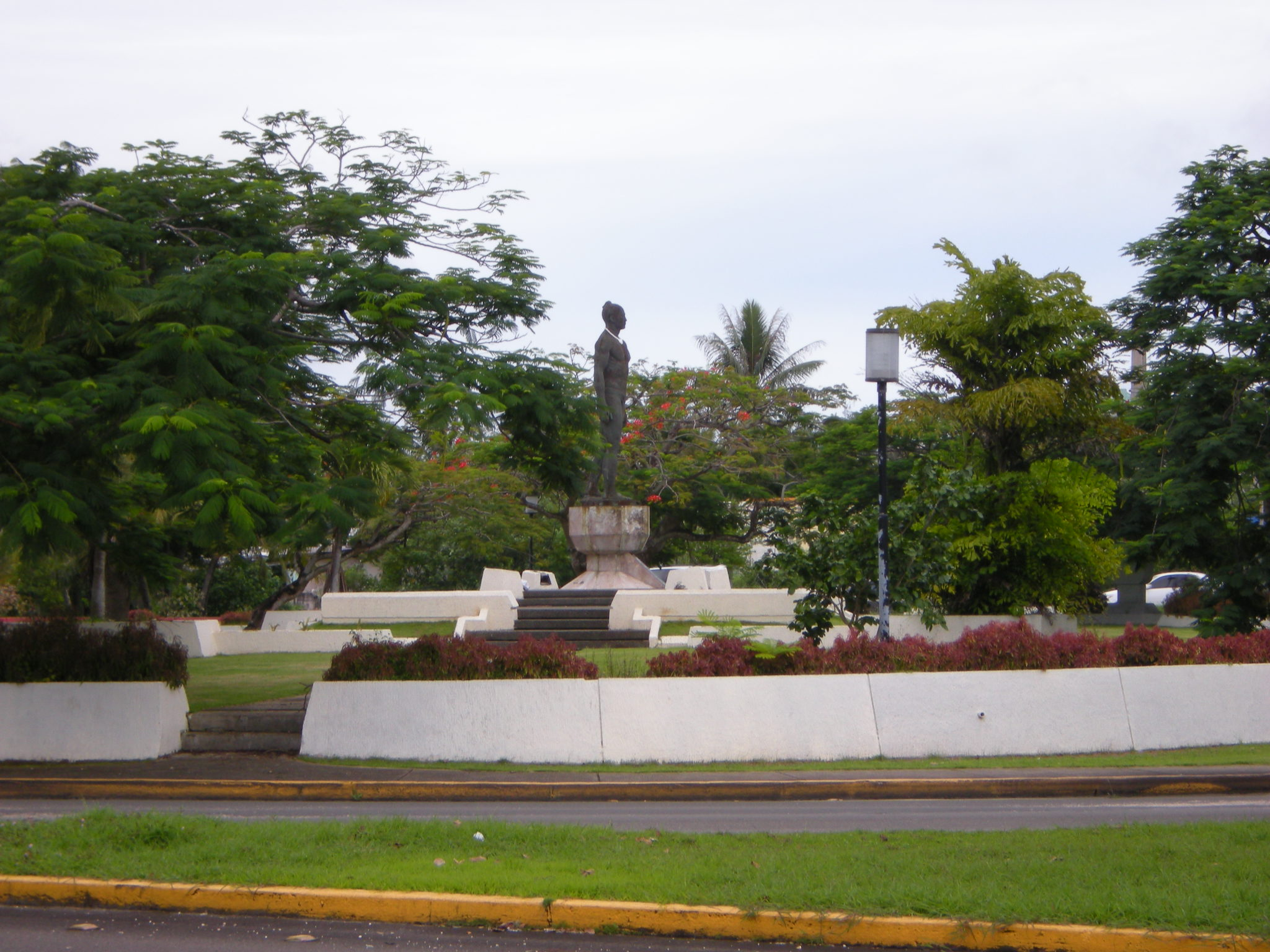
The statue of Kepuha stands within a traffic roundabout in Chief Quipuha Park at Paseo de Susana in Hagåtña

The Spaniards recorded that Kepuha responded, "You please us, Fathers and you bring us good news which will cause joy to our entire nation for we have wanted you here for a long time," and allowed himself to be baptized by San Vitores Kepuha granted land for the first church on Guam, the Dulce Nombre de Maria, which formally opened on February 2, 1669. The mission also build a school, the Royal College of San Juan de Letran. Due to the matrilineal nature of Chamorro society, the maga'håga of his clan must have influenced the grant. The Spaniards appointed Kepuha protector of the mission and gave him the title Don Juan Quipuha. The family of Kepuha may have granted the land as a political decision to gain prominence over other chiefs. There was no source of iron on Guam, and Kepuha may also have thought he could control the island's trade in Spanish goods if the mission was based in his village.

Kepuha died shortly after the dedication of the church in 1669. San Vitores treated Kepuha during his illness and insisted that Kepuha be buried at the church in a Christian ceremony. However, Kepuha's relatives wanted his body brought to a cave with the remains of his ancestors for a traditional Chamorro ceremony. San Vitores prevailed, which angered many Chamorros and convinced them that the Spanish influence would drastically change the social order.

A son of Kepuha, Chief Kepuha II, was angered that his father had not been laid to rest with his ancestors and led a revolt.

== Legacy ==
Today, the chief is honored by Chief Quipuha Park along Marine Corps Drive in Hagåtña, which includes a statue of Kepuha erected in 1976.

In 1990, former Governor Ricardo Bordallo, committed suicide by chaining himself to Kepuha's statue and shooting himself.

== See also ==
- Gadao
- Matå'pang
- Hurao
