= Gadao =

Legendary chief of Inarajan, Guam

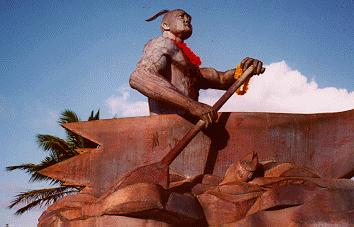
Bronze statue of Chief Gadao, Inarajan, Guam.

Gadao is a legendary chief of the village of Inarajan in southern Guam. In the Chamorro language of ancient Guam, he would have had the title maga'lahi as a high-ranking male. In addition to being featured in legend, he is the namesake of Inarajan's Chief Gadao's Cave containing ancient cave paintings. Some stories claim Gadao himself drew the figures. It is also said he was a kind giant that fought to protect his island home at all costs.

== Legends ==
Two legends featuring Chief Gadao include the Legend of the Three Feats of Strength and the Legend of the Battle Between Chiefs. The legends and their specifics vary.

In the Legend of the Three Feats of Strength, Gadao thought himself worthy of becoming the head chieftain of Guahan. To test his worth, all the chiefs of the island ordered him to overcome 3 impossible feats. For Gadao's first task, he had to swim around the island 25 times without stopping. His second task was breaking a coconut tree into ten pieces with his bare hands, and lastly, Gadao had to level Guahan's highest peak: Mount Lamlam.

Gadao succeeded and ordered his sons to construct a fence around the island using boulders before daybreak in order to defend the island from outside threats. However, Gadao's sons mistook a twinkling star for the rising sun and rushed home, leaving a boulder in the reef but the fence unfinished. The foreigners then came and conquered the island. These foreigners where Spanish invaders, whom Gadao challenged to combat wielding a sword made from the spine of a stingray. But due to the invaders advanced weaponry, Gadao was unable to ward them off and Guahan was conquered.

The Legend of the Battle Between Chiefs tells of an encounter between Gadao and Chief Mataquana. Mataquana was considered one of the strongest chiefs in Guam. When he heard of Gadao's strength, he went to Inarajan and asked someone where he could find Gadao: Mataquana wanted to prove that he was the strongest chief of Guam. Unbeknownst to Mataquana, he was speaking to Gadao. Gadao said that he would introduce Mataquana to Gadao after he rested and ate. When Gadao broke open coconuts with his small finger and wrung them with his hands, Mataquana was impressed at his strength and feared that Gadao's would be greater. Mataquana asked Gadao for the way back home. Each man rowed back to their villages in canoes.

== Other chiefs of Guam ==
- Kepuha
- Matå'pang
- Hurao

== See also ==
- Micronesian mythology
- Villages of Guam
- Hagåtña
- Tumon
- Gadao's cave

== External links and references ==
- Legends of Guam
- Chief Gadao Photos
- Kanton Tasi
- Bista Guam
