= Catholic Church in Guam =

Catholic Church In US

The Catholic Church in the United States unincorporated territory of Guam is part of the worldwide Catholic Church under the spiritual leadership of the Pope in Rome and locally administered by the Archdiocese of Agaña.

== History ==
Catholicism on the island was a product of centuries of Spanish colonial control as the island was part of the Spanish East Indies until 1898, when the United States acquired it after the Spanish–American War.

On October 14, 1965, the vicariate apostolic was raised to a diocese. The first supreme pontiff to visit the island was Pope John Paul II in 1981. Guam has been sending delegations of young people to World Youth Day since 1993.

== Our Lady of Camarin ==
The patroness of Guam and the Marianas Islands is Our Lady of Camarin (Chamorro: Santa Marian Kamalen), a miraculous image of the Blessed Virgin Mary found by a fisherman in the waters off the island's southwest coast between the 17th and 18th centuries. The image's feast day is on 8 December—the Feast of the Immaculate Conception and a declared public holiday on the island—and is celebrated with a Mass and procession around Hagåtña.
