= Paseo de Susana =

Coordinates: 13.480°N 144.753°E

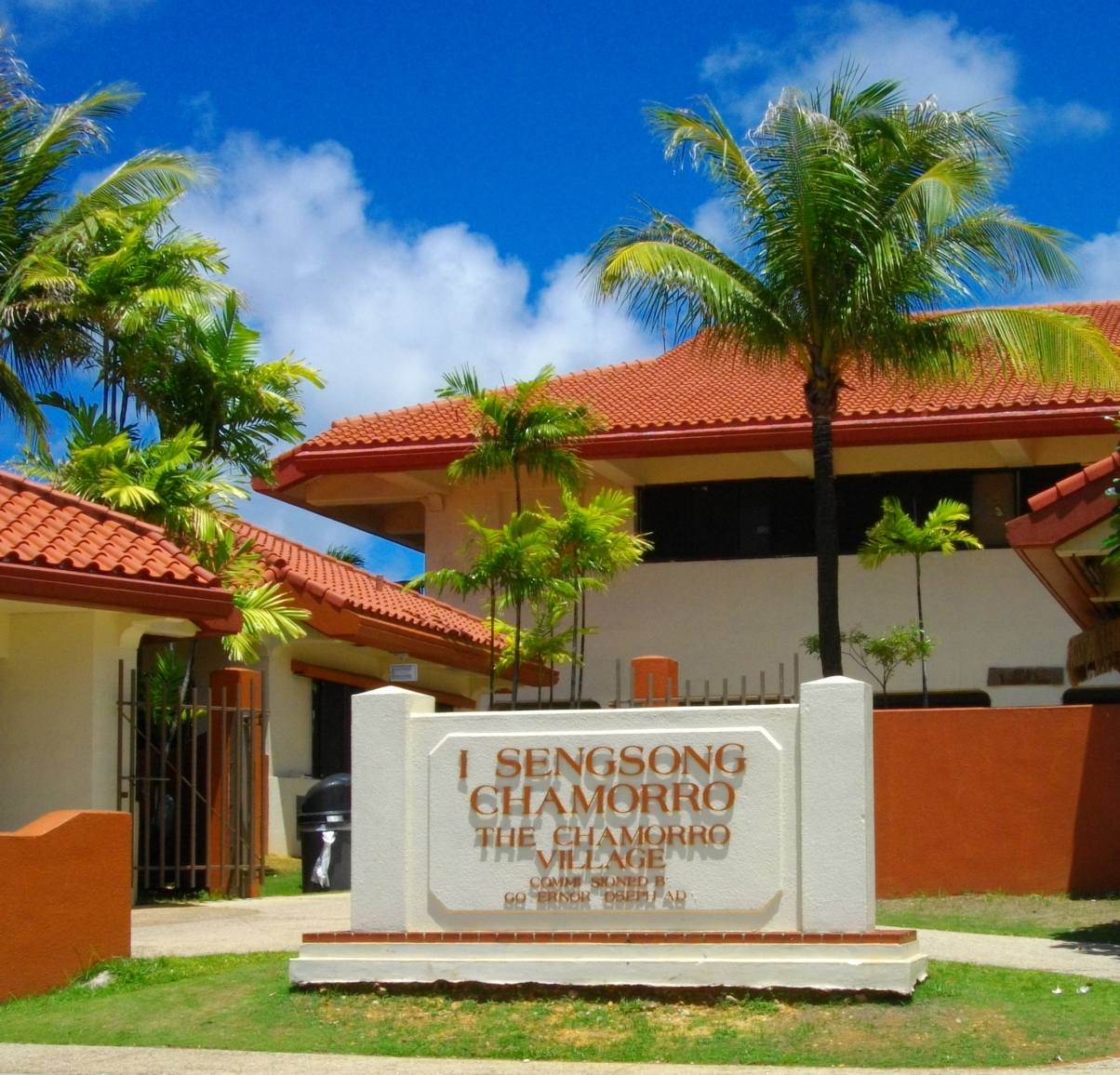
Chamorro Village is a tourist attraction located at Paseo

Paseo de Susana is a small peninsula that forms part of the city of Hagåtña, Guam. It was built in the 1940s from rubble and debris left behind after World War II. The peninsula contains the multipurpose Paseo Stadium, Chamorro Village, Chief Quipuha Park, and a small replica of the Statue of Liberty. Gregorio D. Perez Marina borders the western edge of the peninsula and it is separated from the rest of Hagåtña by Marine Corps Drive.
