= Hurao =

Chamorro chief

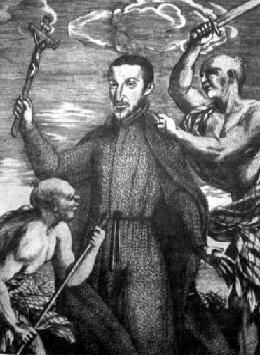
Engraving showing the murder of San Vitores by Matå'pang (right) and Hurao (left).

Hurao was a Chamorro chief on the island of Guam who led a resistance against Spain during the Spanish–Chamorro Wars. The chief's name means "emotion, caring, attention, heed". Hurao may be best remembered for his 1671 speech to Chamorro warriors opposing the Spanish presence on Guam.

He organized a 40-day siege of the Spanish mission in Agana that was finally broken by Spanish soldiers. Hurao was captured, but released by Fr. Diego Luis de San Vitores.

According to Russell's account of Father San Vitores' death, however, Hurao was in fact an accomplice to Matå'pang's 1672 killing of the priest.

Hurao was a member of the Matao/Chamorri, the highest caste in Chamorro society and held the title maga'lahi.

== See also ==
- Kepuha
- Gadao
- Matå'pang
