= Matå'pang =

17th-century Chamorro village chief

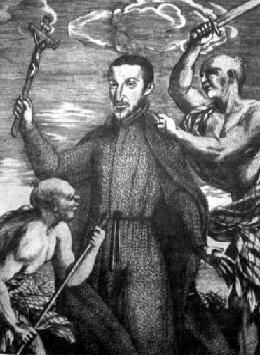
Engraving showing the murder of San Vitores by Mata'pang (right) and Hurao (left).

Matå'pang (died 1680) was a Chamorro maga'låhi or chief of the ancient Chamorro village of Tomhom on the island of Guahan. His name meant "to be made pure by cleansing" in Chamorro.

Matå'pang is best known for resisting the Spanish invasion during the Spanish–Chamorro Wars and for his conflict with a Spanish priest Diego Luis de San Vitores, an early missionary of the colonial Spanish empire on Guam, and his Filipino associate, Pedro Calungsod, resulting in the deaths of the foreigners at the hands of Matå'pang and his companion Hurao.

Today Matå'pang has become well known among many activists for Chamorro self-determination.

== Biography ==
Early in his life, Matå'pang converted to Christianity, but later renounced the faith after seeing the Spaniards use it to suppress Chamorro culture. However, in an attempt to draw Matå'pang back to the church, Diego Luis de San Vitores covertly baptized Matå'pang's infant daughter in 1672. This action infuriated Matå'pang, not just because of the baptism but also because it violated a taboo against entering a chief's home; after learning of his daughter's baptism, Matå'pang immediately tracked down and killed San Vitores.

The death of San Vitores caused the Christianizing mission on Guam to deteriorate into open conflict, and Matå'pang began acting as a key military leader among the Chamorro. However, he was eventually injured in battle, and retreated to the nearby island of Rota to recuperate. A Spanish fleet was subsequently sent to Rota to track down Matå'pang, and fearing that they would draw the Spaniards' ire, the island's population turned on him. The people of Rota attacked Matå'pang and cast him out on a boat; Matå'pang would succumb to his injuries while sailing back to Guam.

== Cultural references ==
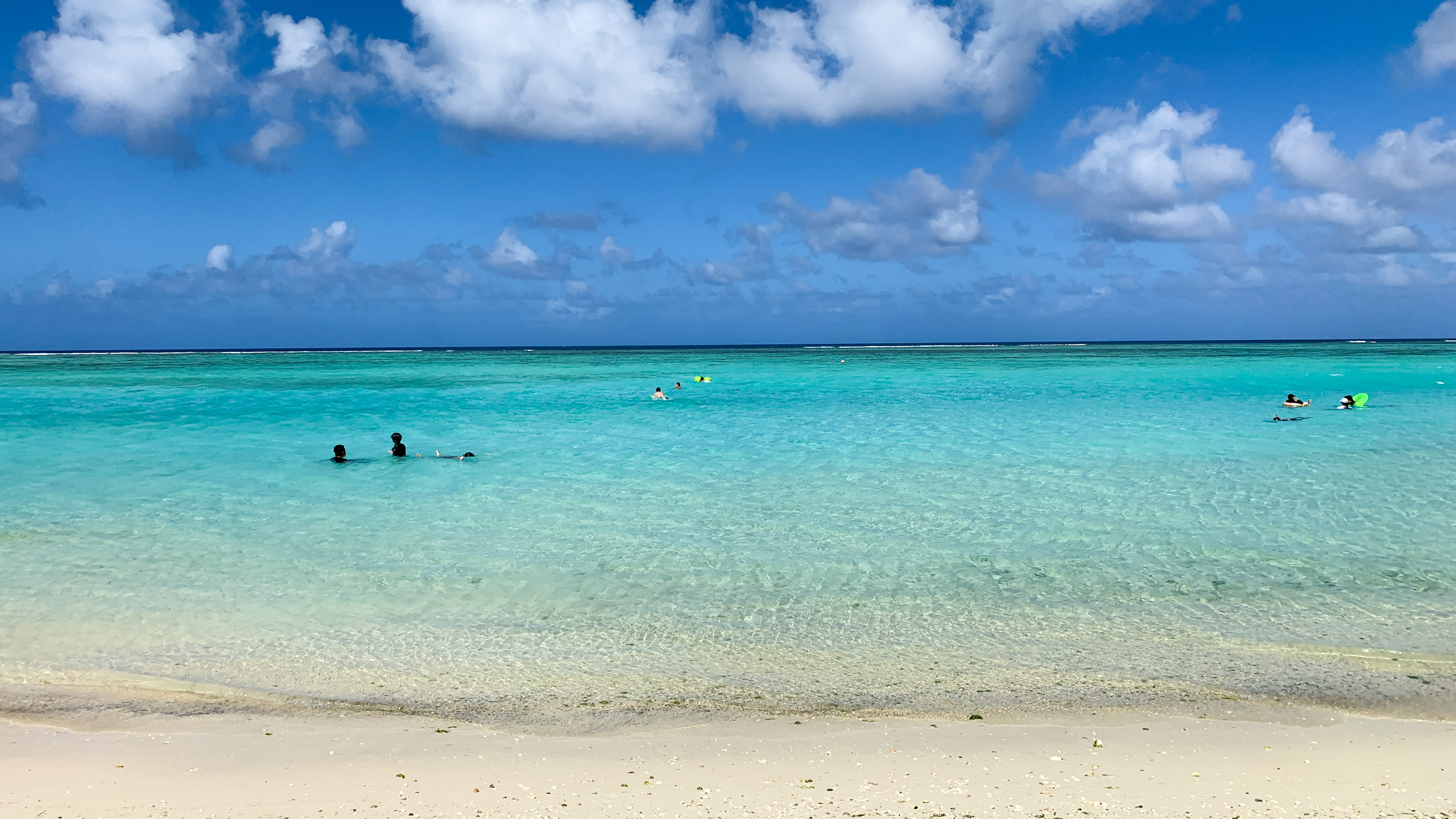
Matapang Beach Park in Tumon

Matå'pang today has been reclaimed as a celebrated figure by many in the younger generation of Chamorro activists, who view him as a moving figure of resistance against imperial domination and cultural erasure. Jay Baza Pascua's spoken-word poem "A Descendant of Matå'pang" is a good example of this movement to rehabilitate Matå'pang as a Chamorro icon. In that poem, Pascua states:

"You see, Father Luis de San Vitores was determined to bring God to the "Indios" of the Pacific.

"Determined enough he disobeyed Matåpang’s order not to baptize his ailing child ... Matåpang retaliated by killing the missionary priest.

"It was not that Matåpang defied the missionary’s spiritual relief but that San Vitores defied Matåpang’s cultural belief.

"In so doing … this legendary chief ignited the flames that started a 30-year war between the Chamorros and the Spanish ... the embers of that fire continue to burn within the hearts of those who want Guam to be free from colonial rule."

Matapang Beach Park is a small public park along Tumon Bay in Tumon that is popular with local outrigger canoe rowing teams. It is located off of Pale San Vitores Road, named after the Jesuit.

== Academic critiques ==
Professor Vince Diaz has critically examined the legacy of Maga'låhi Matå'pang in his presentation and later article "In the Wake of Matå'pang's Canoe." His talks deconstruct the varying accounts of Matå’pang from both indigenous and colonial views. In doing so, he utilizes the metaphor of the canoe – the literal and symbolic seafaring vessel of the Chamorros – and delves into the linguistic variations of the word matå'pang between Chamorro and Tagalog. "The first step is to displace momentarily San Vitores as the principle sign in favor of Native perspective and reality, so that the new protagonist is Matå'pang", said Diaz. "The second step would be to appreciate Matå'pang in native discourse, that is, in terms of how it has and how it can be understood and comprehended in indigenous ways".

== See also ==
- Hurao
- Gadao
