= Diego Luis de San Vitores =

Spanish missionary (1627–1672)

Blessed Diego Luis de San Vitores S.J.
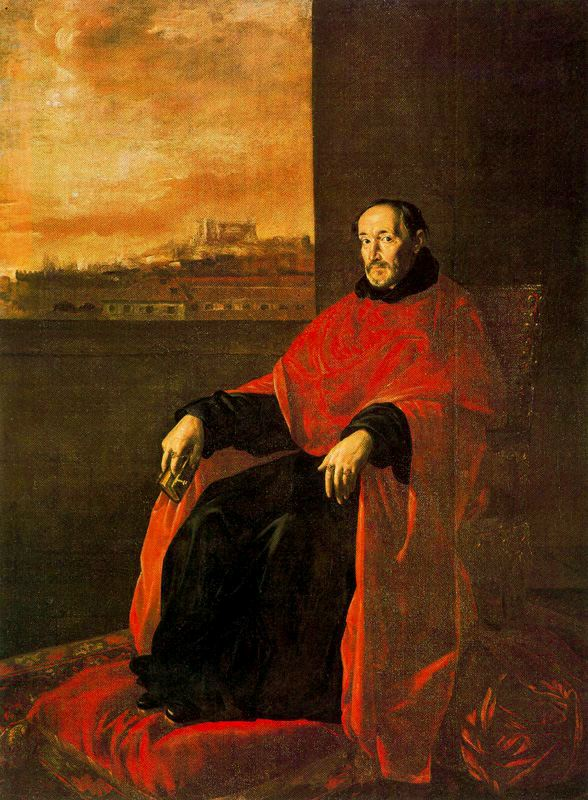
- Diego Luis de San Vitores (17th century), by Juan Rizi, Museo de Burgos.

Martyr
- Born: November 12, 1627; Burgos, Spanish Empire
- Died: April 2, 1672 (aged 44); Tumon, Guam, Captaincy General of the Philippines
- Venerated in: Roman Catholic Church
- Beatified: October 6, 1985, Vatican by Pope John Paul II
- Feast: October 6

Jesuit mission superior of the Mariana Islands
- In office 16 June 1668 – 2 April 1672
- Monarch: Charles II
- Regent: Mariana of Austria
- Valido: Juan Everardo Nithard; Fernando de Valenzuela
- Viceroy of New Spain: Antonio Sebástian Álvarez de Toledo
- Governor-General of the Philippines: Diego de Salcedo; Juan Manuel de la Peña Bonifaz (as interim); Manuel de León
- Preceded by: Position created
- Succeeded by: Francisco Solano

Diego Luis de San Vitores, SJ (November 12, 1627 – April 2, 1672) was a Spanish Jesuit missionary who founded the first Catholic church on the island of Guam. He is responsible for establishing the Christian presence in the Mariana Islands. He and his right-hand man Pedro Calungsod are controversial figures in some circles due to their role in the Spanish–Chamorro Wars, as well as the colonization and genocide of the Chamorro people.

== Early life ==
A son of a nobleman, he was baptized Diego Jerónimo de San Vitores y Alonso de Maluendo. He was born on November 12, 1627, in the city of Burgos, Spain to Don Jerónimo de San Vitores and Doña María Alonso Maluenda. His parents attempted to persuade him to pursue a military career, but San Vitores instead chose to pursue his religious interests. In 1640, he entered the Jesuit novitiate and was ordained a priest in 1651. San Vitores was granted his request for a mission in the Philippines.

In 1662, San Vitores stopped in Guam on the way to the Philippines and vowed to return. Three years later, through his close ties to the royal court, he persuaded King Philip IV of Spain and Queen Mariana of Austria to order a mission in Guam be established.

== Mission to Guam ==
In 1668, San Vitores set sail from Acapulco to Guam. San Vitores called the Chamorro archipelago "Islas Marianas" (Mariana Islands) in honor of the Queen Regent of Spain, Maria Ana of Austria, and the Blessed Virgin Mary. The missionary landed on Guam in the village of Hagåtña and was greeted by Chief Kepuha. Kepuha's family donated land to establish the first Catholic mission on Guam. On February 2, 1669, San Vitores established the first Catholic Church in Hagåtña and dedicated it to "the sweet name of Mary," "Dulce Nombre de Maria."

According to former journalist and Guampedia editor Tanya Champaco Mendiola: "The Chamorros initially welcomed San Vitores and the other Catholic missionaries, and hundreds were readily converted. The nobles of the community may have believed this would elevate their social status while other village chiefs desired priests for their own village, probably as symbols of status. Some islanders apparently also received the sacrament of baptism more than once for the gifts of beads and clothing they were given. This enthusiasm for Catholicism did not last long, however, as several factors quickly came into play, including the conflicts it created in the hierarchal caste system of the Chamorros. The church preached that once baptized, people were equal in the eyes of God. The missionary’s dogmatic zeal was also not well received as the Jesuits shunned long-standing traditional beliefs and practices in trying to assimilate the Chamorros in Christian doctrine. This included the rejection of the Chamorros long-standing veneration of ancestors. As part of the religious practices of Chamorro culture, people had the skulls of deceased family members placed in baskets in places of honor in their homes. The Chamorros believed that this allowed their deceased to have a place to stay and often sought the guidance of their ancestors and favors from them in their daily endeavors. The missionaries told the Chamorros that their ancestors (including parents and grandparents) were burning in hell because they had not been baptized as Christians."

The destruction of venerated ancestral skulls is often cited as a grave and insensitive offense by the missionaries against the indigenous Chamorro people.

After Chief Kepuha died in 1669, Spanish missionary and Chamorro relations worsened, and the Chamorro–Spanish War began in 1671, led on the Chamorro side by Maga'låhi (Chief) Hurao. After several attacks on the Spanish mission, peace was negotiated. Though San Vitores initially wanted to emulate Francis Xavier, who did not use soldiers in his missionization efforts in India, as his model priest, he also felt that a military presence would be necessary to protect the priests serving Guam.

In 1672, San Vitores ordered churches built in four villages, including Merizo. Later that year, Chamorro resistance increased and San Vitores, along with his sacristan Pedro Calungsod, was killed by Matå'pang and Hurao.

== Recognition by the church ==
The cause for San Vitores's beatification was formally opened on 16 March 1695, granting him the title Servant of God.

Oscar Calvo, one of the primary figures in the reestablishment of the Catholic Church after the Japanese occupation of Guam, sought the beatification of San Vitores for many years. Calvo distributed copies of Alberto Risco's 1970 The Apostle of the Marianas: The life, labors, and martyrdom of Ven. Diego Luis de San Vitores, 1627-1672, translated from Italian to English, to raise awareness on Guam. He visited Spain to search for more information on San Vitores and eventually had a copy of The Life and Martyrdom of the Venerable Father Diego Luis de San Vitores of the Society of Jesus, First Apostle of the Mariana Islands and Events of These Islands from the Year Sixteen Hundred and Sixty-Eight Through the Year Sixteen Hundred and Eighty-One, by Francisco García translated into English. Pope John Paul II beatified San Vitores in Rome in 1985.

== Criticism ==
While San Vitores remains venerated by many, he is also a figure of criticism in indigenous Chamorro art and literature today. The controversy over his legacy in the Marianas remained strong.

=== In art ===
The well-known Chamorro poet Craig Santos Perez critically considers San Vitores's negative impact in his poem "from achiote" and other works. The spoken-word poet Jay Baza Pascua seeks to rehabilitate Matå'pang's image as a great chief and leader in his poem "A Descendant of Matå'pang."

=== Academic critiques ===
Vince Diaz focuses on San Vitores, the canonization movement, and San Vitores's legacy of alleged "mass destruction" among the Marianas' indigenous peoples in his book Repositioning the Missionary.

Cynthia Ross Wiecko describes San Vitores and other Jesuit missionaries as "agents of empire":

"Using the lens of ecological change brings Jesuits into a different perspective, one where it is difficult to see them as heroes. Although the socially disruptive effects of militarization and forced catholicization were immediately visible, the two forces also worked hand in hand to destroy ancient Chamorro settlements and profoundly disrupt land use patterns."

Wiecko also states:

"Population estimates ranged from 35,000 to 60,000, with an estimated total Chamorro population throughout the Marianas between 40,000 and 100,000. Introduced diseases—especially smallpox, influenza, and tuberculosis—contributed to most of the decline after 1668, but deaths from the Spanish-Chamorro Wars certainly played a role in the indigenous population's decline as well. Reflecting the devastating blows to Guam's native population, the first official Spanish census in 1710 indicated the Chamorro population to be 3,197. At that time, twenty percent of the population lived in and around Agaña, with the remaining population spread among the other reducción villages. By 1760, the total population numbered just 1,654 and later fell to only 1,318 in 1786. This was just a shadow of the once-thriving Chamorro society Europeans first encountered... The evidence here indicates that imperial dominance and catholicization shared similar roots of brutality, directly affecting changes in the landscape, settlement patterns, and land use. The combined effects of both fundamentally altered the island's people and environmental history."

Robert Haddock on A History of Health on Guam: ". . . as the Spanish eventually quelled the Chamorro rebellion, "peace" was established at the price of the extinction of a race."

Francis X. Hezel writes:

“ What began as a religious mission to proclaim the gospel of peace soon degenerated into an out-and-out war of military conquest which, as the histories have it, killed off vast numbers of native Chamorros before the missionaries were finally able to make believers out of the few survivors.” ("From Conversion to Conquest: The Early Spanish Mission in the Marianas", Journal of Pacific History, pp 115-137, 1982.)

Nicholas Goetzfridt states:

"A good non-action example would be the Spanish non-response to massive Chamorro depopulation. The first census of 1710 revealed that—although published interpretative variations eventually find middle ground in the 3,500 range—3,539 Chamorros (the most commonly cited number) remained out of early or pre-San Vitores ‘contact’ estimates ranging from as high as 100,000 to as low as 35,000 Chamorros living in the Mariana Islands. Regardless of the unrecoverable correct number, this figure represents a massive decline in the Chamorro population that went even further after the forced centralization of Chamorros onto Guam (with the exception of a few hundred “refugees” on Rota—Underwood 1973) and into the established, church-centered enclaves of Pago, Inapsan, Inarahan (Inarajan/Inalåhan), Merizo (Malesso’), Umatac (Humåtac), and Agat (Hågat) enforced by Joseph de Quiroga y Losada following his administrative destruction of many Chamorro villages after his 1680 arrival on Guam. By the 1758 full census, only 1,711 “native Indians” remained, along with 170 soldiers and 830 “Spanish & Filipinos.” This Spanish non-action is evident in the paucity of details concerning any Spanish effort to, if not stem the tide of this decline (often linked to an impending or even realized “extinction” of Chamorros), then render some form of medical response, particularly to the several epidemics and disease outbreaks that pepper the Spanish record. To find any reference to a Spanish effort on this front is to hold a wilting moment of history that cannot be extended into the context of Spain's centuries-long colonization of the Mariana Islands. And yet as scholarship has concerned itself with the chronological and interpretative “facts” of Guam's history, such a blatant gap in the telling of the Spanish colonial era—extending, of course, to the Northern Mariana Islands—has gone unaccounted for and has yet to materialize simply because it is not part of this regurgitated record."

== Memorials ==
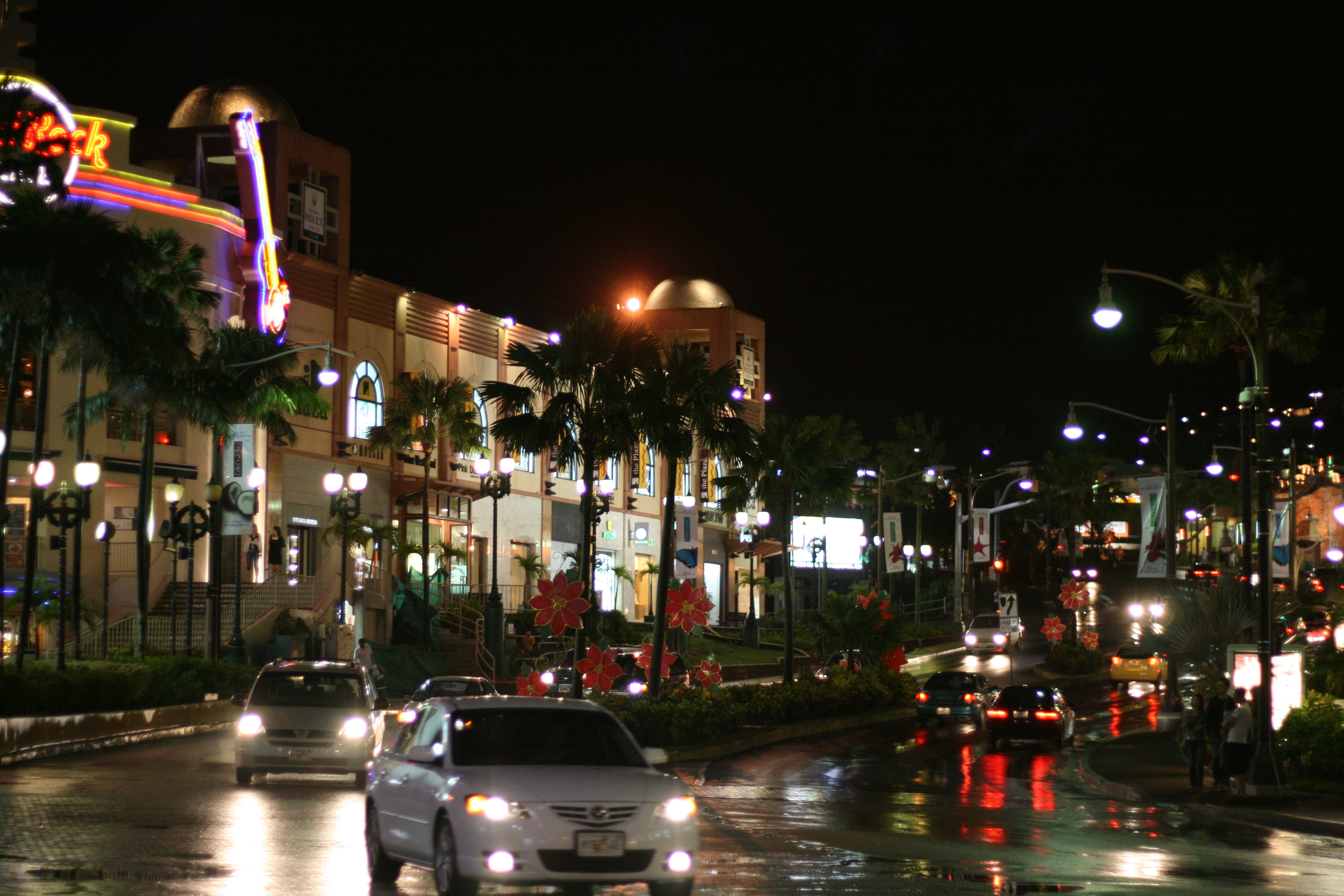
Pale San Vitores Road in Tumon is the island's main tourist strip

The San Vitores Martyrdom Site is listed on the U.S. National Register of Historic Places.

Guam Highway 14 is named Pale San Vitores Road as it curves through the tourist areas around Tumon Bay. Blessed Diego Luis de San Vitores Church, which falls under the Northern Region of the Roman Catholic Archdiocese of Agaña, is at 884 Pale San Vitores Road.

== See also ==
- History of Guam
- Felipe Songsong
- Juan de los Reyes
