= Sugar King Park =

Park in Garapan, Northern Mariana Islands

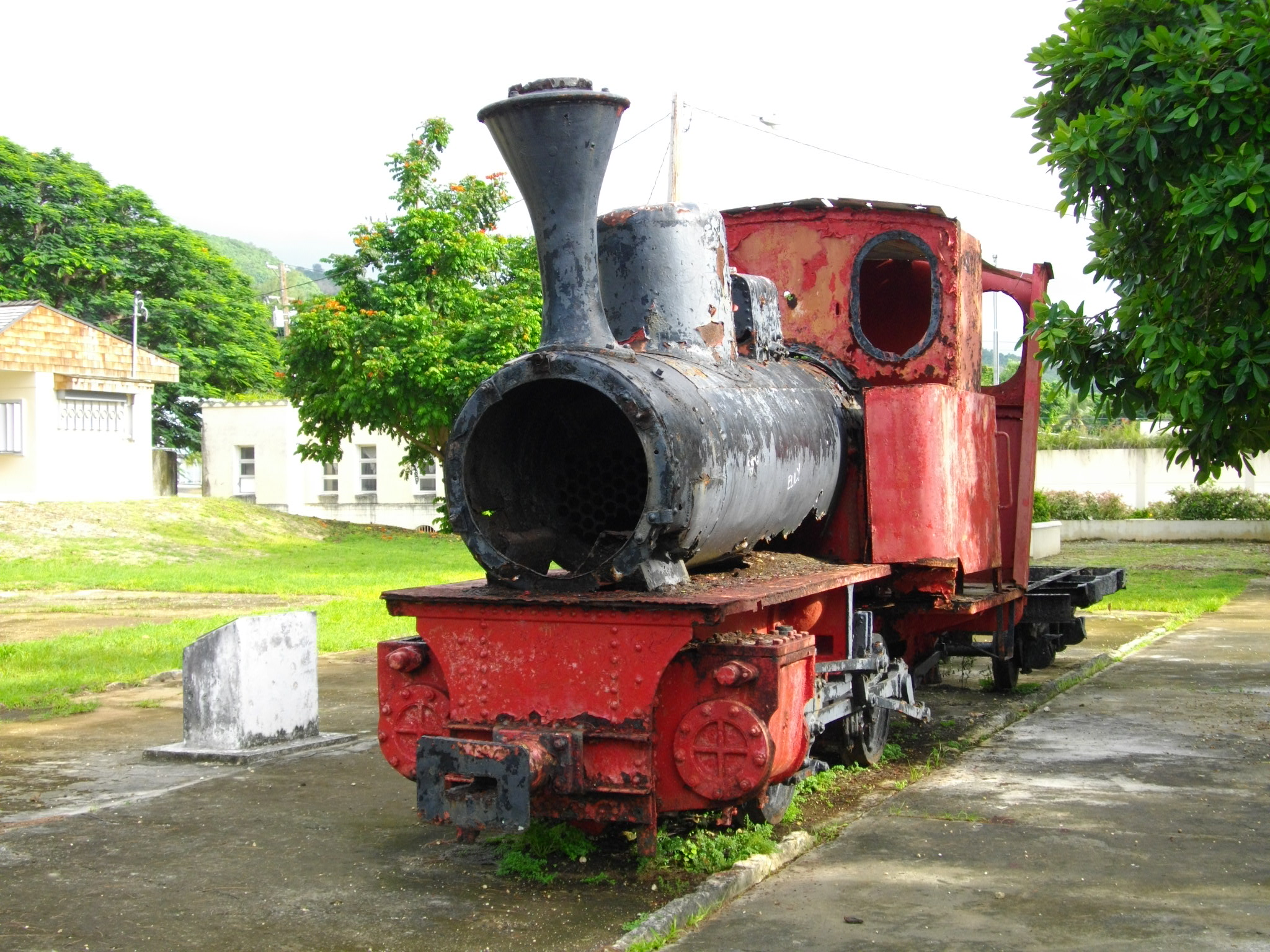
- Steam locomotive at Sugar King Park
- Interactive map of Sugar King Park
- Type: Municipal park
- Location: Garapan, Saipan, Northern Mariana Islands
- Coordinates: 15°12′6″N 145°43′18″E
- Opened: 1930s
- Operator: CNMI Government
- Status: Open all year

Sugar King Park is a municipal park located in Garapan, Saipan, Northern Mariana Islands across from the NMI Museum of History and Culture. The park was named in honor of the "Sugar King" Haruji Matsue, director of the South Seas Development Company.

The park has a statue of Matsue; a small, wood-burning locomotive; Komainu; a hexagonal hall of prayer with a peace bell; and a German period concrete stairway. The Saipan Katori Shrine in the park was rebuilt in 1985 to replace the original Katori Jinja from the Japanese period. The Nanmeido or Saipan International House of Prayer is a temple located in the park. Historical sites in the park are listed on the Garapan Heritage Trail, a project of the Northern Marianas Humanities Council with financial support by the National Endowment for the Humanities and the Office of Insular Affairs, United States Department of the Interior. The park hosts the annual Japanese Autumn Festival and Katori Jinja ceremony in October. The Northern Marianas-Japan Cultural Center is in the park.

The park is operated by the CNMI government with support from the Marianas Visitors Authority, NMI Museum of History and Culture, Japanese Society of the Northern Mariana Islands, Katori Shrine Association of Japan, and other organizations. Local schools have field trips at the park. Students from Japan, China, Korea, and other countries in East Asia visit the park as part of exchange programs.

The Sugar King Foundation was established in 1997 under the laws of the CNMI as a non-profit organization to assist in the preservation and maintenance of the park.

== History ==
In October 2004, the 19th Annual Japanese Autumn Festival was held in the park. The festival featured games for children, a yard sale, live entertainment, Shichi-Go-San rites, and Japanese delicacies. About 50 professional dancers from Hokkaido, Japan performed various numbers at the event.

In July 2005, a Japanese crew visited the park and interviewed residents and filmed for a documentary about the sugar industry in the Northern Marianas. Other members of the Japan contingent were president of Suehiro Sake Brewery Ltd., president of Aizu Brewery Union, president of Synergy Inc. In November 2005, the mayor of Aizuwakamatsu visited the park and planted a breadfruit tree next to the Matsue statue.

In June 2011, the Hokkaido Gokokujinja Memorial Group visited the park. In January 2012, students from Moon Deok Elementary School in Korea toured the park. In June 2014, the Marianas High School Japanese Language Club held a play in the park. In March 2017, the MYWAVE clubs of Saipan Southern High School and Marianas High School Visited the park as part of an island tour sponsored by Marianas Tourism Education Council and Marianas Visitor’s Authority.

In January 2020, Saipan International School students visited the park. In February 2020, students from South Korea part of Saipan International School's "Welcome to the Marianas” program visited the park.

== Shrine ==
The Saipan Katori Shrine, also known as the Saipan Katori Jinja, was built on a small hill on Saipan in 1914. It was the first Shinto shrine built in the Japanese-controlled South Seas Islands. The shrine was moved to Sugar King Park in 1931. It was destroyed during the Battle of Saipan in the Asia–Pacific War. In 1985, the Katori Shrine Association of Japan, with the assistance of the CNMI government, reconstructed it.

A ceremony honoring the combatants and civilians who died during the Battle of Saipan is held at the shrine annually in October. Shinto priests and practitioners from Japan, the Japanese Society of Northern Marianas, and other organizations carry out the memorial services.

== Temple ==
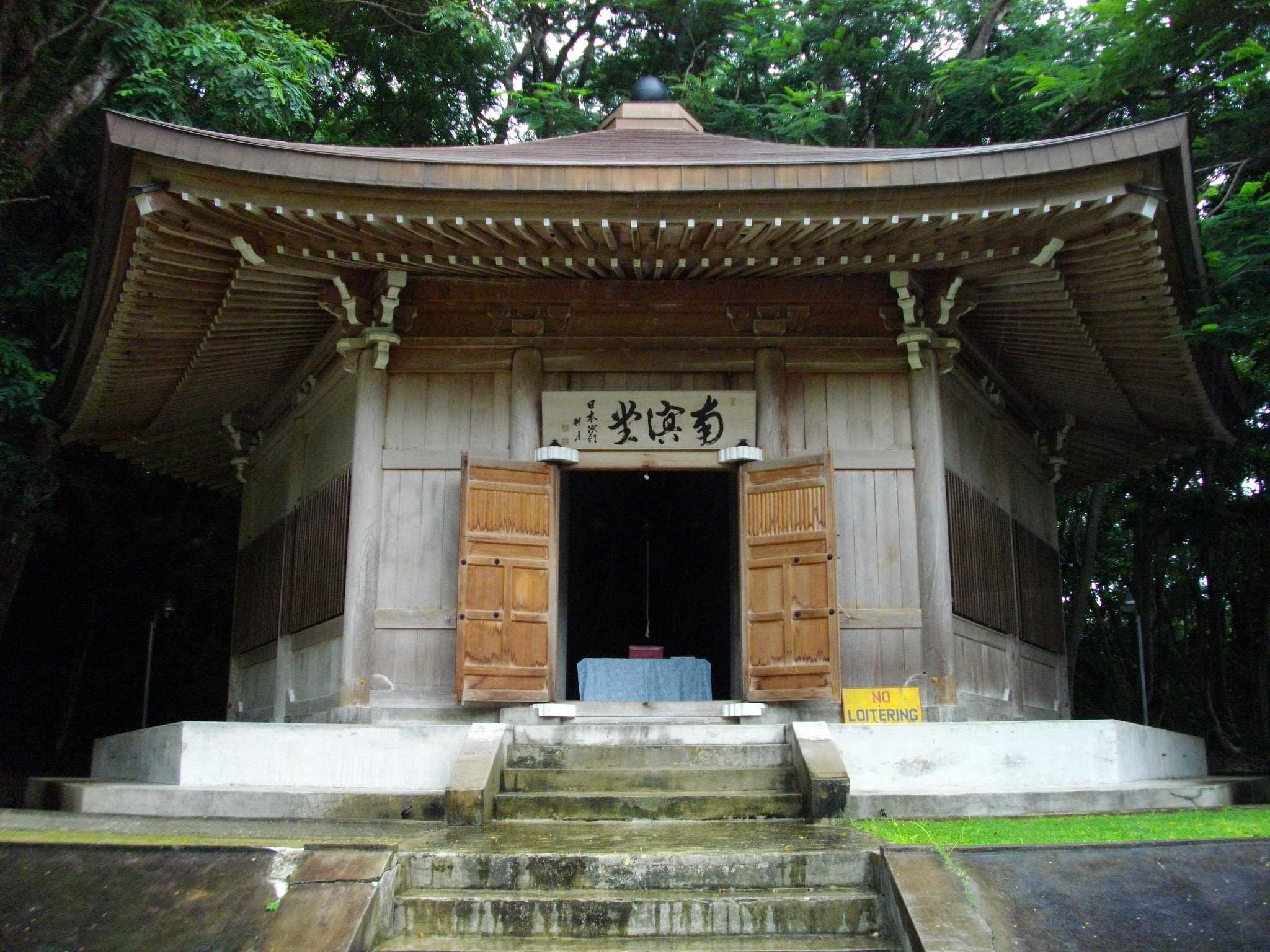
Nanmeido temple in the park

The Nanmeido(南溟堂) or Saipan International House of Prayer, built in 1990, is a non-sectarian temple located in the park dedicated to those who lost their lives in the Marianas in 1944. Inside the temple, a large peace bell hangs from the ceiling. It was donated as a wish for world peace by the Gifu Buddhist Association of Gifu, Japan in 2006.

== Cleanup Projects ==
In August 2004, crew members of the cruiser USS Vincennes (CG-49) volunteered and assisted the Saipan Mayor’s Office and the Environmental Interagency Cleanup Operation Team beautifying the park. In January 2005, officers from the USS Gary (FFG-51) participated in a cleanup drive at the park as part of community relations efforts. They trimmed trees, raked leaves and trash, cleared the drainage and cleared the overgrown nature trails, water blasted the slab pavements and parking lot, re-painted the historic buildings and structures in the area, and planted trees, flowers, and shrubs. In September 2008, crew members from the USS Rentz (FFG-46) cleaned up and landscaped the park. In March 2009, USS Frank Cable (AS-40) sailors participated in park landscaping.

In August 2015, Typhoon Soudelor damaged the Saipan Jinja, trees, railings, and other features in the park. Volunteers from the Marianas Visitors Authority, Japan Saipan Travel Association, and the Japanese Society of the Northern Mariana Islands helped clear debris and cleanup the park.

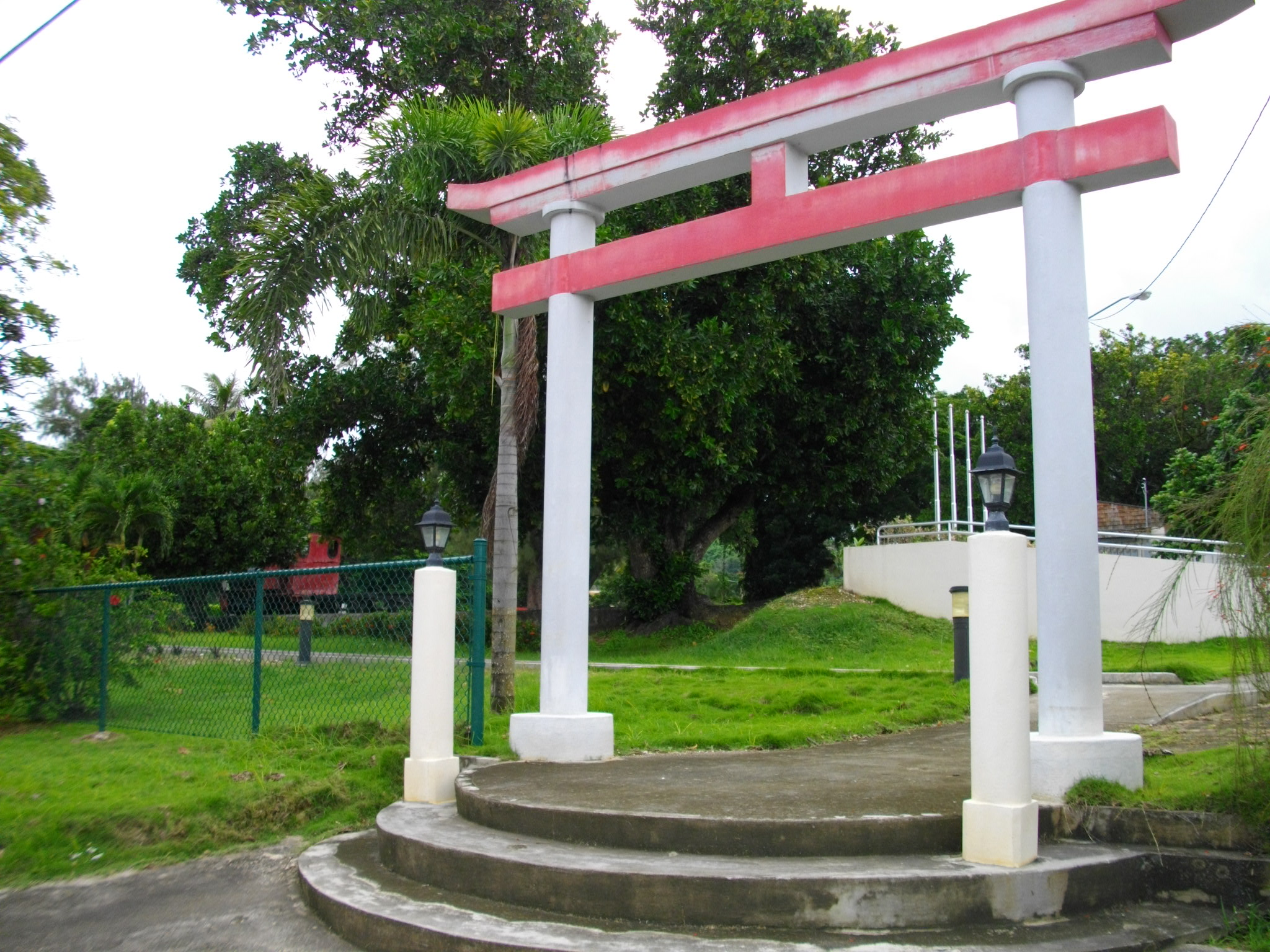
Entrance to Sugar King Park

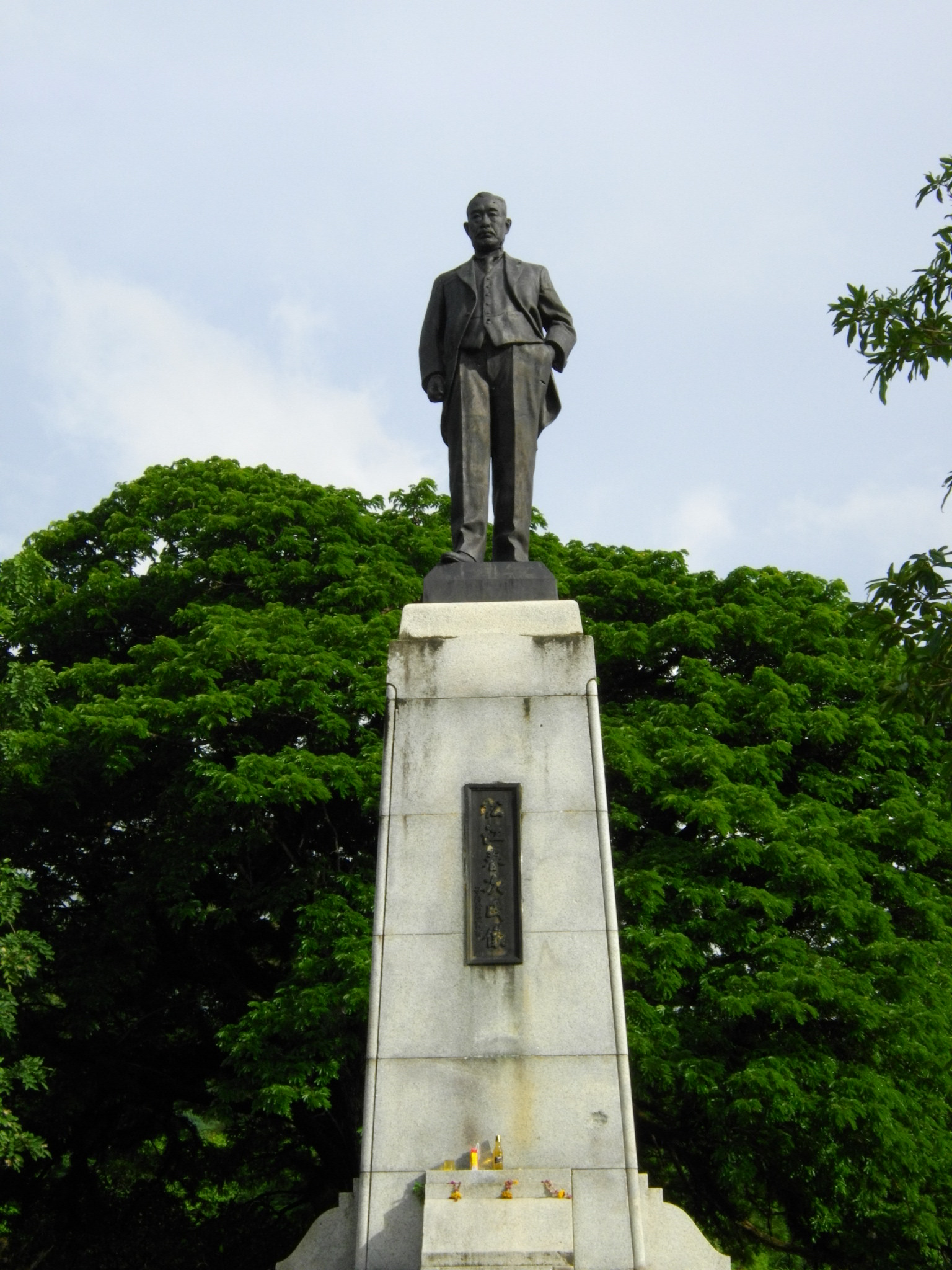
Statue of Haruji Matsue

== Criticism ==
Japanese professor Akiko Mori criticizes the park only highlighting the positive contribution of Japanese rule of micronesia to the sugar industry in saipan through the "pioneering spirit" of the sugar king Haruji Matsue to attract Japanese tourists and not covering the contributions of people groups excluded under Japanese rule(Mostly Okinawans, Koreans and indigenous people who were considered to be lower class than mainlanders) used as laborers to form the Japanese sugar colonies in the Marianas or being evicted from their homelands, a topic often minimized in Japanese academia.
