= Rail transport on the Mariana Islands =

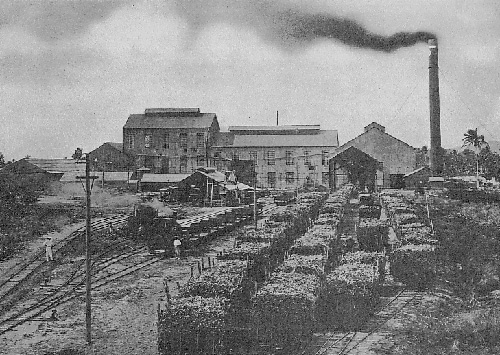
NKK sugar mill, Saipan

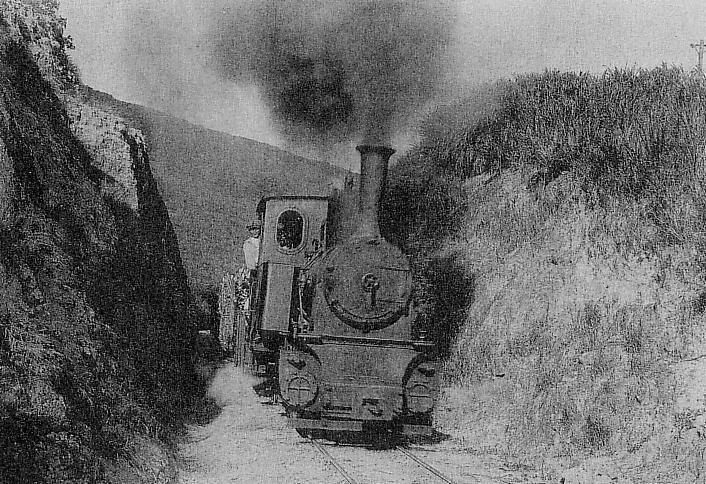
NKK sugar train, Saipan

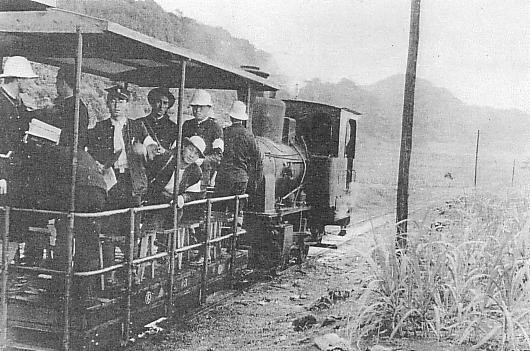
NKK picnic train

Rail transport on the Mariana Islands was mainly related to the transport of sugar cane and military supplies by narrow gauge railways.

== Saipan ==
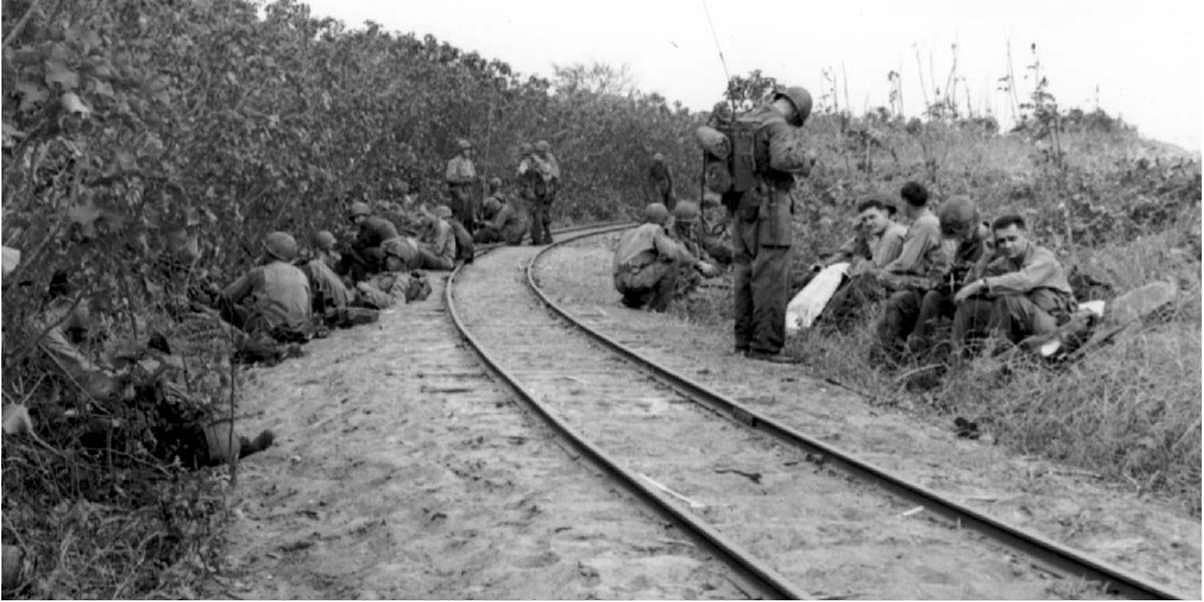
Marines rest along the narrow-gauge Japanese railroad on Saipan, July 1944

The Japanese businessman, Haruji Matsue had introduced sugar cane farms and narrow gauge railways to the Island of Saipan in the 1920s. A narrow-gauge railway with a gauge of 760 mm (2 ft 5 15/16 in) nearly circled the island of Saipan and has been used by the Japanese for transporting sugar cane and military supplies. The operation of the railway from Charan-Kanoa to the Aslito air field was taken over by Seabees attached to the 4th Mar. Regiment. Their commander, Lt. Cmdr. William G. Byrne, had focused on re-using the railway since seeing it in intelligence. Fortunately, the Japanese had not sabotaged the nearly 100 miles of track or rolling stock. The Seabees took over nine locomotives with two of them beyond repair. Three were running by 22 July 1944. The other four followed.

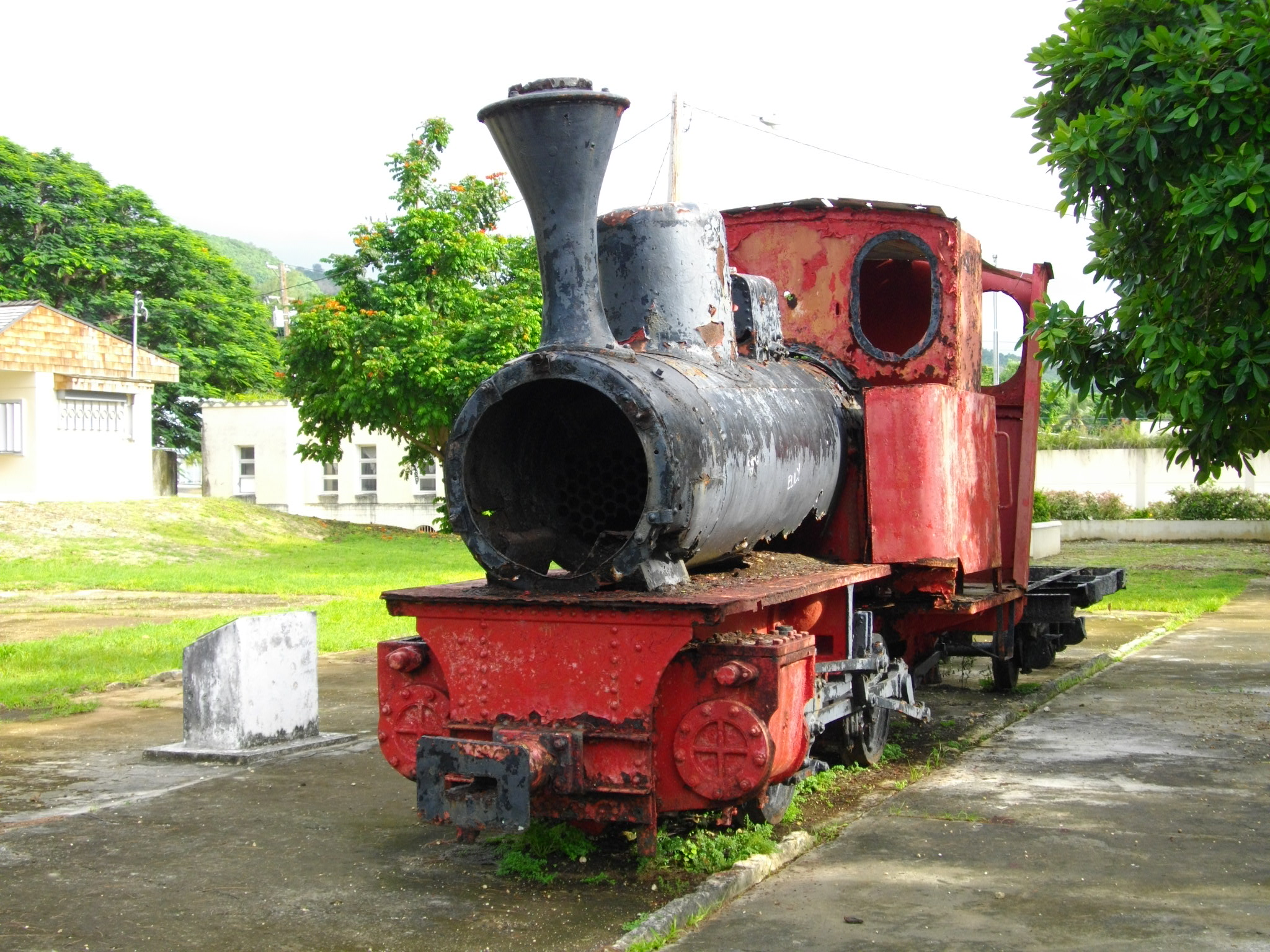
Steam locomotive at Sugar King Park, Saipan

The Seabees had one diesel locomotive and three steam locomotives, plus 100 flat cars they turned over to the Army's Transportation people. The railway was operated by the 1398th Engineer Construction Battalion. At the end of July 1944 the traffic volume was 150 tonne-miles (240 tonne-kilometres) per day. However, some rail lines were taken up and replaced by roadway on the existing right of way. Two of the steam locomotives were modified to sterilize waste bins. One locomotive has been parked in Sugar King Park, at Garapan.

== Rota and Tinian ==
By 1925 Matsue had built an alcohol factory and ice plant (NKK) on Saipan, and planted over 3000 hectares of sugar. Subsequently, he established similar facilities on the neighbouring islands of Rota and Tinian. Each of the plantations had its own narrow gauge railway network. The mills were destroyed during World War II and did not reopen. As a relic of the railway a locomotive has been preserved on the island of Rota.

== Guam ==
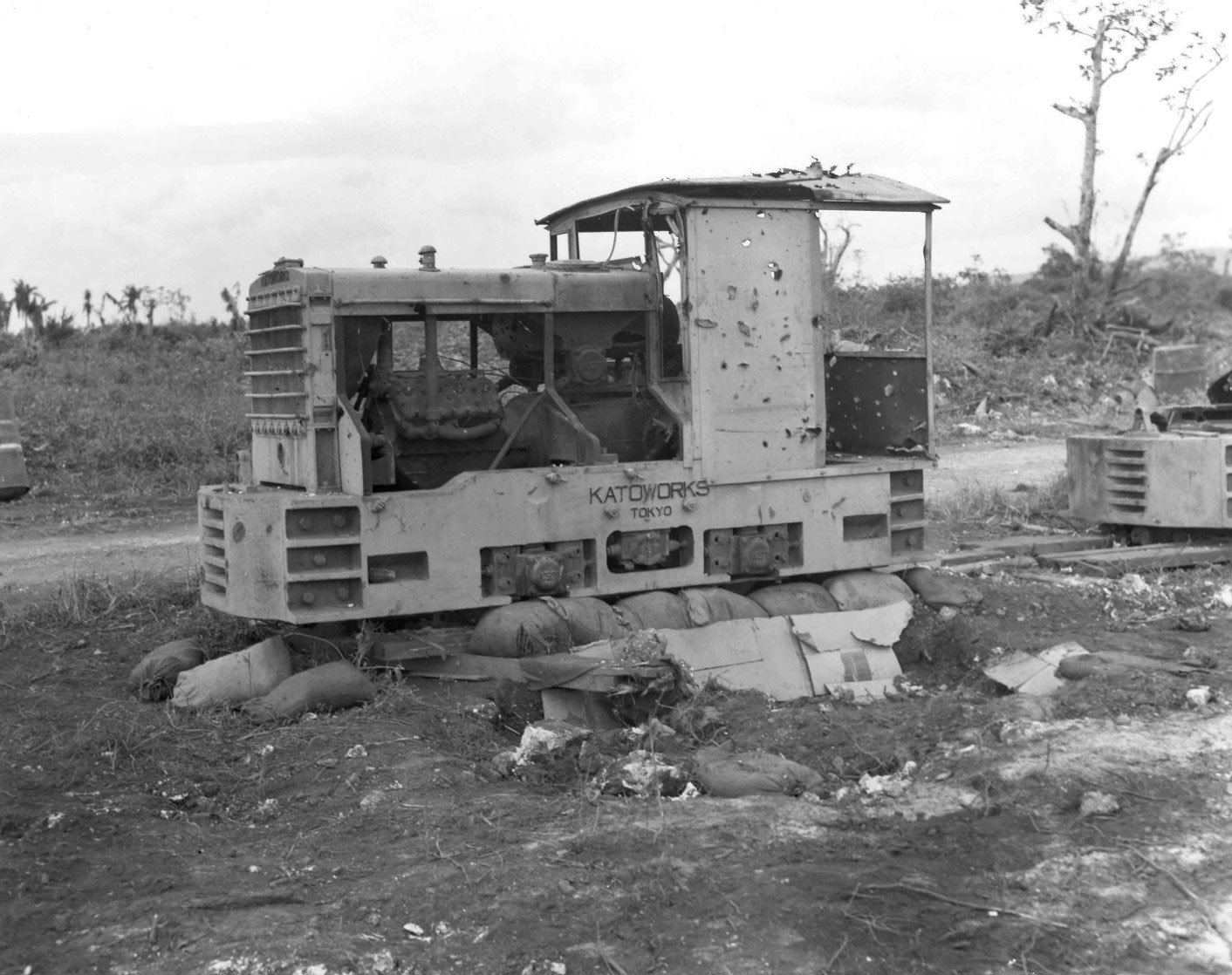
Japanese narrow gauge railroad locomotive at the Orote Peninsula Airfield, Guam, Mariana Islands, 5 October 1944

Two Japanese narrow-gauge diesel locomotives were photographed on 5 October 1944, while being placed on wooden beams at the airfield on the Orote Peninsula in Guam. They were used as cover during the Landing of US-American troops and thus severely damaged. It is not known whether they were previously used for rail transport or had only just been delivered before the landing of the US-American troops. No railway tracks are shown on the peninsula on maps of that time.
