= Structure of the Imperial Japanese forces in the South Seas Mandate =

This article covers the Japanese garrisons on the by-passed Pacific islands from 1944 to 1945, including the Japanese mandated territory of the South Seas Mandate.

== South Pacific detachment ==
=== Commander-in-Chief of the South Pacific Detachment ===
- Boshiro Hosogaya: the Governor of the South Seas Mandate, also the Commander-in-Chief of the South Pacific Detachment. He represented the Japanese government and the Imperial Japanese Navy and held great power in the territory.

== Kwajalein Atoll Detachment ==
Japanese positions at Kwajalein, Wotje, and Eniwetok (Enewetak) and Roi-Namur Atolls (3,600 Japanese defenders)

=== Kwajalein Atoll Fortress ===
==== Japanese Army units ====
- Colonel Aso: Commanded 2nd Battalion and 1st Sea-mobile Brigade

=== Eniwetok Atoll Fortress ===
==== Japanese Army units ====
- First Lieut. Ichikawa: Led Tank Company/1st Sea-mobile Brigade

=== Mili Atoll Fortress ===
Mili

==== Japanese Navy units ====
- 66th Guard Unit (1,200 men), Captain Masanari Shiga
- Detachment of 4th Establishment Department (1,200 men)
- Total: 2,045 men

==== Japanese Army units ====
- 1st South-Seas Detachment (740 men)
- 107th Infantry Regiment (1,500 men)
- Total: 2,237 men

=== Wotje Atoll Fortress ===
Wotje

==== Japanese Navy units ====
- 64th Guard Unit (1,000 men), Captain Shinichi Yoshimi
- Chitose Air Unit (1,000 men)
- Establishment Department (900 men)
- Total: 2,959 men

==== Equipment ====
- 6 × 150 mm cannons
- 2 × 120 mm cannons
- 5 × 150 mm howitzers
- 6 × 127 mm AA guns

==== Japanese Army units ====
- Wotje Unit of 1st South-Seas Detachment (225 men)
- Wotje remainders of 2nd Battalion/2nd Mobile-Sea Brigade (199 men) led by Colonel Aso
- Wojte Armor Group-2nd Battalion/1st Sea-mobile Brigade
- Total: 424 men

=== Maleolap Atoll Fortress ===
Maloelap Atoll

==== Japanese Navy units ====
- 63rd Guard Unit (1,095 men), Rear Admiral Shoichi Kamada
- 252nd, 752nd, 755th Air Units (890 men)
- Detachment of 4th Establishment Department (822 men)
- Total: 2,940 men

==== Equipment ====
- 6 15 cm cannons
- 2 12 cm cannons
- 4 15 cm howitzers
- 2 field guns
- 1 regimental gun
- 10 127 mm AA guns

==== Japanese Army units ====
- 6th Company/1st Mobile-Sea Brigade (209 men)
- 7th Company/122nd Infantry Regiment (181 men)
- Total: 389 men

=== Jaluit Island Fortress ===
==== Japanese Navy ====
- 62nd Guard Unit (547 men), Captain Nisuke Masuda
- 4th Establishment Department
- Construction Unit
- Air Unit
- Total: 1,584 men

==== Japanese Army units ====
- 2nd Battalion/1st South-Seas Detachment (727 men)
- Total: 727 men

=== Mereyon Island Fortress ===
==== Japanese Army units ====
- 50th Independent Mixed Brigade (3,404 men), Major-General Katsumi Kitamura
- 331st to 335th Independent Infantry Battalions
- Tank Unit (9 Type 95 Light Tanks)
- Artillery Unit (4 field guns, 8 100 mm howitzers)
- AA Gun Unit (4 Type 88 75 mm AA Guns)
- Engineer Unit
- Signal Unit
- Hospital
- Total: 3,404 men

==== Japanese Navy units ====
- 44th Guard Unit (1,411 men), Commander Yoshinobu Miyata
- 216th Construction Unit (978 men)
- Detachment of 4th Establishment Department (616 men)
- Air Unit (85 men)
- other (131 men)
- Total: 3,221 men
- 50th Independent Mixed Brigade was reorganized in May 1944, from the following units on Mereyon; South-Seas 5th Detachment, 7th Detachment Unit (from 24th Division), 3rd Company/52nd AA Gun Battalion.

== Caroline Islands Detachment ==
=== Ponape Island Fortress ===
==== Japanese Navy units ====
- 42nd Guard Unit (600-900 men), Captain Jun Naito
- 3rd Detachment of 4th Signal Unit (36 men)
- Ponape Detachment of 4th Establishment Department (300 men)

Total: 2,000 men

==== Equipment ====
- 8 150 mm naval guns
- 8 80 mm naval guns
- 2 80 mm AA guns
- 2 127 mm AA guns

==== Japanese Army units ====
- 52nd Independent Mixed Brigade (3,322 men), Lieutenant General Masao Watanabe
- 342nd to 345th Independent Infantry Battalions
- Tank Unit (9 Type 95 Light Tanks)
- Artillery Unit (6 Type 38 75 mm Field Guns)
- Engineer Unit
- Signal Unit
- Detachment of 107th Infantry Regiment (2,173 men)
- 2nd Battalion
- 3 Infantry Mortar Companies (12 Type 97 81 mm Infantry Mortars each)
- Machine Cannon Company(6 Type 98 20 mm AA Machine Cannons)
- Tank Company (9 Light Tanks)
- Total: 5,984 men
- 52nd Independent Mixed Brigade was reorganized in May 1944, from the following units on Ponape; 3rd South-Seas Detachment, 2nd Battalion/5th Independent Mixed Regiment.

== Kusaie Island Force ==
=== Kusaie Island Fortress ===
==== Japanese Army units ====
- 2nd South-Seas Detachment(1,901 men)-Lieutenant-General Yoshikazu Harada
- Detachment HQ
- Three Battalions
- Tank Company (9 Type 95 Light Tanks)
- Engineer Company
- 107th Infantry Regiment (1,910 men)
- Regimental HQ
- 1st Battalion:
- Battalion HQ
- 4 Infantry Companies
- Artillery Company (2 80 mm Armstrong naval guns)
- Mountain Gun Battalion (4 Type 94 Mountain Guns)
- Infantry Gun Company (2 47 mm AT guns, 6 37 mm AT guns)
- Infantry Mortar Company (8 infantry mortars)
- Total: 3,811 men

==== Japanese Navy units ====
- Kusaie Detachment of 42nd Guard Unit (119 men)
- Detachment of 4th Signal Unit (24 men)
- Detachment of 4th Establishment Department (640 men)
- Total: 700 men

== Mortlock Island Detachment ==
=== Mortlock Island Fortress ===
==== Japanese Army units ====
- 4th South-Seas Detachment (700 men), Colonel Masatake Tobita
- Detachment HQ
- 3 Infantry Companies
- MG Company (8 Type 92 HMGs)
- Infantry Gun Company (4 infantry mortars, 4 AT guns)
- Tank Company (6 Medium Tanks)
- Detachment of 51st Independent Mixed Brigade (132 men)
- Total: 753 men

==== Japanese Navy units ====
- Detachment of 41st Guard Unit (250 men)
- 2 200 mm naval cannons
- 8 AA machine cannons
- 4th Meteorology Unit
- Air Base Crew
- Total: 257 men

== Enderby Island Unit ==
=== Enderby Island Fortress ===
==== Japanese Army units ====
- 11th Independent Mixed Regiment (2,769 men), Colonel Tatsuo Yasui
- Regimental HQ
- 1st Battalion (4 infantry guns, 2 mountain guns, 2 47 mm AT guns, 2 37 mm AT guns)
- 2nd Battalion (2 infantry guns, 2 AT guns)
- 3rd Battalion (2 infantry guns, 2 AT guns)
- Artillery Unit (8 field guns, 4 100 mm howitzers)
- Engineer Unit
- AA Gun Unit (6 Type 88 75 mm AA Guns)
- Signal Unit
- Total: 1,010 men

==== Japanese Navy units ====
- Detachment of 41st Guard Unit
- Total: 243 men
- The 1st and 2nd Battalions and some parts of the 11th Independent Mixed Regiment were moved to Truk due to the food shortage on the island. 335 Imperial Japanese Army soldiers and 211 Imperial Japanese Navy soldiers on the island died of hunger and an illness and 675 IJA soldiers and 32(!) IJN soldiers returned home from the island.

== Truk Island Unit ==
Japanese base at Truk, the pivot of the Japanese position in the South Seas Mandate. Truk was a huge naval complex, the "Pearl Harbor of the Japanese". It had been under construction since 1937.

Japanese aviation facilities was Dublon (Tonoas), Moen (Weno), and Eten Atolls.

=== Truk District Group ===
- Under 52nd Division Commander
- LtGen Shunzaburo Mugikura
- Nucleus: 52nd Division
- 51st Independent Mixed Brigade
- 52nd Independent Mixed Brigade

=== Truk Atoll Fortress ===
==== Japanese Navy units ====
- 4th Fleet HQ - Vice Admiral Chuichi Hara
- 4th Base Force HQ
- 41st, 43rd, 47th, 48th Guard Units
- Total: 27,856 men

==== Equipment (1942) ====
- 18 80 mm naval guns
- 10 150 mm naval guns
- 280 mm AA guns
- 12 127 mm AA guns

==== Japanese Army units ====
- 31st Army HQ (128 men), Lieutenant-General Shunzaburo Mugikura
- 52nd Division
- Divisional HQ (298 men)
- 69th Infantry Regiment (2,694 men)
- 150th Infantry Regiment (2,136 men)
- Tank Unit (103 men)*
- Signal Unit (241 men)
- Transport Unit (105 men)
- Sea Transport Unit (1,132 men)
- Ordnance Service Unit (117 men)
- Field Hospital (649 men)
- 51st Independent Mixed Brigade (4,789 men), Major-General Kanenobu Ishuin
- Brigade HQ
- 336th to 341st Independent Infantry Battalions
- 1st Artillery Unit
- Engineer Unit
- AA Gun Unit
- Signal Unit
- 11th Independent Mixed Regiment (1,366 men)
- 9th Independent Engineer Regiment (483 men)
- 58th Anchorage HQ
- Total: 16,737 men
- Tank unit had no tanks, because the transport ship was sunk by air raid.

== Japanese Yap Island Detachment ==
=== Yap Island Fortress ===
==== Japanese Army units ====
- 49th Independent Mix Brigade (4,066 men), Colonel Daihachi Itoh
- Brigade HQ
- 323rd to 330th Independent Infantry Battalions
- Artillery Unit (8 Type 95 75 mm Field Guns, 14 Type 91 100 mm Howitzers)
- AA Gun Unit (4 Type 88 75 mm AA Guns)
- Engineer Unit
- Signal Unit
- Special Field Hospital
- Total: 4,423 men

==== Japanese Navy units ====
- 46th Guard Unit (1,000 men), Captain Masamichi Tanaka
- 205th Construction Unit (1,000 men)
- Total: 1,494 men
- 49th Independent Mix Brigade was reorganized in May 1944, from the 4th Detachment Unit (from 12th Division) on Yap Island. The last Japanese garrison surrendered at Fais Island in the Yap group.

== Palau Island Detachment ==
=== Palau District Group ===
- Under 14th Division Commander
- LtGen Sadao Inoue
- nucleus: 14th Division
- 49th and 53rd Independent Mixed Brigades.

== Palau Islands (Peleliu) Unit ==
There were 10,700 Japanese defenders under Colonel Kunio Nakagawa

- Tank Unit/14th Division-Captain Amano

=== Babelthuap Island Fortress (Palau Islands) ===
==== Japanese Army units ====
- 14th Division - Lieutenant-General Sadao Inoue
- 53rd Independent Mixed Brigade (6,000 men), Major-General Takeo Yamaguchi
- 347th to 351st Independent Infantry Battalions
- Artillery Unit
- Engineer Unit
- Transport Unit/1st Sea-Mobile Brigade (1,338 men)
- Tank Unit/6th South-Seas Detachment (7 Light Tanks)
- Palau Branch of 3rd Ship Transport HQ (1,480 men)
- 57th Line of Communication Area Unit (753 men)
- Total: 21,449 men

==== Japanese Navy units ====
- 30th Special Base Force (2,500 men), Vice-Admiral Kenmi Itoh
- Total: 8,286 men
- Less 2nd Infantry Regiment, 1st Battalion/59th Infantry Regiment, Tank Unit.

== Mariana Islands Unit ==
- Mariana Islands unit (Saipan and Tinian)

=== Commanders in Mariana Islands Units ===
Saipan was defended by 29,662 Japanese army and navy troops under Lt. General Yoshitsuga Saito and Admiral Chuichi Nagumo

== Northern Mariana District Group ==
=== Saipan and Tinian Island area ===
- under 43rd Division Commander, LtGen Yoshitsugu Saito
- nucleus: 43rd Division,
- 47th Independent Mixed Brigade.
- 5th Infantry Regiment(Tinian Island), Colonel Keishi Ogata
- 9th Tank Regiment(Saipan), Colonel Goshima
- Yokosuka 1st SNLF
- 55th Guard Unit
- Tank Unit/18th Infantry Regiment(Tinian), First Lieut. Sikamura
- Artillery Unit/47th Independent Mixed Brigade, Captain Yamane
- 3rd Independent Mountain Gun Regiment, Lt.Col. Nakajima
- Artillery Battalion/135th Infantry Regiment, Major Aikawa
- Artillery Battalion/136th Infantry Regiment, Major Yabuki

==== Japanese Navy units ====
- Navy Artillery
- 4 200 mm Naval Guns
- 14 150 mm Naval Guns
- 3 140 mm Naval Guns
- 4 120 mm Naval Guns
- 4 80 mm Naval Guns

=== Pagan Island Fortress ===
==== Japanese Army units ====
- 9th Independent Mixed Regiment (1,995 men), Colonel Umahachi Tenba
- Total: 2,150 men

==== Japanese Navy units ====
- Guard unit (300 men). The unit is unknown.
- Total: 344 men

=== Rota Island Fortress ===
==== Japanese Army units ====
- 10th Independent Mixed Brigade (947 men), Major Shigeo Imagawa
- Total: 1,031 men

==== Japanese Navy unit ====
- Detachment of 41st Guard Unit (600 men). It was detached from 56th Guard Unit on Tinian. After destruction of 56th Guard Unit, the command of the detachment on Rota was changed to 41st Guard Unit on Truk.
- Total: 1,954 men

== Southern Marianas District Group ==
The Japanese defenders of this largest Marianas group island numbered some 19,000 troops under Lt. General Hyo Takashina

=== Guam Island area ===
- 29th Division Commander, LtGen Hyo Takashina
- Units:
- 29th Division
- 48th Independent Mixed Brigade.
- 1st Company/9th Tank Regiment, First Lieut. Sachi
- 2nd Company/9th Tank Regiment, Captain Tsunenari Sato
- Tank Unit/29th Division, Captain Hideo Sato

== Japanese detachment in Makin Atoll (1943) ==
=== Butaritari Fortress ===
==== Japanese Navy units ====
- 5th Special Base Force (Makin detachment), Lt.j.g. Seizo Ishikawa
- 3rd Special Base Force (Makin detachment)
- Makin Armor Detachment of 3rd Special Base Force (3 Type 95 Light Tanks)
- Total: 284 troops
- Aviation Personnel
- Total: 100 units
- 4th Fleet Construction Unit

Total: 276 men

All units complete the total of: 798 men under command of Lieutenant j.g. Seizo Ishikawa. Most of aviation or labor units had no combat training and were not assigned weapons or a battle station, also the number of actual armed combat troops on Makin was no more than 300 men.

- Makin Naval Base:

A surface vessel and submarine port, with naval coastal defenses, possessed capacity to receive some Kawanishi H8K "Emily" flying boat bombers, Nakajima A6M2-N "Rufe" hydrofighters and Aichi E13A1 "Jake" recon-hydroplanes.

== Nauru Island Detachment ==
=== Nauru Island Fortress ===
==== Japanese Navy units ====
- 67th Guard Unit (1,367 men), Captain Hisayuki Soeda
- Yokosuka 2nd SNLF (769 men)
- Nauru Special Construction Unit/4th Construction
- Department (2,120 men)
- Total: 4,256 men

==== Equipment ====
- 4 150 mm Naval Guns
- 4 80 mm Naval Guns
- 4 Twin 127 mm AA Guns
- 12 25 mm MGs
- 10 130 mm MGs

== Ocean Island Unit ==
=== Ocean Island Fortress ===
==== Japanese Navy unit ====
- Ocean Detachment of 67th Guard Unit (760 men)

== Gilbert Islands Detachment ==
=== Tarawa Atoll Fortress ===
==== Japanese Navy units ====
Makin, Apamama, Betio, and Tarawa Atolls

- Special Naval Landing-Rear Admiral Keiji Shimbasaka
- Sasebo 7th Special Naval Landing Force (2,619 men at command of Rear-Admiral Takeo Sugai) also 4,800 naval troops.
- Tank Unit/Sasebo 7th SNLF (14 Type 95 Light Tanks) Commanded by Ensign Ohtani

== Wake Island Detachment ==
=== Wake Island Fortress ===
==== Japanese Navy units ====
- 65th Guard Unit (2,000 men), Captain Shigematsu Sakaibara
- Total: 2,200 men

==== Equipment ====
- 4 twin 127 mm AA guns
- 4 80 mm AA guns
- 5 captured US 3-inch AA guns
- 2 captured US 5-inch naval guns
- 4 200 mm naval guns
- 4 150 mm naval guns
- 8 120 mm naval guns

==== Japanese Army units ====
- 13th Independent Mixed Regiment (1,939 men), Colonel Shigeji Chikamori
- Regimental HQ
- 1st Battalion
- 2nd Battalion
- Artillery Company
- 1st Tank Unit
- 2nd Tank Unit

==== Equipment ====
- 11 37 mm AT guns
- 4 47 mm AT guns
- 3 regimental guns
- 4 field guns
- 5 infantry guns
- 9 Type 95 Light Tanks
- 4 captured US 3-inch AA guns
- 4 captured US 5-inch naval guns
- Total: 1,939 men
- 13th Independent Mixed Regiment was reorganized in May 1944, from the following units on Wake Island; 3rd South-Sea Garrison Unit, 1st Battalion/5th Independent Mixed Regiment and 16th Tank Regiment.

== Marcus Island Detachment ==
=== Marcus Island Fortress ===
==== Japanese Navy units ====
- Minami-tori-shima Guard Unit-Rear-Admiral Masata Matsubara
- Total: 742 men

==== Japanese Army units ====
- 12th Independent Mixed Regiment, Colonel Yoshiichi Sakata
- Three Infantry Battalions
- Field Gun Company (3 Type 38 75 mm Field Guns)
- Tank Company (9 Type 95 Light Tanks)
- Signal Company
- Total: 2,005 men

== Ogasawara Island Detachment ==
=== Ogasawara (Bonins) District Group ===
==== Japanese Army units ====
- Under 109th Division Commander (LtGen Tadamichi Kuribayashi)
- Nucleus: 109th Division (Iwo Jima)
- Lieut. Colonel Nishi led 26th Tank Regiment
- 2nd Mixed Brigade Artillery Group HQ, Col. Kaido
- Artillery Unit/2nd Mixed Brigade, Major Maeda
- Artillery Battalion/145th Infantry Regiment, Captain Matsuda
- 20th Independent Mortar Battalion, Captain Mizutari
- 2nd Middle Infantry Mortar Battalion, Major Nakao
- 3rd Middle Infantry Mortar Battalion, Major Kobayashi
- Rocket Artillery Company, 1st Lt. Yokoyama
- 1st Independent Infantry Mortar Company, 1st Lt. Yamaki
- Artillery Company/26th Tank Regiment, 1st Lt. Kishi

==== Japanese Navy units ====
- Navy Artillery
- 4 150 mm Naval Guns
- 4 140 mm Naval Guns
- 7 120 mm Naval Guns
- 8 120 mm Short Naval Guns
