= Saipan Katori Shrine =

Shintō shrine in Sugar King Park, Garapan, Saipan

Coordinates: 15°12′06″N 145°43′19″E

Saipan Katori Shrine 彩帆香取神社
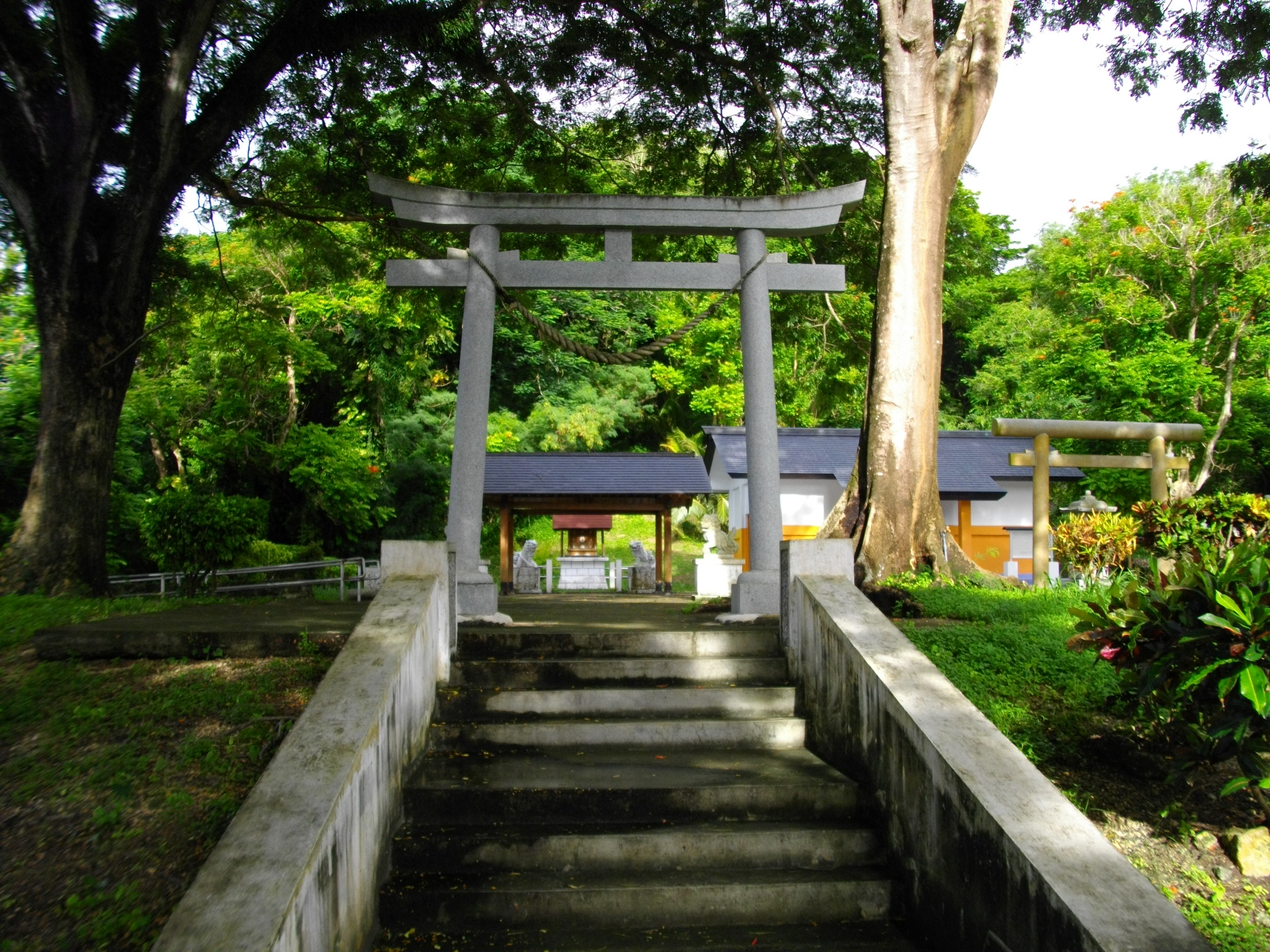
- Torii at the entrance of the shrine

Religion
- Affiliation: Shinto
- Festival: Autumn Festival (October)

Location
- Location: Sugar King Park, Saipan, Northern Marianas Islands
- Interactive map of Saipan Katori Shrine 彩帆香取神社

Architecture
- Established: 1914

The Saipan Katori Shrine (彩帆香取神社, Saipan Katori Jinja) is a Shintō shrine in Sugar King Park, Garapan, Saipan. The main festival of the shrine is held annually in October. Ceremonies are conducted by the Japanese Society of Northern Marianas and presided over by priests of the Katori Shrine in Chiba Prefecture, Japan. The shrine is a place of prayer for peace and prosperity. It is listed on the Garapan Heritage Trail, a project of the Northern Marianas Humanities Council with financial support by the National Endowment for the Humanities and the Office of Insular Affairs, United States Department of the Interior.

== History ==
The shrine was built by the Imperial Japanese Navy in 1914 after it bloodlessly captured the island in the Asian and Pacific theatre of World War I. It was named after the battleship Katori, which was used to capture Saipan and named in honor of the Katori Shrine in Chiba Prefecture, Japan. The portable shrine aboard the Katori housed a sacred repository object (goshintai) where the spirit of Futsunushi resided. A piece of the goshintai was taken from the battleship after a "dividing of spirit" rite and was enshrined on the island. It burned down during the Battle of Saipan in 1944.

The Katori Shrine Association of Japan, with the support of the CNMI government, rebuilt the shrine in 1985. The shrine was damaged by typhoons in the past. In October 2016, it was vandalized. The CNMI government and non-profit organizations have funded the restoration the shrine over the decades.

== Structures ==
The shrine has torii, komainu, tōrō, a chōzuya, and a honden.
