= Sugar Dock (Saipan) =

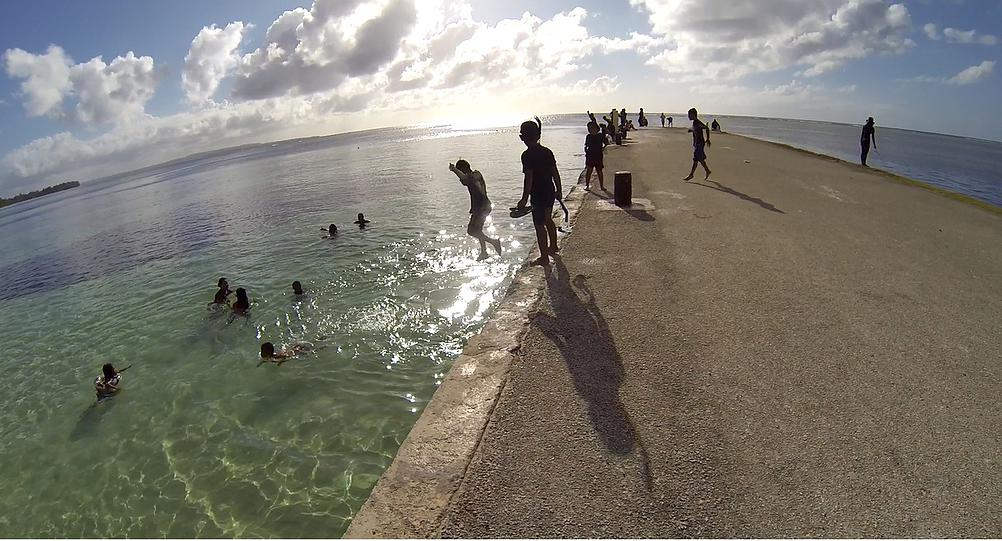

Location
- Location: Chalan Kanoa, Saipan, Northern Mariana Islands

Details
- Opened: 1930s

The Sugar Dock is a structure at the edge of Chalan Kanoa, Saipan, extending out from the western shore of the island into the Philippine Sea in the western North Pacific Ocean. Aquatic plants, including sea grass, grow around the dock. The dock was built by the South Seas Development Company to support the sugar industry during the Japanese period in the Northern Mariana Islands. American forces captured the dock during the Battle of Saipan and used it for logistics during and after the Asia-Pacific War.

School groups, community organizations, and government agencies conduct cleanups at the dock. Trees nearby were lost during Typhoon Soudelor in 2015 and Typhoon Yutu in 2018. The Micronesian Islands Nature Alliance (MINA) host an annual tree planting campaign near the area.

The structure is ruined and crumbling. It poses a safety hazard. The dock pier may be rebuilt by the CNMI government in the 2020s. The dock is a place for boats to tie up and a favorite swimming-hole of islanders. People have drowned near the dock. In 2022, two teenagers swept by a current near the Sugar dock, a passerby who happened by an off-duty lifeguard went in after them with some life jackets placed on the dock and was able to rescue them.

In 2014, part of the outer dock collapsed due to coastal erosion and waves, and it was partially closed off. Eventually in the 2010s plans were made to repair the dock, taking into account safety, historical, and community considerations. As of 2022, plans were in place to repair the dock in 2023 and also work on a boat ramp. In 2023 a public notice was issued about plans for the Sugar Dock and boat ramp rebuilding plan.

There is a wood Pavilion near the sugar dock, and the area has been the focus on several local community organizations. The sugar dock pavilion, made of wood had been there for over 30 years and was refurbished in 2022.
