= Japanese Army Headquarters (Tonowas) =

- U.S. National Register of Historic Places
- Location within Federated States of Micronesia
- Location: Roro, Tonowas, Chuuk State, Federated States of Micronesia
- Coordinates: 7°22′46″N 151°52′40″E
- Area: 3 acres (1.2 ha)
- NRHP reference No.: 76002208
- Added to NRHP: September 30, 1976

The World War II Japanese Army Headquarters for the defense of Tonowas, an island in what is now Chuuk State in the Federated States of Micronesia, was located in an underground bunker in the village of Roro. The underground facilities, including an office, communications center, print shop, supply room, and health clinic, were built in response to American air raids against the facilities, which were associated with the major naval facility of the Imperial Japanese Navy in Chuuk Lagoon.

The facilities were listed on the United States National Register of Historic Places in 1976, a time when the region was part of the US-administered Trust Territory of the Pacific Islands.
