= Garapan Heritage Trail =

- Location: Garapan, Saipan, Northern Mariana Islands
- Established: 2019
- Use: walking, self-guided tours
- Website: garapanheritagetrail.com/index.html

The Garapan Heritage Trail is located in Garapan, Saipan, Northern Mariana Islands. The cultural heritage trail project is supported through grants awarded to the Northern Marianas Humanities Council by the National Endowment for the Humanities and the Office of Insular Affairs, United States Department of the Interior.

The trail has twenty historical sites from the prehistoric, Spanish, German, and Japanese periods in the Northern Mariana Islands: 1) Mañagaha/Ghalaghal Islet; 2) Puntan Muchot/Ppiyal Ooláng; 3) Japanese Cannon Blockhouse; 4) Japanese Machine Gun Bunker; 5) American Memorial Park; 6) Japanese Hôan-den; 7) Nan’yô-ji Gatepost; 8) Latte Stone Monument; 9) Carolinian Utt; 10) Nambô Pier; 11) Garapan Dock; 12) Japanese Bunker; 13) Catholic Church Bell Tower; 14) Administration Hill; 15) old Japanese hospital/NMI Museum of History and Culture; 16) Sugar Train Locomotive; 17) Haruji Matsue Statue; 18) Saipan Jinja/Shinto shrine; 19) German Steps; 20) Japanese Jail. More sites may be added in the future. Historical sites on private property are not listed on the trail.

The trail map is in English, Japanese, Korean, Chinese, and Russian. The Marianas Visitors Authority built signs for the sites in four languages. A free mobile phone app with GPS assistance features tour sites.

== History ==
Between 2012 and 2019, the Northern Marianas Humanities Council identified and mapped historically significant sites in the Garapan area, compiling and translating significant facts, and developing a related website. The trail opened in October 2019.

In January 2020, Tan Holdings Corporation executives and employees toured the trail and the Tan Siu Lin Foundation of the corporation donated to the NMI Museum of History and Culture.
