= Grace Christian Academy (Northern Mariana Islands) =

Location
- Navy Hill Road, Garapan, Saipan 96950, CNMI; Saipan; Northern Mariana Islands
- Coordinates: 15.2075248°N 145.7284138°E

Information
- Website: gca-nmi.com

Grace Christian Academy is a private Christian school in Garapan, Saipan, Northern Mariana Islands. It serves grades Kindergarten through grade 12.
