= South Seas Mandate =

Japanese mandate territory (1919–1947)

Coordinates: 07°20′30″N 134°28′19″E

Japanese Mandate for the Governance of the South Seas Islands: 委任統治地域南洋群島 (Japanese); Inin tōchi chiiki nan'yō guntō (rōmaji)
- 1919–1947
- Flag Imperial Seal

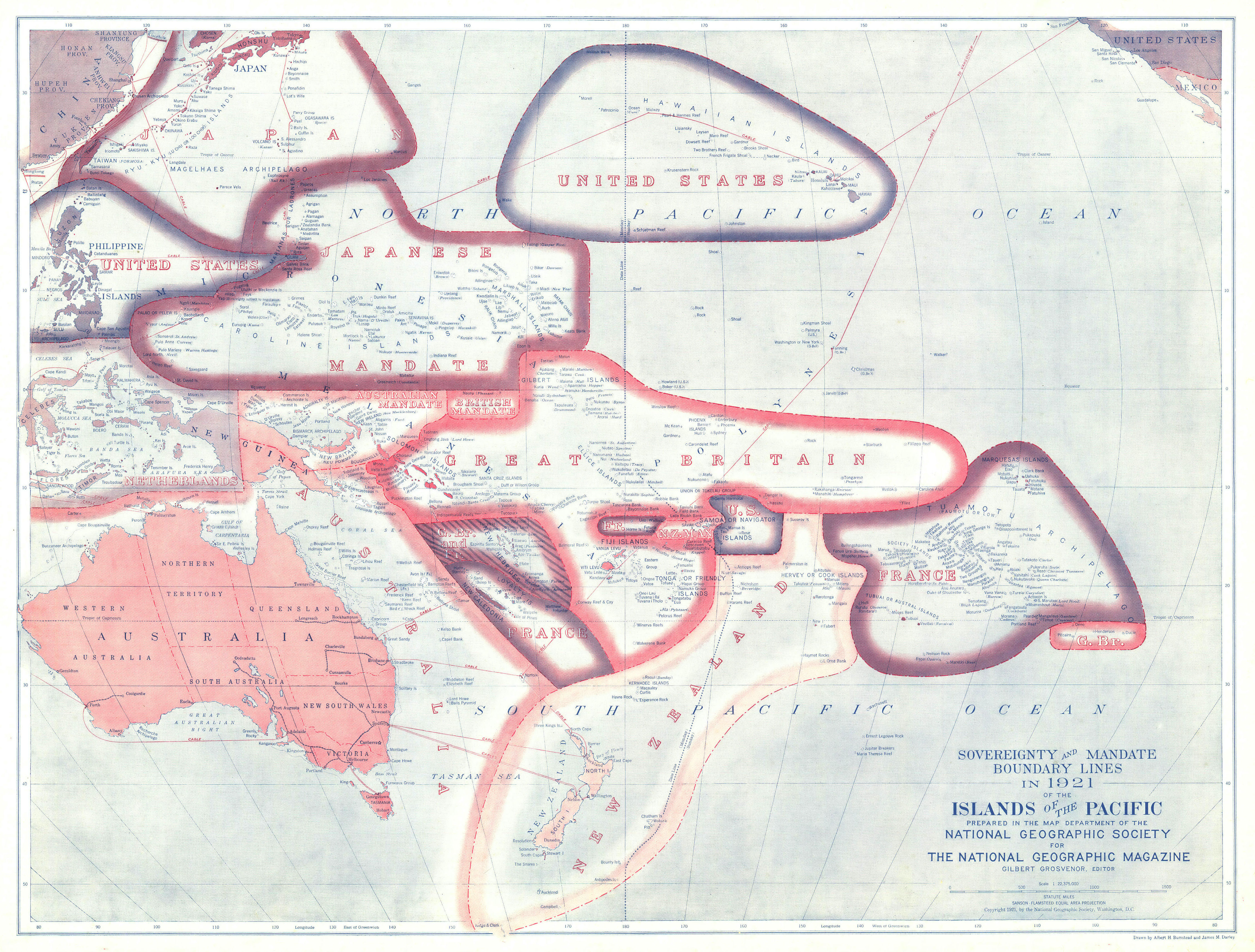
- 1921 National Geographic: a map showing areas of political control in the Pacific. One area is described as the "Japanese Mandate".
- Status: Occupied by Japan (1919-1920); Class C League of Nations mandate of Japan (1920-1947)
- Capital: Koror City
- Common languages: Japanese (official); Austronesian languages
- Emperor
  - 1914–1926: Taishō (Yoshihito)
  - 1926–1946: Shōwa (Hirohito)
- Director
  - 1919–1923 (first): Toshiro Tezuka
  - 1943–1946 (last): Boshirō Hosogaya
- Historical era: Empire of Japan
  - Treaty of Versailles: 28 June 1919
  - Pacific Islands Trusteeship: 18 July 1947
- Currency: Yen, Oceanian pound
Preceded by	Succeeded by
German New Guinea	Trust Territory of the Pacific Islands
- Today part of: Palau; Marshall Islands; Micronesia; United States Northern Mariana Islands

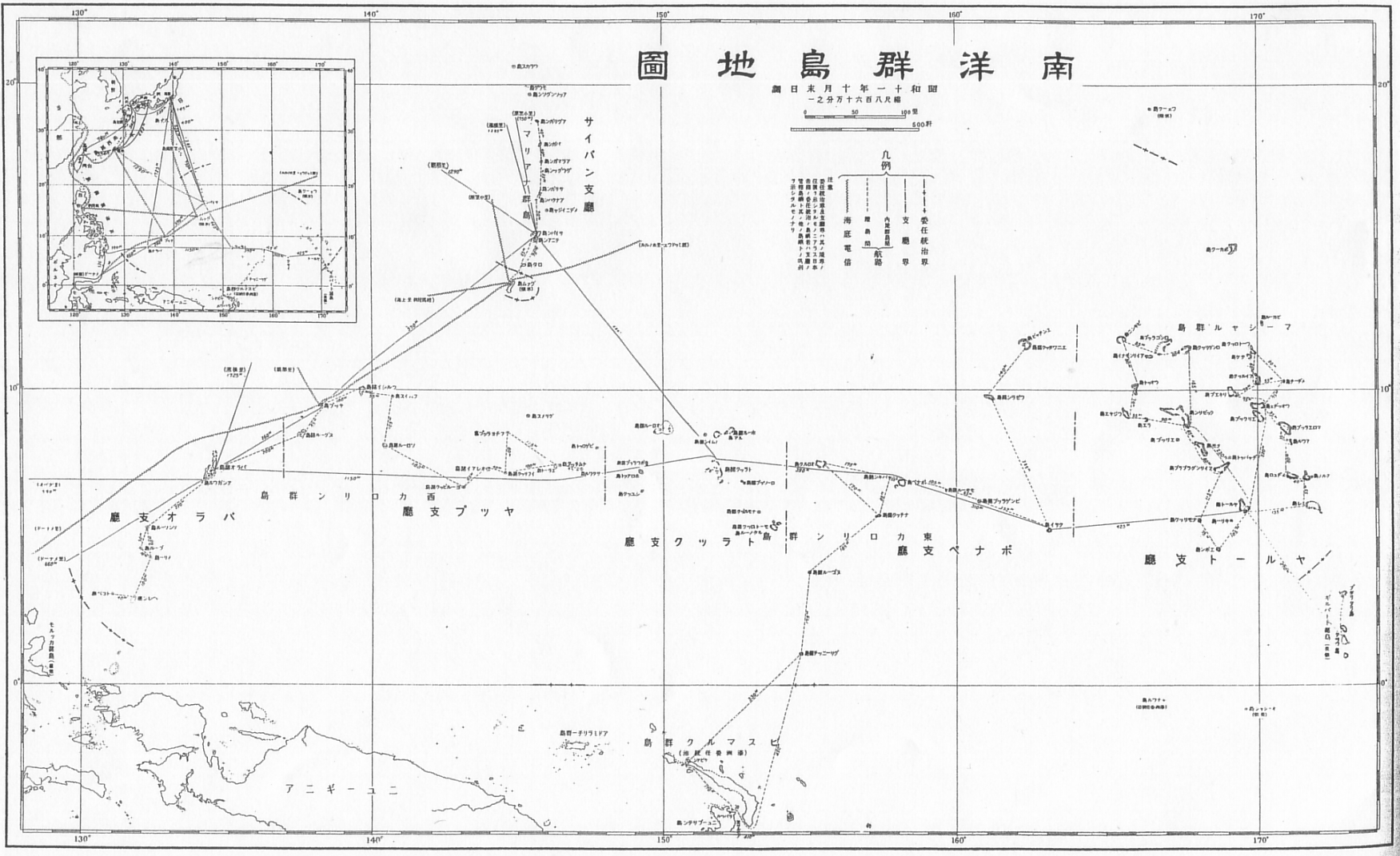
Japanese map of the mandate area in the 1930s

The South Seas Mandate was a League of Nations mandate given to the Empire of Japan by the League of Nations following World War I. The mandate consisted of islands in the north Pacific Ocean that had been part of German New Guinea within the German colonial empire, in a part of the world broadly known as the South Seas. The islands were occupied by Japan during World War I, and Japan subsequently governed them under the mandate as part of the Japanese colonial empire. During World War II the United States captured the islands, and after the war the United Nations revoked the mandate and established in its place the Trust Territory of the Pacific Islands which was governed by the United States. The islands are now part of Palau, the Northern Mariana Islands, the Federated States of Micronesia, and the Republic of the Marshall Islands.

The mandate's official name was the Mandate for the German Possessions in the Pacific Ocean Lying North of the Equator. In Japan, the territory is known as "Japanese Mandate for the Governance of the South Seas Islands" (委任統治地域南洋群島, Inin tōchi chiiki nan'yō guntō) and was governed by the Nan'yō Government (南洋廳, Nan'yō-chō).

== Origin ==
Japanese interest in what it called the "South Seas" (南洋, Nan'yō) began in the 19th century, prior to its imperial expansion into Korea and China. By 1875, ships from the newly established Imperial Japanese Navy (IJN) began to hold training missions in the area. Shiga Shigetaka, a writer who accompanied a Navy cruise to the region in 1886, published his Current State of Affairs in the South Seas (南洋時事, Nan'yō jiji) in 1887, marking the first time a Japanese civilian published a firsthand account of Micronesia. Three years later, Shiga advocated for annexation of the area by claiming that doing so would "excite an expeditionary spirit in the demoralized Japanese race." Despite the appeal imperialism had for the Japanese public at the time, neither the Meiji government nor the Navy seized any pretexts to fulfill this popular aspiration. It was through the commercial operations of fishermen and traders that the Japanese first began to make a wider presence in the region, which continued to grow despite challenges from competing German commercial interests. Although the Japanese public's enthusiasm for southward expansion had abated by the turn of the century, a number of important intellectuals, businessmen, and military officials continued to advocate for it; among them were Admiral Satō Tetsutarō and Diet member Takekoshi Yosaburō. The latter declared that the future of Japan "lies not in the north, but in the south, not on the continent, but on the ocean" and that its "great task" was to "turn the Pacific into a Japanese lake."

By the outbreak of World War I the empire included Taiwan, Korea, the Ryukyu Islands, the southern half of Sakhalin (Karafuto Prefecture), the Kuril Islands, and Port Arthur (Kwantung Leased Territory). The policy of Nanshin-ron ("Southern Expansion Doctrine"), popular with the IJN, held that Southeast Asia and the Pacific Islands were the area of greatest potential value to the Japanese Empire for economic and territorial expansion.

The Anglo-Japanese Alliance of 1902 had been signed primarily to serve Britain's and Japan's common interest of opposing Russian expansion. Amongst other provisions the treaty called on each party to support the other in a war against more than one power, although it did not require a signatory state to go to war to aid the other. Within hours of Britain's declaration of war on Germany in 1914, Japan invoked the treaty and offered to declare war on the German Empire if it could take German territories in China and the South Pacific. The British government officially asked Japan for assistance in destroying the raiders from the Imperial German Navy in and around Chinese waters, and Japan sent Germany an ultimatum demanding that it vacate China and the Marshall, Marianas and Caroline Islands. The ultimatum went unanswered and Japan formally declared war on Germany on 23 August 1914.

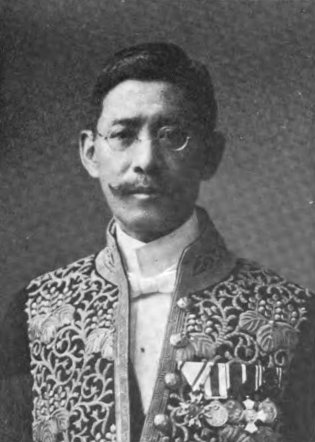
Tezuka Toshirō, the first governor of the South Seas Mandate

Japan participated in a joint operation with British forces in autumn 1914 in the Siege of Tsingtao (Qingdao) to capture the Kiautschou Bay Leased Territory in China's Shandong Province. The Japanese Navy was tasked with pursuing and destroying the German East Asia Squadron and protection of the shipping lanes for Allied commerce in the Pacific and Indian Oceans. During the course of this operation, the Japanese Navy seized the German possessions in the Marianas, Carolines, Marshall Islands and Palau groups by October 1914.

After the end of World War I, the protectorate of German New Guinea was divided amongst the war's victors by the Treaty of Versailles. The southern part of the protectorate was mandated to come under Australian administration as the Territory of New Guinea, consisting of Kaiser-Wilhelmsland (the German territory on the island of New Guinea) and the German-controlled islands south of the equator. Meanwhile, Japanese occupation of the northern part of the protectorate, consisting of the Micronesian islands north of the equator, was formally recognized by the treaty. Japan was given a League of Nations Class C mandate to govern them, the C Class being assigned because the Mandates Commission regarded the islands as having "low cultural, economic and political development". The terms of the Mandate specified that the islands should be demilitarized and Japan should not extend its influence further into the Pacific. The Mandate was initially subject to yearly scrutiny by the Permanent Mandates Commission of the League of Nations in Geneva, though by the late 1920s Tokyo was rejecting requests for official visitation or international inspection. In 1933 Japan gave notice of withdrawal from the League of Nations, the withdrawal becoming effective two years later. As there was no legal requirement for Japan to be a League member for it to have a mandate over the islands, it continued to administer them and submitted annual reports to the League until the outbreak of World War II. The idea of reassigning the mandate was considered by the League and the great powers but proved to be impractical.

== Administration ==
Flag of the Governor of the Mandate

Following the initial Japanese occupation of the islands, a policy of secrecy was adopted. Japan made it plain that it did not welcome the entry of foreign ships, even those of its wartime allies, into Micronesian waters. During the first five years that Japan occupied the islands, it consolidated its presence and the islands became a virtual Japanese colony. The IJN divided the territory into five naval districts in Palau, Saipan, Truk, Ponape and Jaluit Atoll, all reporting to a rear admiral at the naval headquarters at Truk.

A proposal at the Versailles Conference to allow trade and migration between those islands to be administered by Japan and those to be administered by Australia and New Zealand was rejected. Japan was able to continue administering the islands as if they were colonial possessions, keeping their waters off-limits to foreigners. When the islands became legally a League of Nations Mandate, their Class C status gave Japan direct control over their domestic legal system. Japan administered them as Japanese territory and as part of the Japanese Empire. This situation continued even after Japan withdrew from the League of Nations in 1935 and lost its legal claim to administer the islands.

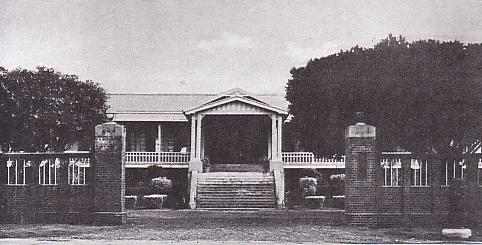
Headquarters of the government of the South Seas Mandate in Saipan

Militarily and economically, Saipan, in the Marianas archipelago, was the most important island in the South Seas Mandate and became the center of subsequent Japanese settlement. The towns of Garapan (on Saipan), Koror (on Palau) and Colony (on Ponape) were developed to resemble small towns in Japan, with cinemas, restaurants, beauty parlors and geisha houses. Another important island was Truk in the Carolines archipelago, which was fortified into a major navy base by the IJN.

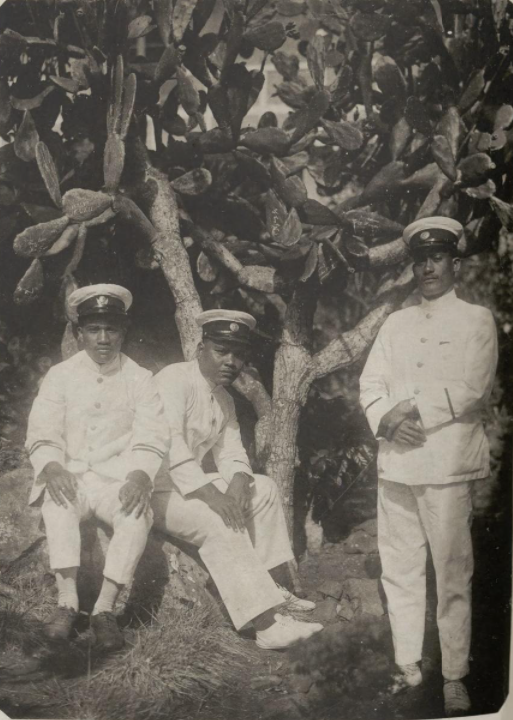
Native Micronesian teaching assistant (left) and constables (middle and right) of Japanese Truk Island, c. 1930. Truk became a possession of the Empire of Japan under a mandate from the League of Nations following Germany's defeat in World War I.

Between 1914 and 1920 the islands began the slow transition from naval to civilian administration. By 1920 all authority had been transferred from the Naval Defense Force to the Civil Affairs Bureau which was directly responsible to the Navy Ministry. Initially based in Truk, the Civil Affairs Bureau was moved to Koror in the Palau islands in 1921. The naval garrisons were disbanded to comply with the terms of the Mandate. In April 1922 a civilian government was established in each of the six administrative districts (Saipan, Palau, Yap, Truk, Ponape and Jaluit) in the form of a civil administration department which still reported to the local naval garrison commander. At the same time a post of Governor of the South Seas Mandate was created. Governors were mostly admirals or vice-admirals as the administration was initially still the responsibility of the IJN. The Governor reported directly to the Prime Minister of Japan. After the establishment of the Ministry of Colonial Affairs in June 1929, the Governor reported to the Minister of Colonial Affairs instead. The establishment of the "South Seas Government" or "Nan'yō-chō" in March 1932 finally put the government of the islands under a purely civilian administration. When the Ministry of Colonial Affairs was absorbed into the Ministry of Greater East Asia in November 1942, the primacy of the IJN was again recognized by the appointment of an admiral as the Governor. Furthermore, the six administrative districts were reduced to three in November 1943: North, East, and West.

== Significance ==
The population of the South Seas Mandate was too small to provide significant markets and the indigenous people had very limited financial resources for the purchase of imported goods. The major significance of the territory to the Empire of Japan was its strategic location, which dominated sea lanes across the Pacific Ocean and provided convenient provisioning locations for sailing vessels in need of water, fresh fruit, vegetables and meat.

As a signatory of the 1922 Washington Naval Treaty, Japan agreed not to build new naval and air stations on the islands and it did not begin direct military preparations in the Mandate until the late 1930s. Nevertheless, the territory provided important coaling stations for steam-powered vessels and its possession gave an impetus to the Nanshin-ron doctrine of "southward advance".

== Population ==
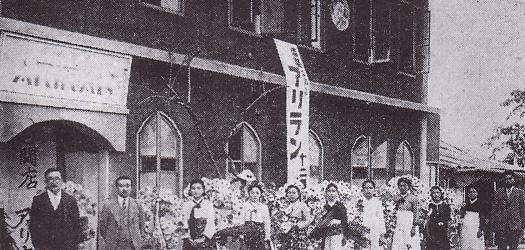
Korean Cafe in Saipan, 1939. The banner spells Arirang in katakana.

The population of the islands increased during the period of the mandate as a result of Japanese settlement in Micronesia. Settlers were initially drawn from Okinawa Island and the other Ryukyu Islands, but immigrants subsequently came from other parts of Japan, particularly the economically deprived Tōhoku region. Agricultural workers were followed by shopkeepers, restaurant, geisha house and brothel-keepers, expanding former German settlements into Japanese boom towns. The initial population figures (1919–1920) for the mandated territories included around 50,000 islanders, made up from the indigenous peoples of Oceania. Japanese immigration led to the population growing from under 4,000 in 1920 to 70,000 inhabitants in 1930, and more than 80,000 in 1933. By 1935 the Japanese population alone was more than 50,000. By 1937 almost 90 percent of the population on Saipan was Japanese (42,547 out of 46,748). In the census of December 1939, the total population was 129,104, of which 77,257 were Japanese (including ethnic Chinese and Koreans), 51,723 indigenous islanders and 124 foreigners. While the settler population was growing, the indigenous Micronesian population in some areas was declining. The rights and status of the indigenous population differed from those of Japanese imperial subjects. Employment prospects for Micronesians were more restricted, with unequal labor conditions and pay.

The government of the Mandate built and maintained hospitals and schools, and free education was provided for Micronesian children aged 8–15. However, Micronesian children attended separate schools from those used by Japanese children, and the schooling provided in them was more limited and of shorter duration. Micronesian children often attended boarding schools where compulsory schooling was used to promote Japanese state religion and Shinto rituals. A Shinto shrine known as the Nan'yō Shrine was established on Koror in 1940. Christian mission schools were prohibited from taking Micronesian pupils where government schools existed.

== Economy ==
Japanese economic involvement in Micronesia began in the late 19th century. In 1890, Japan established commercial relations with some of the Spanish and German firms already trading in the islands. Japan began to exert control over the copra and fishing industries, but this control was lost following the 1899 purchase of the islands by Germany. Small groups of Japanese entrepreneurs continued to establish commercial ventures in German Micronesia that made up a significant proportion of the islands' trade. However, the economic development of the area was hampered by the distances separating the islands, by their small land areas and by their small market sizes. Japan also suffered from the German Imperial policy of expanding German interests there and discriminating against the Japanese.

The mandate initially proved a financial liability for the Japanese government, requiring an annual subsidy from Tokyo. The cash crop of the islands, copra, was used in many commercial products at the time. During the 1920s and 1930s, the Japanese government pursued a policy of encouraging monopolies that paired private initiative with government capital. This strategy was intended to maximize the number of Japanese colonists. Until the late 1930s, the development of the islands was undertaken primarily to assist the Japanese civilian economy.

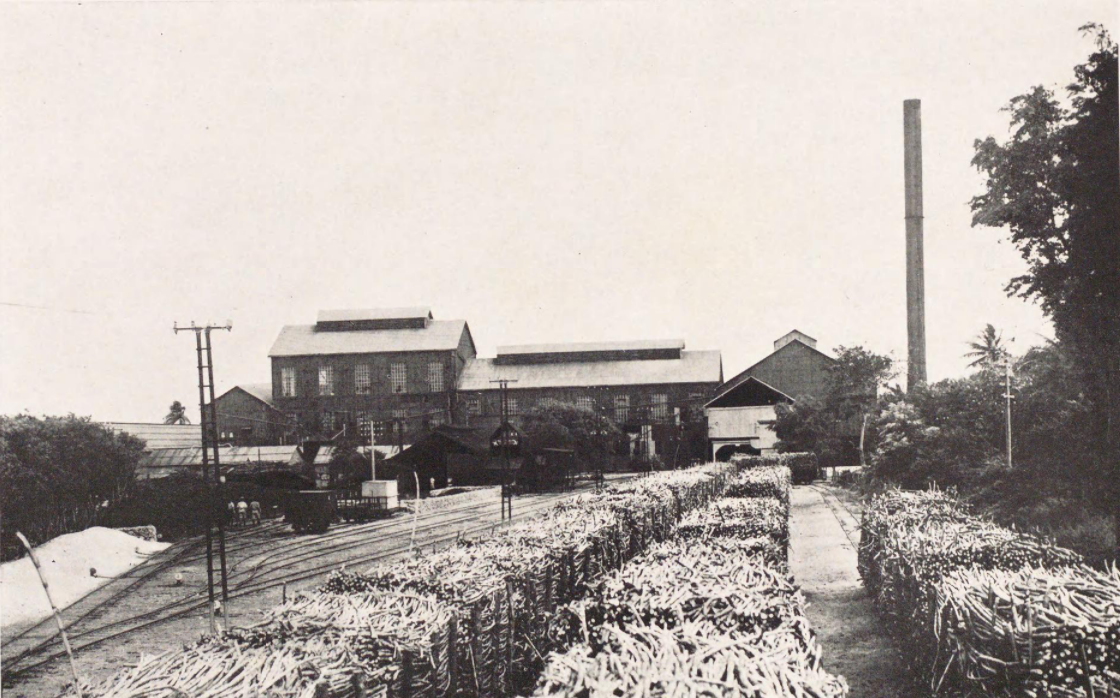
Sugar factory of Nan'yō Kōhatsu, Saipan around 1932

Sugarcane had become increasingly sought after in Japan, and Japanese trading companies led the development of the industry in the islands. The Japanese entrepreneur Haruji Matsue arrived on Saipan in 1920 and formed the South Seas Development Company, which became the largest commercial enterprise in Micronesia. He significantly expanded the quantities of sugar cane produced in the islands, with over 3,000 hectares (7,400 acres) under cultivation by 1925. By the early 1930s the sugar-related industries accounted for more than 60% of the Mandate's revenues. At its peak the company maintained over 11,000 hectares (27,000 acres) of sugar plantations using tenant farmers, as well as operating sugar mills on Saipan, Tinian and Rota. Bananas, pineapples, taro, coconuts, manioc, coffee, rice and other tropical farming products were also grown, putting the islands on a par with Taiwan. The islands also provided bases for the Japanese fishing fleet which was centred at Koror. Fishing formed one of the most profitable industries in the islands. Large fleets of boats were used and fish-processing plants were set up on many islands. Harbor-improvement works were undertaken at Tanaha (Japanese: 棚葉) in Saipan and Malakal Island in Palau in the late 1920s. By the end of the 1920s the Mandate became self-sufficient, no longer needing a subsidy and financially contributing to the Japanese Empire.

The phosphate resources of the islands were exploited by Japanese mining companies, which took over the German phosphate mines on Angaur island and expanded them. Smaller phosphate mines on neighboring islands were also opened. Total exports to Japan eventually reached around 200,000 tonnes per year. Angaur island alone produced some 60,000 tonnes per year. The phosphates were used for farming. Bauxite was another mineral product of the colonial economic structure, although the mineral was only present in the Palau group. The Japanese were also interested in the pearl oyster resources of the islands. Shells were fished and an experimental cultured pearl farm was established in Palau. In 1937 the mother-of-pearl industry became lucrative and large quantities of pearls, both natural and cultured, were extracted from the islands.

From 1915 the South Seas Trading Company had an exclusive contract with the IJN to provide freight, passenger, and mail services to the Empire as well as between the islands. The route between the Empire and the islands was subsequently taken over by the Japanese Mail Steamship Company (Nippon Yusen), the largest steamship line in the Empire. The luxurious amenities offered on board some of the company's vessels brought about the beginning of Japanese tourism to the islands.

The flying boat was the principal type of aircraft used for commercial aviation due to the shortage of flat land available for airfields. Imperial Japanese Airways began some commercial flights in 1935 using the long-range Kawanishi H6K2-L seaplane. Regular commercial flights began in 1940 and a regular service was commenced in 1941. Commercial services ceased shortly after the start of Pacific War, but the widespread network of seaplane bases continued to be used during wartime.

== Pacific War ==
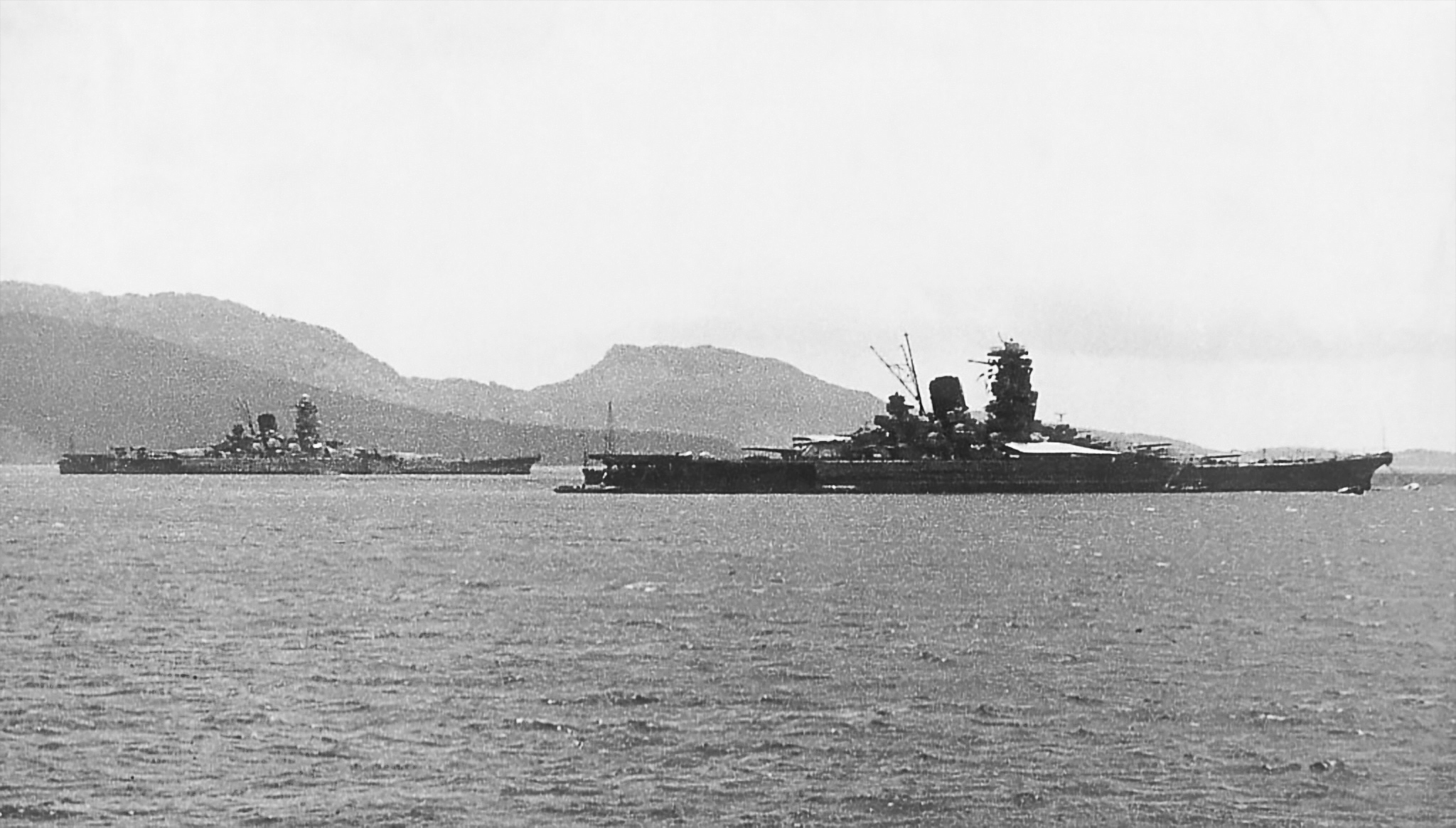
Japanese battleships Yamato and Musashi in anchorage off Truk Islands in 1943

The terms of the mandate required Japan not to fortify the islands. However, these terms were ambiguous and poorly defined, specifying only that Japan should not build "fortifications" or construct "military or naval bases". From 1921 the Japanese military began making surveys and plans so that rapid military deployment to the islands would be possible in case of war.

During the 1930s, the IJN began construction of airfields, fortifications, ports, and other military projects in the islands controlled under the mandate, viewing the islands as "unsinkable aircraft carriers" with a critical role to play in the defense of the Japanese home islands against potential US invasion. These became important staging grounds for Japanese air and naval offensives in the Pacific War.

- Kwajalein Atoll in the Marshall Islands was a major base supporting the attack on Pearl Harbor and the Battle of Wake Island.
- Palau was used to support the invasion of the Philippines by Japan.
- Saipan in the Mariana Islands supported the Battle of Guam.
- Truk in the Caroline Islands became the base for amphibious landings on Tarawa and Makin in the Gilberts during the Japanese occupation of the Gilbert Islands, as well as Rabaul in the Australian mandate Territory of New Guinea.
- Kosrae was used to relocate evacuated Ocean Island workers.
- Majuro in the Marshall Islands was used in air strikes against Howland Island.
- Jaluit Atoll, also in the Marshall Islands, was the base from which the IJN seized Nauru and Ocean Island (now known as Banaba Island).

The Imperial Japanese Army also utilized the islands to support air and land detachments.

In order to capture the islands from Japan, the United States military employed a "leapfrogging" strategy which involved conducting amphibious assaults on selected Japanese island fortresses, subjecting some to air attack only and entirely skipping over others. This strategy caused the Japanese Empire to lose control of its Pacific possessions between 1943 and 1945.

The League of Nations mandate was formally revoked by the United Nations on 18 July 1947 pursuant to Security Council Resolution 21, making the United States responsible for administration of the islands under the terms of a United Nations trusteeship agreement which established the Trust Territory of the Pacific Islands. Most of the islands subsequently became part of independent states.

== See also ==
- Boshirō Hosogaya
- Greater East Asia Co-Prosperity Sphere
- Nanshin-ron (Southern Expansion Doctrine)
- Structure of the Imperial Japanese forces in the South Seas Mandate
- Trust Territory of the Pacific Islands
