= Eten Island =

Island in Chuuk Lagoon

Coordinates: 7.356°N 151.886°E

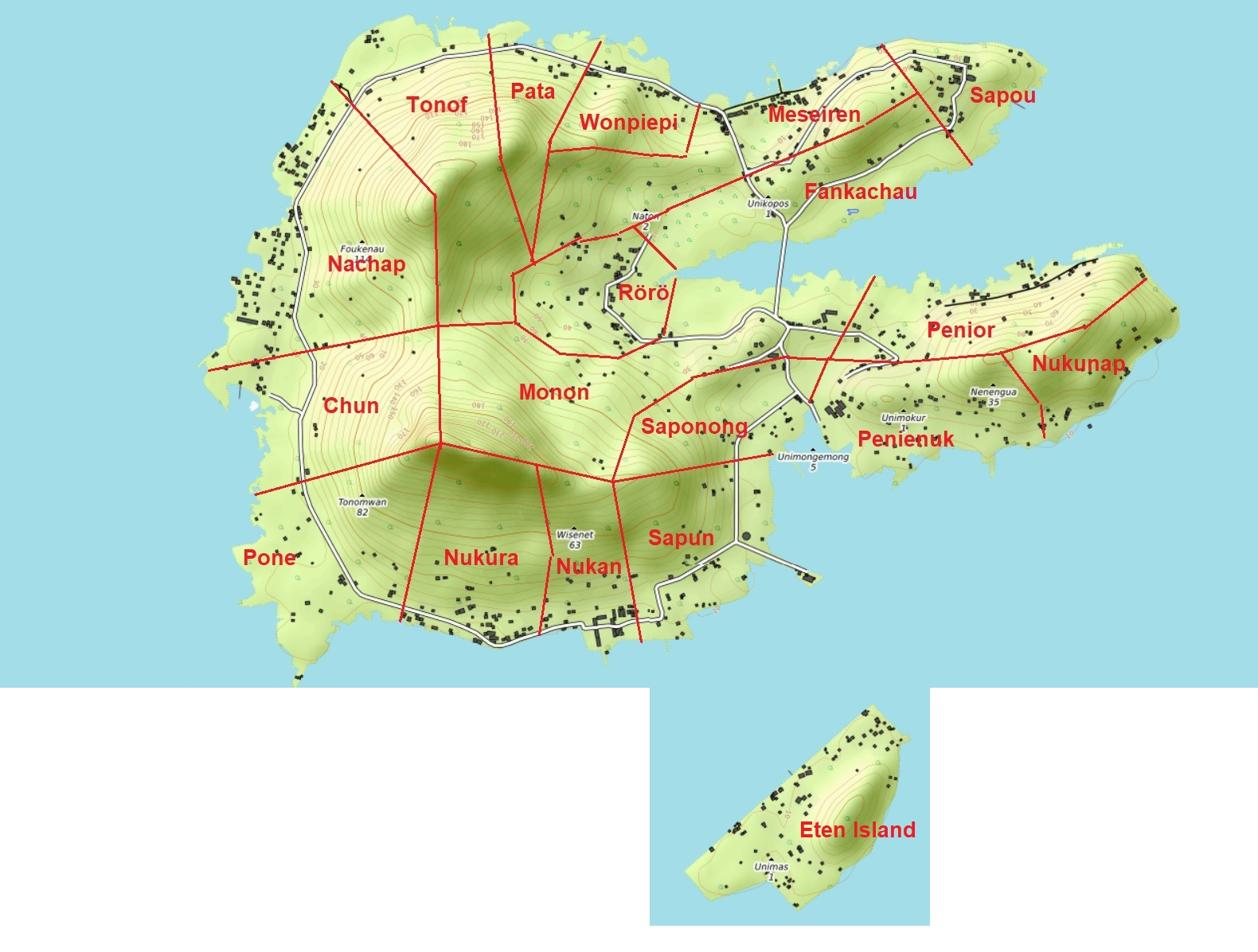
Eten Island as a district of Tonoas (Dublon)

Etten is an island in Chuuk Lagoon (previously known as Truk Lagoon), in the Federated States of Micronesia. It is located 620 meters to the south of Dublon Island and has an area of 52 hectares. It is part of Tonoas (Dublon) municipality, and forms one of Dublon's 19 historical districts.

This small island was bulldozed extensively by Japanese forces — who called it Takeshima — during World War II to turn it into an airstrip. There are remains of military buildings and wrecked aircraft on the island. Visitors can also climb Mount Uinku, which reaches a height of 61 meters.
