= Garapan, Saipan =

Largest village on the island of Saipan

Coordinates: 15°12′22″N 145°43′05″E

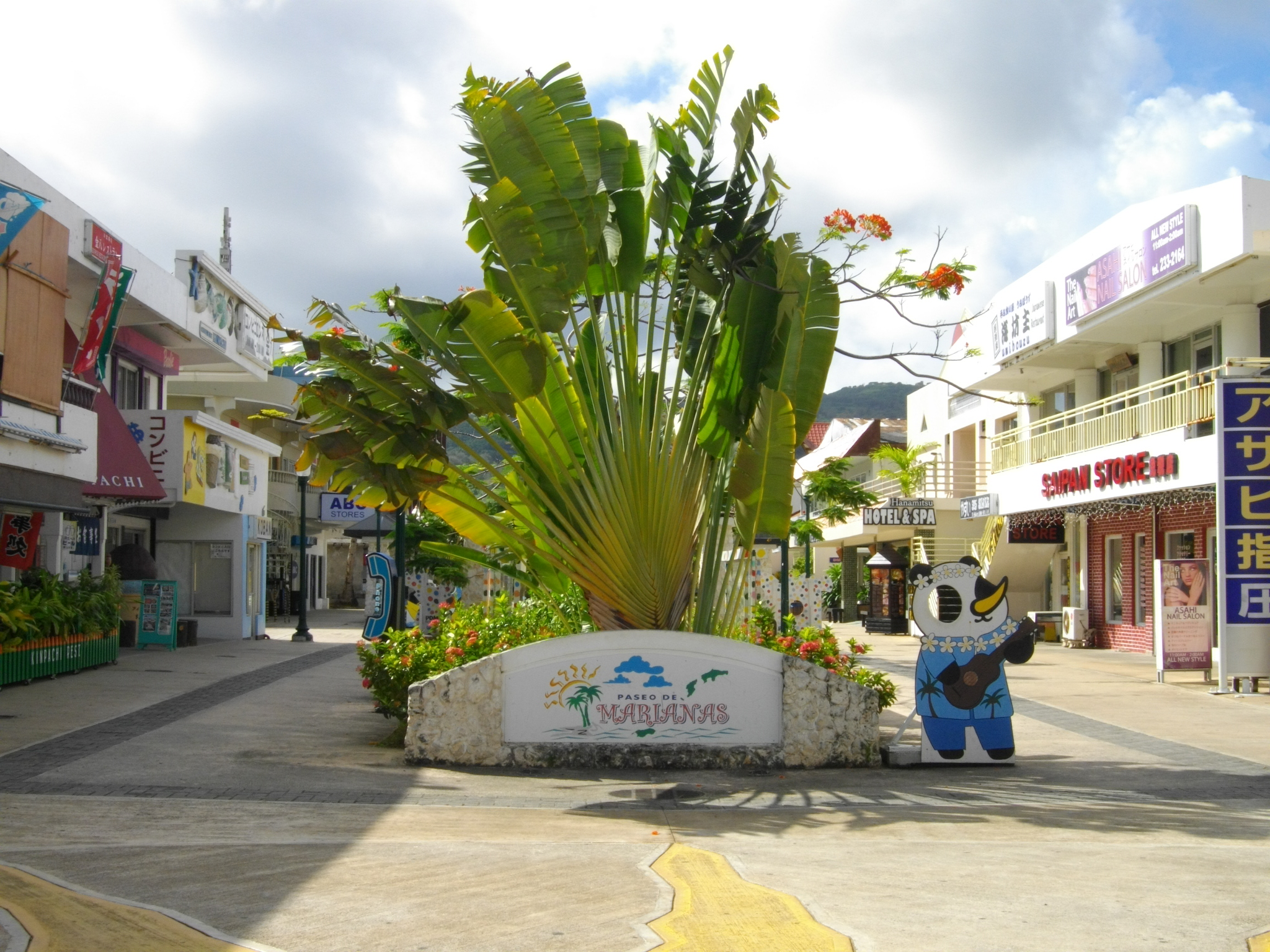
Paseo de Marianas

Garapan (Japanese: 柄帆町, romanized: Garapan-chō) is the largest village and the center of the tourism industry on the island of Saipan, which is a part of the Commonwealth of the Northern Mariana Islands (CNMI). Garapan, as a census-designated place, has an area of 1.2 km^{2} (0.46 sq mi) and a population of 3,096 (census of population, 2020).

== Description ==
Garapan is located on Saipan's west coast and is home to the majority of the island's major hotels and the American Memorial Park, which honors American soldiers who died during the Battle of Saipan. Micro Beach, one of Saipan's more famous beaches, sits adjacent to the American Memorial Park and has turquoise waters with a fine white, sandy shore.

Numerous shops, restaurants, and one of the CNMI's largest elementary schools, Garapan Elementary School, is located here. A popular tourist attraction, Paseo De Marianas (historically known as "Hotel Street"), is also located in Garapan.

One of the several churches on the island, Kristo Rai Church, is located in Garapan, just north of the Horiguchi Building.

== History ==
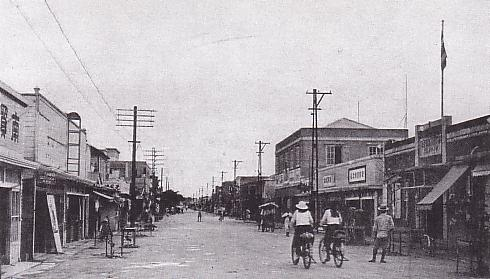
Garapan in the Japanese period

Garapan was a minor settlement during the Spanish colonial period of Saipan, and a location to which the Chamorros forcibly relocated from other islands in the Northern Marianas were housed before being transferred to Guam. The forced transfer of the Chamorros to Guam was completed by 1749 and Saipan was recorded as uninhabited. The village name of Garapan derived from the Refaluwasch (Carolinian) name of Arabwal (Gharabwan), so named for the vine with heart-shaped leaves found along the beach there by a group from Satawal who arrived here to settle around the year 1815. Between the years 1865 and 1869, the Hispanicized descendants of the Chamorros that were forcibly relocated to Guam started a settlement in this area, although apart from the Refaluwasch (Carolinian) community. During the German colonial period (1898-1914) a road was built connecting Garapan with Tanapag. The village was selected by the Empire of Japan when Japan acquired the South Seas Mandate from the League of Nations in 1920 to be the capital of their holdings in the Mariana Islands. Under the Nan'yō Kōhatsu kabushiki gaisha the town grew rapidly with a school, hospital, courthouse, bank, newspaper offices, cinema, and numerous public buildings constructed. By the mid-1930s, Garapan had a population of approximately 14,000, mostly Japanese and ethnic Koreans, Taiwanese and Okinawans, and was nicknamed the "Tokyo of the South Seas".

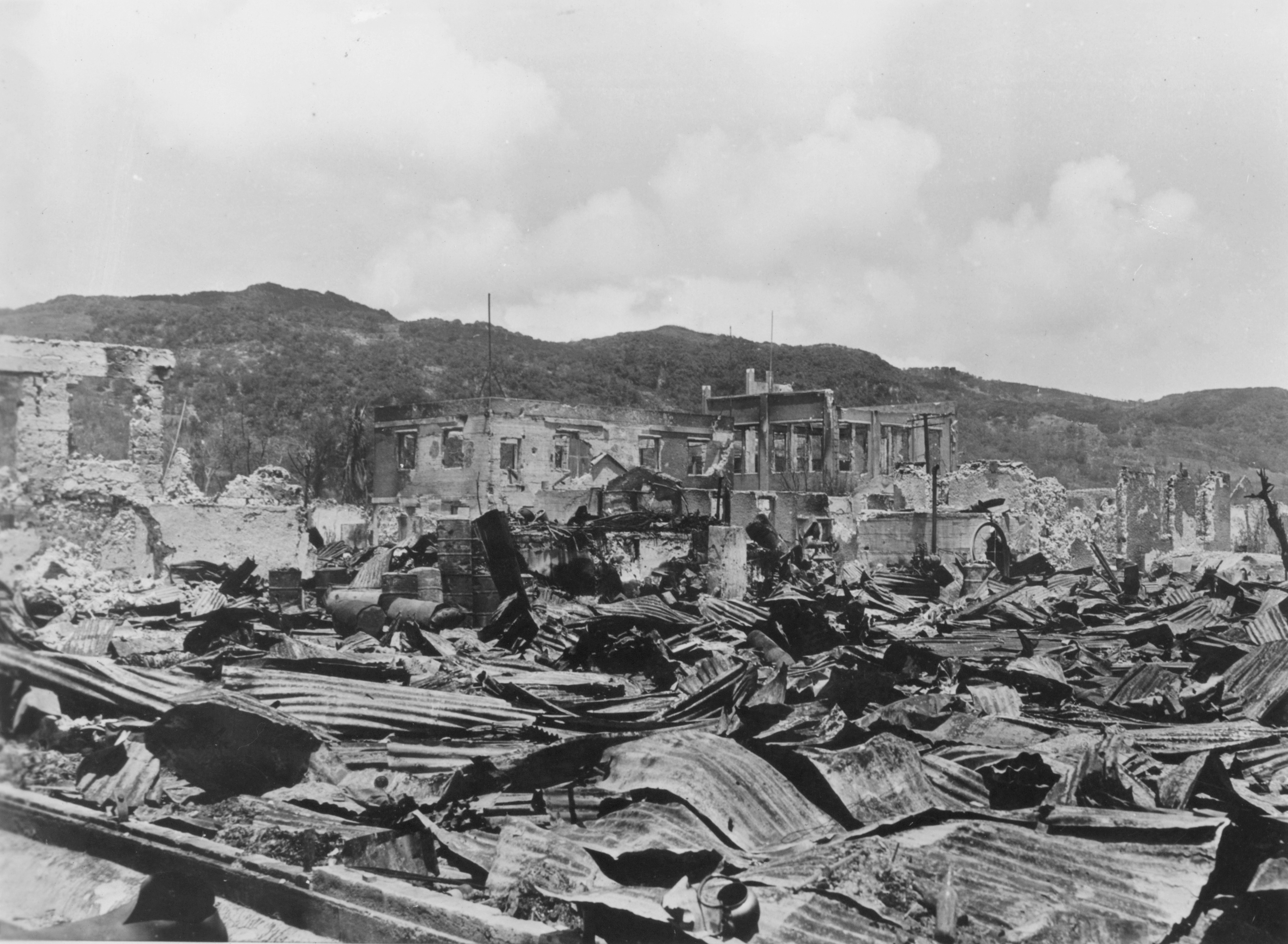
Garapan in ruins, c. July 1944

This prosperity came to an abrupt end in World War II. During the Battle of Saipan in 1944, Garapan was destroyed, and thousands of its civilian inhabitants were killed. The survivors were forcibly repatriated to the Japanese home islands after the surrender of Japan and the ruins of Garapan remained unpopulated until the late 1960s and 1970s, when the area was redeveloped into large resort hotels and condominiums for the tourist industry. Some of the few remaining structures from the Japanese period, such as the Nan'yo-cho Saipan Hospital, are preserved on the National Register of Historic Places.

== Education ==
Commonwealth of the Northern Mariana Islands Public School System

- Garapan Elementary School

Private schools:

- Grace Christian Academy

== See also ==
- Kristo Rai Church
- Garapan Heritage Trail
