= Tonowas =

Island in Chuuk Lagoon, Chuuk State, FSM

Coordinates: 07°22.36′N 151°52.30′E

Tonoas
- Municipality
- Flag

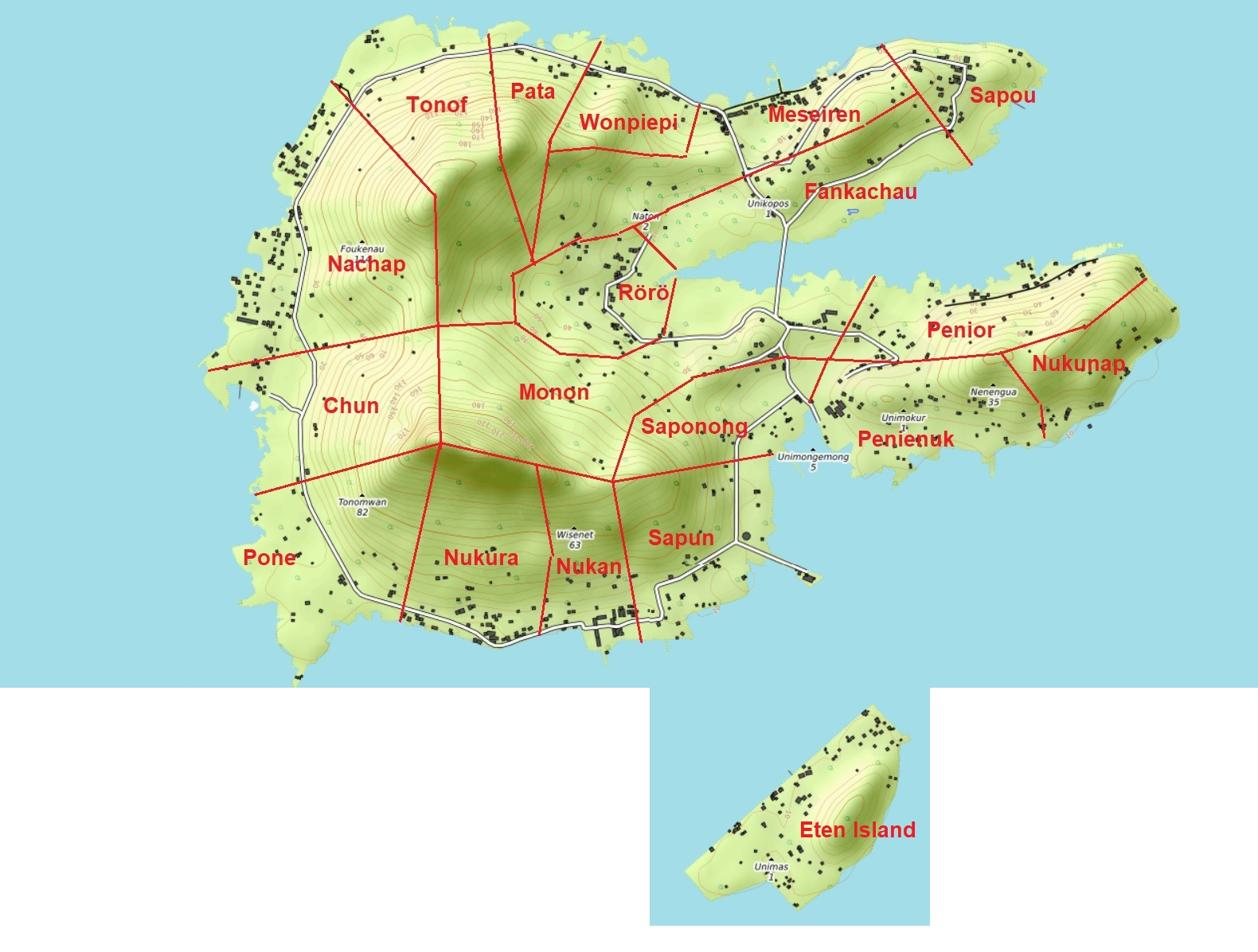
- Tonoas Islands, subdivided into traditional districts
- Country: Federated States of Micronesia
- State: Chuuk State

Tonoas (or Tonowas), also known by its Spanish name of Dublon, is an island in the Chuuk (formerly Truk) lagoon, Federated States of Micronesia. It has an area of 8.8 km^{2} ( 3.4 sq miles ) and the population was 3,514 at the time of the last census (2010-04-04), on an area of 9.17 km². These are the figurer for the whole municipality of Tonoas, which also includes Eten Island some 620 meters to the south. The municipal headquarters are located in Roro (Rörö) district and village.

A narrow single-lane track rings the island, allowing land access to the small villages (Nechap, Kuchua, Sangku, Enin, Yongku, and others). The villages, in most cases correspond to the historical districts of the island, which also includes Eten Island in its list:

1. Tonof (Tolop)
2. Pata (Pada, Paata)P
3. Wonpiepi (Woon Piyepi)
4. Meseiren (Meseran, Mesieien, Meseeraan)
5. Sapou (Sobou, Sopou, Sapwowu)
6. Fankachau (Fengatau, Felkedjau, Faan Kacaw)
7. Rörö (Rara, Rere, Reere)
8. Monon (Moalol, Moron, Mwonon)
9. Saponong (Sapotiu, Sopwonog)
10. Penior (Pelior, Pellor, Perior, Peniyoor)
11. Nukanap (Nuukanap)
12. Penienuk (Pelieluk, Perieluk, Peniyenak
13. Sapun (Sabou, Sabun, Sapwuun)
14. Eten Island (Etel, Etten)
15. Nukan (Nakan, Nukuan, Lugan, "Nukura", Nuukan)
16. Nukura (Lukulam Nukuna, "Nukan", Nukune)
17. Pone (Boenne, Boalle, Pwene)
  1. subdistrict Sonni (Soni)
18. Chun (Ccun)
19. Nachap (Nechap, Ledjap, Neecap)

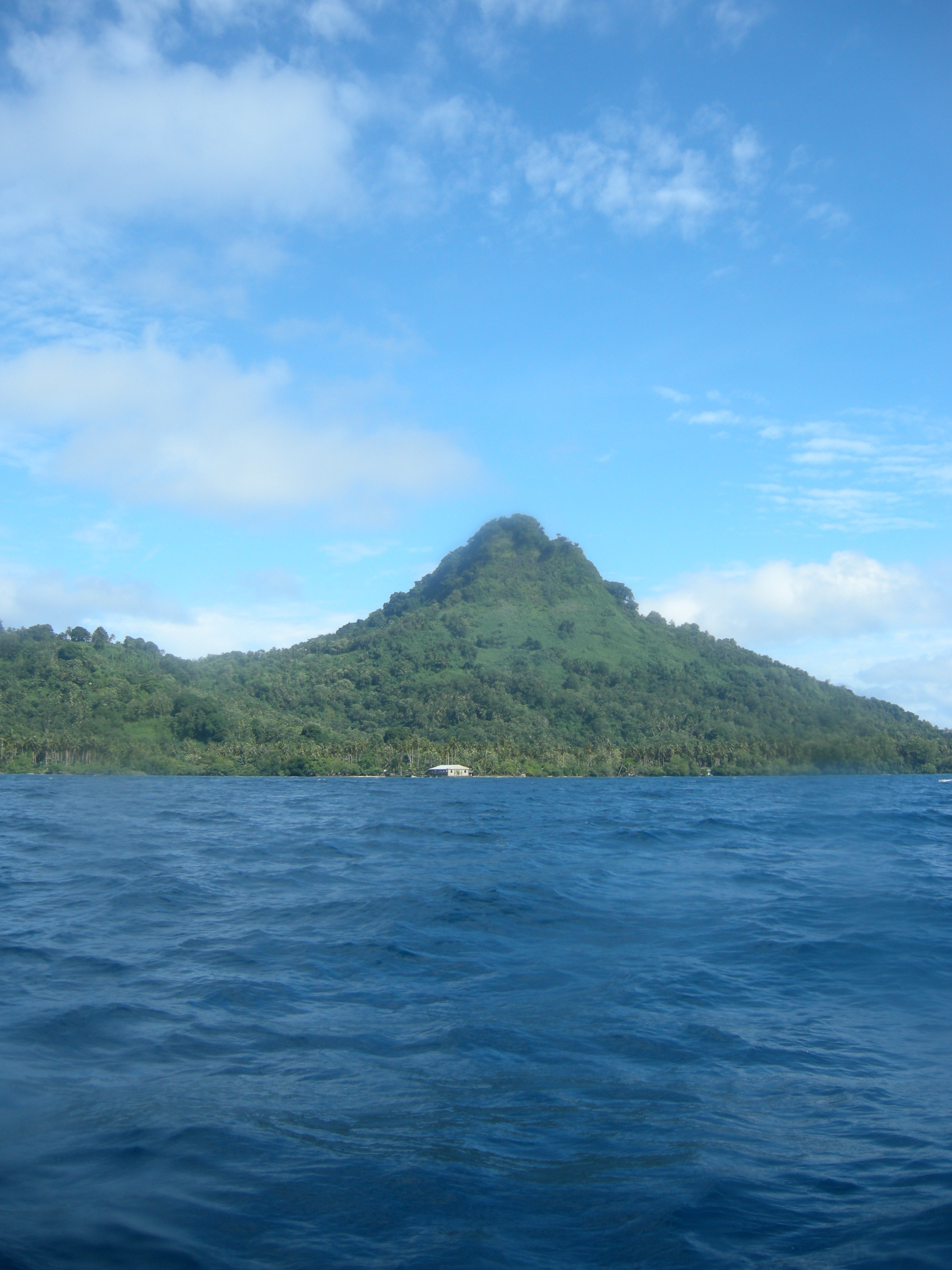
Tonoas Island, Chuuk

Dublon was a headquarters for the Imperial Japanese Army (IJA) during the Second World War. The Japanese name for the island was Natsu Shima (or Natsushima), which means "Summer Island." An underground bunker housing the IJA's headquarters facilities is listed on the United States National Register of Historic Places.
