= Haruji Matsue =

Japanese businessman

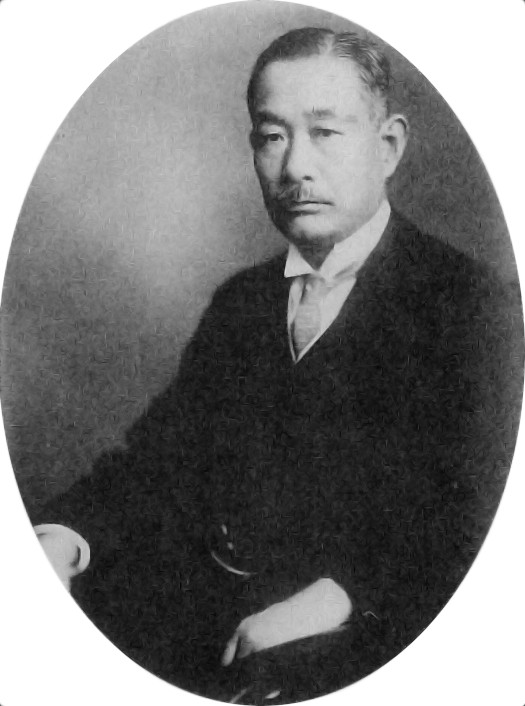
- Haruji Matsue
- Born: January 15, 1876
- Died: November 29, 1959 (aged 83)
- Occupation: entrepreneur
- Known for: Nan’yō Kōhatsu

Haruji Matsue (松江春次, Matsue Haruji; January 15, 1878 to November 29, 1954) was a Japanese entrepreneur and the first person to manufacture the sugar cube in Japan. His brother, Major General Toyohisa Matsue, was commandant of the Bandō prisoner-of-war camp in World War I.

== Biography ==
=== Early years ===
Matsue was born in Aizuwakamatsu, Fukushima as the second son of a former samurai of Aizu Domain. In 1899, he graduated from Tokyo Technical School and found employment with Dai-Nippon Sugar Company. However, in 1903 he passed an acceptance examination held by the Ministry of Agriculture and Commerce and received a scholarship to study overseas. He was sent to the Louisiana State University, well known at the time for its work in sugar cultivation, and graduated with a master's degree. He returned to Japan in 1907 and was appointed plant manager at Dai-Nippon Sugar's Osaka factory. However, Matsu left the company in 1908 after it became the center of a public scandal involving the bribery of several noted members of the Diet of Japan and moved to Taiwan. He worked for two sugar companies in Taiwan, but left due to disagreements with their senior management and after realizing that both companies were in precarious financial situations. Visiting Saipan and Tinian in the Mariana Islands, he realized their potential for development for sugar cane cultivation, and returned to Japan seeking investors.

=== Nan’yō Kōhatsu Kabushiki Kaisha ===
Meanwhile, the first governor of South Seas Mandate, Toshiro Tezuka, was turning to the Oriental Development Company for assistance in reviving the economy of Saipan and rescue the former employees of two failed companies, Nishimura Takushoku and Nan'yō Shokusan. With the capital from these companies and government approval, Matsue acquired the assets of Nan'yō Shokusan. In 1921 he founded Nan’yō Kōhatsu (South Seas Development Company). He trained Japanese laborers living on Saipan and others brought over from Okinawa and the Tōhoku region to clear the land, cultivate and harvest sugar cane, and build his refineries.

By 1925 Matsue had built an alcohol factory and ice plant on Saipan, planted over 3000 hectares of sugar, and extended his operations to Saipan's neighboring islands. By the end of the decade, he had brought more than 5,000 workers to the Marianas. The company quickly grew to become the largest private company in the Japanese Mandate, and at its height employed over 40,000 people. Matsue also built numerous recreational facilities for his workers on Saipan and other islands.

A fervent supporter of the Nanshin-ron doctrine, which advocated Japanese territorial expansion and colonization of the islands of Oceania and eventually the European-held territories of the Indonesian archipelago, Matsue led the company in developing a wide range of activities in Dutch, Portuguese and Australian territories in southeast Asia, especially in Sulawesi, Portuguese Timor and in New Guinea. The company bought out local Japanese copra plantations and fish processing plants, and established a shipping company. He also cultivated close relations with the Imperial Japanese Navy. Matsue resigned as president of Nan’yō Kōhatsu in 1940 and withdrew completely from the company in 1943. He donated money from his successful business to his home town of Aizuwakamatsu. A technical high school, Aizu Kōgyon kōkō (会津工業高校), was constructed using these funds. He died in November 1954 of a cerebral hemorrhage.
