= Nan'yō Kōhatsu =

Japanese strategic development company

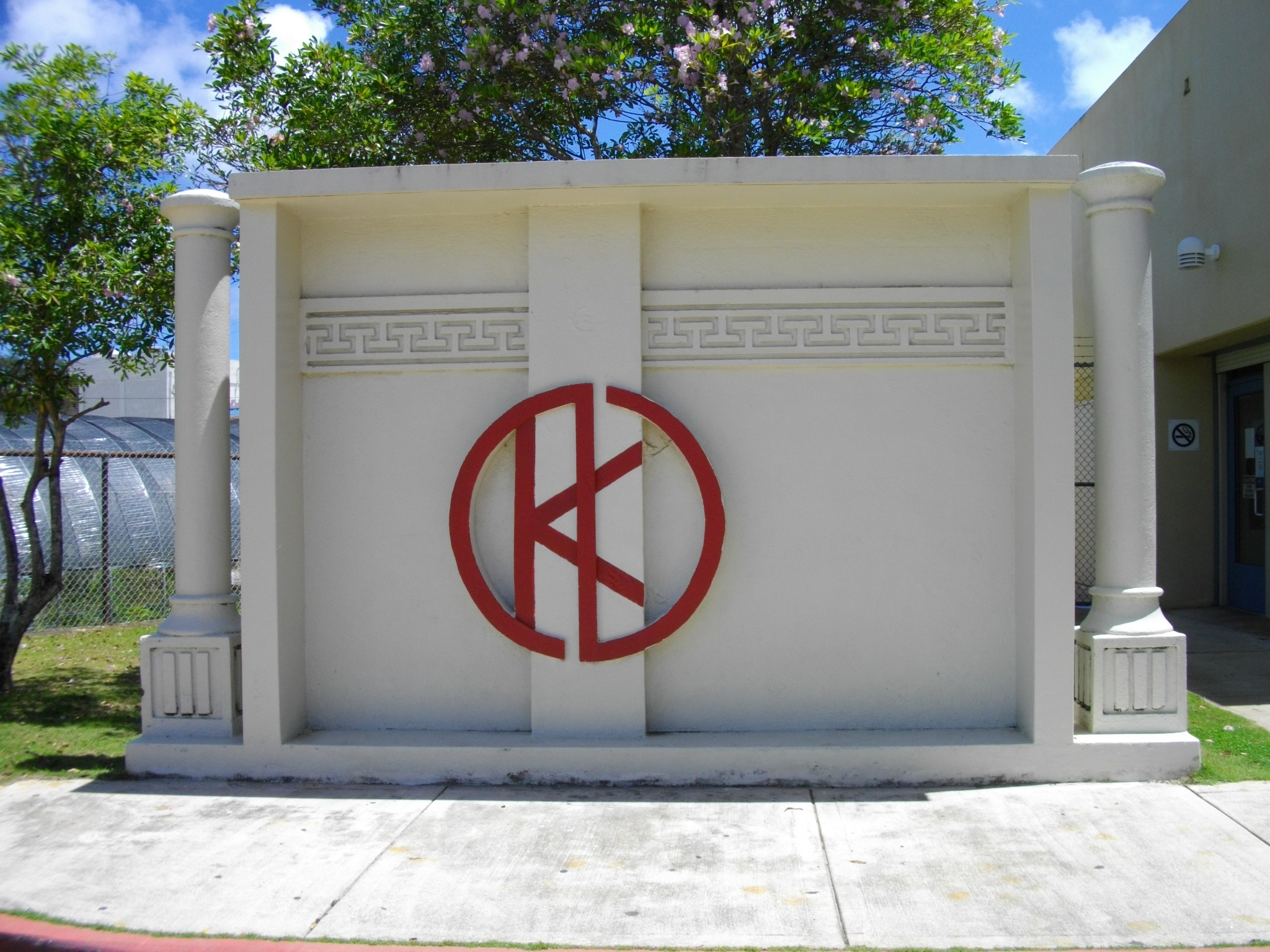
- Industry: Strategic development
- Founded: 1921; 104 years ago
- Founder: Haruji Matsue
- Fate: Disincorporated
- Headquarters: Japan
- Area served: Micronesia and Southeast Asia
- Key people: Tokuichi Kuribayashi

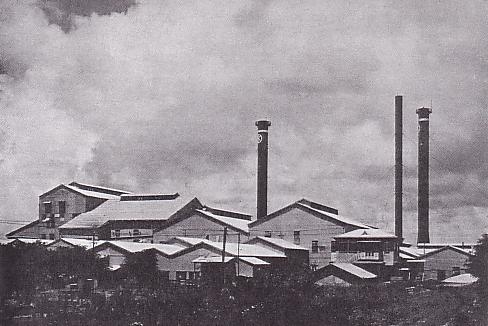
Factory of Nan'yō Kōhatsu in Chalan Kanoa, Saipan

The Nan'yō Kōhatsu kabushiki gaisha (南洋興発株式会社, abbreviated to Nankō or NKKK), also known the South Seas Development Company, was a Japanese strategic development company which aimed to promote economic development and Japanese political interests in Micronesia and Southeast Asia.

== 1921 founding ==
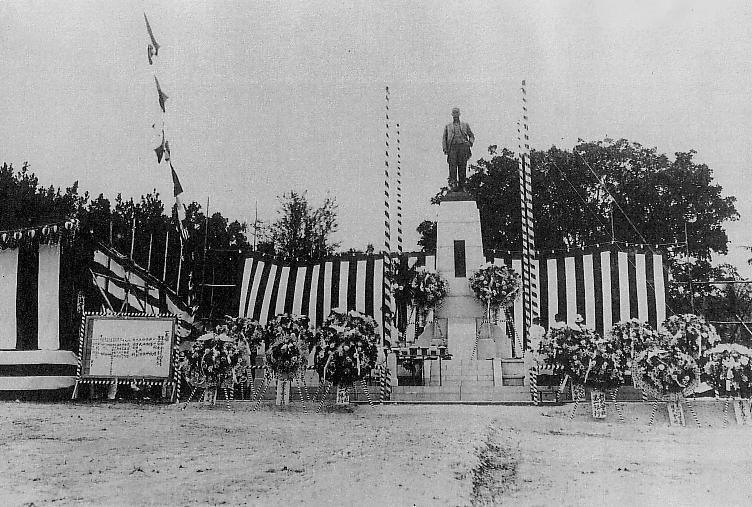
Unveiling ceremony of Haruji Matsue Statue

Founded in 1921 by Haruji Matsue to exploit the new mandated territory of Micronesia, Nanko received substantial support from the colonial administration and capital from the Oriental Development Company (東洋拓殖株式會社, Tōyō Takushoku K.K.). The company was promoted as the "Mantetsu of the South" in hopes that it would be as successful and as profitable as the South Manchuria Railway Company.

== Growth (1920s–1930s) ==
Matsue was a fervent supporter of the Nanshin-ron doctrine, which advocated Japanese territorial expansion and colonization of the islands of Oceania and eventually the European-held territories of the Indonesian archipelago. Building on the resources of the defunct Nan'yō Shokusan, Matsue was able to build a substantial empire supported by the sugar industry during the 1920s and 1930s. In addition to sponsoring the immigration of over 5,000 workers from Okinawa and northern Japan to the Mariana Islands, and clearing over 3,000 hectares for plantations, the company also built a sugar refinery, alcohol distillation plant, ice place and a railroad. Sugar cane became the primary industry of Saipan and by the mid-1930s the company exported over twelve million yen of sugar to mainland Japan.

In from the late 1920s and early 1930s, Nan'yō Kōhatsu developed a wide range of activities in British, Dutch and Australian territories in Southeast Asia, especially in Sulawesi and in New Guinea. The company bought out local Japanese copra plantations and fish processing plants, and established a shipping company. The company also established a cotton plantation in Manokwari on the northern coast of Dutch East Indies New Guinea, which also included an air field. By the late 1930s, the company employed over 50,000 people.

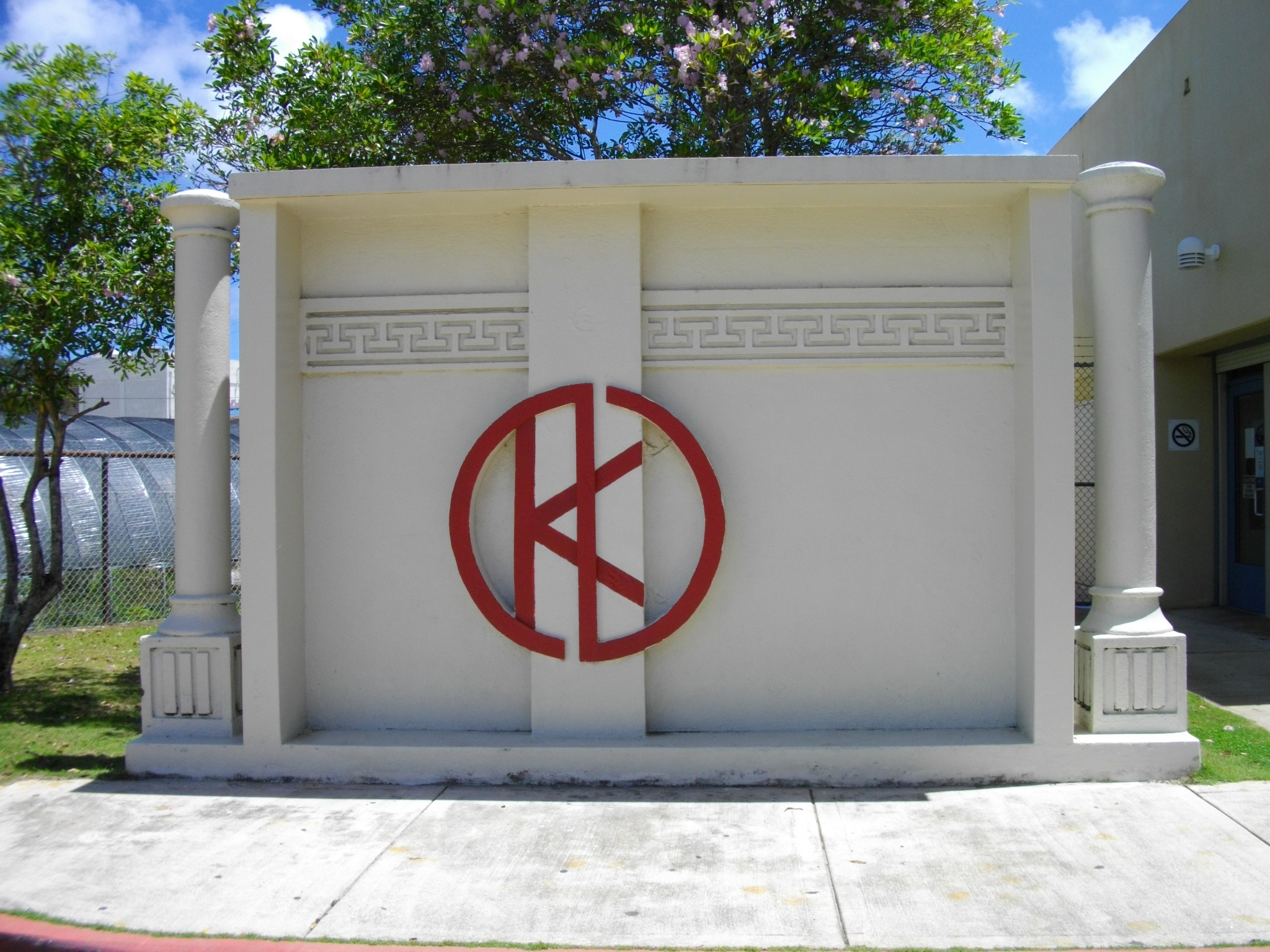
Logo on the wall

From its base in Palau, Nan'yō Kōhatsu sent small ships to Dili as early as 1934 in an effort to break the monopoly of Dutch shipping on trade with Portuguese Timor. However, in the summer of 1936, the company reached a secret agreement with the Imperial Japanese Navy to establish more of a foothold in Portuguese Timor, and with Navy funding, the company formed a joint venture in 1937 with the primary plantation company of Portuguese Timor, Sociedade Agrícola Pátria e Trabalho. The joint-venture effectively controlled imports and exports from Portuguese Timor, and by 1940 it was 48% controlled by Nan'yō Kōhatsu. The company also bought out many small private operations in the eastern part of the Indonesian archipelago, and formed numerous joint ventures with native entrepreneurs.

As international tensions increased in the late 1930s, and following the outbreak of war in Europe, the extension of Japanese interests represented by the Nan'yō Kōhatsu greatly concerned the British, Dutch and Australian authorities. Although Portugal and its colonies were neutral throughout the war, the Japanese interest in Timor led to the Allied invasion and occupation of Portuguese Timor in late 1941.

== Later years and abolition (1940–1945) ==
Matsue resigned as president in 1940, and was succeeded by Tokuichi Kuribayashi, an entrepreneur who had established several pearl fisheries in Southeast Asia and on the coast of Western Australia.

During the Japanese occupation of the Dutch East Indies, Nan'yō Kōhatsu continued to expand its operations, and received several projects from the Imperial Japanese Navy to assist in the administration of the occupied territories. In Sulawesi, for example, the company was responsible for the overseeing the collection and distribution of rice.

However, during the Pacific War, many of the company's facilities were destroyed by various battles, and some 10,000 company employees were killed. Kuribayashi negotiated with the Navy and with various insurance companies for compensation, which he partially received; however, Nan'yō Kōhatsu was abolished after the surrender of Japan by order of the Allied occupation authorities.

== See also ==
- South Seas Mandate
