= History according to the Catholic Church =

History according to the Catholic Church is the theological interpretation of the history of humanity and the history of Israel, as recorded in the Bible. The Catholic Church's view of history also covers contemporary history and predictions for the future.

This view of history is not the same as a timeline of the Catholic Church or an ecclesiastical history of the Catholic Church, but the method of historical interpretation using the Bible and the church, or in other words, a combination of Catholic origin myth and eschatology. In academic theology, the field of Church history develops and contributes to the Catholic Church's understanding of history. The church believes its foundation by Jesus marks the end-times, because Judaism believes that the messiah will come in the end-times. While the church accepts much of the Jewish interpretation of the Old Testament, such as the existence of God, divine inspiration, the Exodus to the Promised Land, Babylonian captivity, etc., the church does not agree with everything Judaism believes.

The Catholic Church interprets many scriptural events literally (whereas Judaism interprets them symbolically), applies the messianic prophecies to Jesus (whereas Judaism discounts certain scriptural verses as messianic prophecies and rejects Jesus' claims to messiahship and divinity), and applies Jewish self-identity to the church. For example, where Judaism believes that the world was created for the sake of Israel, the church teaches that the world was created for the sake of the New Israel (the church itself); and where Judaism is centered on God and his Torah, the church is Christocentric (since Christ is believed to be God and his Word).

== Official interpretation of biblical history ==
=== Past ===
==== Pre-Creation ====
Before creation, God predestined Jesus and his whole life, the Virgin Mary his mother, the church, each person to enjoy the beatific vision, the universal destination of goods, and all of creation to be renewed. God did not predestine man to die, and "predestines no one to go to hell."

==== Creation ====
The world was created in a "state of journeying" to its predestined renewal, and its creation is the first step toward God making a covenant with his people. After the sin and fall of the angels, Satan tempts Adam and Eve to sin and fall; but God promises mankind a redeemer. God only permitted the fall of the angels and men to display his power and love. That said, the church interprets the creation accounts in Genesis symbolically.

===== Salvation history =====
Salvation history is the history of revelation. God progressively revealed to his people creation, himself and the resurrection. By his promise to Abraham to make him the father of believers, God redirects human history from death to life. By accepting God's promise, Abraham inaugurates the salvation history that will culminate in Jesus. The passover, the exodus from Egypt, the giving of the Torah, and the covenant with his people begin to fulfill God's promise to Abraham. Salvation history includes a number of blessings - the "birth of Isaac, the escape from Egypt (Passover and Exodus), the gift of the promised land, the election of David, the presence of God in the Temple, the purifying exile, and return of a 'small remnant'" - that reveal how, from the beginning to the end of time, God's work is a blessing.

====== Times of the promises and preparations ======
The times of the promises and preparations is the time when God promised to send his people a redeemer and prepared his people for said redeemer. God spoke through the prophets, who summoned his people to repentance, and, unlike the other mitzvot that were written by Moses, God wrote the Decalogue.

====== Fullness of time ======
The fullness of time is the time of fulfillment of God's promises to and preparations of his people. The Virgin Mary is the culmination of God's preparation of his people for the messiah via her Immaculate Conception, Perpetual Virginity, and becoming the Theotokos. The Annunciation inaugurates the fullness of time. The conception of Jesus in Mary's womb inaugurates the end-times and the messianic age.

====== Hour of glory ======
The hour of glory is the hour of Jesus and the hour of the New Covenant: the Paschal Mystery. The Paschal Mystery is historical, yet transcends time by being made present in the Eucharist. The descent of the Holy Spirit at Pentecost fulfills the Paschal Mystery and inaugurates the age of the church.

=== Present ===
==== Age of the church ====
The age of the church is the age of the resurrection of Jesus and the age of the outpouring of the Holy Spirit. The church is the beginning of the kingdom of God that will come in its fullness at the second coming. The second coming is hastened every time the Eucharist is celebrated, and every time a Christian prays for Jesus to come and lives according to the mind of Jesus. The Assumption of Mary is an anticipation of the future resurrection.

=== Future ===
==== Signs that proceed the second coming ====
The second coming is suspended until Jesus is recognized by "all of Israel," and until the church undergoes a final test by the antichrist.

===== Sign of the antichrist =====
The antichrist will be the supreme pseudo-messianism that claims to solve everyone's problems at the cost of apostasy. It will cause the final persecution of the church. The antichrist is foreshadowed throughout history by secular messianisms and millenarianism.

==== Second coming of Jesus ====
The second coming of Jesus will happen on the last day. It will bring about the resurrection and judgment of mankind. The judgment of mankind will reveal each person's good and evil deeds and will reveal the ultimate meaning of history and creation, how God led everything to its goal, and how God's justice surpasses every injustice and God's love surpasses death.

== Unofficial interpretation ==
=== Past ===
==== Calculation of creation and Christmas ====
The Anno Mundi is sometimes used by Catholics to determine the date of Christmas.

==== Deicide ====
Jewish deicide is not accepted by the church. The church teaches that not Jews, but all sinners, are "the authors and the ministers" of Jesus' passion and death.

=== Present ===
==== Chastisement ====
Certain alleged private revelations, such as Our Lady of Akita and Our Lady of Medjugorje, claim mankind is undergoing a chastisement for its sins.

==== Six Ages of the World ====
Augustine of Hippo believed the world is divided into six ages, with the fifth age being the contemporary age and the sixth age beginning at the second coming.

=== Future ===
==== Signs that will proceed the second coming ====
According to the Catholic Encyclopedia, Judgment Day will be proceeded by the return of Elijah and Enoch, a number of natural disasters, and a supernatural fire that will renew creation.

==== Identity of the antichrist ====
Some Church Fathers, such as Irenaeus and Hippolytus, taught that the Antichrist will be a Jew from the tribe of Dan. Thomas Ice argues that the Antichrist will be a gentile.

== See also ==
- List of private revelations approved by the Catholic Church
- Criticism of the Catholic Church
- Historiography
- Philosophy of history
