= Timeline of the Catholic Church =

The history of the Catholic Church is integral to the history of Christianity as a whole. It is also, according to church historian Mark A. Noll, the "world's oldest continuously functioning international institution." This article covers a period of just under two thousand years.

Over time, schisms have disrupted the unity of Christianity. The Catholic Church considers that major divisions occurred in c. 144 with Marcionism, 318 with Arianism, 451 with the Oriental Orthodox, 1054 to 1449 (see East–West Schism) during which time the Orthodox Churches of the East parted ways with the Western Church over doctrinal issues (see the filioque) and papal primacy, and in 1517 with the Protestant Reformation, of which there were many divisions, resulting in over 200 denominations.

The Catholic Church has been the driving force behind some of the major events of world history including the Christianization of Western and Central Europe and Latin America, the spreading of literacy and the foundation of the universities, hospitals, the Western tradition of monasticism, the development of art and music, literature, architecture, contributions to the scientific method, just war theory and trial by jury. It has played a powerful role in global affairs, including the Reconquista, the Crusades, the Inquisition, the Investiture Controversy, the establishment of the Holy Roman Empire, and the Fall of Communism in Eastern Europe in the late 20th century.

== Ministry of Jesus and founding ==
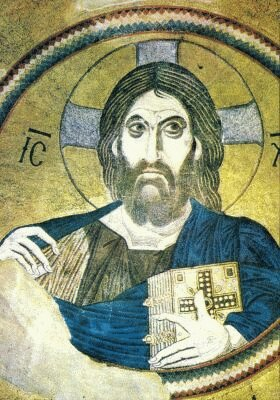
Byzantine image depicting Jesus as Christ pantocrator

- 4 BC: Nativity of Jesus. According to the Gospel of Luke, his birth occurred in the town of Bethlehem during the reigns of King Herod the Great of Judaea and the Roman Emperor Augustus, and he was the son of the Virgin Mary, who conceived him by the power of the Holy Spirit. He is the Divine Son of God incarnate or God the Son.

- The calculations of Dionysius Exiguus put the birth of Jesus in the year that in consequence is called 1 AD; most historians place his birth between 6 and 4 BC.

- 28–29 AD: Jesus' baptism, start of ministry, and selection of the Apostles. The Gospel of Luke indicates that Jesus was baptized during the 15th year of the reign of Tiberius Caesar which is dated in 28 AD (found in Luke 3:1,21,22). Christian Gospels strongly suggest Peter as leader and spokesman of the Apostles of Jesus, being mentioned the most number of times in the Gospels. Peter and the sons of Zebedee, James and John, constitute the inner circle of the Apostles of Jesus, being witnesses to specific important events of the life of Jesus: preachings of Jesus such as the Sermon on the Mount and performance of miracles mainly involving cures and driving out demons, inaugurating the Messianic Age.
- 30-33 AD: Peter declares and other followers believe Jesus of Nazareth to be the Jewish Messiah promised by Yahweh according to the Jewish Scriptures and the predictions of the Hebrew prophets. Entry into Jerusalem, start of Passion of Christ. Jesus of Nazareth is crucified in Jerusalem under Pontius Pilate, procurator of Judea during the reign of Tiberius and Herod Antipas, after the Sanhedrin, under the High Priest Caiaphas, accuse Jesus of blasphemy. He was then crucified under Pontius Pilate. According to his followers, three days later, He rose from the dead. Forty days after his resurrection (Ascension), the Christian Gospels narrate that Jesus instructed his disciples thus: "All authority has been given to me in heaven and on earth. Go therefore and make disciples of all the nations, baptizing them in the name of the Father and of the Son and of the Holy Spirit, teaching them to observe all things that I have commanded you; and lo, I am with you always, even to the end of time." (Matthew 28:18–20). Ten days later (Pentecost) Peter makes the first sermon, converting 3,000 to be baptized.

== First millennium ==
=== Apostolic Catholic Church ===
Dates in the Apostolic Age are mostly approximate, and all AD, mostly based on tradition or the New Testament.

- 34 AD: Stephen, the first Christian martyr, is stoned to death in Jerusalem according to the New Testament.
- 40: Traditional date of Our Lady of the Pillar showing up to James the Great in Santiago de Compostela, Spain.
- 46: Paul begin his missionary journeys, with Barnabas.
- 50: Council of Jerusalem determines that Gentile converts to Christianity do not have to abide by Mosaic Laws. This will gradually lead to the separation of Christianity from Judaism.
- 50–58: Paul's seven undisputed epistles written
- 52: Traditional arrival of Thomas the Apostle in Kerala, marking the founding of the Syro-Malabar Catholic Church.

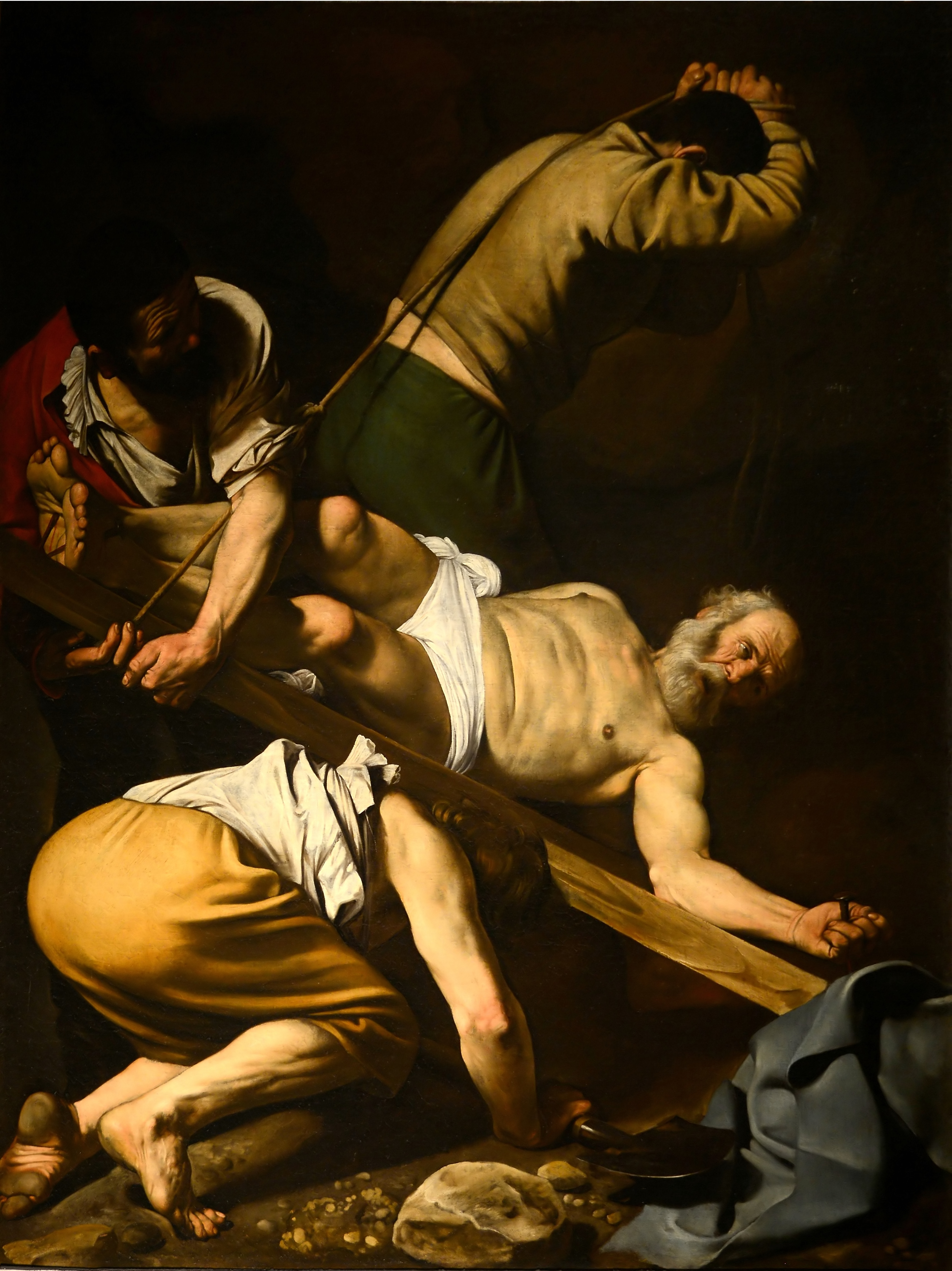
The Crucifixion of Saint Peter (1601) by Caravaggio

- 64: The Neronian Persecution begins under Nero after the Great Fire of Rome. Martyrdom of Peter. Persecution of Christians continues intermittently until 313 AD.
- 67: Martyrdom of Paul outside of Rome. Pope Linus, according to Catholic tradition, becomes the next pope.
- 68: Neronian Persecution ends with the suicide of Nero.
- 70: Fall of Jerusalem and the destruction of the Temple.
- 70: Earliest possible date for the completion of the Gospel of Mark
- 72: Martyrdom of Thomas the Apostle at Mylapore.
- 76: Martyrdom of Pope Linus.
- 80s Gospel of Matthew completed.
- 80s: Gospel of Luke and Acts of the Apostles completed
- 90–96 Persecution of Christians under Emperor Domitian
- 95 Book of Revelation written. (2nd).
- 96: Traditional date of First Epistle of Clement attributed to Pope Clement I written to the church in Corinth.
- 100: Gospel of John completed
- 100: John, the last of the apostles, dies in Ephesus.
- 110: Ignatius of Antioch uses the term Catholic Church in a letter to the church at Smyrna, in one of the letters of undisputed authenticity attributed to him. In this and other genuine letters he insists on the importance of the bishops in the church and speaks harshly about heretics and Judaizers.
- 150: Latin translations (the Vetus Latina) from the Greek texts of the Scriptures are circulated among non-Greek-speaking Christian communities.
- 154: The teachings of Marcion, the gnostic Valentinus and pentecostal Montanists cause disruptions in the Roman community. Persecution of Christians in the Roman Empire continues.
- 155: Justin Martyr composes his First Apology in Rome.
- 156: Polycarp, bishop of Smyrna, disciple of John, and teacher of Irenaeus, is martyred.
- 177: Irenaeus becomes bishop of Lyon, France.
- 180: Irenaeus's Adversus Haereses brings the concept of "heresy" to the fore in the first systematic attempt to counter Gnostic and other aberrant teachings. In the same work, he taught that the most reliable source of apostolic guidance was the episcopacy of Rome.
- 195: Pope Victor I, first African pope, excommunicated the Quartodecimans in an Easter controversy.
- 200: Tertullian, first great Christian Latin writer, coined for Christian concepts Latin terms such as "Trinitas", "Tres Personae", "Una Substantia", "Sacramentum"
- 248: Origen of Alexandria writes Contra Celsum, the most important apologetic writing of antiquity alongside Augustine's The City of God.
- 249: Pope Fabian is said to have sent out seven bishops from Rome to Gaul to preach the Gospel: Gatien to Tours, Trophimus to Arles, Paul to Narbonne, Saturnin to Toulouse, Denis to Paris, Austromoine to Clermont, and Martial to Limoges.
- 250: Emperor Decius begins a widespread persecution of Christians in Rome. Pope Fabian is martyred. Afterwards the Donatist controversy over readmitting lapsed Christians disaffects many in North Africa.
- 312: Emperor Constantine leads the forces of the Roman Empire to victory at the Battle of the Milvian Bridge. Tradition has it that, the night before the battle, Constantine had a vision that he would achieve victory if he fought under the symbol of Christ; accordingly, his soldiers bore on their shields the Chi-Rho sign composed of the first two letters of the Greek word for "Christ" (ΧΡΙΣΤΌΣ).

=== 313–476 ===
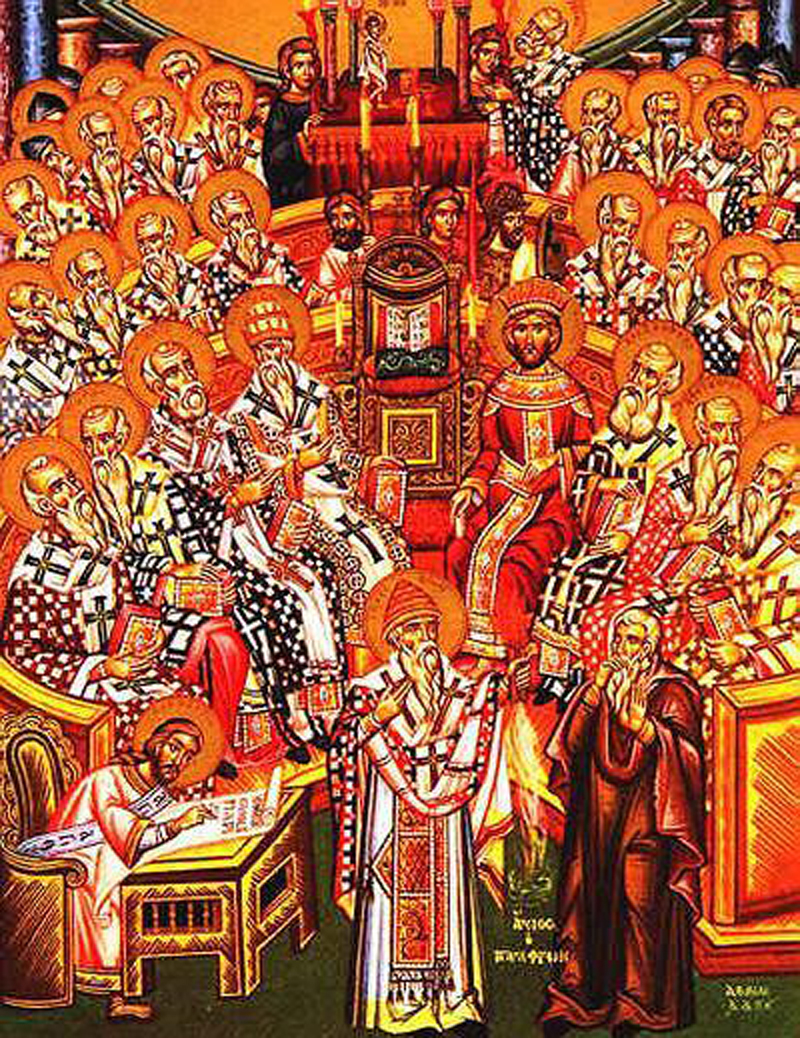
Eastern Orthodox icon depicting the First Council of Nicaea

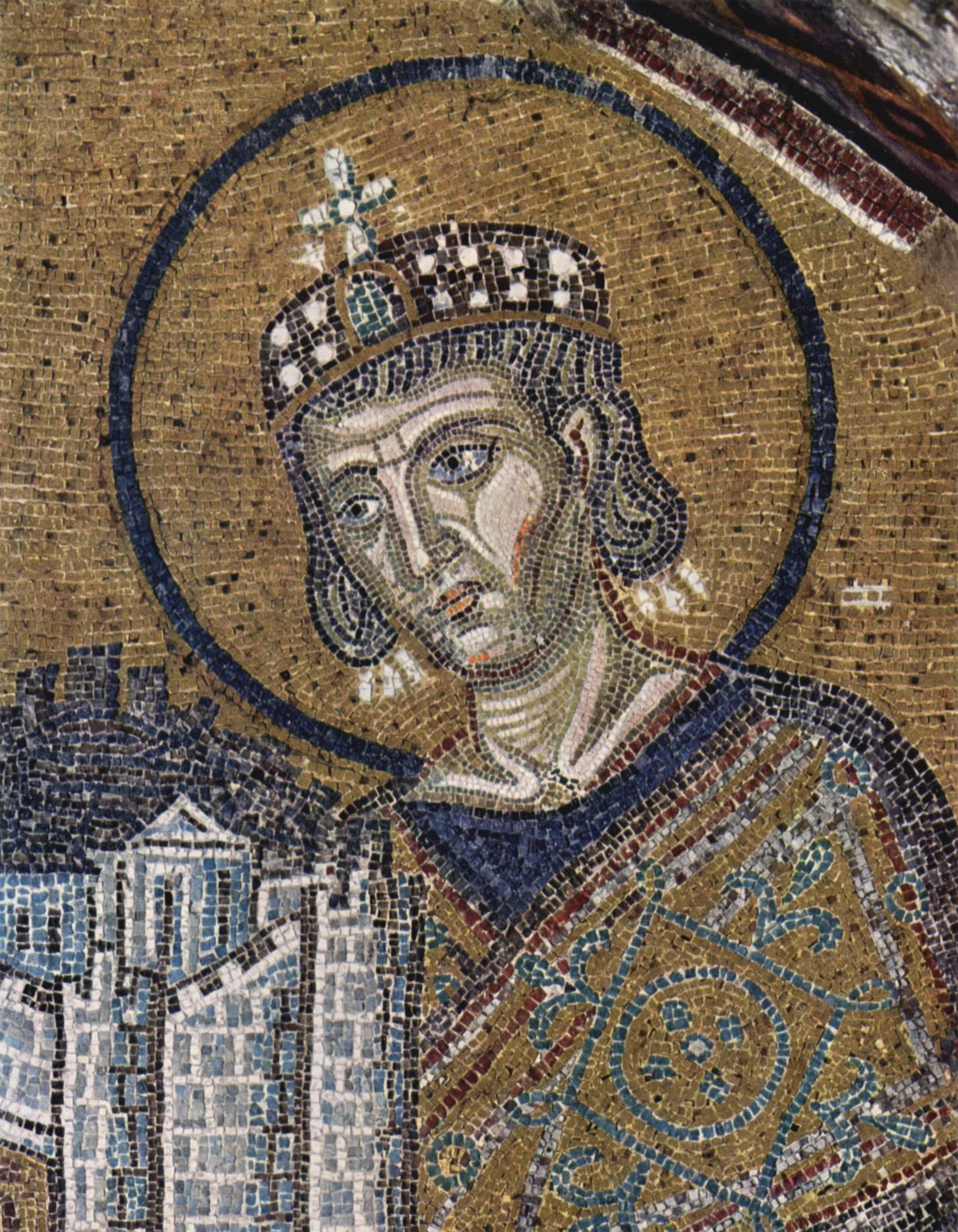
Constantine the Great summoned the bishops of the Christian Church to Nicaea to address divisions in the Church (mosaic in Hagia Sophia, Constantinople (Istanbul), ca. 1000).

- 313: The Edict of Milan declares the Roman Empire neutral towards religious views, in effect ending the persecution of Christians.
- 318: Arius condemned and excommunicated by a council convened by Alexander, bishop of Alexandria.
- 321: Granting the church the right to hold property, Constantine donates the palace of the Laterani to Pope Miltiades. The Lateran Basilica (Basilica of Our Savior) becomes the episcopal seat of the Bishop of Rome.
- November 3, 324: Constantine lays the foundations of the new capital of the Roman Empire in Byzantium, later to be known as Constantinople.
- 323 Pope Sylvester I in his calendar lists Sunday (rather than the Jewish Saturday) as the first day of the week, names it "the Lord's day", and commands church members to keep it as a holy day.
- 325: The Arian controversy erupts in Alexandria, causing widespread violence and disruptions among Christians.
- 325: The First Ecumenical Council of Nicaea, convened as a response to the Arian controversy, establishes the Nicene Creed, declaring the belief of orthodox Trinitarian Christians in the Trinity.
- November 18, 326: Pope Sylvester I consecrates the Basilica of St. Peter built by Constantine the Great over the tomb of the Apostle.
- 336: Date of the first recorded celebration of Christmas in Rome.
- 345: Pope Julius I officially sets the date of December 25 for the celebration of the Nativity or Christmas.
- 360: Julian the Apostate becomes the last non-Christian Roman Emperor.
- February, 380: Emperor Theodosius I issues an edict, De Fide Catolica, in Thessalonica, published in Constantinople, declaring Catholic Christianity as the state religion of the Roman Empire.
- 381: First Ecumenical Council of Constantinople.
- 382: The Council of Rome under Pope Damasus I sets the canon of the Bible, listing the accepted books of the Old Testament and the New Testament. No others are to be considered scripture.
- July, 387: Ambrose, bishop of Milan, baptizes Augustine of Hippo, along with his son, Adeodatus, in Milan.
- 391: The Theodosian decrees outlaw most pagan rituals still practiced in Rome, thereby encouraging much of the population to convert to Christianity.
- 400: Jerome's Vulgate Latin Bible translation is published, declared "authentic" by the Council of Trent. This remained the standard text in the Catholic world until the Renaissance, and was standard in Catholic services until the Second Vatican Council.
- August 24, 410: Sack of Rome. Alaric and his Visigoths burst in by the Porta Salaria on the northeast of the city of Rome.
- 431: The Ecumenical Council of Ephesus declares that Jesus existed both as Man and God simultaneously, clarifying his status in the Holy Trinity. The meaning of the Nicene Creed is also declared a permanent holy text of the church.
- October 8, 451: Ecumenical Council of Chalcedon opens.
- November 1, 451: The Council of Chalcedon, the fourth ecumenical council, closes. The Chalcedonian Creed is issued, which re-asserts Jesus as True God and True Man and the dogma of the Virgin Mary as the Mother of God. The council excommunicates Eutyches, leading to the schism with Oriental Orthodoxy.
- 452: Pope Leo I (the Great) meets Attila the Hun and dissuades him from sacking Rome.
- 455: Sack of Rome by the Vandals. The spoils of the Temple of Jerusalem previously taken by Titus are allegedly among the treasures taken to Carthage.
- September 4, 476: Emperor Romulus Augustus is deposed in Rome, marked by many as the fall of the Western Roman Empire. The focus of the early Church switches to expanding in the Eastern Roman Empire, also known as the Byzantine Empire, with its capital at Constantinople.

=== 477–799 ===
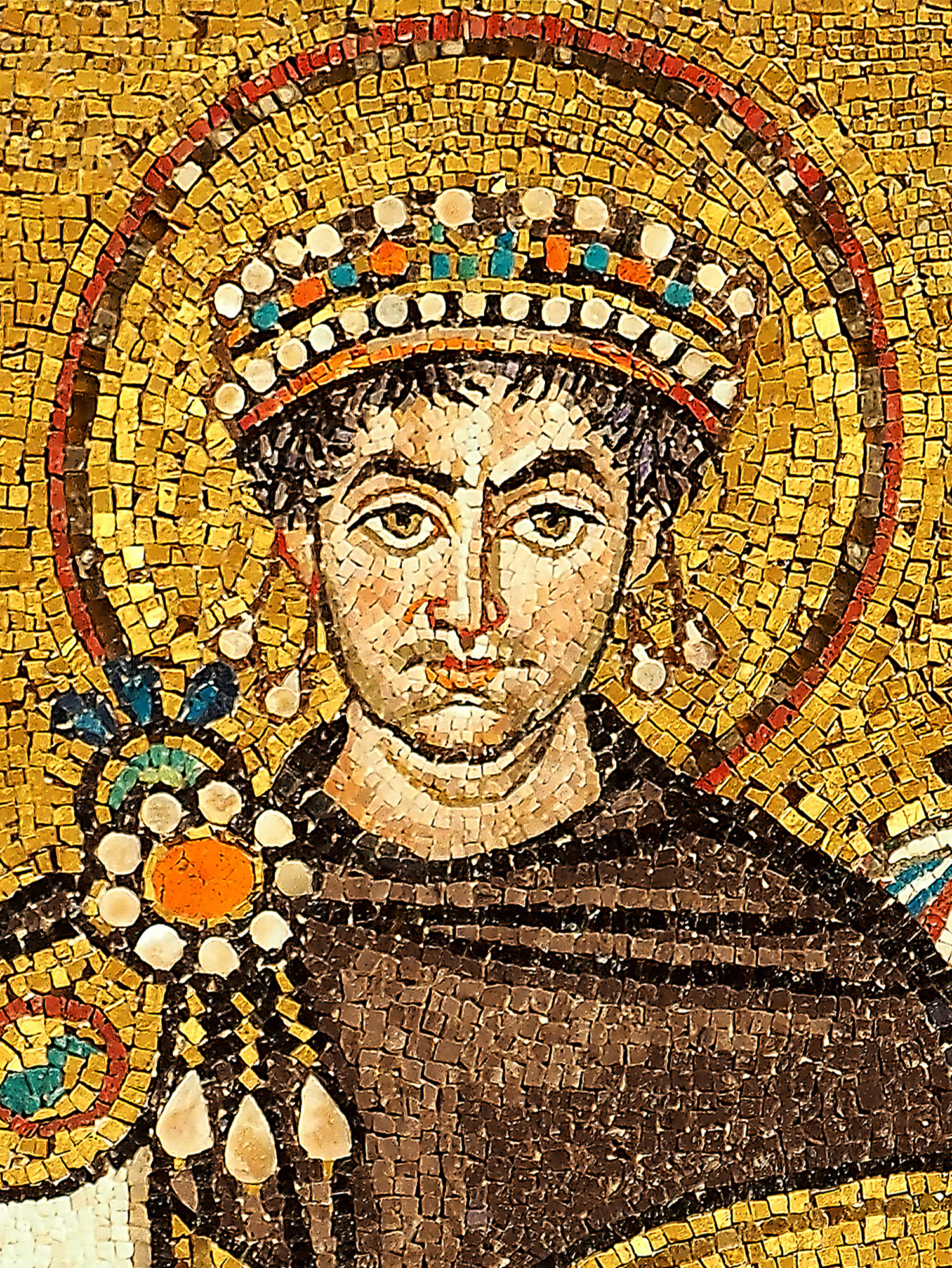
Justinian I depicted on a mosaic in the church of San Vitale, Ravenna, Italy

- 480: Traditional birth of Benedict, author of a monastic rule, setting out regulations for the establishment of monasteries.
- 496: Clovis I, pagan king of the Franks, converts to the Catholic faith.
- 502: Pope Symmachus ruled that laymen should no longer vote for the popes and that only higher clergy should be considered eligible.
- 529: The Codex Justinianus (Code of Justinian) completed. First part of Corpus Iuris Civilis (Body of Civil Law).
- January 2, 533: Mercurius becomes Pope John II. He becomes the first Successor of Peter to take a new name as pope. John II obtains valuable gifts as well as a profession of orthodox faith from the Byzantine emperor Justinian.
- 533: The Digest, or Pandects, was issued; second part of Corpus Iuris Civilis (Body of Civil Law). The Institutes, third part of Corpus Iuris Civilis (Body of Civil Law), comes into force of law.
- 536: Belisarius recaptures Rome.
- 553: Second Ecumenical Council of Constantinople condemned the errors of Origen of Alexandria, the Three Chapters, and confirmed the first four general councils.
- 590: Pope Gregory the Great. Reforms ecclesiastical structure and administration. Establishes Gregorian chant.
- 595: In a deed of manumission that freed two Roman slaves, Pope Gregory I declared that no heathen who wished to become a Christian should continue to be held a slave.
- 596: Augustine of Canterbury sent by Pope Gregory I to evangelize the pagan English.
- 638: Christian Jerusalem and Syria conquered by Muslims.
- 642: Egypt falls to the Muslims, followed by the rest of North Africa.
- 664: The Synod of Whitby unites the Celtic Church in England with the Catholic Church.
- 680: Third Council of Constantinople puts an end to Monothelitism.
- 685: The Maradites used their power and importance to choose John Maron, one of their own, as Patriarch of Antioch and all the East. John received the approval of Pope Sergius I, and became the first Maronite patriarch.
- 698: Willibrord commissioned by Pope Sergius I as bishop of the Frisians (Netherlands). Willibrord establishes a church in Utrecht.
- 711: Muslim armies invade Spain.
- 718: Boniface, an Englishman, commissioned by Pope Gregory II to evangelise the Germans.
- 726: Iconoclasm begins in the eastern Empire. The destruction of images persists until 843.
- 731: Venerable Bede, Benedictine monk and only English born Doctor of the Church (Anselm of Canterbury being Italian born), completes his Ecclesiastical History of the English People.
- 732: Muslim advance into Western Europe halted by Charles Martel at Poitiers, France.
- 751: Lombards abolish the Exarchate of Ravenna effectively ending last vestiges of Byzantine rule in central Italy and Rome.
- 756: Popes granted independent rule of Rome by King Pepin the Short of the Franks, in the Donation of Pepin. Birth of the Papal States.
- 787: Second Ecumenical Council of Nicaea resolved Iconoclasm.
- 793: Sacking of the monastery of Lindisfarne marks the beginning of Viking raids on Christian Europe.

=== 800–1001 ===
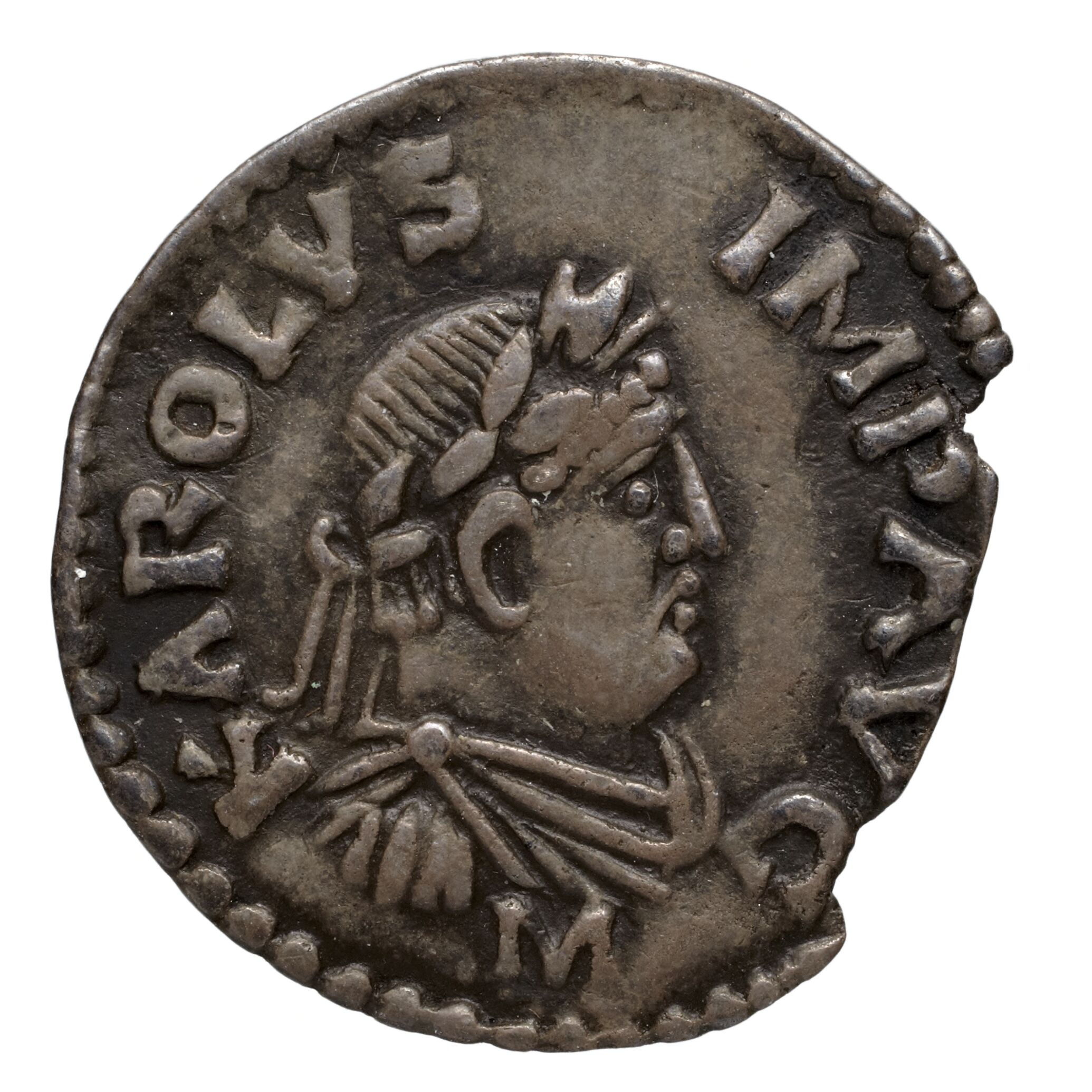
Blessed Charlemagne

- December 25, 800: King Charlemagne of the Franks is crowned Holy Roman Emperor of the West by Pope Leo III in St. Peter's Basilica.
- 829: Ansgar begins missionary work in Sweden near Stockholm.
- 859: Pope Leo IV confirms and anoints Alfred the Great king of Wessex, according to the Anglo-Saxon Chronicle.
- 863: Cyril and Methodius sent by the Patriarch of Constantinople to evangelise the Slavic peoples. They translate the Bible into Slavonic.
- 869: Fourth Ecumenical Council of Constantinople condemns Photius. This council and succeeding general councils are denied by the Eastern Orthodox Churches.
- 910: Great Benedictine monastery of Cluny rejuvenates western monasticism. Monasteries spread throughout the isolated regions of Western Europe.
- 962: King Otto the Great of Germany (East Francia) was crowned Holy Roman Emperor by Pope John XII in St. Peter's Basilica.
- 966: Mieszko I of Poland converts to Catholicism, beginning the Baptism of Poland.
- 988: Vladimir I the Great is baptized; becomes the first Christian Grand Duke of Kiev.
- 1000/1001 Stephen I of Hungary becomes King of Hungary, He would later convert to Roman Catholicism becoming the Founder of the Catholic Church in Hungary.

== Second millennium ==
=== 1001–1453 ===
- 1012: Burchard of Worms completes his twenty-volume Decretum of canon law.
- April 1033/1034: Anselm of Canterbury is born
- July 16, 1054: Liturgical, linguistic, and political divisions cause a permanent split between the Eastern and Western Churches, known as the East–West Schism or the Great Schism. The three legates, Humbert of Mourmoutiers, Frederick of Lorraine, and Peter, Archbishop of Amalfi, entered the Cathedral of the Hagia Sophia during Mass on a Saturday afternoon and placed a papal Bull of Excommunication on the altar against the Patriarch Michael I Cerularius. The legates left for Rome two days later, leaving behind a city near riots.
- November 27, 1095: Pope Urban II preaches to defend the eastern Christians, and pilgrims to the Holy Land, at the Council of Clermont.
- 1098: Foundation of the reforming monastery of Cîteaux, leads to the growth of the Cistercian order.
- 1099: Retaking of Jerusalem by the 1st Crusade, followed by a massacre of the remaining non-Christian inhabitants, and the establishment of the Crusader kingdoms; Latin bishops are appointed to dioceses still largely populated by the Orthodox.

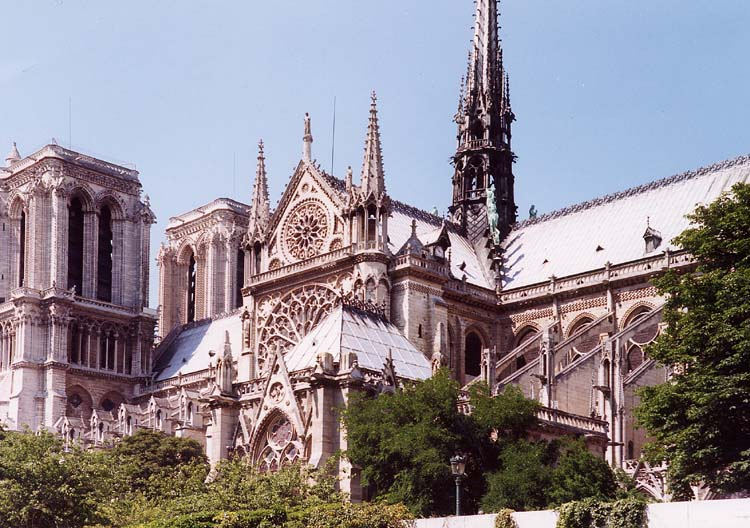
Notre-Dame Cathedral – designed in the Gothic architectural style.

- 1123: First Ecumenical Lateran Council. Among other internal issues it tackled, Canon 3 of the council (in response to widespread abuse among the clergy) forbade priests, deacons, and sub-deacons to associate with concubines or women in general other than with female family members.
- 1139: Second Ecumenical Lateran Council, promulgated a rule forbidding diocesan or secular priests to marry.
- 1144: The Saint Denis Basilica of Abbot Suger is the first major building in the style of Gothic architecture.
- 1150: Publication of Decretum Gratiani furnishing a guide to canon law for centuries, until 1918.
- 1179: Third Ecumenical Lateran Council.
- 1182: The Maronite Church reaffirms its unbroken communion with the Holy See.
- 1184: Pope Lucius III bans the Waldensians.
- October 2, 1187: The Siege of Jerusalem. Ayyubid forces led by Saladin capture Jerusalem, prompting the Third Crusade.
- 1188: Pope Innocent III issued a bull that proclaimed the emancipation of all slaves.
- January 8, 1198: Lotario de' Conti di Segni elected Pope Innocent III. His pontificate is often considered the height of the temporal power of the papacy.
- April 13, 1204: Sack of Constantinople by the Fourth Crusade. Beginning of Latin Empire of Constantinople.
- 1205: Francis of Assisi becomes a hermit, founding the Franciscan order of friars.
- November 11, 1215: Fourth Ecumenical Lateran Council opened by Pope Innocent III.
- November 30, 1215: Fourth Ecumenical Lateran Council is closed by Pope Innocent III. Seventy decrees were approved, the pre-Thomistic definition of transubstantiation being among them.
- 1215: Cardinal Stephen Langton, one of the early Catholic English cardinals, became an important player in the dispute between King John and Pope Innocent III. The tense situation led to the signing and promulgation of the Magna Charta.
- 1216: The Order of Preachers (Dominican Order) founded by Dominic is approved as a body of Canons Regular by Pope Honorius III on December 22 (Pope Innocent III having died in July).
- 1229: Inquisition founded in response to the Cathar heresy, at the Council of Toulouse.
- 1231: Charter of the University of Paris granted by Pope Gregory IX.
- 1233: In a papal bull or charter, Pope Gregory IX gave graduates of Cambridge University the right to teach "everywhere in Christendom". Other popes encouraged researchers and scholars from other universities to visit Cambridge, study there, and give lecture courses.
- 1241: The death of Ögedei Khan, the Great Khan of the Mongols, prevented the Mongols from further advancing into Europe after their easy victories over the combined Christian armies in the Battle of Liegnitz (in present-day Poland) and Battle of Mohi (in present-day Hungary).
- 1245: First Council of Lyon. Excommunicated and deposed Emperor Frederick II.
- 1248: Commencement year of the building of Cologne Cathedral; later finished in 1880.
- 1254: Pope Innocent IV grants to Oxford University a charter (via the papal bull, Querentes in argo).
- 1274: Second Council of Lyon; Catholic and Orthodox Churches temporarily reunited. Thomas Aquinas dies.
- 1295: Marco Polo arrives home in Venice.
- February 22, 1300: Pope Boniface VIII published the Bull Antiquorum fida relatio; first recorded Holy Year of the Jubilee celebrated.
- 1298: Gregory the Great, Ambrose, Augustine of Hippo, and Jerome are made Doctors of the Church.
- November 18, 1302: Pope Boniface VIII issues the papal bull Unam sanctam.
- 1305: French influence causes the Pope to move from Rome to Avignon.
- August 12, 1308: Pope Clement V issues the Bull Regnans in coelis calling a general council to meet on October 1, 1310, at Vienne in France for the purpose "of making provision in regard to the Order of Knights Templar, both the individual members and its lands, and in regard to other things in reference to the Catholic Faith, the Holy Land, and the improvement of the Church and of ecclesiastical persons".
- 1308: Meister Eckhart, Dominican mystic, composes his Book of Spiritual Consolations for Agnes, Queen of Hungary.
- August 17–20, 1308: The leaders of the Knights Templar are secretly absolved by Pope Clement V after their interrogation was carried out by papal agents to verify claims against the accused in the castle of Chinon in the diocese of Tours.
- October 16, 1311: The first formal session of the Ecumenical Council of Vienne begins under Pope Clement V.
- March 22, 1312: Clement V promulgates the Bull Vox in excelsis suppressing the Knights Templar.
- May 6, 1312: The Ecumenical Council of Vienne is closed on the third formal session.
- 1320: Dante Alighieri completes the Divine Comedy, one of the greatest works of world literature.
- May 26, 1328: William of Ockham flees Avignon. Later, he was excommunicated by Pope John XXII, whom Ockham accused of heresy.
- 1370: Catherine of Siena calls on the Pope to return to Rome.
- 1378: Antipope Clement VII (Avignon) elected against Pope Urban VI (Rome) precipitating the Western Schism.
- 1387: Lithuanians were the last in Europe to accept the Catholic faith.
- 1395: Julian of Norwich, mystic and contemplative, writes her Revelations of Divine Love.
- 1400: Geoffrey Chaucer finishes The Canterbury Tales, a compilation of stories told by pilgrims on a journey to the shrine of St. Thomas Becket of Canterbury.
- c. 1412–1431: Joan of Arc, a peasant girl from France, has visions from God telling her to lead her countrymen to reclaim their land from the English. After success in battle, she is captured by the English in 1431 and is condemned as a heretic and executed by burning, at the age of 19. Later investigation authorized by Pope Callixtus III would conclude she was innocent and a martyr.
- c. 1414–1418: The Council of Constance occurs, formally ending the Western Schism and condemning Jan Hus as a heretic.
- 1425: The Catholic University of Louvain is founded in Louvain, Belgium.
- 1440: Johannes Gutenberg completes his wooden printing press using movable metal type, revolutionizing the spread of knowledge by cheaper and faster means of reproduction. This soon leads to the large-scale production of religious books including Bibles, more accessible now to the laity.
- May 29, 1453: Fall of Constantinople.

=== 1454–1599 ===
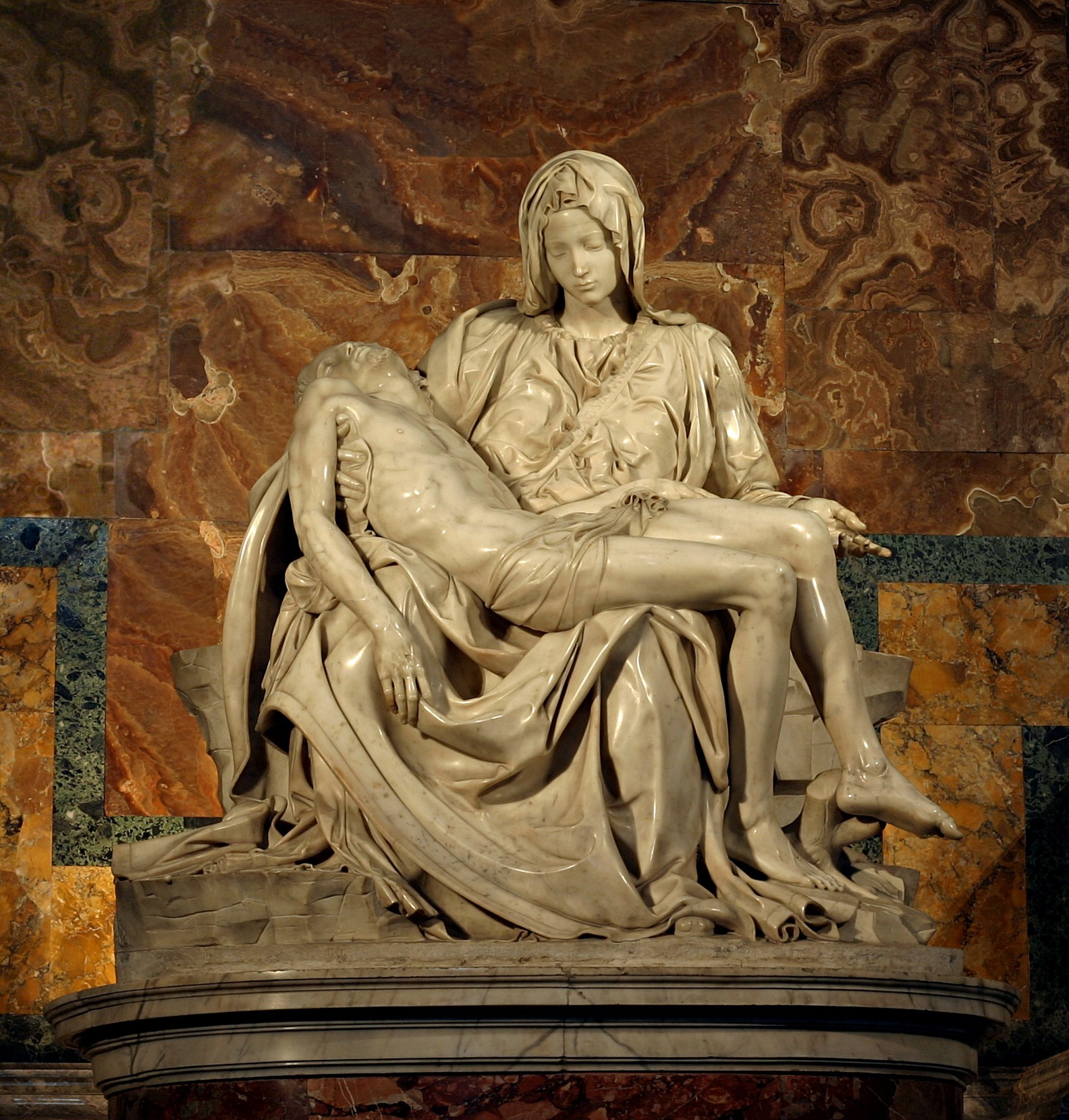
Michelangelo's Pietà in St. Peter's Basilica, Vatican City

- 1462: Pope Pius II issued a bill in which he declared the Catholic Church's opposition to the slave trade. The pope's primary concern was that prisoners captured during the European wars should not be enslaved by the victorious powers.
- 1492: Christopher Columbus reaches the Americas.
- 1493: With the Inter caetera, Pope Alexander VI awards sole colonial rights over most of the New World to Spain.
- 1495: Leonardo da Vinci started to paint The Last Supper.
- 1497: John Cabot lands in Newfoundland, Canada, to claim land for King Henry VII and to recognize the religious tradition of the Catholic Church.
- 1498: Vasco da Gama reaches Calicut, India.
- January 22, 1506: Kaspar von Silenen and first contingent of Swiss mercenaries enter the Vatican during the reign of Pope Julius II. Traditional date of founding of the Swiss Guards.
- April 18, 1506: Pope Julius II lays cornerstone of New Basilica of St. Peter.
- 1508: Michelangelo starts painting the Sistine Chapel ceiling.
- August 8, 1511: Pope Julius II creates the Diocese of Santo Domingo, the first diocese in the Americas, as well as the Diocese of Puerto Rico.
- 1516: Sir Thomas More publishes Utopia in Latin.
- October 31, 1517: Martin Luther posts his 95 Theses, protesting the sale of indulgences.
- 1520: Pope Leo X releases a papal bull, "Debitum Pastoralis", which conceded that neither the Bishop of Utrecht nor any of his successors, nor any of their clergy or laity, should ever have his cause taken to an external tribunal (Rome or anywhere else) for any reason. Any such proceeding would be null and void.
- January 3, 1521: Martin Luther excommunicated by Pope Leo X in the bull Decet Romanum Pontificem.
- March 16, 1521: Arrival of Ferdinand Magellan in the Philippines.
- March 31, 1521: Baptism of the first Catholics in the Philippines, the first Christian nation in Southeast Asia. This event is commemorated with the feast of the Santo Niño de Cebú.
- April 14, 1521: The Santo Niño de Cebú as gift by Hara Humamay (Juana) and Rajah Humabon to Ferdinand Magellan.
- October 17, 1521: Pope Leo X confers the title Fidei Defensor to Tudor King Henry VIII of England for his defense of the seven sacraments and the supremacy of the pope in Assertio Septem Sacramentorum against Protestantism.
- 1525: Arrival of the Spanish Catholic missionaries in the Philippines.
- May 6, 1527: Sack of Rome.
- 1527: Bartolomé de las Casas, Dominican friar, begins working on his History of the Indies.
- 1531: Our Lady of Guadalupe appears to Juan Diego in Mexico.
- April 27, 1533: Juan de Zumárraga is consecrated first bishop of Mexico.
- August 15, 1534: Ignatius of Loyola and six others, including Francis Xavier, meet in Montmartre near Paris and form a group that would become the non-monastic religious order the Society of Jesus.
- 1534: The Diocese of Goa is created by Portuguese missionaries to serve the Western Coast of India.
- October 30, 1534: English Parliament passes Act of Supremacy making the King of England Supreme Head of the Church of England, a national church canonically alienated from the bishop of Rome, the pope. The hegemony of one form of liturgy and order within the pre-Reformation English church is eventually broken or altered among ecclesial fractions, notably Dissenters, Anglicans (Church of England) and Catholics.

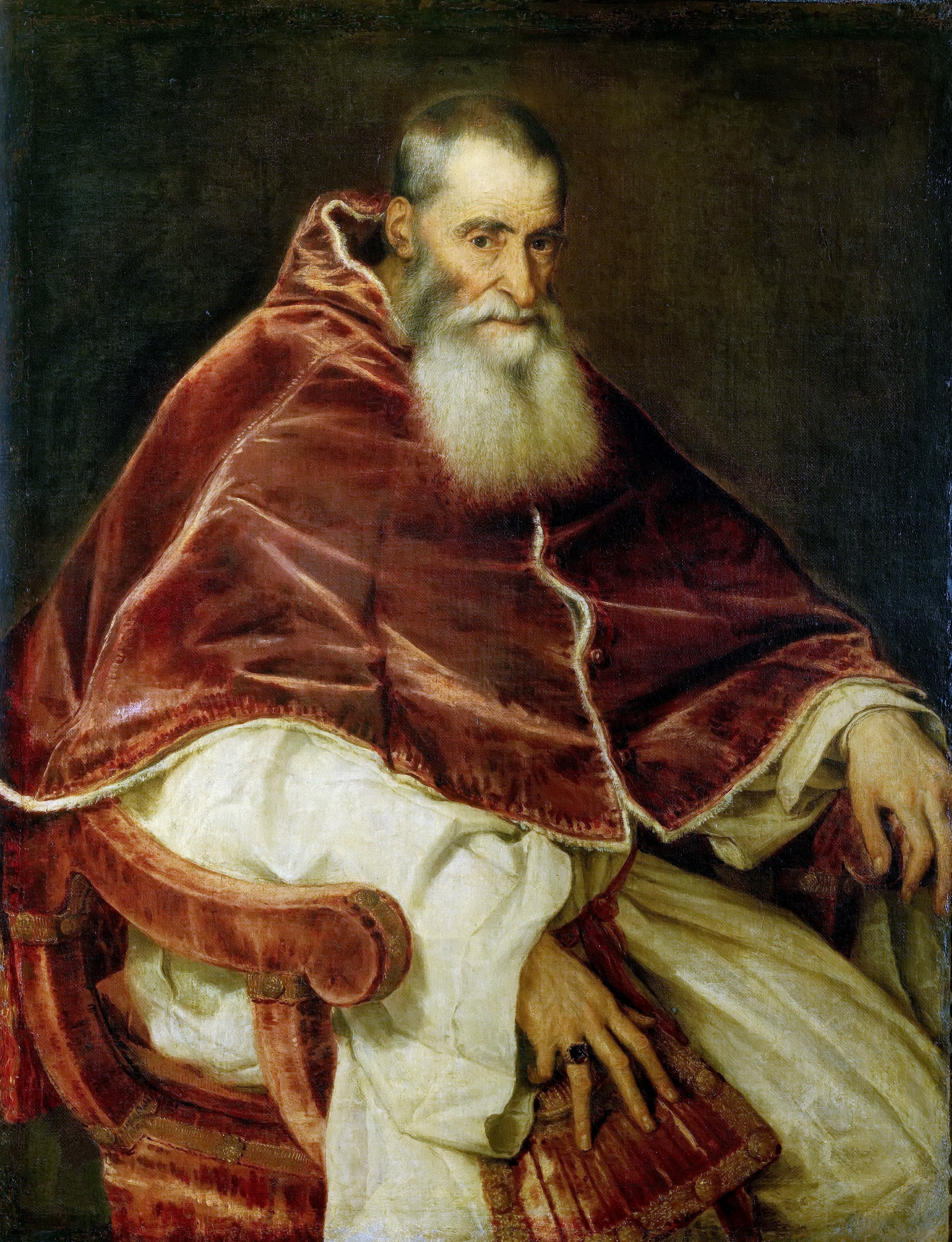
Pope Paul III

- 1535: Michelangelo starts painting the Last Judgement in the Sistine Chapel.
- 1536 to 1540: Dissolution of the monasteries in England, Wales and Ireland. Public strangulation and burning at the stake of William Tyndale, Protestant Reformist.
- 1537: Pope Paul III issues a bull in which he declared the Catholic Church's opposition to the slave trade. The pope's concern was similar to the concerns of his predecessor, Pius II, that prisoners captured during European wars should not be enslaved by victorious powers. He also issues the bull Veritas Ipsa, which decreed that indigenous people in the Americas were not to be enslaved.
- December 17, 1538: Pope Paul III definitively excommunicates King Henry VIII of England in papal bull Cum redemptor noster.
- 1540: Pope Paul III confirms the order of the Society of Jesus.
- 1541 The Archdiocese of Lima is founded as the diocese of Lima, Peru.
- July 21, 1542: Pope Paul III, with the constitution Licet ab initio, establishes the Supreme Sacred Congregation of the Roman and Universal Inquisition.
- 1543: Polish scientist-cleric Nicolaus Copernicus publishes a full account of the heliocentric Copernican theory, titled "On the Revolutions of the Heavenly Spheres" (De Revolutionibus Orbium Coelestium). Considered as the start of the scientific revolution.
- December 13, 1545: Ecumenical Council of Trent convened during the pontificate of Paul III, to prepare the Catholic response to the Protestant Reformation. Its rulings set the Counter-Reformation tone of Catholic Church for four centuries until the Second Vatican Council (1962–1965).
- July 27, 1549: Francis Xavier reaches Japan and goes ashore at Kagoshima, August 15.
- 1551: First diocese of Brazil is created with a Portuguese appointed bishop reaching Bahia, Brazil, a year later.
- 1562: Palestrina finishes Missa Papae Marcelli.
- December 4, 1563: Ecumenical Council of Trent closed. The decrees were confirmed on January 26, 1564, by Pius IV in the Bull Benedictus Deus.
- April 27, 1565: Arrival of Miguel López de Legazpi and Augustinian friars in the Philippines.
- April 28, 1565: Finding of the image of Santo Niño de Cebú in Cebu, Philippines.
- April 28, 1565: The Basilica Minore del Santo Niño is the first Roman Catholic church in the Philippines.
- 1568: John Chrysostom, Basil of Caesarea, Gregory Nazianzus, Athanasius of Alexandria and Thomas Aquinas are made Doctors of the Church.
- July 14, 1570: Pope Pius V issues the apostolic constitution on the Tridentine Mass, Quo Primum.
- January 24, 1571: Miguel López de Legazpi conquers Manila, Philippines, with the zeal of Spanish Catholic missionaries.
- May 19, 1571: Consecration of Nuestra Señora de Guia (Our Lady of Guidance) as "Sworn Patroness of Manila" in Manila, Philippines.
- June 24, 1571: Founding of San Agustin Church in Intramuros, Manila, Philippines.
- October 7, 1571: Christian fleet of the Holy League defeats the Ottoman Turks in the Battle of Lepanto.
- 1571: French government of King Charles IX decrees that "all prisoners are free in this kingdom, as soon as a slave has reached these frontiers and becomes baptized, he is free."
- 1571: Founding of the Manila Cathedral in Intramuros, Manila, Philippines, as "Church of Manila".
- 1577: Teresa of Ávila writes The Interior Castle, one of the classic works of Catholic mysticism.
- December 21, 1581: Construction of Manila Cathedral in Intramuros, Manila, Philippines.
- February 24, 1582: Pope Gregory XIII issues the bull Inter gravissimas reforming the Julian calendar.
- October 15, 1582: The Gregorian calendar is first adopted by Italy, Spain, Poland and Portugal. October 4 (Julian) is followed by October 15 (Gregorian) – ten days are removed.
- 1582: John of the Cross begins his Dark Night of the Soul, a classic works of Catholic mysticism.
- 1582: Matteo Ricci arrives at Macau to begin his missionary work in China.
- September 28, 1586: Domenico Fontana successfully finished re-erecting the Vatican Obelisk at its present site in St. Peter's Square. Hailed as a great technical achievement of its time.
- 1589–91: William Byrd composes his Cantiones sacrae. His music, according to the Encyclopedia Britannica, has "an intensity unrivaled in England and a breadth of scale unknown on the Continent." Byrd and his teacher, Thomas Tallis, though both Catholic, were allowed to compose and perform music during the reign of Elizabeth I.
- 1593: Robert Bellarmine finishes his Disputationes de controversiis christianae fidei.
- 1593: Printing of Doctrina Christiana in Manila, Philippines.
- 1593–1596: Spanish Governor-General Luis Pérez Dasmariñas commissions the image of Our Lady of the Holy Rosary of La Naval de Manila in Manila, Philippines.
- August 14, 1595: Canonical erection of the Roman Catholic Archdiocese of Manila, Diocese of Nueva Segovia, Diocese of Nueva Cáceres and Diocese of Cebu in the Philippines.
- August 21, 1595: Roman Catholic Archdiocese of Manila established in Manila, Philippines.
- 1596: Signing of the Union of Brest between the See of Rome and the Ruthenian Orthodox Church.
- 1598: Papal role in Peace of Vervins.

=== 1600–1699 ===
- 1600: Pope Clement VIII sanctions use of coffee despite petition by priests to ban the Muslim drink as "the devil's drink". The Pope tried a cup and declared it "so delicious that it would be a pity to let the infidels have exclusive use of it. We shall cheat Satan by baptizing it."
- August 25, 1601: Establishment of San Jose Seminary, known as El Colegio de San Jose de Manila, in Intramuros, Manila, Philippines.
- 1606: Arrival of the Black Nazarene in Manila, Philippines, from Acapulco, Mexico; its home is the Minor Basilica and National Shrine of the Black Nazarene/Parish of Saint John the Baptist in Quiapo district.
- 1609: Francis de Sales publishes his Introduction to the Devout Life. Later, in 1616, he publishes the Treatise on the Love of God.
- 1610: Claudio Monteverdi's Vespro della Beata Vergine is performed.
- 1610: Apparition of Our Lady of Manaoag in Manaoag, Pangasinan, Philippines.
- 1611–1619, 1639: Apparition of Our Lady of Caysasay in Taal, Batangas, Philippines.
- April 28, 1611: University of Santo Tomas established in Sampaloc, Manila, Philippines, and also known as Pontifical and Royal University.
- 1614: Tokugawa Ieyasu bans Christianity from Japan.
- 1618: Arrival of the image of Our Lady of Mount Carmel in Manila, Philippines; its home is San Sebastian Church in Quiapo district.
- 1620: Colegio de San Juan de Letran established in Intramuros, Manila, Philippines.
- 1621: Establishment of Cofradia de Jesus Nazareno in Quiapo, Manila, Philippines.
- April 19, 1622: Pope Gregory XV makes Armand Jean du Plessis de Richelieu a cardinal upon the nomination of King Louis XIII of France – becoming Cardinal Richelieu. His influence and policies greatly impact the course of European politics.
- March 25, 1626: Arrival of Our Lady of Peace and Good Voyage from Manila going to Antipolo, Rizal, Philippines; its home is Antipolo Cathedral.
- November 18, 1626: Pope Urban VIII solemnly dedicates the New Basilica of St. Peter 1,300 years after the first Constantinian basilica was consecrated by Pope Sylvester I.
- October 24, 1632: Establishment of Colegio de Santa Isabel in Intramuros, Manila, Philippines; its home is Santa Isabel College Manila in Ermita district.
- 1633: Trial of Galileo, after which he is sentenced to house arrest.

Louis XIV of France

- 1637: Lorenzo Ruiz is a Filipino martyr of the Philippines and his companions martyred in Nishizuka Hill, Nagasaki, Japan.
- 1638: Shimabara Rebellion leads to a further repression of Catholics, and all Christians, in Japan.
- March 15, to October 4, 1646: Battles of La Naval de Manila off Manila Bay, Philippines, was fought between the Spanish and Dutch naval warships.
- 1653: Coonan Cross Oath is taken by a group of Saint Thomas Christians against the Portuguese.
- 1667: Apparition of Our Lady of Porta Vaga in Cavite City, Cavite, Philippines.
- 1671: Rose of Lima, Peruvian lay member of the Order of Preachers (Dominican order) and mystic, is canonized by Pope Clement IX.
- 1672: Pedro Calungsod of the Philippines and Diego Luis de San Vitores is the Spanish Jesuit missionary martyred in Tumon, Guam.
- 1674: Quebec City, Canada, is elevated to a diocese with its own bishop, Francois de Montmorency-Laval. At one time (1712), the Quebec diocese covered most of the American continent (French, English and Native American territories/colonies) to the Gulf of Mexico. No other Christian community, Catholic or otherwise, had a bishop in those territories at the time.
- September 12, 1683: Battle of Vienna. Decisive victory of the army of the Holy League, under King John III Sobieski of Poland, over the Ottoman Turks, under Grand Vizier Merzifonlu Kara Mustafa Pasha. The Turks do not threaten Western Europe militarily again.
- 1685: Louis XIV revokes the Edict of Nantes, and large numbers of Huguenot refugees leave France.
- 1687: John Dryden, dominant English literary figure and influence of his age, publishes The Hind and the Panther to celebrate his conversion to Catholicism.
- 1691: Pope Innocent XII declares against nepotism and simony.

=== 1700–1799 ===
- April 28, 1702: Establishment of the Royal and Conciliar San Carlos Seminary (now San Carlos Seminary) in Manila, Philippines; its home is in Makati City.
- 1710: Carving of the original image of Our Lady of Peñafrancia in Naga City, Camarines Sur, Philippines.
- 1713: Encyclical Unigenitus condemns Jansenism.
- 1715: Pope Clement XI rules against the Jesuits in the Chinese Rites controversy. Reversed by Pius XII in 1939.
- 1720: Anselm of Canterbury made Doctor of the Church.
- 1721: Kangxi Emperor bans Christian missions in China.
- 1729: Pope Benedict XIII recognized Cyril VI as the legitimate Patriarch of Antioch and recognized his followers as being in full communion with the Catholic Church.
- 1736: The Synod of Mount Lebanon takes place in which the Maronite Church reforms itself and aligns closer with the Latin Church.
- 1737: Vincent de Paul, French priest who dedicated his life and ministry to serving the poor, is canonized by Pope Clement XII.
- April 28, 1738: Pope Clement XII publishes the bull In Eminenti forbidding Catholics from joining, aiding, socializing or otherwise directly or indirectly helping the organizations of Freemasonry and Freemasons under pain of excommunication. Membership to any secret society would also incur the penalty of excommunication.
- 1738: Grey Nuns founded.
- 1740: Publication of Richard Challoner's Garden of the Soul.
- 1740–1758: Pope Benedict XIV appointed first women as professors to Papal Universities in Bologna, reformed canonization procedures: an intellectual open to all sciences;
- 1769: Passionist religious institute granted full rights by Pope Clement XIV.

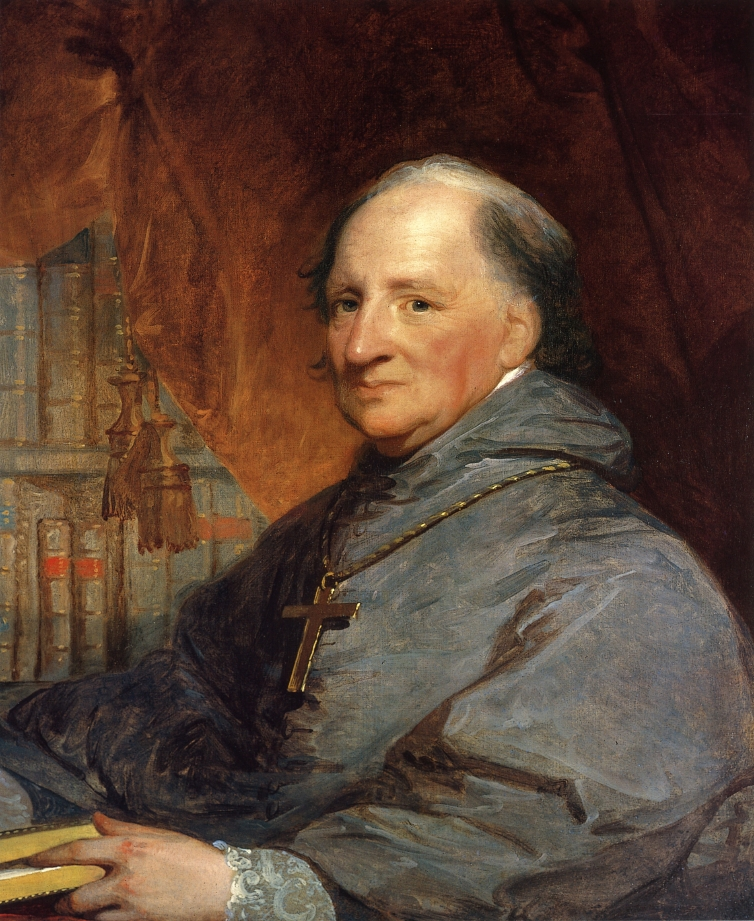
John Carroll

- 1769: Junípero Serra establishes Mission San Diego de Alcalá, the first of the Spanish missions in Alta California. The Jesuits had founded missions in Baja California from 1684.
- 1773: Suppression of the Jesuits by Pope Clement XIV, already excluded from many states. Only in the Russian Empire are they able to remain.
- 1784: Baptism of the first Korean Catholic.
- 1789: John Carroll becomes the Bishop of Baltimore, the first bishop in the United States.
- 1789: Georgetown University is founded as Georgetown College. It is the oldest Catholic university in the United States and the first of 28 colleges and universities founded by the Jesuits in the US.
- 1791: Wolfgang Amadeus Mozart composes Ave verum corpus and his unfinished Requiem.
- 1793: French Revolution institutes anti-clerical measures.
- 1798: Joseph Haydn, Austrian composer and teacher of Beethoven, composed The Creation (Haydn), an oratorio that celebrates and portrays the creation as recounted in the Book of Genesis.
- 1798: Pope Pius VI taken prisoner by the armies of Napoleon Bonaparte, dies in captivity in France.

=== 19th century ===
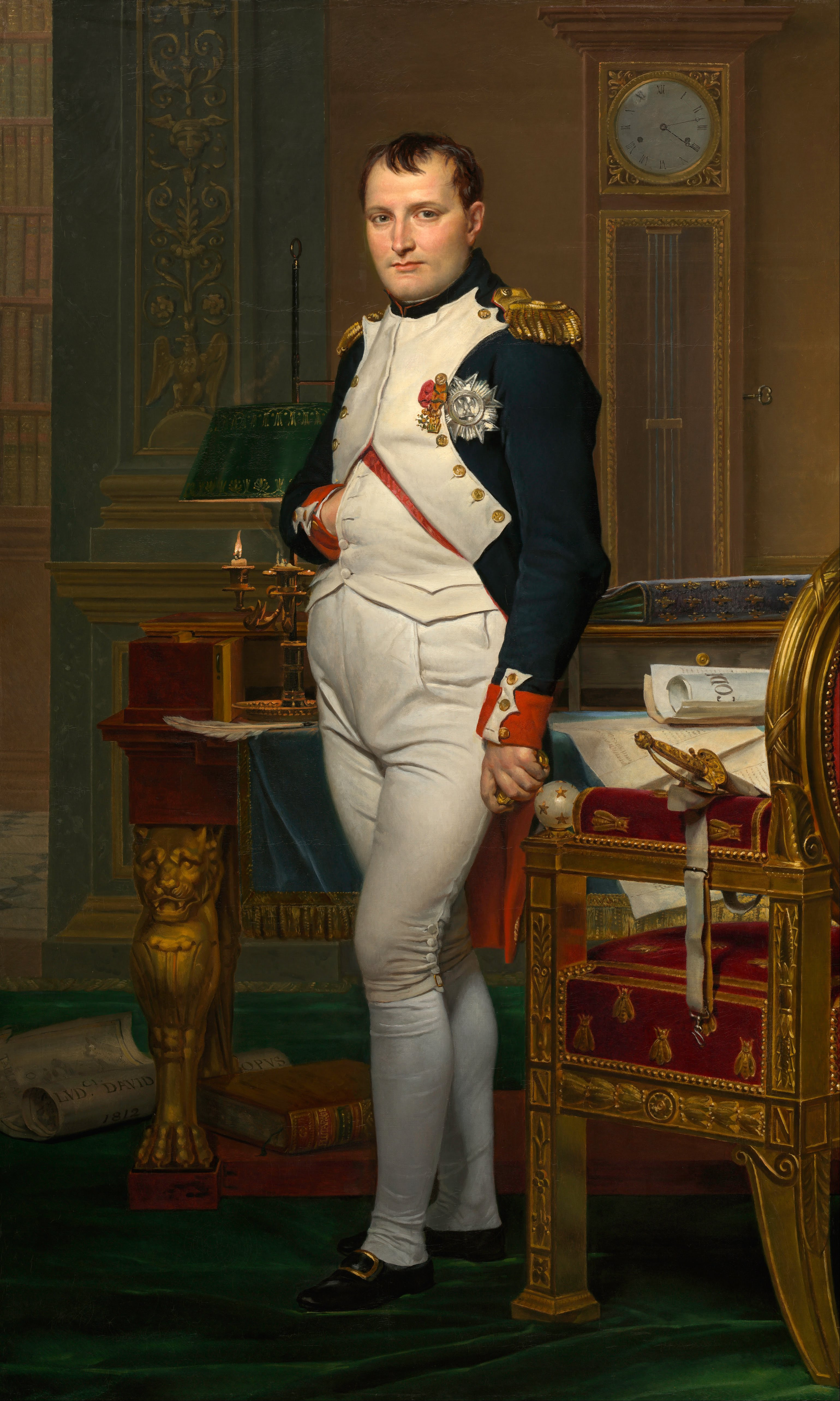
Napoleon Bonaparte

- 1800–1823: Pope Pius VII
- 1801: Queen Dowager Jeongsun bans Christianity from Korea.
- July 16, 1802: French Concordat of 1801. The Catholic Church re-established in France.
- December 2, 1804: Napoleon crowns himself Emperor of the French in the Cathedral of Notre Dame, Paris, in the presence of Pope Pius VII.
- August 6, 1806: Dissolution of the Holy Roman Empire
- 1823: Ludwig van Beethoven finishes his Missa solemnis, started in 1819, and dedicates it to his friend and pupil, Archduke Rudolf of Austria, archbishop of Olomouc.
- 1829: The Roman Catholic Relief Act 1829, also known as the Catholic Emancipation Act 1829, is passed by Parliament in the United Kingdom.
- 1830: the Chaldean Church leaves the Church of the East to reunite with the Roman Catholic Church
- 1837: Arrival of the French Catholic Missionaries in Korea.
- 1839: In a papal letter, Pope Gregory XVI declared the official opposition of the Catholic Church to the slave trade and to slavery. In the United States, Catholic slaveholders generally ignored the papal pronouncement and continued to participate in the institution of slavery.
- 1842: The University of Notre Dame is founded in Notre Dame, Indiana, by Edward Sorin of the Congregation of Holy Cross.
- 1846: Pope Pius IX begins his reign. During his reign he asks that an anti-Catholic document written by Freemasons known as the Alta Vendita be distributed to alert Catholic officials of possible Masonic infiltration.
- 1847: The Latin Patriarch of Jerusalem resumes residence in Jerusalem.
- 1848: John Bosco, priest, writer and educator, founds the Salesians, a religious community based on the spirituality and the philosophy of Francis de Sales, a Catholic bishop of Geneva
- 1850: The Archdiocese of Westminster and twelve other dioceses are set up, re-establishing a Catholic hierarchy for the Catholic public in the United Kingdom against intense political opposition. Westminster Cathedral is formally consecrated 53 years later, in 1903.
- 1852: The First Plenary Council of Baltimore is held in the United States.
- 1854: Dogma of the Immaculate Conception by Pope Pius IX
- 1856: Gregor Mendel, Augustinian friar, scientist, and father of genetics, begins experiments that lead to the fundamental laws of inheritance.
- 1858: Apparitions in Lourdes.
- December 10, 1859: Ateneo de Manila University established in Intramuros, Manila, Philippines was also known as Escuela Municipal de Manila. But later the Ateneo is located at Loyola Heights, Quezon City.
- 1862: Paulo Miki and his companions, martyred in Nagasaki, Japan (1597), are canonized by Pope Pius IX.
- 1863: La Salle University (now De La Salle University) established in Manila, Philippines.
- 1865: The Society of African Missions of Lyon establishes a mission in Lagos, Nigeria. The same Society establishes a mission in Benin, five years later.
- 1866: Cardinal John Henry Newman finishes his autobiography, Apologia Pro Vita Sua.
- December 8, 1869: Pope Pius IX opens the First Ecumenical Council of the Vatican
- July 18, 1870 – The Dogmatic Constitution of the Church of Christ from the fourth session of Vatican I, Pastor Aeternus, issues the dogma of papal infallibility among other issues before the fall of Rome in the Franco-Prussian War causes it to end prematurely and brings an end to the Papal States. Controversy over several issues leads to the formation of the Old Catholic Church. This council was not formally closed until 1960 by Pope John XXIII in preparation for the Second Vatican Council.
- 1873–75: The enactment of the Falk Laws, legislation in Germany during the Kulturkampf conflict with the Church which led to the expulsion of some religious orders from Germany. English poet and Jesuit, Gerard Manley Hopkins, dedicated his famous poem "The Wreck of the Deutschland" to five nuns who were forced to flee Germany because of the Laws and later drowned in a shipwreck.
- 1877: Francis de Sales is made a Doctor of the Church.
- 1878: Cardinal Charles Lavigerie, archbishop of Algiers and Carthage, sends ten missionaries to East Africa.
- 1879: Encyclical Aeterni Patris, by Pope Leo XIII, prepares a revival of Thomism.
- 1888: The Pontifical Catholic University of Chile is founded. In 2018, it ranked #1 university of Latin America by QS rankings.
- 1891: San Sebastian Church completed in Quiapo, Manila, Philippines.
- May 15, 1891: Pope Leo XIII issues encyclical Rerum novarum (Of New Things).
- November 30, 1894: Pope Leo XIII publishes the Encyclical Orientalium Dignitas (On the Churches of the East) safeguarding the importance and continuance of the Eastern traditions for the whole church.
- 1895: Mark Twain's Personal Reflections of Joan of Arc is published by Harper's Magazine.
- 1896: Pope Leo XIII formally declares Anglican orders "absolutely null and void" in papal bull, Apostolicae Curae.
- 1897: Thérèse of Lisieux dies.
- 1898: Secondo Pia takes the first photographs of the Shroud of Turin.

=== 20th century ===
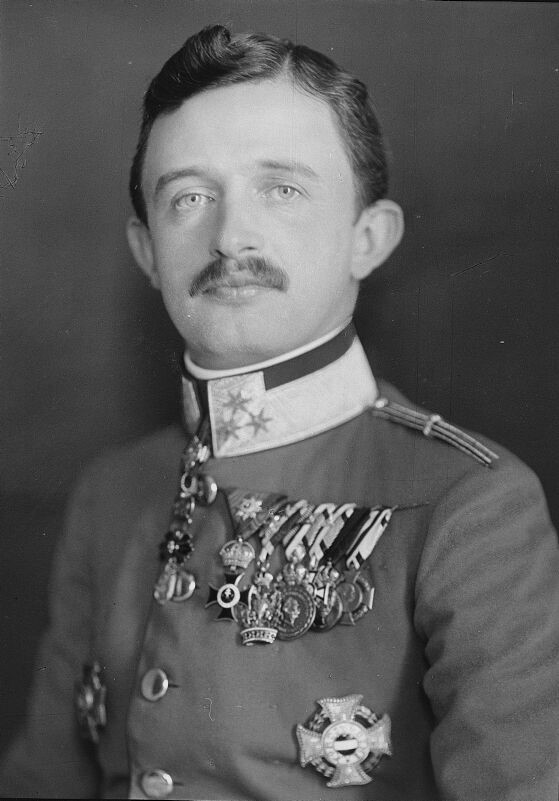
Charles I of Austria

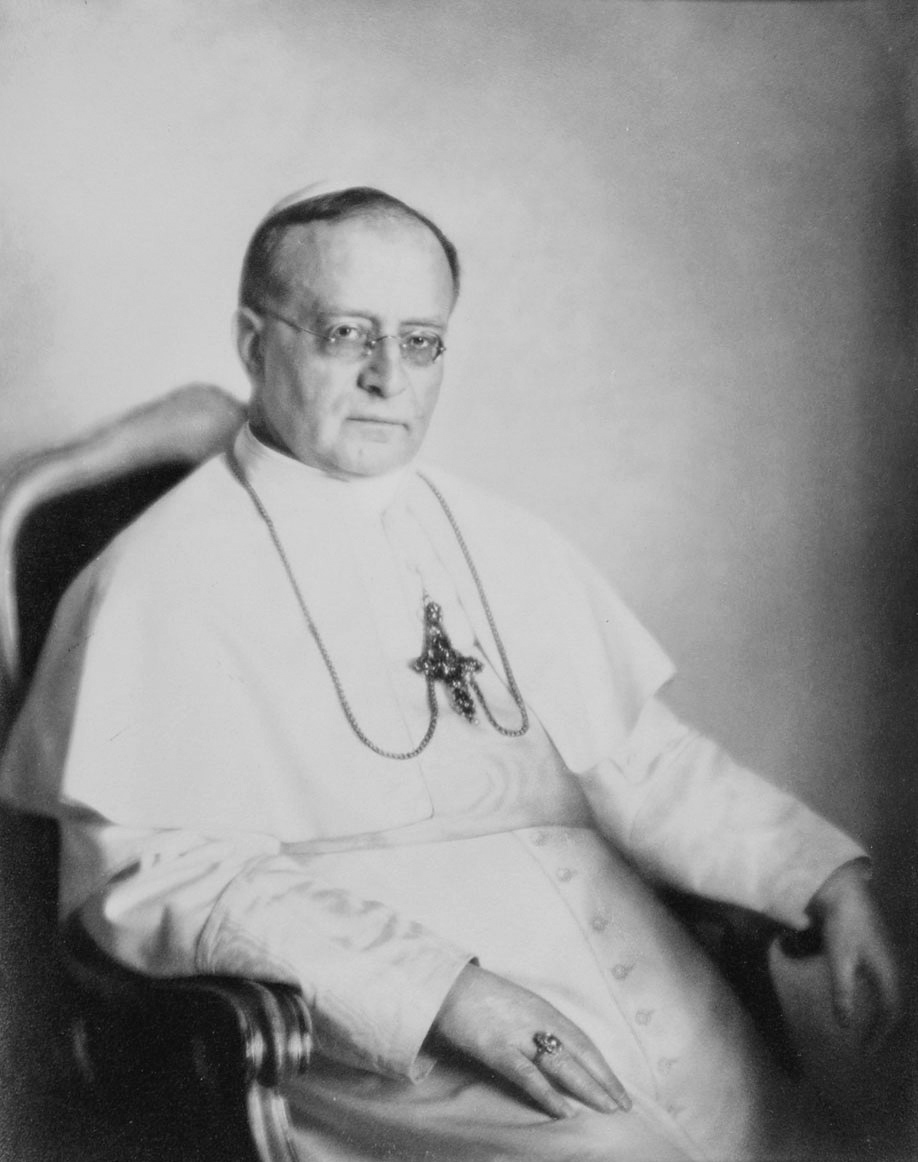
Pope Pius XI

- 1900: Edward Elgar sets to music Cardinal John Henry Newman's The Dream of Gerontius.
- June 29, 1906: The Consecration of Jorge Barlin as First Filipino and First Bicolano Bishop of the Diocese of Nueva Caceres (now. Roman Catholic Archdiocese of Cáceres) in Naga City, Camarines Sur, Philippines.
- October 5, 1907: First Canonical Coronation of the Philippines including Our Lady of La Naval de Manila in Intramuros, Manila, Philippines.
- June 16, 1911: The Establishment of La Salle University (now. De La Salle University) in Manila, Philippines.
- 1903–1914: Pope Pius X publishes Lamentabili sane exitu against Modernism, introduces frequent communion, and promotes Gregorian chant.
- 1914–1918: Pope Benedict XV declares neutrality during World War I. His peace initiatives are rejected by both sides as favoring the other. Massive papal charity in Europe.
- 1916: Charles I of Austria is crowned Emperor of the Austro-Hungarian Empire. Charles attempted to negotiate peace between the warring nations during World War I. His attempts at peace are largely ignored.
- 1917: Pope Benedict XV promulgates the 1917 Code of Canon Law for the Latin Church, the first official comprehensive codification of Catholic canon law in history. The apparition of Our Lady of Fátima occurs in Fátima, Portugal, over the course of six months ending in the Miracle of the Sun. This apparition is very popular throughout the century.
- 1918: Persecution of the Roman Catholic Church and especially the Eastern Catholic Churches in the Soviet Union (until 1985).
- 1922: Emperor Charles I of Austria dies in exile and poverty in Portugal. Later to become beatified as Blessed Charles.
- 1922: G. K. Chesterton, philosopher, poet, and writer, converts to Catholicism.
- 1925: Holy Year proclaimed by Pope Pius XI. John Vianney, French priest referred to as the Cure d'Ars, is canonized by Pope Pius XI.
- 1926: Beginning of Church persecutions in Mexico until 1940, also known as the Cristero War or La Cristiada.
- March 19, 1927: Foundation of the Sisters of the Destitute (SD) at Chunungumvely, Kerala by Mar Varghese Payyappilly Palakkappilly.
- 1927: Georges Lemaître, Belgian priest scientist, first proposed on theoretical grounds that the universe was expanding. In addition, he was first to ascertain what is now known as Hubble's law. He also proposed what became known as the Big Bang.
- October 2, 1928: Josemaría Escrivá founded Opus Dei, a worldwide organization of lay members of the Catholic Church.
- 1928: Sigrid Undset wins the Nobel Prize in Literature.
- February 11, 1929: The Lateran Treaty is signed by Benito Mussolini and Cardinal Gasparri establishing the independent State of the Vatican City and resolving the Roman Question between Italy and the Holy See since the seizure of the Papal States in 1870.
- October 5, 1929: Death of Varghese Payyappilly Palakkappilly, founder of Sisters of the Destitute.
- February 12, 1931: Vatican Radio is set up by Guglielmo Marconi and inaugurated by Pope Pius XI. First signal broadcast is in Morse code: In nomine Domini, amen.
- 1931–1936: Persecution of the Church in Spain. It is estimated that in the course of the Red Terror (Spain), 6,832 members of the Catholic clergy were killed.
- July 20, 1933: Concordat Between the Holy See and the German Reich signed by Cardinal Eugenio Pacelli and Franz von Papen on behalf of Pope Pius XI and President Paul von Hindenburg, respectively.
- 1933: Dorothy Day co-founded the Catholic Worker with Peter Maurin.
- December 8, 1933: Pope Pius XI canonized Bernadette Soubirous of Lourdes.
- 1935: Sir Thomas More and John Fisher, English martyrs, executed under the reign of Henry VIII, are canonized by Pope Pius XI.
- July 16, 1935: Declaration of Our Lady of Guadalupe as "Heavenly Patroness of the Philippines" and is home of the national shrine in Makati City, Metro Manila.
- 1937: Mit brennender Sorge encyclical against National Socialism by Pope Pius XI, written by Cardinals Eugenio Pacelli and Michael von Faulhaber.
- February 3–7, 1937: The 33rd International Eucharistic Congress held in Manila, Philippines. The first congress in Asia and the first congress held in the Philippines.
- September 1, 1939: Germany invades Poland, start of the Second World War. The Vatican, after trying to avoid the war, declares neutrality to avoid being drawn into the conflict. Massive Vatican relief intervention for displaced persons, prisoners of war and needy civilians in Europe.
- 1939: St Patrick's Cathedral, Melbourne, Victoria, Australia, was finished being built.
- 1940: Graham Greene publishes The Power and the Glory.
- During World War II: Convents, monasteries, and the Vatican are used to hide Jews and others targeted by the Nazis for extermination (see The Myth of Hitler's Pope). Maximilian Kolbe is martyred in Auschwitz concentration camp after volunteering to die in place of a stranger. The Nazis imprison and at times execute Catholic clergy, monks and nuns who criticize Nazi ideology.
- September 12, 1942: Declaration of the Immaculate Concepcion as "Principal Patroness of the Philippines" and is home of the Manila Cathedral in Intramuros, Manila, Philippines.
- 1943: Encyclical of Pope Pius XII Mystici corporis describing the Catholic Church as the Body of Christ;
- 1943: Encyclical Divino afflante Spiritu, opening biblical research to Catholic scholars
- 1943: Year of the founding of the lay association Focolare Movement by Chiara Lubich. The Movement promotes the ideals of unity and universal brotherhood.
- 1944: The German Army occupies Rome. Adolf Hitler proclaims he will respect Vatican neutrality; however several incidents, such as giving aid to downed Allied airmen, nearly cause Nazi Germany to invade the Vatican. Rome is liberated by the Allies after only a few weeks of occupation.
- 1945: Evelyn Waugh publishes Brideshead Revisited.
- 1945: The Eight Churches in Intramuros, Manila, destroyed during the 1945 Battle of Manila.
- February 15, 1945: The Catholic Bishops' Conference of the Philippines (CBCP) is founded in Manila was become as "Catholic Welfare Organization".
- 1945: Battle of Manila: turning point in war in the Pacific; heavy losses of life and property.
- 1948: Thomas Merton, Trappist contemplative, publishes The Seven Storey Mountain.
- August 18, – September 26, 1948: The Marian Apparitions of Our Lady, Mediatrix of All Grace in Lipa City, Batangas, Philippines, are witnessed to Sis. Teresita Castillo.
- October 14, 1949: Gabriel Reyes is the First Filipino Archbishop of the Archdiocese of Manila in the Philippines.
- 1950: Holy Year declared by Pope Pius XII, who announced on December 25, 1950, that the Tomb of Saint Peter had been identified by archeologists underneath Saint Peter Basilica; canonization of Pope Pius X and Maria Goretti; encyclical Humani generis
- 1950: The Assumption of Mary is defined as dogma by Pius XII
- April 9, 1951: Formal Establishment of the Relations Between the Philippines and Holy See.
- 1952: Francois Mauriac wins Nobel Prize in Literature. He wrote the foreword to Elie Wiesel's book Night, having encouraged Wiesel earlier to write about his experiences as a Jew during the Holocaust.
- January 7–29, 1953: First Plenary Council of the Philippines.
- 1954: First Marian year in church history proclaimed by Pius XII; new feast Queenship of Mary.
- 1954: J.R.R. Tolkien publishes The Lord of the Rings, filled with Christian and Catholic themes.
- 1954: Lay ecclesial movement Communion and Liberation founded.
- 1957: Bernard Lonergan publishes Insight: A Study of Human Understanding.
- 1957: Francis Poulenc, composes his opera, Dialogues des Carmelites and two years later, the Gloria.
- 1958: The Post-War Manila Cathedral in Intramuros, Manila, Philippines, is completed after the Allied Liberation of Manila.
- 1960: Senator John F. Kennedy is elected, the first Roman Catholic president in United States history.
- March 28, 1960: Rufino Santos became the First Filipino Cardinal and became the 29th Archbishop of the Archdiocese of Manila in the Philippines.
- October 11, 1962: Pope John XXIII opens the Second Ecumenical Vatican Council. The 21st ecumenical council of the Catholic Church emphasized the universal call to holiness and brought many changes in practices, including an increased emphasis on ecumenism; fewer rules on penances, fasting and other devotional practices; and initiating a revision of the Mass, which was made more accessible by allowing the use of native languages instead of Latin. Opposition to changes inspired by the Council gives rise to the movement of Traditionalist Catholics who disagree with changing the old forms of worship and disagree with the rise of previously condemned philosophies. End of Oath against modernism.
- 1962: Martin de Porres, a Peruvian lay brother, is canonized by Pope John XXIII.
- 1964: Charles Lwanga and his companions, martyred in Namugongo, Uganda (1885–87), are canonized by Pope Paul VI.
- 1964: Year of the founding of the lay movement Neocatechumenal Way by Kiko Argnello and Carmen Hernandez.
- December 7, 1965: Joint Catholic-Orthodox Declaration of Pope Paul VI and the Ecumenical Patriarch Athenagoras I. Mutual excommunication of the Great Schism of 1054 against Catholic and Orthodox is lifted by both parties.
- December 8, 1965: Pope Paul VI solemnly closes the Second Vatican Council.
- 1966: Roman Catholic Index of Prohibited Books abolished.
- 1967: Catholic Charismatic Renewal Movement is established.
- 1968: Second Episcopal Conference of Latin America at Medellín, Colombia, in follow-up to Vatican II. Latin American bishops call for "a preferential option for the poor" and give their approval to Christian "base communities".
- 1968: Year of the founding of the international lay group Community of Sant'Egidio by Andrea Riccardi.
- 1969: The Inauguration of Radyo Veritas (now. Veritas 846 (DZRV)) are stationed in Quezon City, Metro Manila, Philippines.
- 1970: Revision of the Roman Missal, following on introduction of vernacular languages in celebration of Mass.
- 1970: Pope Paul VI canonizes the Forty Martyrs of England and Wales.
- 1970: Catherine of Siena made Doctor of the Church.
- November 27, to 29, 1970: Pope Paul VI visits the Philippines.
- 1971: Flannery O'Connor's Complete Stories are published.
- 1973: Agnes Katsuko Sasagawa in the remote area of Yuzawadai, near the city of Akita in Japan, reports seeing a number of apparitions now known as Our Lady of Akita.
- 1973: Gustavo Gutierrez, Peruvian theologian, Dominican priest, and founder of Liberation Theology, publishes a pivotal book, A Theology of Liberation: History, Politics and Salvation.
- 1973: Year of the founding of the Chemin Neuf Community by Jesuit priest, Laurent Fabre.
- 1975–83: Olivier Messiaen composes Saint-Francois d'Assise. He is organist at Eglise de la Sainte-Trinite, Paris from 1931 until his death in 1992.
- August 26, 1978: Pope John Paul I becomes the first pope to use a double regnal name. He reigns for only 33 days.
- October 16, 1978: Pope John Paul II becomes the first Polish pope and first non-Italian pope elected in 450 years; influential in overthrowing communism in Poland.
- 1979: Mother Teresa awarded the Nobel Peace Prize.
- 1979: Third Episcopal Conference of Latin America, at Puebla, Mexico, confirms option for the poor and asks affluent nations “not to put obstacles in our way to progress.”
- March 24, 1980: Oscar Romero, archbishop of San Salvador, El Salvador, is assassinated while celebrating Mass at the Divine Providence Hospital.
- 1980: Czeslaw Milosz wins Nobel Prize in Literature.
- 1981: Henryk Gorecki composes Miserere (Gorecki).
- February 17–22, 1981: Pope John Paul II second visit to Philippines.
- February 18, 1981: Beatification of Lorenzo Ruiz and companions by Pope John Paul II held at Rizal Park, Manila, Philippines.
- 1983: Pope John Paul II promulgates the 1983 Code of Canon Law, a new code of canon law for the Latin Church.
- 1983: Lech Wałęsa awarded the Nobel Peace Prize.
- 1984: First World Youth Day instituted by Pope John Paul II celebrated in Rome. Celebrated every year between Rome and a different city.
- 1984: 103 Korean Martyrs are canonized by Pope John Paul II.
- August 20, 1984: El Shaddai DWXI Prayer Partners Fellowship International, largest Catholic Charismatic Renewal movement group in the Philippines, is established by Brother Mike Velarde as Servant Leader and Most Reverend Teodoro C. Bacani, Jr. as Spiritual Adviser.
- February 25, 1986: Manila Archbishop Cardinal Jaime Sin mobilizes People Power in Metro Manila, Philippines; President Ferdinand Marcos ousted.
- 1987: Marian year announced by John Paul II in the encyclical Redemptoris Mater.
- October 18, 1987: Lorenzo Ruiz, layperson of the Archdiocese of Manila, Philippines, is canonized by Pope John Paul II as the first Filipino saint.
- June 30, 1988: Archbishop Marcel Lefebvre of the Society of St. Pius X (SSPX) consecrates four men as bishops at Écône, Switzerland, without the express permission of the Pope. Lefebvre et al. automatically incur excommunication. Traditionalist bishops of the SSPX continue to be suspended a divinis.
- 1990: Pope John Paul II promulgates the Code of Canons of the Eastern Churches, a reform of Eastern Catholic canon law.
- January 1991: Australian Catholic University opens.
- January 20 – February 17, 1991: Second Plenary Council in the Philippines.
- 1991: The Soviet Union is officially dissolved. Persecuted Catholic Church re-emerges from hiding, especially in Ukraine and Lithuania.
- Fourth Episcopal Conference of Latin America, at Santo Domingo, Dominican Republic, showed a discontinuity with other conferences, as it was heavily controlled by conservative elements and by Rome.
- 1992: The new Catechism of the Catholic Church is published, in Latin and French.
- 1993: Crossroad Publishers publishes Content of Faith: the Best of Karl Rahner Theological Writings.
- 1993: Duns Scotus beatified by Pope John Paul II.
- 1994: Ordinatio sacerdotalis, an Apostolic Letter upholding a prohibition against ordination of women to the priesthood, is promulgated by Pope John Paul II.
- January 10, to 15, 1995: World Youth Day 1995 in Manila, Philippines, and third visit by Pope John Paul II.
- 1997: Therese of Lisieux is made a Doctor of the Church.
- 1997: The Publishing of Catechism For Filipino Catholics are available in the Philippines.

== Third millennium ==
=== 21st century ===
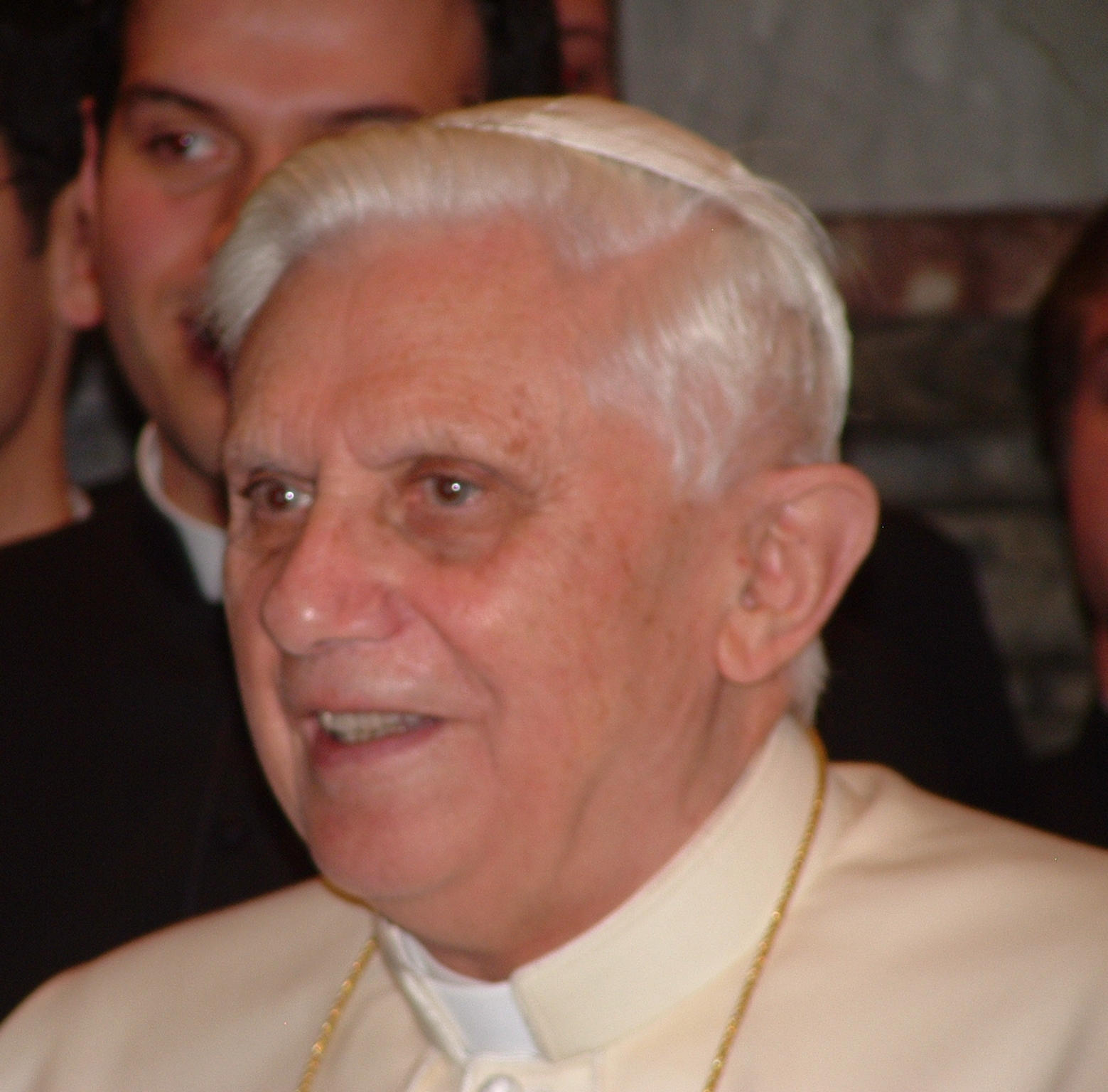
Benedict XVI, first Pope elected in 21st century

- March 5, 2000: Beatification of Pedro Calungsod by Pope John Paul II held at the Vatican is a second Filipino martyr of the Philippines.
- April 30, 2000: Pope John Paul II canonizes Faustina Kowalska and designates the Sunday after Easter as Divine Mercy Sunday in the General Roman Calendar, with effect from the following year.
- January 1, 2001: The 21st century and the new millennium begin. The church solemnizes the start of the third Christian millennium by extending into part of the year 2001 the jubilee year that it observes at 25-year intervals and that, in the case of the year 2000, is called the Great Jubilee.
- January 6, 2001: John Paul II issues Novo Millennio Ineunte, a program for the church in the new millennium, wherein he placed sanctity through a training in prayer as the most important priority of the Catholic Church in consonance with its purpose.
- January 18, 2002: Former American priest John Geoghan is convicted of child molestation and sentenced to ten years in prison, as part of the Catholic sex abuse scandal. The Geoghan case implicated Archbishop Cardinal Bernard Francis Law who resigned in December, and brought attention to the problem.
- January 25, to 26, 2003: 4th World Meeting of Families at Rizal Park in Manila, Philippines.
- 2004: Cambridge University Press publishes The Cambridge Companion to Hans Urs von Balthasar, a scholarly appraisal of his writings.
- April 2, 2005: Pope John Paul II dies at the age of 84. His funeral is broadcast worldwide and attended by millions in Rome.
- April 19, 2005: German-born Cardinal Joseph Alois Ratzinger is elected by the College of Cardinals as Pope Benedict XVI, thus becoming the first Pope elected during the 21st century and the 3rd millennium.
- August 18, 2005: Pope Benedict XVI attends the World Youth Day in Cologne, Germany, his first trip outside Italy.
- January 9, 2006: The 400th Year Anniversary of the Translation of the Black Nazarene is held at Minor Basilica of the Black Nazarene in Quiapo, Manila, Philippines; it arrived from Acapulco, Mexico in 1606.
- September 12, 2006: Pope Benedict XVI delivers address on Faith, Reason and the University at the University of Regensburg, decrying the emphasis in the Western world on positivistic reason and philosophy, excluding the divine and dialogue with cultures. He quotes negative views of Emperor Manuel II Paleologus regarding Islam, creating violent reactions among Muslims in several parts of the world.
- June 11, 2007: Pope Benedict XVI reverted the decision of his predecessor regarding papal elections, and restored the traditional two-thirds majority required.
- July 7, 2007: With his motu proprio Summorum Pontificum Pope Benedict XVI explicitly allows all priests of the Latin Church to use the 1962 Roman Missal when celebrating Mass privately and, under certain conditions, publicly instead of the post-Vatican II Mass, and expressed the wish that this measure would lead to healing the division between the Society of Saint Pius X and the Catholic Church.
- October 28, 2007: Pope Benedict XVI authorizes the largest beatification ceremony in church history involving 498 Spanish Martyrs who were killed during the Civil War in Spain.
- 2007: Fifth Episcopal Conference of Latin America at Aparecida, Brazil. Cardinal Jorge Bergoglio – later Pope Francis – served as secretary and helped draft the final document which emphasized what would also be a theme of his pontificate: serving the poor in the peripheries of society.
- August 13, 2007: The Launching of TV Maria are stationed in Manila, Philippines.
- May 2008: A solemn declaration agreed on between Pope Benedict XVI and Muslims, led by Mahdi Mostafavi, stressed that genuine religion is essentially non-violent and that violence can be justified neither by reason nor by faith.
- July 2008: Pope Benedict XVI participates in Sydney, Australia, in the World Youth Day and announces Spain as the country to host the next one.
- January 2009: The Holy See remits the excommunications of the bishops of the Society of St. Pius X, which had had a schismatic relationship with the Catholic Magisterium.
- October 11, 2009: Father Damien, a Belgian priest known as the "Apostle of the Lepers", is canonized.
- November 20, to 27, 2009: The 5th Asian Youth Day in Imus City, Cavite, Philippines.
- April 19, to 22, 2010: The 1st Philippine Apostolic Congress on Mercy was held in the Philippines.
- October 17, 2010: Mary MacKillop, a nun of Scottish descent, is the first Australian born person to be canonized. Also canonized is Holy Cross lay brother, Andre Bessette of Montreal, Canada, whose efforts led to the building of Saint Joseph's Oratory, Montreal.
- October 21, 2012: Kateri Tekakwitha, Algonquin-Mohawk laywoman known as the "Lily of the Mohawks", is canonized by Pope Benedict XVI.
- October 21, 2012: Pedro Calungsod, young layperson of the Archdiocese of Cebu, Philippines, is canonized by Pope Benedict XVI and becomes the Second Filipino saint and First Visayan.
- 2012: Hildegard of Bingen is made a Doctor of the Church.
- February 2013: Resignation of Pope Benedict XVI.
- March 2013: Jorge Bergoglio of Argentina elected as Pope Francis, the first Latin American and the first Jesuit to be elected Pope.
- May 12, 2013: Pope Francis canonizes over 800 Catholics that were killed by Turks in Otranto, 1480. With this he surpassed the record of John Paul II in canonizing the most saints in a pontificate.
- October 13, 2013: José María of Manila was beatified by Cardinal Angelo Amato in Tarragona, Spain and he became the Spanish-Filipino Martyr.
- October 16–18, 2013: First Philippine Conference of New Evangelization by Manila Archbishop Cardinal Luis Antonio Tagle at the Quadricentennial Pavilion of the University of Santo Tomas (UST) in Manila for the video message of Pope Francis.
- January 15–19, 2015: Pope Francis visit to the Philippines, the fourth papal visit.
- February 2015: Charles Maung Bo and Soane Patita Mafi are the first cardinals from Myanmar and Tonga.
- May 2015: Pope Francis in his encyclical Laudato si' (Praise be to you) drew attention to "our sin" of destroying the natural environment and met with Big Oil CEOs to drive home the message.
- May 23, 2015: Oscar Romero, the assassinated Archbishop of San Salvador, is beatified by Pope Francis.
- 2015: Beatification of the Three Martyrs of Chimbote, murdered in 1991 in Chimbote, Peru, by members of the communist guerrilla group, the Shining Path.
- April 12, 2015: on Divine Mercy Sunday, during a Mass for the centennial of the Armenian genocide at St. Peter's Basilica, Pope Francis officially proclaimed Gregory of Narek as Doctor of the Church in the presence of Armenian President Serzh Sargsyan, Catholicos of All Armenians Karekin II, Catholicos of Cilicia Aram I, and Armenian Catholic Patriarch Nerses Bedros XIX Tarmouni.
- December 8, 2015 to November 20, 2016: In The Extraordinary Jubilee Year of Mercy proclaimed by Pope Francis, Rome received 21.3 million pilgrims, shrine of Our Lady of Guadalupe received 22 million pilgrims, and World Youth Day in Kraków received 3 million pilgrims. According to archbishop Fisichella, president of Pontifical Council for New Evangelization, between 56% and 62% of all Catholics participated in the events while pilgrims in Rome mostly came from Germany, US, Poland, Spanish speaking countries and many from China, Chad, Rwanda, Nepal and Cook Islands.
- January 24–31, 2016: The 51st International Eucharistic Congress held in Cebu City, Philippines, by Papal Legate Charles Maung Bo of Myanmar. the second time in the Philippines since 1937.
- February 12, 2016: Patriarch Kirill of Moscow, the head of the Russian Orthodox Church, meets Pope Francis at José Martí International Airport near Havana, Cuba. They sign a thirty point joint declaration addressing global issues including their hope for re–establishment of full unity, the persecution of Christians in the Middle East, the Syrian Civil War, and church organisation in Ukraine. This was the first meeting between a pope and a Russian Orthodox patriarch.
- July 26, 2016: French priest Jacques Hamel is murdered in the parish of Saint-Etienne-du-Rouvray by two extremists who pledged allegiance to the Islamic State of Iraq and the Levant. The Diocese of Rouen has opened his cause for canonization.
- January 16, to 20, 2017: The 4th World Apostolic Congress on Mercy was held in Manila, Philippines.
- November 2, 2017: Pope Francis suggests recruiting "proven" married men to become priests for dioceses in the Roman/Latin/Western Church where there are few priests (as do the Eastern Catholic Churches).
- May 13, 2017: Pope Francis canonizes Francisco and Jacinta Marto, witnesses to the Marian apparitions at Fatima, Portugal.
- December 18, 2017: Pope Francis named priest-communicator Patrick Peyton venerable. Peyton founded the international Family Rosary Crusade and Family Theater radio and television programs.
- March 19, 2018: In his apostolic exhortation Gaudete et exsultate (Rejoice and Be Glad), Pope Francis picks up on a theme of Vatican II, explaining that all are called to the same perfection of virtue.
- May 18, 2018: Bishops of Chile offer their resignations to Pope Francis owing to criminal negligence in dealing with child sexual abuse among some clerics. Francis accepts the resignations of bishops and cardinals in other countries for similar reasons. Francis faces a far worse crisis among clergy—child abuse and lack of effective episcopal oversight.
- August 2, 2018: Pope Francis declares the death penalty is unacceptable in all cases, as an attack on human dignity.
- December 17, 2018: The Holy See recognizes the Orthodox Church of Ukraine.
- July 1, 2019: The canonization of John Henry Newman authorized and the date set for October 13, 2019.
- July 2, 2019: it was announced that Pope Francis had transferred the nine bone fragments of St, Peter which were displayed during the 'Year of Faith' Mass, to Orthodox Ecumenical Patriarch Bartholomew of Constantinople. Bartholomew, who serves as head of the Eastern Orthodox Christian church, described the gesture as “brave and bold.”
- July 5, 2019: Pope Francis says the Russian Orthodox Church is attempting to manipulate other religions (denominations) in Ukraine.
- September 17, 2019: Pope Francis lunch together with Ecumenical Patriarch Bartholomew I at Domus Sanctae Marthae.
- October 5, 2019: Pope Francis appoints 13 new cardinals during a ceremony at the Vatican.
- October 6, 2019: The Synod of Bishops for the Pan-Amazon region begins.
- October 10, 2019: The Episcopal Conference of Poland has agreed to begin the canonization process for the parents of John Paul II.
- December 15, 2019: First Papal Celebration of Simbang Gabi was held at Vatican City by Pope Francis among the Filipino Catholic Communities.
- May 1, 2020: Luis Antonio Tagle of the Archbishop Emeritus of the Archdiocese of Manila as the First Filipino Cardinal-Bishop.
- 2021: The Philippines was celebrated by the 500th Year Anniversary of the Arrival of the Christianity since 1521 in Cebu City was arrival of the Spanish Colonizers and the commemoration of Santo Niño de Cebú under the Quincentennial Celebrations.
- December 31, 2022: Pope Benedict XVI dies at the age of 95.
- April 21, 2025: Pope Francis dies at the age of 88, after a period of illness. His funeral is held on 26 April 2025.
- May 9, 2025: Pope Leo XIV was the first American and the first from the Order of Saint Augustine to be elected as the new pope.
- November 28, 2025: Pope Leo XIV and Bartholomew I commemorate the 1,700 year anniversary of the Council of Nicea. They jointly pray the Nicene Creed; the Filioque was omitted.

== See also ==
- History of the Catholic Church
- Legal history of the Catholic Church
- History of the papacy
- Great Church
- Timeline of Christianity
- Ecclesiastical history of the Catholic Church
- History according to the Catholic Church
- List of countries by first Catholic diocese
