= Diocese of Niigata =

Roman Catholic diocese in Japan

Coordinates: 37°55′29.18″N 139°2′19.86″E

Diocese of Niigata Dioecesis Niigataënsis カトリック新潟教区
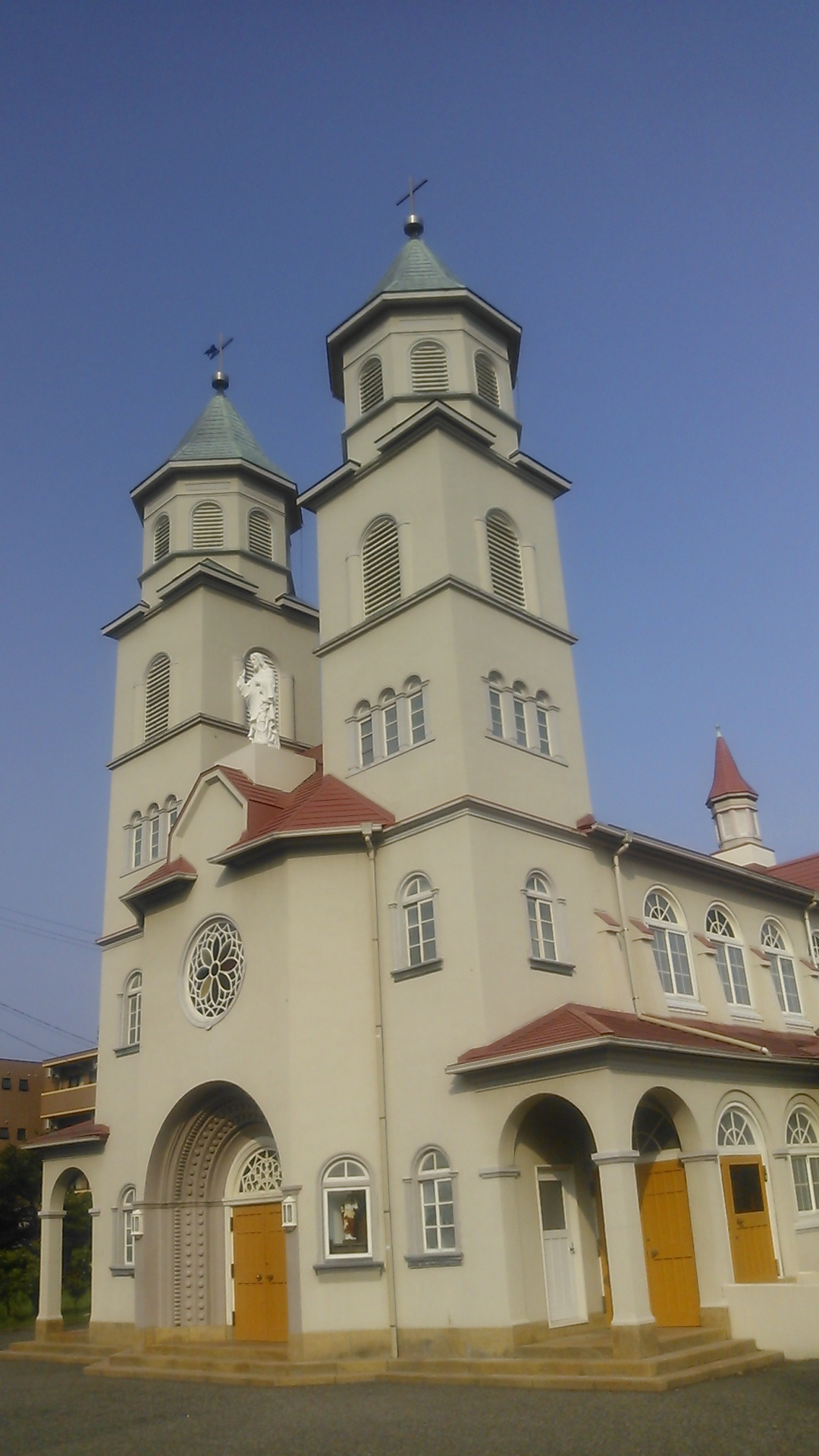
- Cathedral of Christ the King

Location
- Country: Japan
- Territory: Niigata, Yamagata, and Akita
- Ecclesiastical province: Tokyo
- Metropolitan: Tokyo

Statistics
- Area: 33,517 km^{2} (12,941 sq mi)
- Population: Total; Catholics: (as of 2004); 4,850,802; 7,711 (0.2%)

Information
- Rite: Latin Rite
- Cathedral: Cathedral of Christ the King in Niigata

Current leadership
- Pope: Leo XIV
- Bishop: Paul Daisuke Narui, S.V.D.
- Metropolitan Archbishop: Tarcisio Isao Kikuchi, S.V.D.

Map
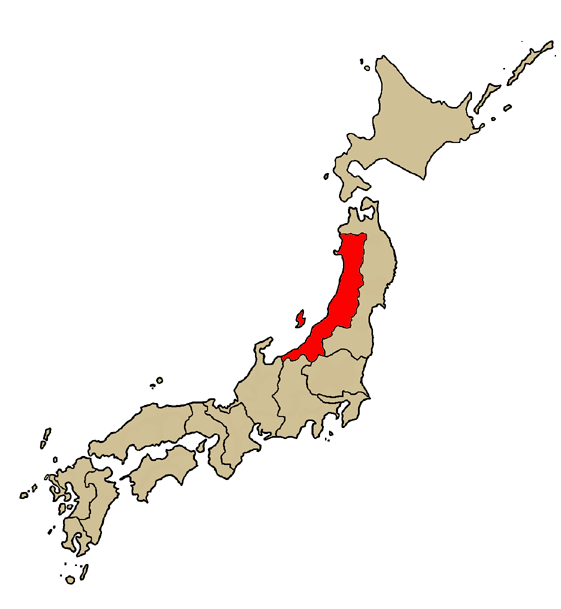

Website
- Website of the Diocese

The Diocese of Niigata (Latin: Dioecesis Niigataënsis, Japanese: カトリック新潟教区 ) is a Latin Church diocese of the Catholic Church located in the city of Niigata in the ecclesiastical province of Tokyo in Japan.

The apparitions of Our Lady of Akita were within its territory and Bishop John Shojiro Ito initially approved the apparitions in 1984.

== History ==
French botanist Father Urbain Faurie was one of the early missionaries to the Niigata area, who arrived in Japan in July 1873. On August 13, 1912, the Apostolic Prefecture of Niigata was established from part of the Diocese of Hakodate. The first Apostolic Prefect was Msgr. Joseph Reiners S.V.D. of the Society of the Divine Word. On April 16, 1962 the Prefecture was raised to a Diocese; the first bishop was John Shojiro Ito.

In 1984, the Grey Nuns of the Cross (Sisters of Charity of Ottawa) established the Élisabeth Bruyère Convent in the city of Yamagata, where they worked closely with the Missionaries of the Sacred Heart. The sisters' apostolate includes parish ministry, teaching kindergarten, as well as, at the Maria Komakusa Day Care Center. They also minister to the elderly.

On October 25, 2017, Bishop Kikuchi was appointed Archbishop of Tokyo. The See of Niigata became vacant and the Kikuchi was appointed Apostolic Administrator.

== Leadership ==
Bishops of Niigata

- Paul Daisuke Narui (May 31, 2020 – present)
- Tarcisio Isao Kikuchi (タルチシオ菊地功), S.V.D. (September 20, 2004 – October 25, 2017)
- Francis Keiichi Sato (フランシスコ佐藤敬一), O.F.M. (March 9, 1985 – May 14, 2004)
- John Shojiro Ito (使徒ヨハネ伊藤庄治郎) (April 4, 1962 – March 9, 1985)

Prefects Apostolic of Niigata 新潟

- John Baptist Tokisuke Noda (ヨハネ・バプティスタ野田時助) (March 13, 1953 – October 11, 1961)
- Peter Magoshiro Matsuoka (ペトロ松岡孫四郎) (1941 – 1953)
- Anton Ceska (アントン・テェスカ), S.V.D. (June 28, 1926 – 1941)
- Joseph Reiners (ヨゼフ・ライネルス), S.V.D. (19 November 1912 – June 28, 1926)

== See also ==
- Roman Catholicism in Japan
- Our Lady of Akita
