= Paul Daisuke Narui =

Most Reverend Paul Taisuke Narui, S.V.D
- Bishop of Niigata
- Archdiocese: Tokyo
- Diocese: Niigata
- Appointed: 31 May 2020
- Predecessor: Tarcisio Isao Kikuchi
- Successor: Incumbent

Orders
- Ordination: 10 March 2001
- Consecration: 22 September 2020 by Tarcisio Isao Kikuchi

Personal details
- Born: 24 November 1973 (age 52) Iwakura, Japan
- Denomination: Roman Catholic
- Education: Nanzan University
- Coat of arms

Paul Taisuke Narui, S.V.D. is the bishop of the Roman Catholic Diocese of Niigata, Japan.

== Early life ==
Narui was born on 24 November 1973 in Iwakura, Japan.

== Priesthood ==
Narui joined Society of the Divine Word on 1986 and was ordained a priest on 10 March 2001. He obtained a bachelor's degree from Nanzan University.

== Episcopate ==
On 31 May 2020, Pope Francis appointed Narui as bishop of the Roman Catholic Diocese of Niigata, Japan. He was consecrated on 22 September 2020 by Tarcisio Isao Kikuchi.
