= List of private revelations approved by the Catholic Church =

Private revelations approved by the Catholic Church are private revelations which the Catholic Church has judged to be in all probability (not infallibly or with absolute certainty) from God (constat de supernaturalitate), and has legalized to be published and authorized devotion to them. Shrines and feast days, when authorized by the church, are typical signs of approval since they are part of devotion to private revelation. This list is organized according to the episcopal level of approval, type of revelation, and chronology and includes a brief line about the revelation, its recipient, which church official approved of it, and an except from a church document about it being approved.

== Episcopal Approval ==
=== Mary ===
==== Apparition ====
===== Laus, France (1664-1718) =====
The apparitions of Our Lady of Laus to Venerable Benedicta Rencurel were approved by Bishop Jean-Michel de Falco.

I recognize the supernatural origin of the apparitions and the events and words experienced and narrated by Benedicta Rencurel. I encourage all of the faithful to come and pray and seek spiritual renewal at this shrine.

===== Green Bay, Wisconsin (1859) =====
The three apparitions of Our Lady of Champion to Adele Brise were approved by Bishop David Ricken.

It remains to me now, the Twelfth Bishop of the Diocese of Green Bay and the lowliest of the servants of Mary, to declare with moral certainty and in accord with the norms of the Church that the events, apparitions and locutions given to Adele Brise in October of 1859 do exhibit the substance of supernatural character, and I do hereby approve these apparitions as worthy of belief (although not obligatory) by the Christian faithful.

===== Kibeho, Rwanda (1981-1989) =====
The apparitions of Our Lady of Kibeho to Alphonsine Mumureke, Nathalie Mukamazimpaka, and Marie Claire Mukangango were approved by Bishop Augustin Misago.

Yes, the Virgin Mary appeared at Kibeho on November 28th, 1981 and in the months that followed. There are more reasons to believe in the apparitions than to deny them. Only the three initial testimonies merit being considered authentic; they were given by Alphonsine Mumureke, Nathalie Mukamazimpaka, and by Marie Claire Mukangango.

== Papal approved ==
=== Jesus ===
==== Apparition ====
===== Paray, France (1673-1675) =====
The apparitions of the Sacred Heart of Jesus to Saint Margaret Mary Alacoque were approved by Pope Pius XI.

For when Christ manifested Himself to Margaret Mary, and declared to her the infinitude of His love, at the same time, in the manner of a mourner, He complained that so many and such great injuries were done to Him by ungrateful men - and we would that these words in which He made this complaint were fixed in the minds of the faithful, and were never blotted out by oblivion...

===== Krakow, Poland (1931-1938) =====
The apparitions of the Divine Mercy to Saint Faustina Kowalska were approved by Pope John Paul II.

Today, therefore, in this Shine, I wish solemnly to entrust the world to Divine Mercy. I do so with the burning desire that the message of God’s merciful love, proclaimed here through Saint Faustina, may be made known to all the peoples of the earth and fill their hearts with hope.

==== Vision ====
===== Helfta, Thuringia (13th century) =====
The visions of Jesus to Saint Mechtilde of Hackeborn of the convent of Helfta were mentioned by Pope Benedict XVI in a General Audience of September 29, 2010. "However, the Lord reassured her, making her realize that all that had been written was for the glory of God and for the benefit of her neighbour".

===== Eisleben, Thuringia (13th century) =====
The visions of Jesus to Saint Gertrude the Great were referred to by Benedict XVI in a General Audience of October 6, 2010.

On 27 January 1281, a few days before the Feast of the Purification of the Virgin, towards the hour of Compline in the evening, the Lord with his illumination dispelled her deep anxiety. With gentle sweetness he calmed the distress that anguished her, a torment that Gertrude saw even as a gift of God, "to pull down that tower of vanity and curiosity which, although I had both the name and habit of a nun alas I had continued to build with my pride, so that at least in this manner I might find the way for you to show me your salvation" (ibid., II, p. 87). She had a vision of a young man who, in order to guide her through the tangle of thorns that surrounded her soul, took her by the hand. In that hand Gertrude recognized "the precious traces of the wounds that abrogated all the acts of accusation of our enemies" (ibid., II, 1, p. 89), and thus recognized the One who saved us with his Blood on the Cross: Jesus.

=== Mary ===
==== Apparition ====
===== Guadalupe, Mexico (1531) =====
The five apparitions of Our Lady of Guadalupe of Extremadura to Saint Juan Diego were approved by Pope John Paul II.

Dear Brothers in the episcopate and dear sons and daughters, how deep is my joy that the first steps of my pilgrimage, as Successor of Paul VI and John Paul I, bring me precisely here. They bring me to you, Mary, in this shrine of the people of Mexico and of the whole of Latin America, the shrine in which for so many centuries your motherhood has been manifested.

===== Rue du Bac, France (1830) =====
The three apparitions of the Miraculous Medal to Saint Catherine Labouré were approved by Pope Pius XII.

In many ways the nineteenth century was to become, after the turmoil of the Revolution, a century of Marian favors. To mention but a single instance, everyone is familiar today with the "miraculous medal." This medal, with its image of "Mary conceived without sin," was revealed to a humble daughter of Saint Vincent de Paul whom We had the joy of inscribing in the catalogue of Saints, and it has spread its spiritual and material wonders everywhere.

===== Lourdes, France (1858) =====
The eighteen apparitions of Our Lady of Lourdes to Saint Bernadette Soubirous were approved by Pope Pius XII.

A few years later, from February 11 to July 16, 1858, the Blessed Virgin Mary was pleased, as a new favor, to manifest herself in the territory of the Pyrenees to a pious and pure child of a poor, hardworking, Christian family. "She came to Bernadette," We once said. "She made her her confidante, her collaboratrix, the instrument of her maternal tenderness and of the merciful power of her Son, to restore the world in Christ through a new and incomparable outpouring of the Redemption."

===== Fatima, Portugal (1917) =====
The six apparitions of Our Lady of Fatima to Servant of God Lucia Santos and Saints Francisco and Jacinta Marto were approved by Pope John Paul II.

In her motherly concern, the Blessed Virgin came here to Fátima to ask men and women "to stop offending God, Our Lord, who is already very offended". It is a mother's sorrow that compels her to speak; the destiny of her children is at stake. For this reason she asks the little shepherds: "Pray, pray much and make sacrifices for sinners; many souls go to hell because they have no one to pray and make sacrifices for them".

==== Vision ====
===== Knock, Ireland (1879) =====
The vision of Our Lady of Knock to Dominick Byrne, Margaret Byrne, Mary Byrne, Patrick Byrne, Judith Campbell, John Curry, John Durkan, Hugh Flatley, Patrick Hill, Mary McLoughlin, Catherine Murray, Bridget Trench and Patrick Walsh was approved by Pope John Paul II.

Here I am at the goal of my journey to Ireland : the Shrine of Our Lady at Knock. Since I first learnt of the centenary of this Shrine, which is being celebrated this year, I have felt a strong desire to come here, the desire to make yet another pilgrimage to the Shrine of the Mother of Christ, the Mother of the Church, the Queen of Peace.
