= Our Lady of Akita =

1973 Marian apparition in Japan

Coordinates: 39.7596°N 140.1497°E

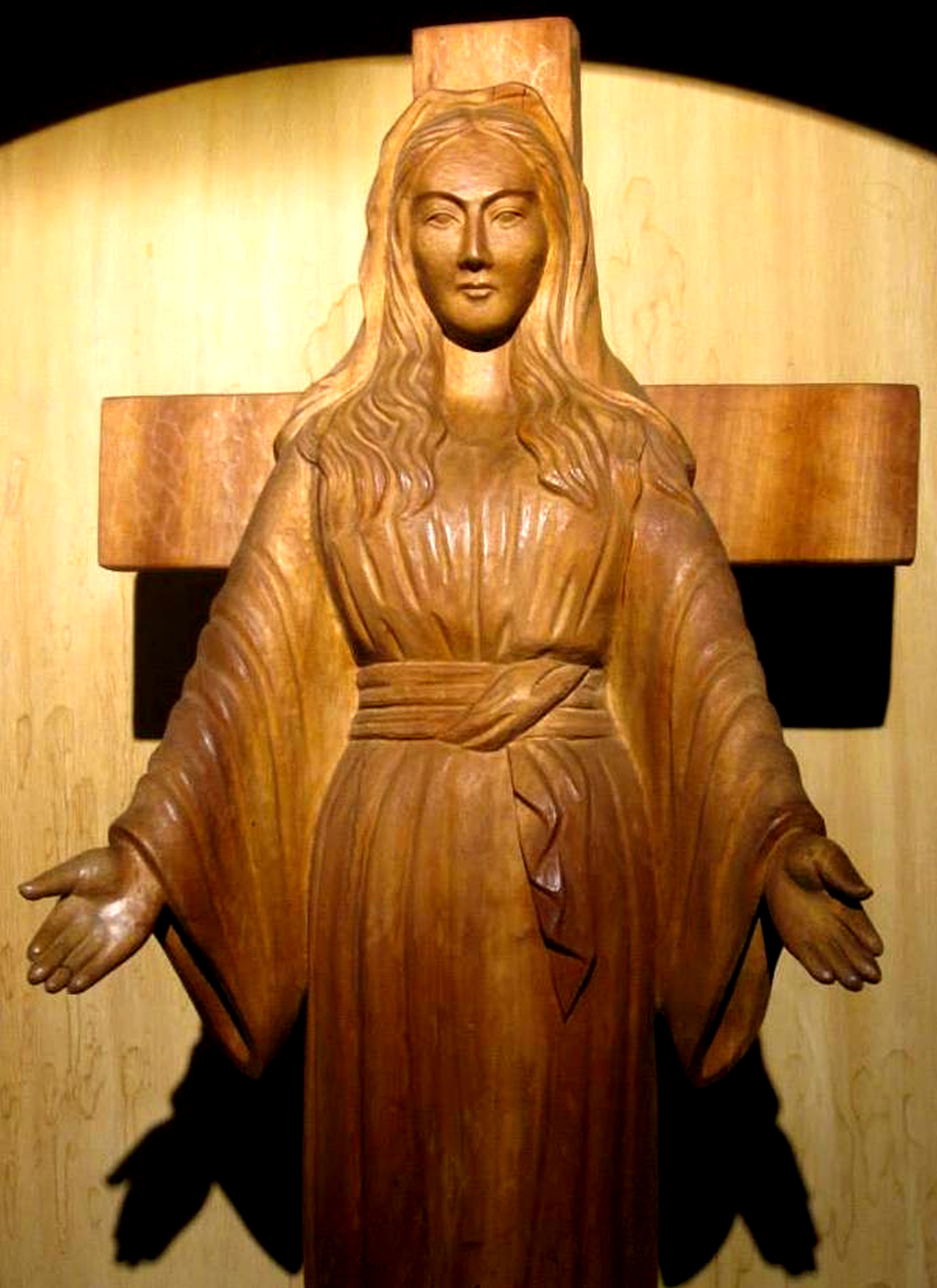
- A carved wood statue at Our Lady of Akita Shrine
- Location: Yuzawadai, Soegawa, Akita City, Akita Prefecture, Japan
- Date: 1973–1979
- Witness: Agnes Katsuko Sasagawa
- Type: Marian apparition
- Approval: April 22, 1984; Bishop John Shojiro Ito; Diocese of Niigata
- Shrine: Our Lady of Akita Shrine Redemptoris Mater at the convent of the Seitai Hoshikai Handmaids of the Holy Eucharist at Yuzawadai

Our Lady of Akita (Japanese: 秋田の聖母マリア) is a title of the Blessed Virgin Mary associated with the Marian apparitions reported in 1973 by Sister Agnes Katsuko Sasagawa in the remote area of Yuzawadai, an outskirt of Akita, Japan. The messages emphasize prayer (especially recitation of the Holy Rosary) and penance in combination with cryptic prophecies warning of sacerdotal persecution and heresy within the Catholic Church. A wooden statue representing the apparitions is venerated by the Japanese faithful and other Catholics. In December 1973, a Japanese television station videotaped tears coming from the statue's eyes.

The apparitions were unusual in that the weeping statue of the Virgin Mary was broadcast on Japanese national television, and gained further notice with the sudden healing of hearing impairments experienced by Sasagawa after the apparitions. The image also became affiliated with The Lady of All Nations movement, with which the message shares some similarities.

The local ordinary of the convent, John Shojiro Ito, Bishop of Niigata (r. 1962–1985), recognized "the supernatural character of a series of mysterious events concerning the statue of the Holy Mother Mary" and authorized "the veneration of the Holy Mother of Akita" within the Roman Catholic Diocese of Niigata in a 1984 pastoral letter.

== Background ==
Sasagawa, originally from a Buddhist family, had encountered many health problems for most of her life. She was born premature and, following a bad appendix operation, was immobile for over a decade. Her health reportedly improved after drinking water from Lourdes while under the care of a Catholic nun. After going completely deaf, she went to live with nuns near Akita. Sasagawa died on August 15, 2024, at the age of 93, in Akita, Japan, at the convent where she lived.

== Apparitions ==
In 1973, Sasagawa reported apparitions, as well as manifesting the stigmata and a wooden statue of the Virgin Mary which she claimed to have wept on 101 occasions. The nuns at Yuzawadai also reported stigmata on the statue that supposedly appeared before the tears started, and disappeared after the tears.

Sasagawa said she received three messages from the Virgin Mary in 1973, while the statue itself is reported to have continued weeping thereafter.

=== Messages ===
Sasagawa claimed to have received the first message on July 6, 1973. She said the Virgin's statue became illuminated as it acknowledged her stigmata and hearing impairment. She was then instructed to recite the Prayer of the Handmaids of the Eucharist, which the Virgin Mary said would cure her deafness. The other reported messages ask for more praying of the Rosary and Acts of Reparation.

The second message includes the following: "Many men in this world afflict the Lord. I desire souls to console Him to soften the anger of the Heavenly Father. I wish, with my Son, for souls who will repair by their suffering and their poverty for the sinners and ingrates."

The third message was communicated on October 13, 1973. It was also claimed that the statue became animate for an extended period, a phenomenon several nuns claimed to have witnessed. The content of the third message is:

My dear daughter, listen well to what I have to say to you. You will inform your superior... As I told you, if men do not repent and better themselves, the Father will inflict a terrible punishment on all humanity. It will be a punishment greater than the flood, such as one will never have seen before. Fire will fall from the sky and will wipe out a great part of humanity, the good as well as the bad, sparing neither priests nor faithful. The survivors will find themselves so desolate that they will envy the dead. The only arms which will remain for you will be the Rosary and the Sign left by My Son. Each day recite the prayers of the Rosary. With the Rosary, pray for the Pope, the bishops and priests. The work of the devil will infiltrate even into the Church in such a way that one will see cardinals opposing cardinals, bishops against bishops. The priests who venerate me will be scorned and opposed by their confreres...churches and altars sacked; the Church will be full of those who accept compromises and the demon will press many priests and consecrated souls to leave the service of the Lord. The demon will be especially implacable against souls consecrated to God. The thought of the loss of so many souls is the cause of my sadness. If sins increase in number and gravity, there will be no longer pardon for them. With courage, speak to your superior. He will know how to encourage each one of you to pray and to accomplish works of reparation... It is Bishop Ito, who directs your community. You have still something to ask? Today is the last time that I will speak to you in living voice. From now on you will obey the one sent to you and your superior. Pray very much the prayers of the Rosary. I alone am able still to save you from the calamities which approach. Those who place their confidence in me will be saved.

=== Medical cures ===
Sasagawa was admitted to the community of the Sisters of Junshin in Nagasaki. She experienced hearing loss in her left ear years earlier; (Note: Years prior to 1973, Sasagawa was Sawada's patient when she experienced hearing loss in her left ear.) she experienced hearing loss in her right ear for first time in March 1973 at Myōkō, Niigata.

Sasagawa moved into the convent of the Seitai Hoshikai Handmaids of the Holy Eucharist at Yuzawadai on 12 May 1973. The three messages from the statue were "perceived by the deaf ears of" Sasagawa while she was a novice at the convent.

In October 1974, Sasagawa experienced a sudden improvement in hearing. In March 1975, Sasagawa began to "experience violent headaches" and hearing loss. The diagnoses of two hearing examinations in March 1975 was hearing loss in both ears. (Note: Sasagawa was examined in March 1975 at Akita City Hospital and at Akita Red Cross Hospital. Yasuda & Haffert (1994, pp. 144–145) did not include what type of hearing loss was diagnosed or which part of the auditory system was damaged.) Dr. Sawada of the Niigata Rosai Hospital in Jōetsu verified that she was 'incurably deaf' and issued documents for her to receive a state subsidy. (Note: Rosai hospitals provide government medical workers' compensation services that "include the prevention and treatment of work-related injuries and illnesses, and support for patients returning to work after an injury or illness.") Dr. Arai of the Eye and Ear Division of the Akita Red Cross Hospital also verified her complete deafness.

In May 1982, Sasagawa again experienced a sudden improvement in hearing. In June 1982, Sawada attested that Sasagawa's hearing was fully restored. According to Yasuda, the hearing improvement noticed during Sasagawa's 1982 hearing examination was not certified as a "miraculous cure" by the hospital.

On August 4, 1981, a Korean woman named Teresa Chun Sun Ho had a terminal brain tumor allegedly cured after friends and relatives prayed for the intercession of Our Lady of Akita. Her disease was diagnosed, and the subsequent cure verified by medical professionals in South Korea. Yasuda wrote that according to Chun and other October 1983 Korean pilgrims, the cure "had been declared miraculous by Church authorities of Korea".

== Stigmata ==
Sasagawa "claimed to have had a stigmatic-like experience". (Note: Murguia 2016a, p. 290.) Her left hand developed bleeding marks. Yasuda wrote that in June 1973 "in the center of [Sasagawa's] palm were two red scratches in the form of a cross" which seemed to have "been engraved in the skin" and began to bleed a few days later. "There were two red traces in the form of a cross and they seemed to cause [Sasagawa] pain", according to one nun. According to Sasagawa's account, the stigmata emerged after she began seeing supernatural beings, which appeared to be angels, and two incidents where she felt piercing pain in the palm of her hand. When the wound appeared in her hand, there were several explanations proposed, including the theory of ectoplasmic capability, although theologians said that the stigmata on Sasagawa and the statue's hands were meant as signs.

== Weeping statue ==
Nuns claimed the palm of the statue's right hand oozed a liquid from two, short intersecting lines. It was described as "a blackish mark," by one nun; "one would have said that it had been traced with a fine point of a pencil." According to a second nun, "On these lines there stood out two darker points. It resembled very much ink which had spread under the effect of heat. I said to myself that the Novice Mistress must have spoken of these points when she saw blood flow through a hole as large as that of a needle." A third nun, who had been the sacristan, described that she "saw in the middle of the palm of the right hand that a wound in the form of a cross had been cut with something like the tip of a blade."

TV Tokyo Channel 12 videotaped the weeping statue in December 1978. The blood type of the statue and its sweat and tear type were found to be types B and AB, respectively.

== Investigation ==
In 1975, Bishop Ito began initial consultation with the Congregation for the Doctrine of the Faith (CDF). (Note: Murguia 2016a, p. 291.) Having been advised that preliminary jurisdiction resides with the local ordinary, the following year he convened an inquiry commission which arrived at the conclusion that it is "not in a position to prove the supernatural events".

In light of new CDF norms for examining "presumed apparitions or revelations", which had been published the previous year, (Note: Official modern language translations of the 1978 CDF norms were published in 2012.) Bishop Ito requested a CDF intervention to create another inquiry commission. In 1981, the CDF, being "unfavorable to the events", responded that it will not initiate a new examination.

In 1982, Bishop Ito, stating that the 1981 CDF response "contained some misunderstandings", sent a "complete dossier, augmented with the new facts" to the CDF. and met with CDF officials in 1983 while the case remained under examination.

On April 22, 1984, Bishop Ito, noting that the case had been under examination for eight years, issued a statement that he did not find in the events "any elements which are contrary to Catholic faith and morals". He recognized "the supernatural character of a series of mysterious events concerning the statue" in the convent, and authorized "the veneration of the Holy Mother of Akita" within the Roman Catholic Diocese of Niigata ("while awaiting [a] definitive judgment on this matter" pronounced by the Holy See). He further clarified that the events were a private revelation and not necessary for salvation like public revelation.

In June 1988, a now-retired Ito met with Cardinal Ratzinger, then head of the CDF. Ratzinger gave his verbal approval to Ito's 1984 letter, while not rendering "judgment about the credibility of the events". (Note: Murguia 2016a, p. 292; Murguia 2016b, p. 427.)

In 1990, Peter Shirayanagi, Archbishop of Tokyo and President of the Catholic Bishops' Conference of Japan, told the Italian periodical 30 Giorni that "the events of Akita are no longer to be taken seriously."

The Holy See, meanwhile, never gave definitive judgment on the matter, either positive or negative. Because Bishop Ito's declaration of approval has not been reversed by his successors or by the Holy See, the apparition remains officially approved for the Diocese of Niigata according to Canon law.

== New message ==
On October 27, 2019, WQPH 98.3 FM, a Catholic radio station broadcasting in the U.S. state of Massachusetts, broke the news that Sasagawa had received a new message. On October 6, 2019, Sasagawa was awakened by her guardian angel and told, "Cover yourself in ashes, and please pray a rosary of reparation every day. Become like a child. Please offer sacrifices every day."

== See also ==
- Atom-bombed Mary
- History of Roman Catholicism in Japan

== Sources ==
- Congregation for the Doctrine of the Faith (1978-02-25). "Norms regarding the manner of proceeding in the discernment of presumed apparitions or revelations". vatican.va. Archived from the original on 2020-02-20.
- Craughwell, Thomas J. (2011-03-23). "Is Japan's Our Lady of Akita apparition 'worthy of belief'? Vision has been in news because of calamities, but its approval is questioned". OSV Newsweekly. Vol. 99, no. 49. Huntington, IN: Our Sunday Visitor (published 2011-04-03). p. 8. ISSN 0030-6967. Archived from the original on 2018-05-29.
- "Shrines in Japan". International Marian Research Institute. University of Dayton. Archived from the original on 2016-12-07.
- "The apparitions of the Blessed Virgin Mary in Akita, Japan, to Sr. Agnes Sasagawa". ewtn.com. Irondale, AL: Eternal Word Television Network. November 2011. Archived from the original on 2011-12-08.
- English abstract of Fujii, Hirohisa (2008). "Transition of Rosai hospitals and their pharmaceutical departments" 労災病院と薬剤部の変遷 [Transition of Rosai hospitals and their pharmaceutical departments]. The Japanese Journal for History of Pharmacy (in Japanese). 43 (1). Tokyo: 84–90. ISSN 0285-2314. PMID 19227661.
- Glatz, Carol (2012-05-24). "Vatican publishes rules for verifying visions of Mary". ncronline.org. Kansas City, MO: National Catholic Reporter. Catholic News Service. Archived from the original on 2016-06-02.
- Hayes, Patrick J., ed. (2016). Miracles: an encyclopedia of people, places, and supernatural events from antiquity to the present. Santa Barbara: ABC-CLIO. ISBN 9781610695985.
  - Murguia, Salvador. "Our Lady of Akita". In Hayes (2016), pp. 290–292.
  - Murguia, Salvador. "Weeping". In Hayes (2016), pp. 426–427.
- Ruggles, Robin (2000). Apparition shrines: places of pilgrimage and prayer. Boston: Paulist Press. ISBN 9780819847997.
- Ito, John Shojiro (1984-04-22). Duricy, Michael P. (ed.). "Akita apparition letter". campus.udayton.edu. Dayton, Ohio: The Marian Library/International Marian Research Institute (published 2011-04-05). Archived from the original on 2011-08-13.
- Yasuda, Teiji (1994) [©1989]. Akita: The tears and message of Mary (PDF). Translated by Haffert, John M. (4th printing of 1989 ed.). Asbury, New Jersey: 101 Foundation. OCLC 40707680. Archived from the original (PDF) on 2016-05-14.
- "Cardinal Ratzinger said to approve messages of Blessed Mother at Akita". ucanews.com. Hong Kong: Union of Catholic Asian News. 1988-08-17. Archived from the original on 2016-05-14.
