= Guardian Angels Church =

Guardian Angels Church may refer to:

== United States ==
- Holy Guardian Angels Church and Cemetery Historic District, listed on the National Register of Historic Places in Carroll County, Iowa, US
- Guardian Angels Church (Manistee, Michigan), a church on the National Register of Historic Places in Michigan
- Guardian Angels Church (Chaska, Minnesota), a historic church in Minnesota
- Guardian Angel Cathedral, a Roman Catholic cathedral in Las Vegas, Nevada, U.S.
- Church of the Guardian Angel (Manhattan), a historic church in New York City
- Church of the Guardian Angel, in Wallis Texas

== Elsewhere ==
- Guardian Angel Cathedral, Santo Ângelo, Brazil
- Holy Guardian Angels Church, a National Monument in Santiago, Chile
- The Guardian Angels Church, Mile End, a historic church in London, England
- Guardian Angels Cathedral, Sapporo, a cathedral in Sapporo, Japan
