= Stephen Fumio Hamao =

Japanese Cardinal of the Catholic Church (1930–2007)

His Eminence Stephen Fumio Hamao
- President Emeritus of the Pontifical Council for the Pastoral Care of Migrants and Itinerant People
- Church: Catholic Church
- Appointed: 15 June 1998
- Term ended: 11 March 2006
- Predecessor: Giovanni Cheli
- Successor: Renato Raffaele Martino
- Other post: Cardinal-Deacon of San Giovanni Bosco in Via Tuscolana (2003-07)
- Previous posts: Titular Bishop of Oreto (1970-79); Auxiliary Bishop of Tokyo (1970-79); Bishop of Yokohama (1979-98); President of the Japanese Episcopal Conference (1995-98)

Orders
- Ordination: 21 December 1957 by Pietro Sigismondi
- Consecration: 29 April 1970 by Bruno Wüstenberg
- Created cardinal: 21 October 2003 by Pope John Paul II
- Rank: Cardinal-Deacon

Personal details
- Born: Stephen Fumio Hamao; 9 March 1930 Tokyo, Japan
- Died: 9 November 2007 (aged 77) Tokyo, Japan
- Education: Hitotsubashi University; Pontifical Urban University
- Motto: Adveniat regnum Tuum

Styles of Stephen Hamao
- Reference style: His Eminence
- Spoken style: Your Eminence
- Informal style: Cardinal
- See: Yokohama (emeritus)

Stephen Fumio Hamao (濱尾 文郎 Hamao Fumio) (9 March 1930 – 8 November 2007) was a Japanese cardinal of the Catholic Church and was the president of the Pontifical Council for the Pastoral Care of Migrants and Itinerants until it merged with other elements of the Roman Curia. He was made a cardinal by Pope John Paul II in 2003.

== Biography ==
Hamao was born in Tokyo, the third son of the Viscount Shirō Hamao (1896–1935), who was an adopted son of the Viscount Hamao Arata, the 8th President of University of Tokyo and the 11th Minister of Education. His family home housed both Shinto and Buddhist shrines, but his widowed mother converted to Catholicism in 1942, and he and his brother Minoru were baptised in 1946. He studied at Hitotsubashi University and then joined a seminary. After further study at the Pontifical Urbaniana University in Rome, he was ordained as a priest on 21 December 1957.

After his ordination, he returned to Tokyo, where he served as secretary to the cardinal archbishop, secretary of the archdiocesan liturgical commission and, finally, parish priest of the cathedral.

Hamao was on the hijacked Japan Airlines Flight 351 as a passenger in 1970. He was appointed titular bishop of Oreto and auxiliary bishop of Tokyo on 5 February 1970, and was consecrated on 29 April 1970. He was named Bishop of Yokohama on 30 October 1979, a post he held for almost 20 years until he resigned on 15 June 1998 to become President of the Pontifical Council for the Pastoral Care of Migrants and Itinerants. He was made an Archbishop at the same time. He was also head of the regional branch of the charity Caritas, and became president of the Japanese Episcopal Conference in 1995.

He was elevated to the College of Cardinals on 21 October 2003 by Pope John Paul II, holding the title of Cardinal Deacon of St. John Bosco in Via Tuscolana. The same year, he had called for a Third Vatican Council to deal with the question of local church authority.

He was one of the cardinal electors in the 2005 papal conclave that selected Pope Benedict XVI. He resigned from the Pontifical Council in March 2006, a month after the Congregation for the Causes of Saints approved the beatification of 188 Japanese martyrs from the 17th century.

His late brother Minoru served Crown Prince Akihito as East Palace Chamberlain (tōgūjijū, 東宮侍従). Cardinal Hamao instructed Akihito in Latin, but he criticised a perceived "excessively Westernised" bias and "over-intellectualised" theology in the Catholic Church. Shortly after he urged Pope Benedict XVI to appoint more Asians to positions of power in the Roman Curia, Cardinal Ivan Dias became prefect of the Congregation for the Evangelization of Peoples.

Cardinal Hamao died at age 77 of lung cancer on 8 November 2007.

== See also ==
- Roppa Furukawa - Uncle
