= Mario Michiaki Yamanouchi =

Japanese Roman Catholic bishop

Mario Michiaki Yamanouchi S.D.B.
- Church: Catholic Church
- Diocese: Saitama
- Appointed: 2 June 2018
- Installed: 24 September 2018
- Predecessor: Marcellino Taiji Tani
- Previous post: Provincial of the Salesians in Japan (2014–2018)

Orders
- Ordination: 21 December 1984
- Consecration: 24 September 2018 by Tarcisio Isao Kikuchi

Personal details
- Born: Michiaki Yamanouchi; 8 December 1955 (age 70) Ōita, Japan
- Motto: Unum Corpus in Christo
- Coat of arms

Mario Michiaki Yamanouchi S.D.B. (born 8 December 1955) is a Japanese Roman Catholic prelate who has served as the bishop of the Diocese of Saitama since 2018. A member of the Salesians of Don Bosco, he previously served as provincial of the Salesian Society of Saint John Bosco in Japan.

== Biography ==
=== Early life and formation ===
Yamanouchi was born on 8 December 1955 in Ōita, Japan. He entered the Salesian novitiate in Argentina in 1975. From 1976 to 1979, he studied philosophy and theology in Córdoba, Argentina. He made his perpetual profession on 24 January 1982 and obtained bachelor's degrees in theology and educational sciences.

=== Priesthood ===
Yamanouchi was ordained a priest on 21 December 1984 in San Juan, Argentina. He subsequently held several positions in Salesian institutions in Argentina, including catechetical appointments, service as a novice master in La Plata, and leadership of a Salesian house in Buenos Aires. He also served as a provincial councillor.

He returned to Japan on 26 February 1997. After studying Japanese at the Salesian Study Center in Ōita, he held various educational and pastoral positions, including service at a Salesian vocational school, leadership of a religious community in Suginami, and the rectorship of the Salesian theological school in Chōfu. He also served as spiritual director of the Mary Help of Christians Association.

Yamanouchi held several leadership positions within the Salesian province in Japan. These included serving as vice-provincial and provincial house rector. In 2014, he became provincial of the Salesian Society of Saint John Bosco in Japan, a position he held until his appointment as bishop of Saitama in 2018.

=== Episcopacy ===
On 2 June 2018, Pope Francis appointed Yamanouchi bishop of the Diocese of Saitama, Japan. The appointment ended a period during which the diocese had been without a diocesan bishop following the resignation of Marcellino Taiji Tani in 2013.

Yamanouchi was consecrated a bishop on 24 September 2018. He became the seventh ordinary to lead the Saitama diocese and the fifth bishop since the ecclesiastical territory was elevated to diocesan status.

Catholic Church titles
Preceded by Marcellino Taiji Tani	Bishop of Saitama; 2018–present	Succeeded by Incumbent
