= Diocese of Sapporo =

Latin Catholic diocese in Japan

Coordinates: 43°3′52.58″N 141°21′55.55″E

Diocese of Sapporo Dioecesis Sapporensis カトリック札幌司教区
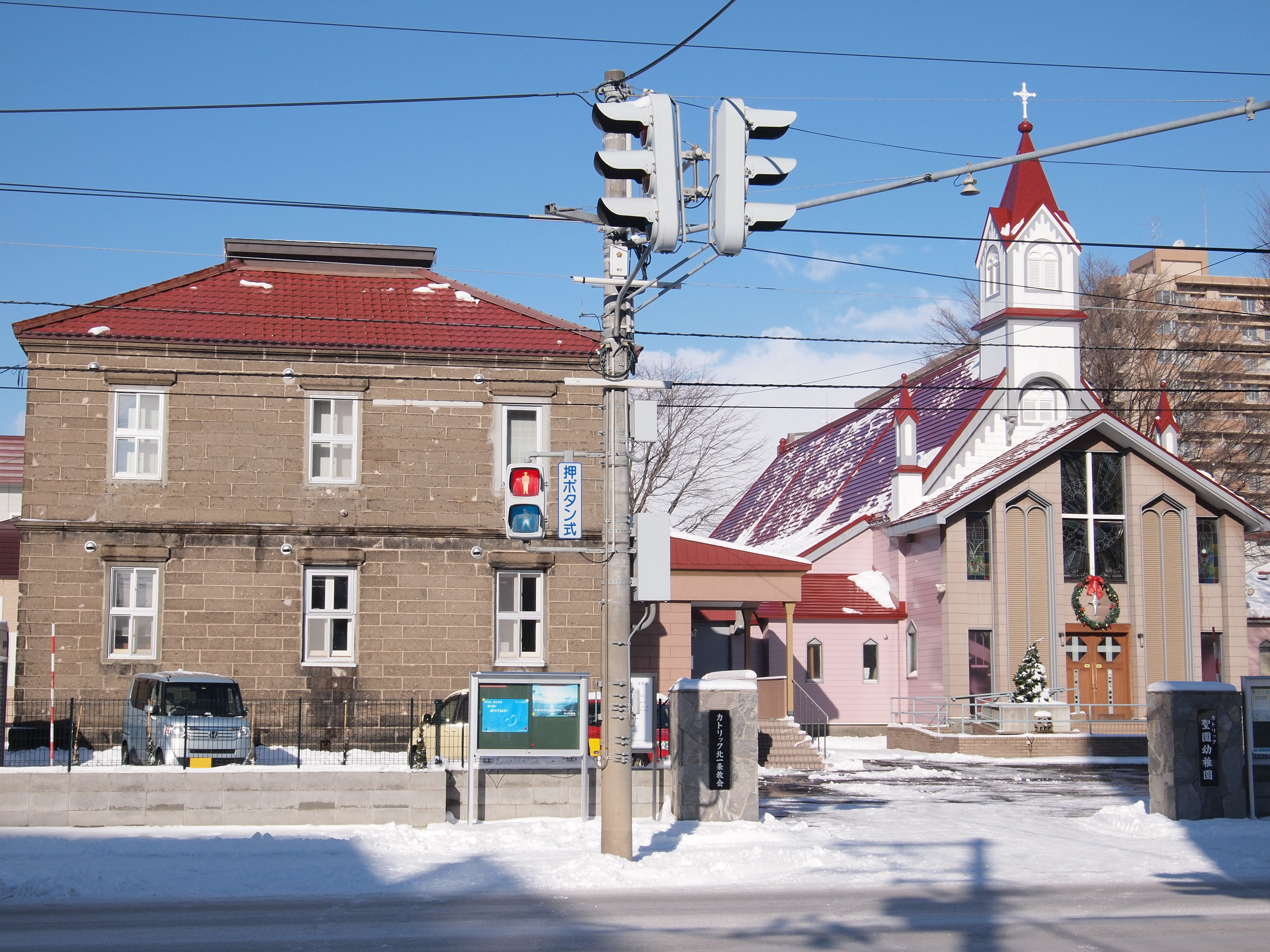
- Sapporo Cathedral

Location
- Country: Japan
- Territory: Hokkaido
- Ecclesiastical province: Tokyo
- Metropolitan: Tokyo

Statistics
- Area: 83,452 km^{2} (32,221 sq mi)
- Population: Total; Catholics: (as of 2010); 5,543,556; 17,993 (0.3%)

Information
- Rite: Latin Rite
- Cathedral: Guardian Angels Cathedral

Current leadership
- Pope: Leo XIV
- Bishop: Bernard Taiji Katsuya
- Metropolitan Archbishop: Tarcisio Isao Kikuchi

Map
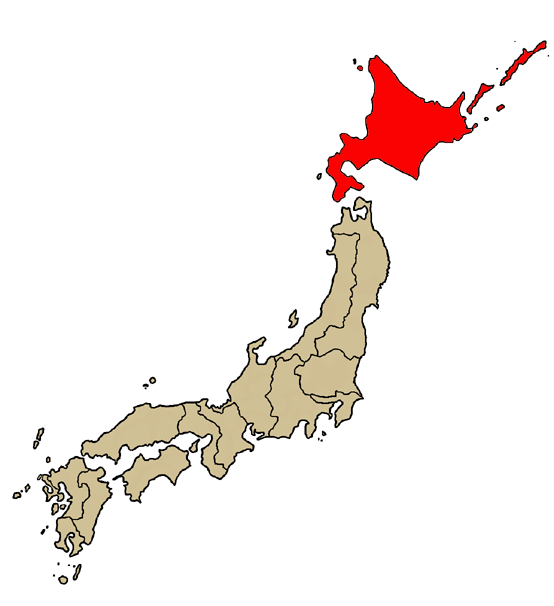

Website
- http://www.csd.or.jp/

The Diocese of Sapporo (Latin: Dioecesis Sapporensis) is a Latin Catholic diocese of the Catholic Church located in Sapporo, Japan.

The diocese was formerly established as the Apostolic Prefecture of Sapporo on February 12, 1915. It was later lifted to the title of Apostolic Vicariate of Sapporo on March 30, 1929. 23 years later, it was lifted to its current state, the Diocese of Sapporo, on December 11, 1952. This diocese under the Archdiocese of Tokyo, which is the metropolitan territory governing the Diocese of Sapporo and other diocesan territories, led by its archbishop, Tarcisio Isao Kikuchi.

The diocesan seat of the bishop of Sapporo is the Guardian Angels Cathedral. The current bishop is Bernard Taiji Katsuya.

== History ==
=== Foundations ===
Christianity was established by Jesuit Missionaries, led by St. Francis Xavier who was a Jesuit Himself. The establishment of Christianity by St Francis Xavier happened six years after the discovery of Japan by Portuguese Sailors in 1549.

In its earliest stages, approximately 250 years after its foundation in 1549, Christianity and its members faced violent persecutions and torture due to the forbidding of Gospel preaching in the country. Christianity in Japan, in general, was initially founded by Assyrian Missionaries, however, it was St Francis Xavier who established Christianity and had managed to preach the Gospel through the assistance of a Japanese interpreter, which allowed for the rapid spread of Christianity first at the southern region and later reaching the pinnacle of its northern territory. In around 1580, the Christian convert population had surpassed 200,000 members, although facing much persecution paired with the rejection of foreign missionaries, priests and bishops as ordered by the ruling shogun Toyotomi Hideyoshi.

=== Persecution ===
The persecution period for Christians involved capturing, torturing, and when they remained persistent about being Christians, were killed. Many Christians decided to hide their faith by disguising as members of Buddhism or Shintoism which were accepted religions in Japan, while practicing Christianity undercover. They were known as hidden Christians, or kakure. The kakure developed a system to maintain their liturgical calendar, preach to people outside the faith and conduct liturgies such as baptism and funerals. However, this had to be done without priests or any clergy in general for multiple generations. In fact, some Christians did not even join the Catholic Church when the faith was finally permitted due to the traditions which had been passed on and developed. This did not stop the Jesuit Mission in Japan, where eventually there was a group of Jesuits sent from the Vatican with the aim of further evangelising to the people.

The plight of Christians eventually caught media attention in many major western countries. The Japanese government remained firm on the fact that the treatment of Christians should be dealt with internally without the interference of the western countries. However, the media coverage portrayed japan as an uncivilised country due to the treatment of Christians and led to slow reformation. The persecution of Christians in Japan had completely come to a halt when a "freedom of religion" clause was established in 1889.

=== Christianity and the Second World War ===
Japanese religion, in general, had entered a new phase after the commencement of WW2. US-allied forces had dismantled the state Shinto which led to the separation of state and religion through a new constitution in 1947. This involved freedom of religion which gave rise to new religious movements. However, this also included a rise in Christian converts during this period.

The war was detrimental to the Archdiocese of Tokyo which contained the Vicariate of Sapporo. Throughout the war, fourteen out of twenty-one churches were destroyed within the Archdiocese of Tokyo. However, with the help of missionaries who had to leave China after the war, there was a significant expansion in the archdiocese, with 66 churches in total by 1963.

=== Formation of Diocese of Sapporo ===
Christianity in Japan started exceedingly progressing throughout the 20th century with its ministries: establishing dioceses, consecrating bishops, forming Catholic schools and involving women in the ministries as sisters.

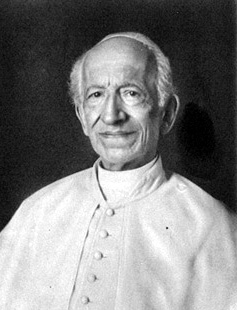
Pope Leo XIII lifted the Vicariate of Sapporo to the Diocese of Sapporo.

The formation of the Diocese of Sapporo initially took place in 1915 as a prefecture which was separated from the Hakodate diocese in Hokkaido. On 30 March 1929, Msgr. Kinold was ordained a Bishop Vicar as the prefecture and was later lifted to the Vicariate of Sapporo, which is a territory for which a vicar is responsible.

In 1932, Bishop Kinold resigned from the position of Apostolic Vicariate of Sapporo, and was replaced by Msgr. Tatewaki Toda as the Apostolic administrator until 1944 where he was moved to the Diocese of Yokohama and was replaced by Msgr. Isamu Seno as the apostolic administrator.

Then, on December 11, 1952, the Hakodate district which Sapporo was initially separated from was merged with Sapporo and this region was lifted to the Diocese of Sapporo under the governing of the Archdiocese of Tokyo by Pope Leo XIII. The bishop that was consecrated and placed as the diocesan bishop was Fr. Takahiko Tomizawa who was consecrated in 1953.

=== Current state ===
The Catholic Church in Sapporo currently holds 0.3% of the population of Sapporo as Catholic Christians. However, Japanese members are on a decline not only within the diocese but within the entire Catholic Church in Japan. Regardless, the diocese still maintains its liturgy as part of the Roman rite and offers services in both Japanese and English.

== Cathedral ==
The Cathedral of Guardian Angels, better known as the Guardian Angels Cathedral, is the main cathedral of the Diocese of Sapporo and the official seat of the Catholic Bishop of Sapporo, Bernard Taiji Katsuya.

The cathedral runs in accordance with the Roman rite of the Catholic Church and offers services in both the Japanese language and the English language. The church was lifted to its current status as the seat of the bishop of Sapporo by Pope Leo XIII.

Before the church was established, Fr. Mermet Cachon arrived from Paris, France in 1859 to live in Hakodate. Fr. Mermet started a missionary for the first time in 200 years in Hakodate, and from there a priest by the name of Fr. Urbain Faurie arrived in Sapporo in 1881. Fr. Urbain performed the first Mass in Sapporo and continued to perform Mass in a rented house with a temporary altar, and was the first parish priest of the Guardian angels church.

In 1898, an altar was built out of Sapporo pumice tuff, which is presently at the parish hall and the priest's house. The present altar with three aisles was dedicated under the name of Guardian angels in October 1916. In 1952, at the same time the apostolic prefecture of Sapporo was raised from vicariate to diocese, the church became a cathedral and was identified as the main church in the diocese of Sapporo and the seat of the bishop. Over the period of its establishment until the present day, there have been 15 parish priests, including many from the Society of Foreign Missions of Paris, and the order of Friars Minor.

== Bishops ==
The first diocesan bishop for Sapporo was Benedict Takahiko Tomizawa, initially known as Fr. Takahiko Tomizawa and after his consecration was known as Bishop Benedict Takahiko Tomizawa. The Bishop was consecrated in 1953 although his term as bishop was from 1952, when the diocese was first established until October 1987, when he was succeeded and died over a year later in 1989. Bishop Benedict Takahiko Tomizawa was a significant figure in the Catholic Church as he was involved in the Second Vatican Council of the Church, a global council covering many different topics including doctrinal reviews, Bishop ordinations and many others.

Bishop Benedict was succeeded by Bishop Peter Toshio Jinushi on October 3, 1987, on the same day Bishop Benedict stepped down as Bishop of Sapporo. Bishop Peter's term lasted until November 17, 2009, when he retired and is now the bishop emeritus of Sapporo. Bishop Peter surpassed the accepted retirement age of any bishop within the Catholic Church in September 2005 at the age of 75 years. However, Pope Benedict XVI extended his tenure by more than four years and finally accepted his resignation in 2009. Since his resignation, he has remained the senior bishop of the Diocese of Sapporo.

The diocese was under the administration of Bishop Tarcisio Isao Kikuchi, Bishop of the Diocese of Niigata from November 17, 2009, after the retirement of Bishop Peter. His term lasted until 2013, when he was succeeded by Bishop Bernard Taiji Katsuya. Bishop Tarcisio was only in administration due to the absence of an official diocesan bishop for Sapporo. Bishop Tarcisio was promoted to archbishop of the Archdiocese of Tokyo in 2017. Tarcisio serves as a member of the Representative Council of Caritas Internationalis and also serves as the president for both Caritas Japan and Caritas Asia. Bishop Tarcisio has also been a member of the Congregation for the Evangelization of Peoples since 2014.

The current bishop is Bernard Taiji Katsuya, who was consecrated bishop on October 14, 2013, and his term as bishop of Sapporo began in June 2013. Katsuya is also the chair of the Japan Catholic Council for Justice and Peace.

== Other information ==
Continent	Rite	Type of territory	Area of territory	Population of diocese	Ecclesiastical province	Parishes	Clergy
South and East Asia	Roman (Latin)	Diocese	83452 km^{2}	16,091 Catholics (0.3% of 5,339,980 total) (As of 2017)	Archdiocese of Tokyo	57 (with seat of Bishop at Guardian angel Cathedral)	54 priests (19 diocesan, 35 religious), 1 deacon, 337 lay religious (63 brothers, 274 sisters), 2 seminarians (as of 2017)

The status of the diocese is shown here:

- 1915.02.12: Established as Apostolic Prefecture of Sapporo/Sapporen (Latin)
- 1929.03.30: Promoted as Apostolic Vicariate of Sapporo/Sapporen (Latin)
- 1932.07.18: Lost territory to establish Mission sui juris of Karafuto
- 1952.12.11: Promoted as Diocese of Sapporo

The diocese's Papal Visits are shown here:

- 2019.11.23 – 2019.11.26: Apostolic Journey to Japan
- 1981.02.23 – 1981.02.26: Apostolic Journey to Japan

The Diocese's Special Churches are shown here:

- Cathedral: Cathedral of Guardian Angels 札幌 (Sapporo)
- Former Cathedral: Church of Our Lady of the Immaculate Conception (Motomachi Church), 函館 (Hakodate).
- Shrines in the Extraordinary Jubilee of Mercy

== See also ==
- Roman Catholicism in Japan

== Sources ==
- GCatholic.org ^{[self-published]}
- Catholic Hierarchy ^{[self-published]}
