= St. Mary's Cathedral, Tokyo =

Seat of the Roman Catholic Archdiocese of Tokyo

Coordinates: 35°42′51″N 139°43′36″E

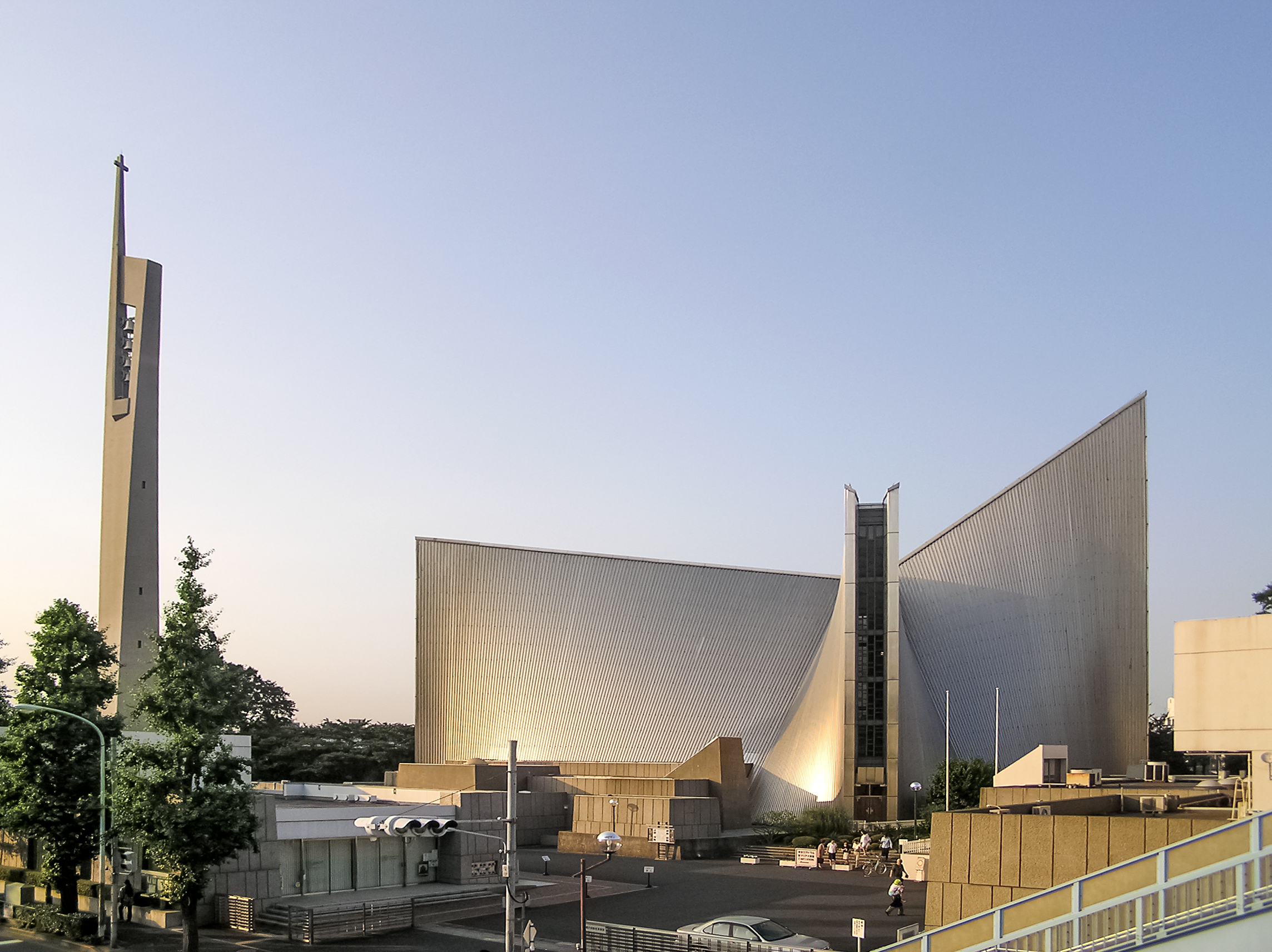
- Interactive map of the St. Mary's Cathedral, Tokyo area

General information
- Location: 3-15-16 Sekiguchi, Bunkyo-ku, Tokyo, Japan
- Completed: 1964
- Renovated: 2007
- Owner: Archdiocese of Tokyo

Height
- Height: Cathedral: 39.4 m (129 ft); Tower: 61.6 m (202 ft)

Technical details
- Floor area: 3,650 m^{2} (39,300 sq ft)
- Grounds: 15,098 m^{2} (162,510 sq ft)

Design and construction
- Architect: Kenzo Tange
- Structural engineer: Yoshikatsu Tsuboi

St. Mary's Cathedral (in Japanese: 東京カテドラル聖マリア大聖堂, romanized: Tōkyō katedoraru sei Maria daiseidō) is the seat of the Roman Catholic Archdiocese of Tokyo. It is located in the Sekiguchi neighborhood of Bunkyo, Tokyo, Japan.

== History ==
The first cathedral of Tokyo was a wooden structure, built in 1899 in the Gothic style, on the behalf of French missionary interests. It survived the Great Kantō Earthquake of 1923, but was destroyed during the air raids on Tokyo during World War II. The Catholics of Tokyo gathered in the ruins of the cathedral before, in 1947, its functions were moved to a Quonset hut, before being moved to the first floor of an adjacent Catholic school building. Due to space limitations in the school building, St. Ignatius Church, Tokyo was used for diocesan services upon its completion in 1949. Additionally, the Church of Francis Xavier, which survived the war, was used as a pro-cathedral from 1953 to 1964.

To celebrate the 100th anniversary of the reintroduction of Catholicism to Japan, in 1960, the Archdiocese of Tokyo, with the support of the Archdiocese of Cologne, held a competition for the rebuilding of St. Mary's, with a 1962 deadline. The finalists in the competition were Yoshirō Taniguchi, Kunio Maekawa, and the eventual winner, Kenzō Tange. Tange's entry was the only cruciform one, and distinguished itself with the use of a thin-shell structure. Its design also incorporated visibly Japanese elements, such as an entrance via a Lourdes grotto, which recalled the traditional way to enter a temple: first through the Torii, then the Sanmon, and down the Sandō before reaching the Honzon.

Cardinal Archbishop Peter Doi was personally ambivalent to the design, and future archbishop Peter Shirayanagi reluctantly approved the plans. Construction commenced in April 1963, and ended in December 1964. In addition to the sanctuary, made up of eight shells forming a cross, a reinforced-concrete detached bell tower rises to its west. Tange was awarded the Order of St. Gregory the Great for his design of the cathedral in 1970.

Kenzo Tange's funeral was held at St. Mary's in March 2005. In 2007, the cathedral underwent a comprehensive renovation, which renewed the stained glass and the steel shell, also fixing rain leakage problems which had plagued the building since its construction.

== Architecture ==
The layout of the building is in the form of a cross, from which eight hyperbolic parabolas open upwards to form a cross of light, which continues vertically along the length of the four facades. Through the use of parabolas, the rhomboidal ground floor is turned into a cross as the building rises. This Tange design inspired the later similar design of the landmark cathedral in San Francisco, also referred to as St. Mary's Cathedral.

To this rhomboid volume other secondary constructions are added, including the baptistry and the baptismal font. The rectangular shapes contrast with the symbolic character of the cathedral. The bell tower is 61.6 m (202 ft) high, standing a short distance away from the main building. The exterior cladding is made of stainless steel. In 2004 a large organ built by Italian firm Mascioni was installed.

Some critics have evaluated the cathedral as one of Tange's lesser works, dealing in cliché and failing to establish a civic space of the sort that Tange aspired to. Architectural historian David Stewart went as far as to state "the less said about Tokyo Cathedral, the better."

== Gallery ==
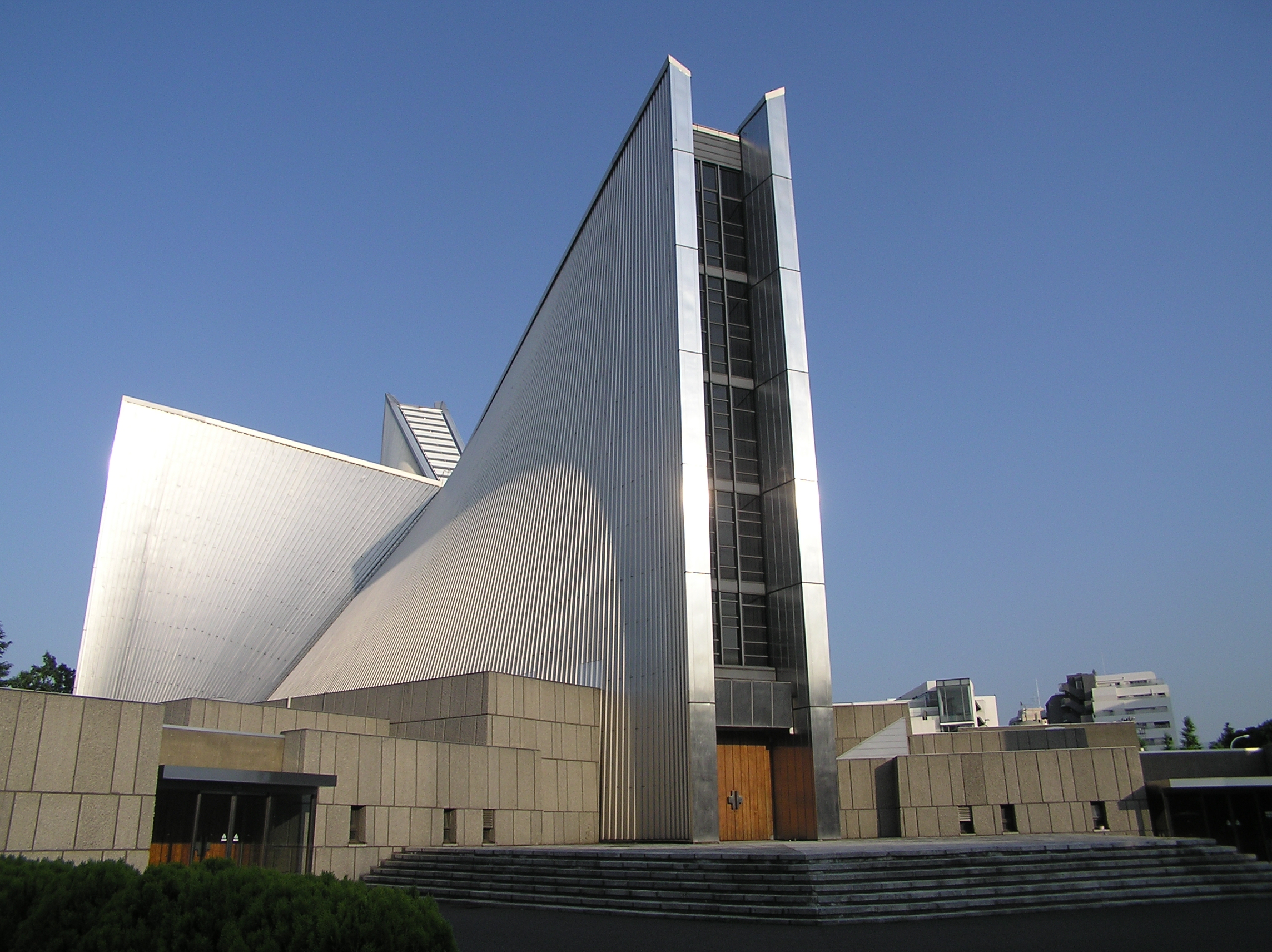
One quadrant of the Tokyo Cathedral, 2 July 2003

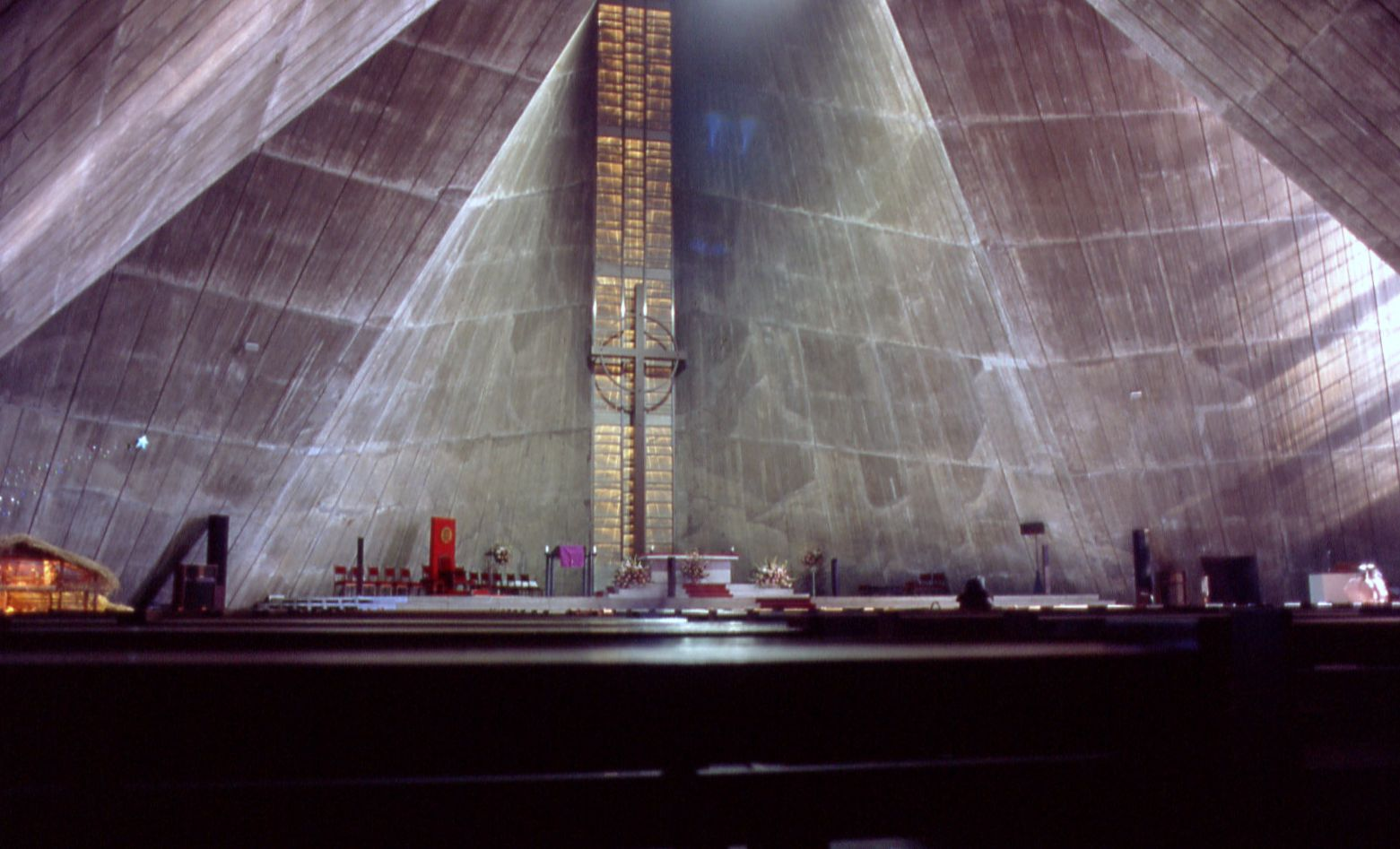
The interior in 1979

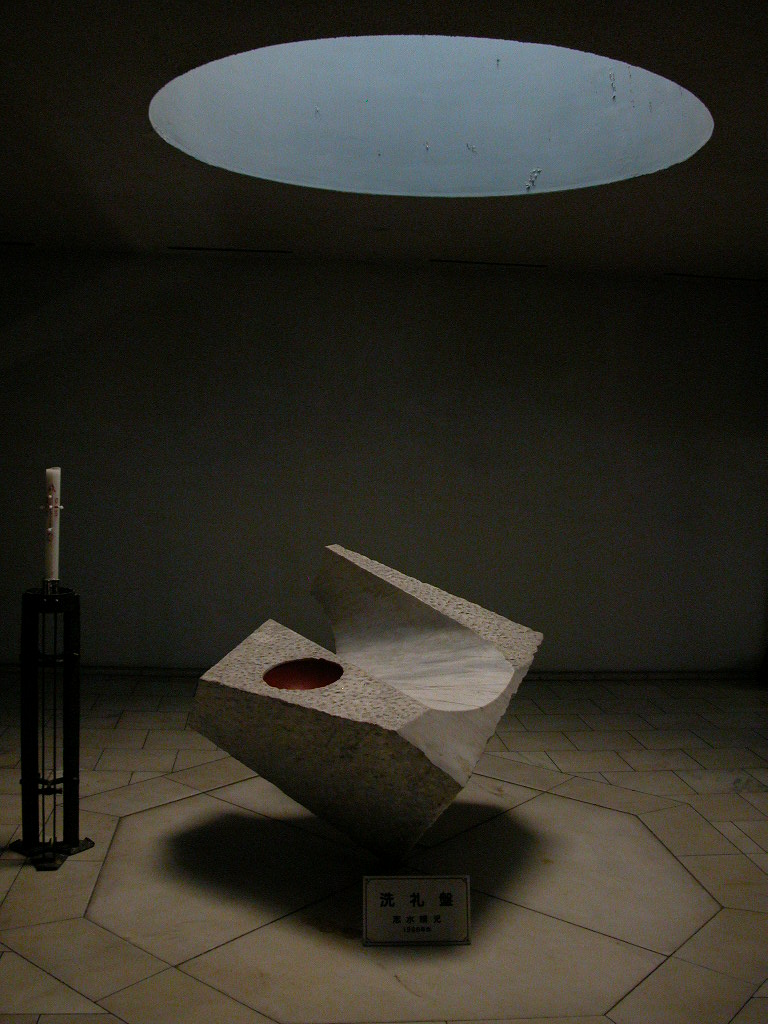
Baptismal font

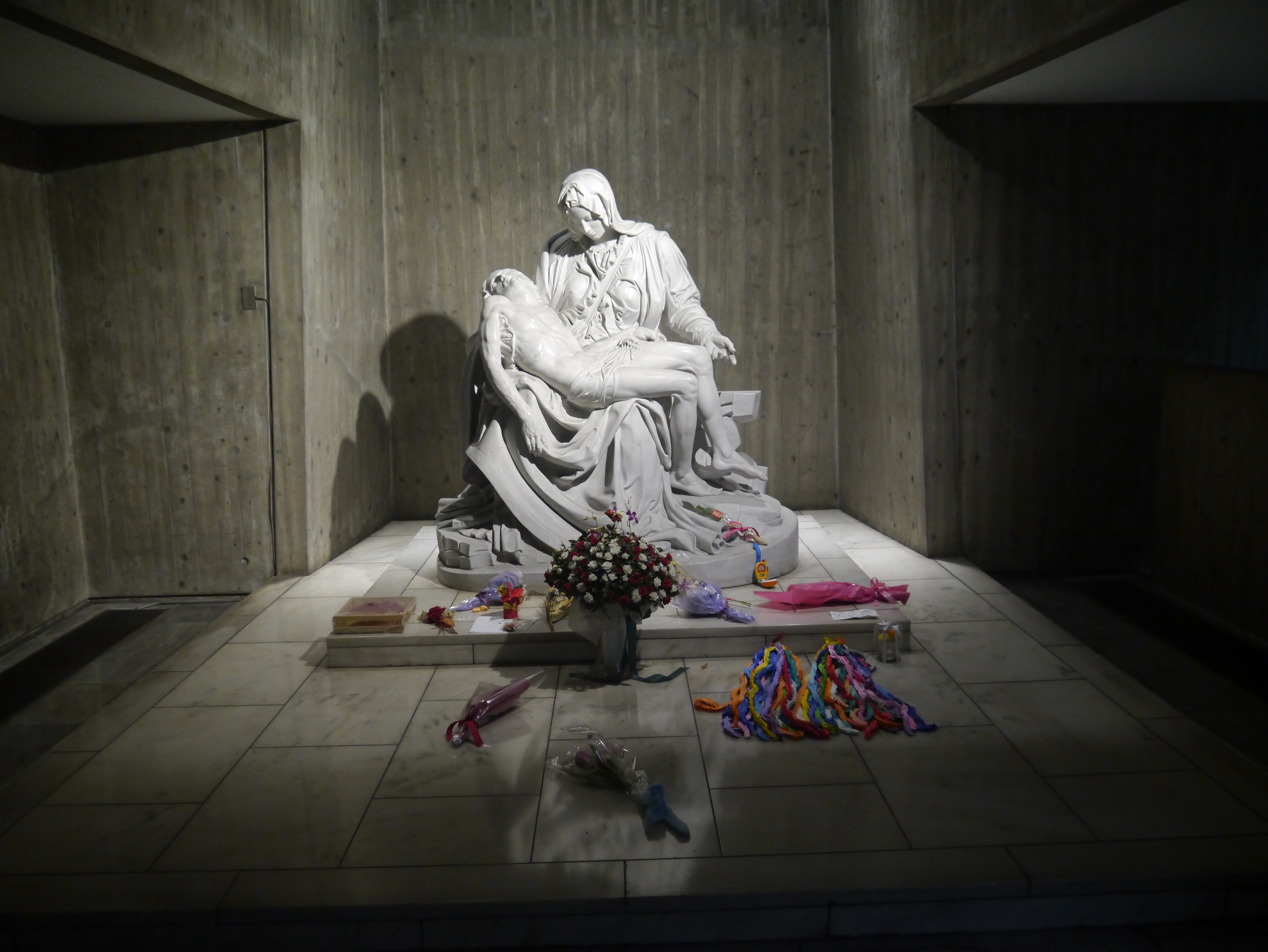
A reproduction of Michelangelo's Pietà inside

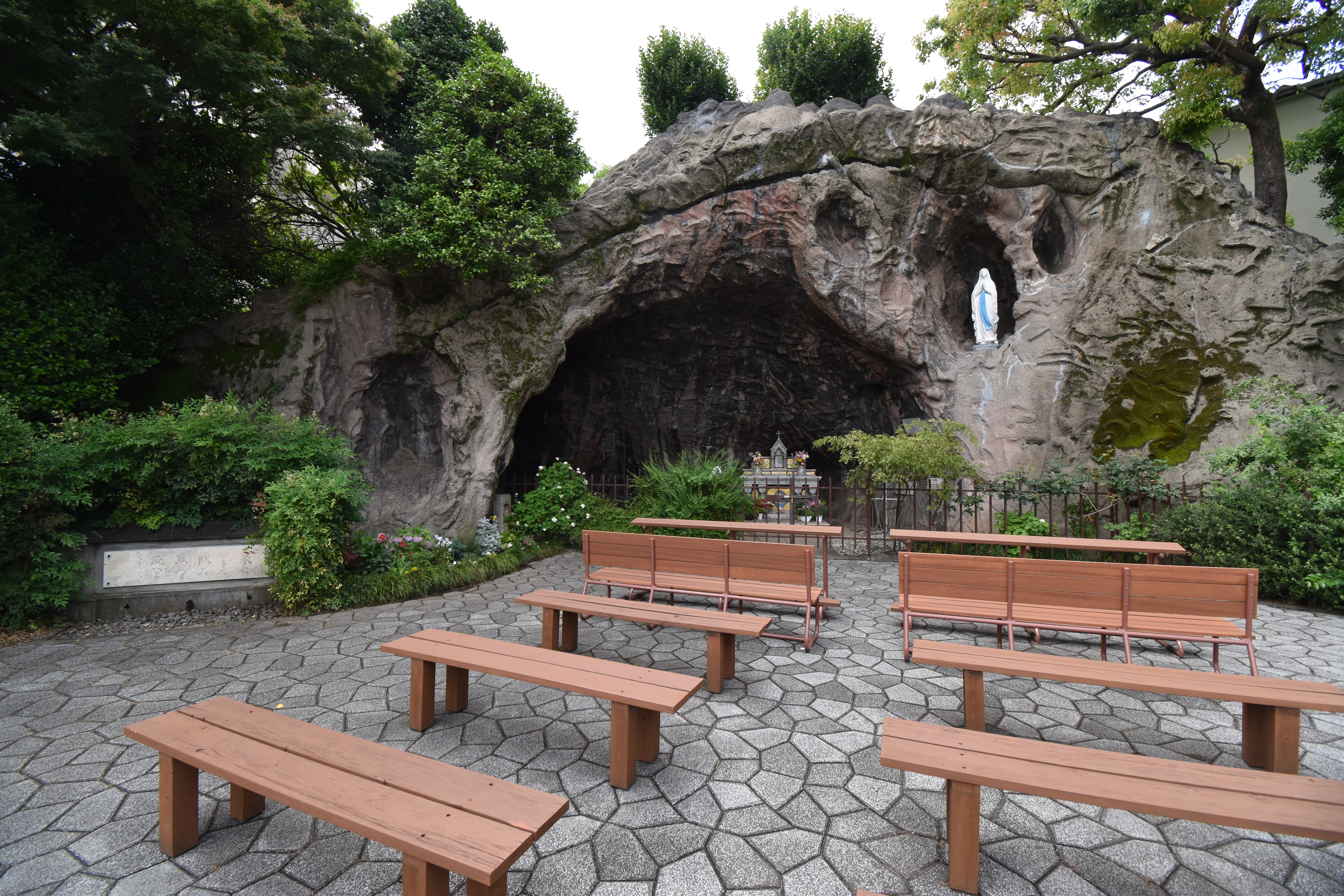
The Lourdes Grotto of the cathedral, which survived WWII air raids
