= San Giovanni Leonardi =

- Church of Saint John Leonardi
- Chiesa di San Giovanni Leonardi a Torre Maura
- Location within Rome
- 41°51′56″N 12°35′40″E
- Location: Via della Cicogna 2, Torre Maura, Rome
- Country: Italy
- Language: Italian
- Denomination: Catholic
- Tradition: Roman Rite
- Religious order: Clerics Regular of the Mother of God
- Website: sangiovannileonardi.com

History
- Status: titular church, parish church
- Dedication: John Leonardi
- Consecrated: 1991

Architecture
- Functional status: active
- Architect: Tullio Rossi
- Architectural type: Modern
- Completed: 1956

Administration
- Diocese: Rome

San Giovanni Leonardi is a 20th-century parochial church and titular church in eastern Rome, dedicated to Saint John Leonardi.

== History ==
The church was built in 1956 to a design by Tullio Rossi. It was visited in 1970 by Pope Paul VI and in 1992 by Pope John Paul II.

The church is in the care of the Clerics Regular of the Mother of God and is named for their founder, Saint John (Giovanni) Leonardi (1541–1609).

On 7 June 1989 it was the site of the funeral of Antonio De Falchi, a 19-year-old AS Roma fan murdered by hooligans following AC Milan; over 10,000 Roma fans attended inside and outside the church.

San Giovanni Leonardi was not inaugurated as a parish church until 1991.

On 7 December 2024, Pope Francis made it a titular church to be held by a cardinal-priest.

Cardinal-protectors

- Tarcisio Isao Kikuchi (2024 – present)
