= Peter Toshio Jinushi =

Japanese Roman Catholic bishop (1930–2021)

- Bishop of Sapporo
- Native name: ペトロ 地主敏夫
- Church: Catholic Church
- Diocese: Diocese of Sapporo
- In office: 3 October 1987 – 17 November 2009
- Predecessor: Benedict Takahiko Tomizawa
- Successor: Bernard Taiji Katsuya

Orders
- Ordination: 20 March 1960
- Consecration: 15 January 1988 by Peter Shirayanagi

Personal details
- Born: 20 September 1930 Sapporo, Hokkaido Department, Empire of Japan
- Died: 4 May 2021 (aged 90) Sapporo, Hokkaido, Japan

Peter Toshio Jinushi (20 September 1930 – 4 May 2021) was a Japanese Roman Catholic bishop. He was ordained to the priesthood in 1960 and served as bishop of the Roman Catholic Diocese of Sapporo from 1987 to 2009.
