= Rector (ecclesiastical) =

Ecclesiastical profession

A rector is, in an ecclesiastical sense, a cleric who functions as an administrative leader in some Christian denominations. In contrast, a vicar is also a cleric but functions as an assistant and representative of an administrative leader.

== Ancient usage ==
In early Christianity, bishops, as rulers of cities and provinces, especially in the Papal States, were called rectors, as were administrators of the patrimony of the Church (e.g. rector Siciliae). The Latin term rector was used by Pope Gregory I in Regula Pastoralis as equivalent to the Latin term pastor (shepherd).

== Catholic Church ==
In the Catholic Church, a rector is a person who holds the office of presiding over an ecclesiastical institution. The institution may be a particular building—such as a church (called his rectory church) or shrine—or it may be an organization, such as a parish, a mission or quasi-parish, a seminary or house of studies, a university, a hospital, or a community of clerics or religious.

If a rector appointed as his employee someone to perform the duties of his office, i.e. to act for him "vicariously", that employee was termed his vicar. Thus, the tithes of a parish are the legal property of the person who holds the office of rector. They are not the property of his vicar, who is not an office-holder but an employee, remunerated by a stipend, i.e. a salary, payable by his employer the rector. A parish vicar is the agent of his rector, whilst, higher up the scale, the Pope is called the Vicar of Christ, acting vicariously for the ultimate superior in the ecclesiastical hierarchy.

The 1983 Code of Canon Law, for the Latin Church of the Catholic Church, explicitly mentions as special cases three offices of rectors:

- rectors of seminaries (c. 239 & c. 833 #6)
- rectors of churches that do not belong to a parish, a chapter of canons, or a religious order (c. 556 & 553)
- rectors of Catholic universities (c. 443 §3 #3 & c. 833 #7)

However, these are not the only officials who exercise their functions using the title of rector. Since the term rector refers to the function of the particular office, a number of officials are not referred to as rectors even though they are rectors in actual practice. The diocesan bishop, for instance, is himself a rector, since he presides over both an ecclesiastical organization (the diocese) and an ecclesiastical building (his cathedral). In many dioceses, the bishop delegates the day-to-day operation of the cathedral to a priest, who is often incorrectly called a rector but whose specific title is plebanus or "people's pastor", especially if the cathedral operates as a parish church. Therefore, because a priest is designated head of a cathedral parish, he cannot be both rector and pastor, as a rector cannot canonically hold title over a parish (c. 556).

As a further example, the pastor of a parish (parochus) is pastor (not rector) over both his parish and the parish church. Finally, a president of a Catholic university is rector over the university and, if a priest, often the rector of any church that the university may operate, on the basis that it is not a canonical establishment of a parish (c. 557 §3).

In some religious congregations of priests, rector is the title of the local superior of a house or community of the order. For instance, a community of several dozen Jesuit priests might include the pastor and priests assigned to a parish church next door, the faculty of a Jesuit high school across the street, and the priests in an administrative office down the block. However, the community as a local installation of Jesuit priests is headed by a rector.

Rector general is the title given to the superior general of certain religious orders, e.g. the Clerics Regular of the Mother of God, Pallottines.

There are some other uses of this title, such as for residence hall directors, such as Father George Rozum CSC, at the University of Notre Dame which were once (and to some extent still are) run in a seminary-like fashion. This title is used similarly at the University of Portland, another institution of the Congregation of Holy Cross.

The Pope is called "rector of the world" during the discontinued papal coronation ceremony that was once part of the papal inauguration. (Note: Latin: rectorem orbis.)

Permanent rector is an obsolete term used in the United States prior to the codification of the 1917 Code of Canon Law. Canon Law grants a type of tenure to pastors (parochus) of parishes, giving them certain rights against arbitrary removal by the bishop of their diocese. In order to preserve their flexibility and authority in assigning priests to parishes, bishops in the United States until that time did not actually appoint priests as pastors, but as "permanent rectors" of their parishes: the "permanent" gave the priest a degree of confidence in the security in his assignment, but the "rector" rather than "pastor" preserved the bishop's absolute authority to reassign clergy. Hence, many older parishes list among their early leaders priests with the postnominal letters "P.R." (as in, a plaque listing all of the pastors of a parish, with "Rev. John Smith, P.R."). This practice was discontinued and today priests are normally assigned as pastors of parishes, and bishops in practice reassign them at will (though there are still questions about the canonical legality of this).

== Anglican churches ==
In Anglican churches, a rector is a type of parish priest.

=== Historical use ===
Historically, parish priests in the Church of England consisted of rectors, vicars, and perpetual curates. Parish churches and their incumbent clergy were supported by tithes, a form of local tax levied on the personal as well as agricultural output of the parish. Law at the time distinguished between greater tithes, which included all things of value that come from the ground (such as grain crops, hay, and wood) and lesser tithes, which encompassed things that depended on that which arose from the ground: livestock, and the products of livestock such as eggs, milk and butter. A rector received direct payment of both the greater and lesser tithes of his parish, whilst a vicar received only the lesser tithes (the greater tithes going to the lay holder, or impropriator, of the living). A perpetual curate held the cure of souls in an area which had not yet been formally or legally constituted as a parish, and received neither greater nor lesser tithes, but only a small stipend in return for his duties. Perpetual curates tended to have a lower social status, and were often quite poorly remunerated.

Quite commonly, parishes that had a rector as priest also had glebe lands attached to the parish. The rector was then responsible for the repair of the chancel of his church—the part dedicated to the sacred offices—while the rest of the building was the responsibility of the parish. This rectorial responsibility persists, in perpetuity, with the occupiers of the original rectorial land where it has been sold. This is called chancel repair liability, and affects institutional, corporate and private owners of land once owned by around 5,200 churches in England and Wales. (See also Church of England structure.)

=== Contemporary English use ===
The traditional titles of rector and vicar continue in English use today, although the roles and the conditions of employment of the two titles are now essentially the same. Which of the titles is held by the parish priest is largely historical, some parishes having a rector and others a vicar. Owing to the origins of the terms, parishes with a rector are often of more notable historical importance or prominence than parishes with a vicar.

The title of perpetual curate was abolished in 1968. However, "Priest-in-charge" is now a common third form of title in the contemporary Church of England, and is applied to the parish priest of a parish in which presentation to the living has been suspended—a process by which the bishop takes temporary responsibility for the appointment of the parish priest, regardless of who holds the legal rights of patronage in that parish.

From the middle of the twentieth century the Church of England has developed team ministries, in which several priests work in a team to run a group of parishes and churches. In such a team arrangement, the senior priest holds the title "Team Rector", whilst other incumbent priests in the team are entitled "Team Vicar".

In the Deanery of Jersey, which is part of the Church of England, a rector is appointed to one of the island's twelve historic parishes and as such has a role in the civil parish administration alongside the Constable; the parish also takes full responsibility (through levy of rates) for maintaining the church. Vicars are appointed to district churches, have no civil administrative roles by right, and their churches' upkeep is resourced by the members of the congregation.

=== Contemporary use in other nations ===
In the Church of Ireland, Scottish Episcopal Church and Anglican Church of Canada, most parish priests are called rectors, not vicars. However, in some dioceses of the Anglican Church of Canada rectors are officially licensed as incumbents to express the diocesan polity of employment of clergy.

In the Episcopal Church in the United States of America, the "rector" is the priest elected to head a self-supporting parish. A priest who is appointed by the bishop to head a parish in the absence of a rector is termed a "priest-in-charge", as is a priest leading a mission (that is, a congregation which is not self-supporting). "Associate rectors" are priests hired by the parish to supplement the rector in his or her duties while "assistant rectors" are priests resident in the congregation who help on a volunteer basis. Some churches use the terms "associate priest" and "assistant priest;" however, ordained priests are fully equal in their ordination without qualifiers, but a church may hire or appoint an assistant rector or associate rector to supplement the duties of the parish's rector. The positions of "vicar" and "curate" are not recognized in the canons of the national church. However, some diocesan canons do define "vicar" as the priest-in-charge of a mission; and "curate" is often used for assistants, being entirely analogous to the English situation.

In schools affiliated with the Anglican church the title "rector" is sometimes used in secondary schools and boarding schools, where the headmaster is often a priest.

== See also ==
- Rector (academia)
- Rector (politics)
