= Andrea Lembo =

Roman Catholic Bishop from 2023

Most Reverend Andrea Lembo, P.I.M.E
- Auxiliary Bishop of Tokyo; Titular Bishop of Mulia
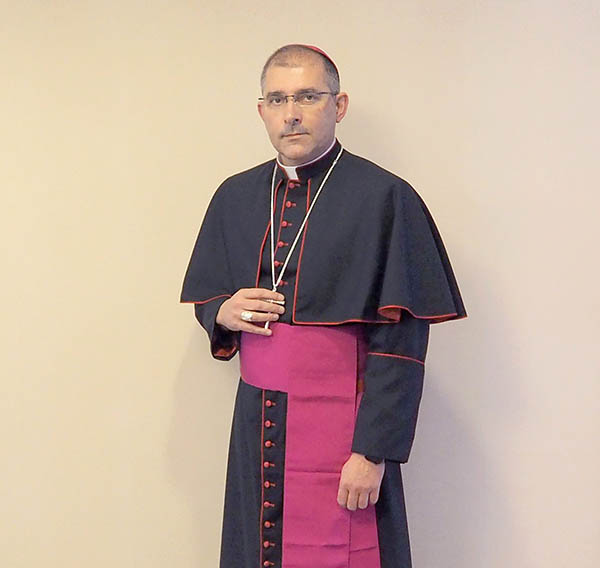
- Church: Catholic Church; Latin Church
- Diocese: Archdiocese of Tokyo; Titular Episcopal See of Mulia
- Appointed: 16 September 2023
- Successor: Incumbent

Orders
- Ordination: 12 June 2004 by Dionigi Tettamanzi
- Consecration: 16 December 2023 by Tarcisio Isao Kikuchi

Personal details
- Born: Andrea Lembo; 23 May 1974 (age 52) Treviglio, Italy
- Education: Divine Word Seminary; Theological University of Northern Italy – Turin Campus
- Motto: SICUT DILEXI VOS "As I Have Loved You"
- Coat of arms

Andrea Lembo is a Roman Catholic prelate appointed as Auxiliary Bishop of Roman Catholic Archdiocese of Tokyo and Titular Bishop of Mulia by Pope Francis since 2023.

== Early life and education ==
Bishop Lembo was born in Treviglio (BG) in Italy on 23 May 1974. He attended P.I.M.E. International Theological Seminary in Monza and P.I.M.E. Regional House in Detroit, USA. He holds a bachelor's degree in theology from the Divine Word School of Theology, Tagaytay, Philippines. He also attended the Theological Faculty of Northern Italy.

== Priesthood ==
Lembo was ordained as a priest for Priest of Pontifical Institute for Foreign Missions in Milan on 12 June 2004 by Dionigi Tettamanzi.

== Episcopate ==
Andrea was appointed Auxiliary Bishop of the Roman Catholic Archdiocese of Tokyo and Titular Bishop of Mulia by Pope Francis on 16 September 2023. He was Ordained a bishop by Tarcisio Isao Kikuchi on 16 December 2023
