= Peter Takeo Okada =

Japanese Catholic priest (1941–2020)

His Excellency, The Most Reverend Peter Takeo Okada
- Archbishop of Tokyo
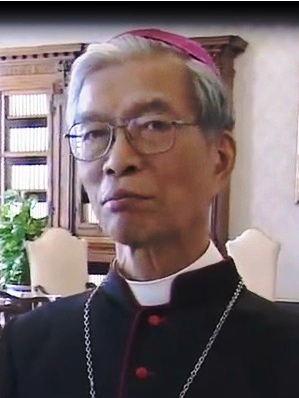
- Okada in 2015
- Native name: 岡田 武夫
- Archdiocese: Tokyo
- Appointed: 17 February 2000
- Installed: 2000
- Term ended: 25 October 2017
- Predecessor: Peter Shirayanagi
- Successor: Tarcisio Isao Kikuchi, S.V.D.
- Previous post: Bishop of Urawa (1991-2000)

Orders
- Ordination: 3 November 1973 by Peter Shirayanagi
- Consecration: 16 September 1991 by Peter Shirayanagi
- Rank: Archbishop

Personal details
- Born: October 24, 1941 Ichikawa, Chiba, Japan
- Died: December 18, 2020 (aged 79) Tokyo, Japan
- Denomination: Catholic
- Education: University of Tokyo

Styles of Peter Takeo Okada
- Reference style: The Most Reverend
- Spoken style: Your Grace
- Religious style: Monsignor
- Posthumous style: not applicable

Peter Takeo Okada (岡田 武夫, Okada Takeo; 24 October 1941 – 18 December 2020) was a Japanese prelate of the Catholic Church who served as Archbishop of Tokyo from 2000 to 2017.

Okada was born in Ichikawa in Chiba Prefecture. He graduated from the University of Tokyo with the LL.B. He was ordained a priest on 3 November 1973. On 15 April 1991, he was appointed Bishop of Urawa by Pope John Paul II. He received his episcopal consecration on 16 September from Seiichi Shirayanagi, with Archbishops Paul Hisao Yasuda and Francis Xavier Kaname Shimamoto serving as co-consecrators.

Following the early resignation of Cardinal Shirayanagi, Pope John Paul II appointed him Archbishop of Tokyo on June 12, 2000. His installation took place on the following 3 September. He was president of the Japanese bishops' conference.

On October 27, 2012, Pope Benedict XVI named Okada a member of the Pontifical Council for Interreligious Dialogue.

In January 2011, the Holy See countermanded the decision of Japan's bishops to suspend the activities of a controversial lay movement, the Neocatechumenal Way, for five years.

On July 27, 2013, Pope Francis named him Apostolic Administrator of the Diocese of Saitama.

Pope Francis accepted his resignation on October 25, 2017, and appointed Bishop Tarcisio Isao Kikuchi, S.V.D. of the Niigata diocese to succeed him.

Okada died on 18 December 2020 in Tokyo. He was 79 years old.

Catholic Church titles
Preceded by Francis Xavier Kaname Shimamoto	Bishop of Urawa; 1991—2000	Succeeded by Marcellino Taiji Tani
Preceded by Peter Seiichi Cardinal Shirayanagi	Archbishop of Tokyo; 2000—2017	Succeeded by Tarcisio Isao Kikuchi S.V.D.
