= Marcellino Taiji Tani =

Japanese Roman Catholic bishop (1953–2026)

Marcellino Daiji Tani
- Native name: 谷 大二
- Church: Catholic Church
- Archdiocese: Tokyo
- Diocese: Saitama
- Appointed: 10 May 2000
- Installed: 15 September 2000
- Term ended: 27 July 2013
- Predecessor: Peter Takeo Okada
- Successor: Mario Michiaki Yamanouchi

Orders
- Ordination: 21 March 1986
- Consecration: 15 September 2000 by Peter Takeo Okada

Personal details
- Born: Taiji Tani; 13 February 1953 Takarazuka, Hyōgo, Japan
- Died: 10 October 2026 (aged 73) Saitama, Japan
- Education: Sophia University

Marcellino Taiji Tani (谷 大二, Tani Taiji; 13 February 1953 – 10 October 2026) was a Japanese Roman Catholic prelate who served as the bishop of the Diocese of Saitama from 2000 until his resignation in 2013. He was appointed bishop of the Diocese of Urawa in May 2000 and received episcopal consecration in September of that year.

== Early life and education ==
Tani was born on 13 February 1953 in Takarazuka, Hyōgo Prefecture, Japan. He entered the Interdiocesan Major Seminary of Tokyo and studied philosophy and theology at Sophia University.

== Priesthood ==
Tani was ordained a priest for the Diocese of Urawa on 21 March 1986. After his ordination, he served as an assistant parish priest in Urawa from 1986 to 1987 and as parish priest in Ageo from 1987 to 1994. He subsequently became chancellor of the Diocese of Urawa and served as parish priest of Tatebayashi.

He was appointed bishop of Urawa by Pope John Paul II on 10 May 2000, succeeding Peter Takeo Okada, who had been appointed Archbishop of Tokyo. The appointment was announced by the Holy See in June 2000.

== Episcopacy ==
Tani was consecrated a bishop on 15 September 2000. He became the sixth bishop of Urawa, a diocese covering Saitama, Tochigi, Gunma and Ibaraki prefectures. The diocese was renamed the Diocese of Saitama on 31 March 2003, following the municipal reorganisation that created Saitama City.

During his episcopacy, Tani was associated with efforts to serve migrant communities and promote a multicultural Catholic community in Japan. The Diocese of Urawa had established services for foreign residents in response to the increasing number of Catholic migrants in the region.

He resigned from the pastoral governance of the Diocese of Saitama on 27 July 2013. Following his resignation, he held the title of bishop emeritus. His successor, Mario Michiaki Yamanouchi, was appointed in 2018.

== Death ==
Tani died at Saitama Red Cross Hospital in Saitama, Japan, on 10 October 2026, at the age of 73. His death was announced by the Catholic Bishops' Conference of Japan on 13 October.

Catholic Church titles
| Preceded by Peter Takeo Okada | Bishop of Urawa/Saitama; 2000–2013 | Succeeded by Mario Michiaki Yamanouchi |
