= Diocese of Saitama =

Roman Catholic diocese in Japan

Coordinates: 35.8611°N 139.6442°E

Diocese of Saitama Dioecesis Saitamaensis カトリックさいたま教区

Location
- Country: Japan
- Territory: Saitama, Tochigi, Gunma, and Ibaraki
- Ecclesiastical province: Tokyo
- Metropolitan: Tokyo

Statistics
- Area: 22,604 km^{2} (8,727 sq mi)
- Population: Total; Catholics: (as of 2020); 14,074,691; 119,820 (0.9%)

Information
- Rite: Latin Rite
- Cathedral: Cathedral of St Theresa of the Child Jesus in Urawa, Saitama

Current leadership
- Pope: Leo XIV
- Bishop: Mario Michiaki Yamanouchi
- Metropolitan Archbishop: Tarcisio Isao Kikuchi

Map
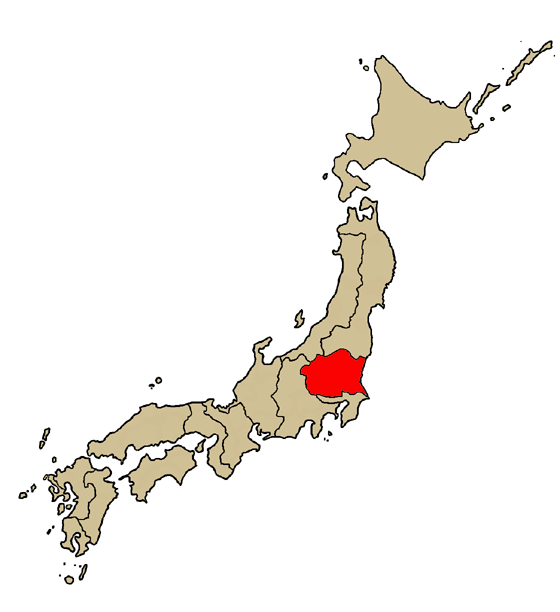

Website
- Website of the Diocese

The Diocese of Saitama (Latin: Dioecesis Saitamaensis, Japanese: カトリックさいたま教区) is a Latin Church diocese of the Catholic Church located in the city of Saitama in the ecclesiastical province of Tokyo in Japan.

== History ==
- January 4, 1939: Established as Apostolic Prefecture of Urawa from the Diocese of Yokohama
- December 16, 1957: Promoted as Diocese of Urawa
- March 31, 2003: Renamed as Diocese of Saitama

== Leadership ==
- Prefects Apostolic of Urawa (Roman rite)
  - Fr. Ambroise Leblanc (アンブローズ・ルブラン), OFM (1939 – 1940)
  - Fr. Paul Sakuzo Uchino (パウロ内野作蔵) (1945.12.13 – 1957)
- Bishops of Urawa (Roman rite)
  - Bishop Laurentius Satoshi Nagae (ラウレンチオ長江 恵) (1957.12.24 – 1979.12.20)
  - Archbishop Francis Xavier Kaname Shimamoto (フランシスコ・ザビエル島本要), Ist. del Prado (1979.12.20 – 1990.02.08)
  - Archbishop Peter Takeo Okada (ペトロ岡田武夫) (1991.04.15 – 2000.02.17)
- Bishops of Saitama (Roman rite)
  - Bishop Marcellino Taiji Tani (マルセリーノ谷大二) (2000.05.10 -Resigned 2013.07.27)
  - Bishop Mario Michiaki Yamanouchi, SDB (マリオ山野内倫) (2018.06.02 – present)

== See also ==
- Roman Catholicism in Japan

== Sources ==
- GCatholic.org
- Catholic Hierarchy
