= Peter Shirayanagi =

Japanese Roman Catholic prelate (1928–2009)

His Eminence Peter Seiichi Shirayanagi
- Cardinal, Archbishop emeritus of Tōkyō
- Church: Roman Catholic
- Archdiocese: Tokyo
- Installed: 21 February 1970
- Term ended: 17 February 2000
- Predecessor: Peter Doi
- Successor: Peter Takeo Okada
- Other post: Cardinal-Priest of Santa Emerenziana a Tor Fiorenza
- Previous posts: Auxiliary Bishop of Tōkyō (1966–1969); Coadjutor Archbishop of Tōkyō (1969–1970)

Orders
- Ordination: 21 December 1954
- Consecration: 8 May 1966
- Created cardinal: 26 November 1994 by John Paul II
- Rank: Cardinal

Personal details
- Born: 白柳 誠一 Shirayanagi Seiichi; 17 June 1928 Hachiōji, Tokyo Japan
- Died: 30 December 2009 (aged 81) Tokyo, Japan

Styles of Peter Shirayanagi
- Reference style: His Eminence
- Spoken style: Your Eminence
- Informal style: Cardinal
- See: Tokyo

Peter Seiichi Shirayanagi (白柳 誠一 Shirayanagi Seiichi; 17 June 1928 – 30 December 2009) was a Japanese Catholic prelate who served as Archbishop of Tokyo from 1970 to 2000. He was made a cardinal in 1994, and also served as head of the Catholic Bishops' Conference of Japan from 1983 to 1992.

== Life ==
Peter Seiichi Shirayanagi was born in Hachiōji, Tokyo, Japan, 17 June 1928. Shirayanagi studied at Sophia University, earning a degree in philosophy in 1951 and a specialization in theology in 1954. Ordained a priest on 21 December 1954 at Kanda Catholic Cathedral. From 1954 to 1957 he served in pastoral ministry in the archdiocese of Tōkyō. He then went to study at the Pontifical Urban University in Rome, earning a doctorate in Canon law in 1960.

Consecrated titular Bishop of Atenia and Auxiliary of Tokyo in 1966, he was named titular Archbishop of Castro and Coadjutor Archbishop of the Tokyo Archdiocese in 1969, and succeeded to the post of Archbishop of Tokyo in 1970. He attended the Second Ordinary Assembly of the Synod of Bishops in Vatican City, from 30 September to 6 November 1971.

As archbishop, he was representative director of the Juridical Foundation of Tokyo Caritas House. He continued the Tokyo Archdiocesan Convention, implementing the decrees of the Second Vatican Council. From 1983 to 1992, he presided over the Japanese Catholic Bishops' conference, which opened the Japanese Catholic Center in Tokyo in 1990. Also in 1990 the Archbishop told the Italian periodical 30 Giorni, that "the events of Akita are no longer to be taken seriously." In 1981, Archbishop Shirayanagi organized events connected to the first papal visit to Japan. In 1989 he led a group to visit the Catholic Church in China.

In 1994, Pope John Paul II created him a Cardinal with the title of Cardinal-Priest of Santa Emerenziana a Tor Fiorenza. On 12 June 2000, he retired as archbishop of Tokyo. He was one of the cardinal electors who participated in the 2005 papal conclave that selected Pope Benedict XVI. On 24 November 2008 in Nagasaki, he represented the Pope, presiding over the beatification ceremony of the 188 Martyrs of Japan.

Cardinal Shirayanagi was hospitalized at the beginning of August 2009 for cardiac arrhythmia, then suffered a light cerebral hemorrhage. On 23 December he moved to Loyola House, a Jesuit home for aged priests in Tokyo, where he died on 30 December. The funeral service was held at St. Mary's Cathedral, Tokyo. Pope Benedict XVI recalled Cardinal Shirayanagi's continued commitment "to spreading the Gospel, ... his work promoting justice and peace and his tireless efforts for the refugees."

Shirayanagi was an honorary member of AV Edo-Rhenania zu Tokio, a Catholic student fraternity that is affiliated with Cartellverband.
