= Peter Doi =

Japanese Catholic Cardinal (1892–1970)

His Eminence Peter Doi
- Cardinal, Archbishop of Tokyo
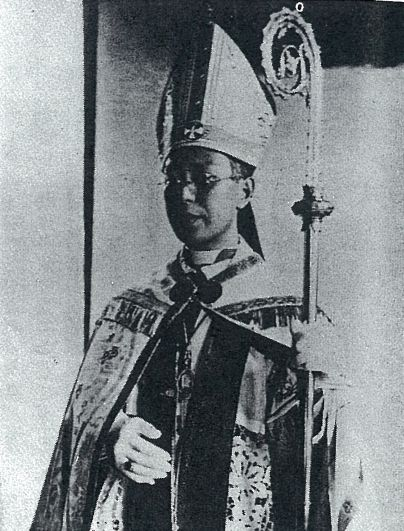
- Doi in 1938
- See: Tokyo
- Installed: 2 December 1937
- Term ended: 21 February 1970
- Predecessor: Jean-Alexis Chambon, MEP
- Successor: Peter Shirayanagi

Orders
- Ordination: 1 May 1921
- Consecration: 13 February 1938
- Created cardinal: 28 March 1960 by John XXIII

Personal details
- Born: 22 December 1892 Sendai, Miyagi, Japan
- Died: 21 February 1970 (aged 77) Tokyo, Japan
- Motto: A solis ortu (Latin for 'From the rising of the sun')

Styles of Peter Doi
- Reference style: His Eminence
- Spoken style: Your Eminence
- Informal style: Cardinal
- See: Tokyo

Peter Tatsuo Doi (土井 辰雄 Doi Tatsuo) (22 December 1892 – 21 February 1970) was a Japanese prelate of the Catholic Church. He served as Archbishop of Tokyo from 1937 until his death in 1970, and was made a cardinal in 1960.

== Biography ==
Doi Tatsuo was born in Sendai. He was baptized at the age of nine, on 21 April 1902, with the baptismal name of Peter. He studied at the seminary in Sendai and the Pontifical Urbaniana University in Rome.

Doi was ordained to the priesthood on 1 May 1921. Doi then did pastoral work in Sendai until 1934, when he was made Secretary of the Apostolic Delegation to Japan.

On 2 December 1937, Doi was appointed Archbishop of Tokyo by Pope Pius XI. He received his episcopal consecration on 13 February 1938 from Archbishop Jean-Alexis Chambon, MEP, with Bishops Paul Aijiro Yamaguchi and Marie-Joseph Lemieux serving as co-consecrators. During World War II, Doi served as executive director of the National Catholic Central Committee. He was Apostolic Administrator of Yokohama from 1945 to 1947.

Pope John XXIII created him Cardinal Priest of S. Antonio da Padova in Via Merulana in the consistory of 28 March 1960. Doi, hoped by the Vatican to enliven the Church in Japan, thus became the first Japanese member of the College of Cardinals. A celebration of this event was held at the St. Ignatius church in Tokyo, a church which was dedicated by Doi in 1949. He attended the Second Vatican Council from 1962 to 1965, and was later one of the cardinal electors who participated in the 1963 papal conclave that selected Pope Paul VI.

Doi died in Tokyo, aged 77. He is buried in St. Mary's Cathedral.

Doi, along with Stefan Wyszyński, assisted Paul Peter Meouchi in delivering one of the closing messages of the Second Vatican Council on 8 December 1965.

Catholic Church titles
Preceded by Jean-Alexis Chambon, MEP	Archbishop of Tokyo; 1937–1970	Succeeded by Peter Shirayanagi
