= St. Theresa of the Child Jesus Cathedral, Urawa =

Coordinates: 35.8589°N 139.6431°E

St. Theresa of the Child Jesus Cathedral
- 幼いイエスの聖テレジア司教座聖堂
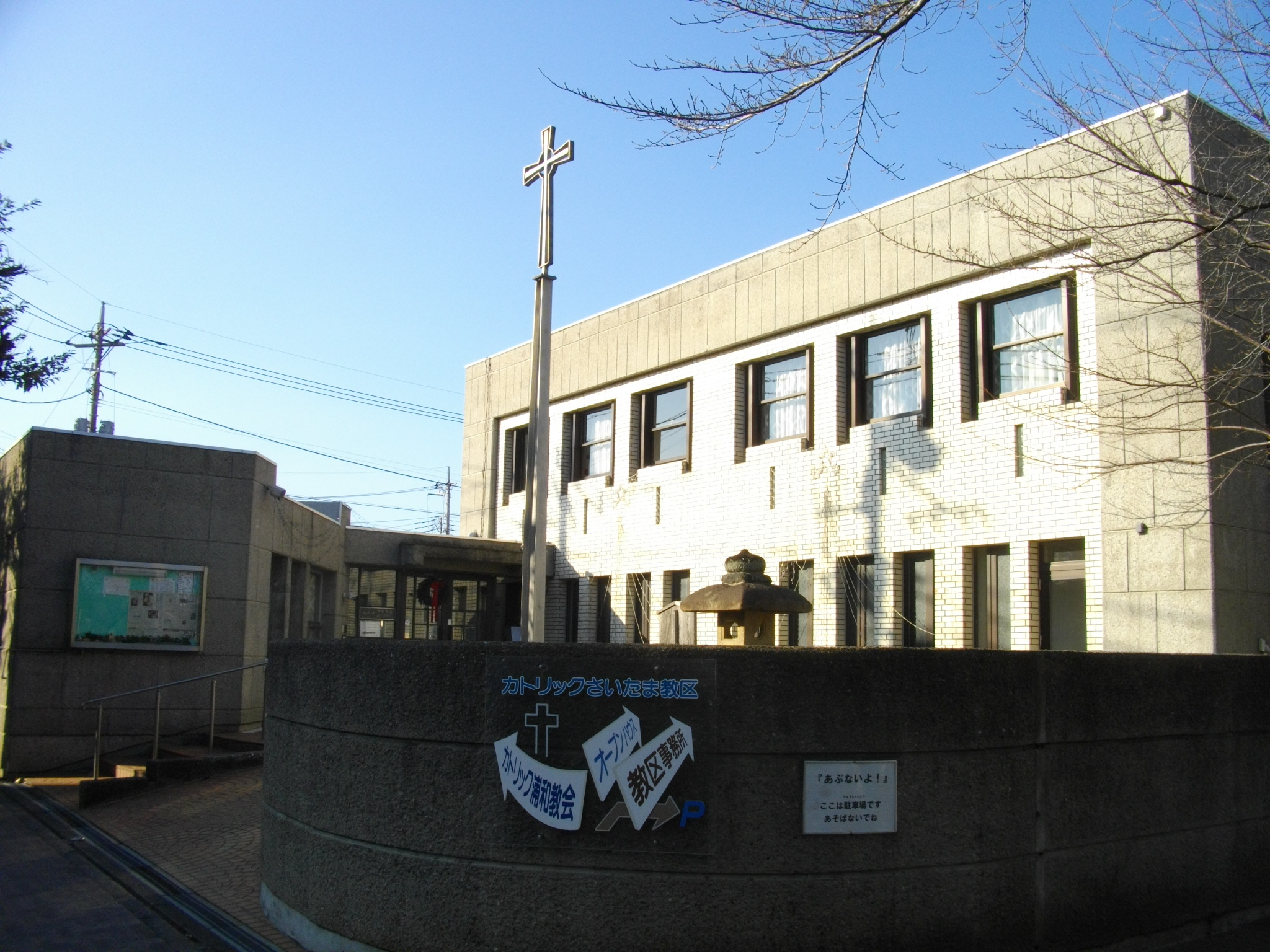
- St. Theresa of the Child Jesus Cathedral
- Location: Urawa, Saitama
- Country: Japan
- Denomination: Roman Catholic Church

The Cathedral of St. Theresa of the Child Jesus (Japanese: 幼いイエスの聖テレジア司教座聖堂), also called the Urawa Church, is a parish of the Roman Catholic Church in Urawa, Saitama prefecture, Japan. It is seat of the bishop of the Roman Catholic Diocese of Saitama. (Dioecesis Saitamaensis; カトリックさいたま教区)

Founded in 1940, it is dedicated to Saint Thérèse of Lisieux, a French Discalced Carmelite canonized in 1925 and proclaimed a Doctor of the Church in 1997 by Pope John Paul II. It was elevated to cathedral status in 1957 upon the erection of the Diocese of Saitama, by the papal bull "Qui superna Dei" of Pope Pius XII.

== See also ==
- Catholic Church in Japan
