= John Leonardi =

Italian Roman Catholic saint

Saint Giovanni Leonardi OMD
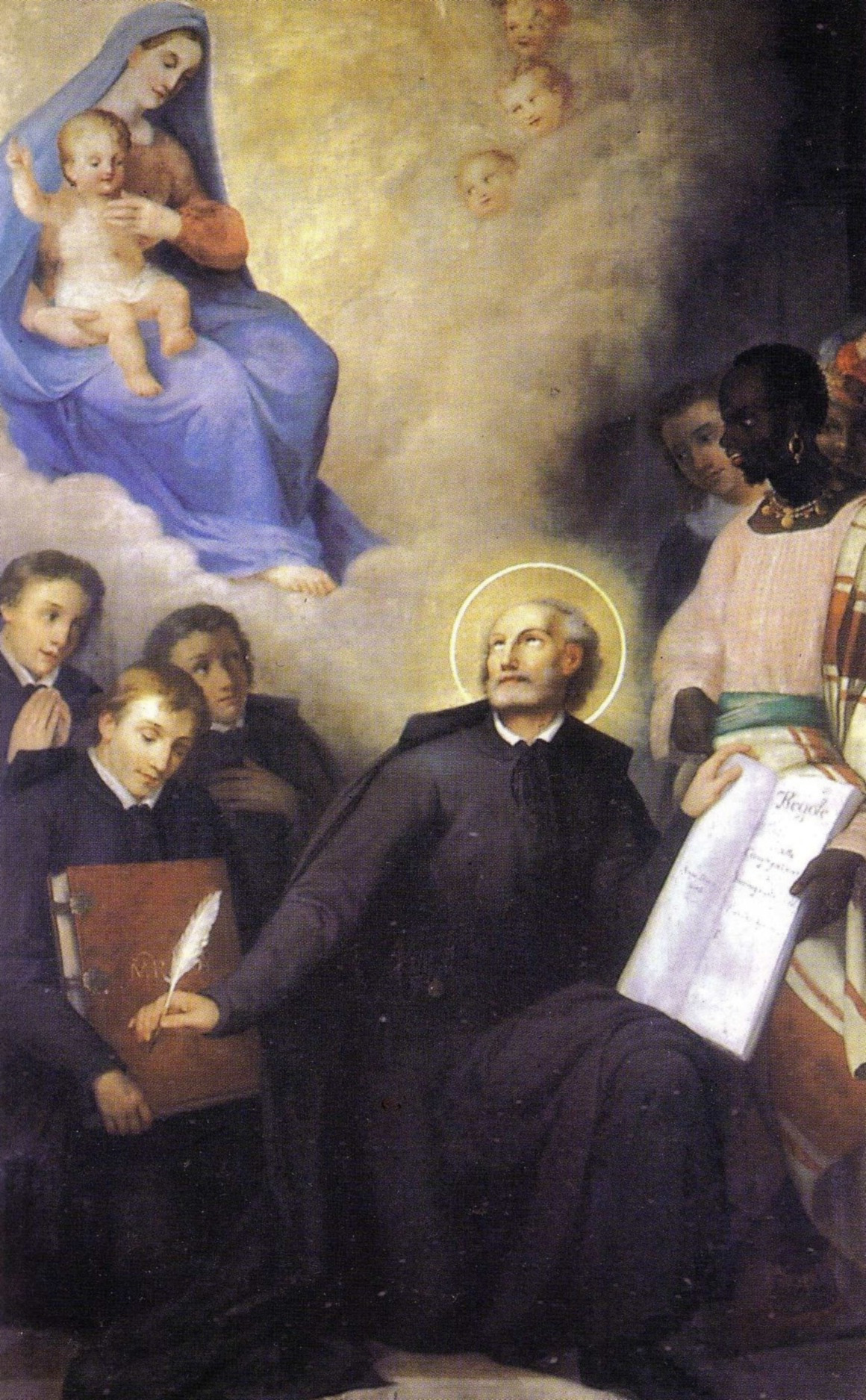

Priest
- Born: 1541; Diecimo, Lucca, Republic of Lucca
- Died: 9 October 1609 (aged 67–68); Rome, Papal States
- Venerated in: Roman Catholic Church
- Beatified: 10 November 1861, Saint Peter's Basilica, Papal States by Pope Pius IX
- Canonized: 17 April 1938, Saint Peter's Basilica, Vatican City by Pope Pius XI
- Major shrine: Santa Maria in Campitelli, Italy
- Feast: 9 October
- Attributes: Priest's cassock Rule of the Order; Quill; Mortar and pestle
- Patronage: Pharmacists; Clerics Regular of the Mother of God of Lucca

John Leonardi, OMD (Italian: Giovanni Leonardi; 1541 – 9 October 1609) was an Italian Catholic priest and the founder of the Clerics Regular of the Mother of God of Lucca.

== Biography ==
He was the youngest of seven children born to middle-class parents in Diecimo (now within the comune of Borgo a Mozzano) in the Republic of Lucca. From childhood, he sought solitude and wished to dedicate himself to prayer and meditation. At age 17, he began his ten-year study to become a certified pharmacist's assistant in Lucca. Afterward, he studied for the priesthood and was ordained in 1572, as a member of the now defunct Apostolic Clerics of St. Jerome. He first dedicated himself to the Christian formation of adolescents in his local Lucca parish. He also gathered a group of laymen around him to work in hospitals and prisons.

In 1574, he founded a group charged with deepening Christian faith and devotion; this foundation was part of the wider movement of the Counter-Reformation. Leonardi worked with this group to spread devotion to the Blessed Virgin Mary and devotion to the Forty Hours, as well as spreading the message of the importance of frequent communion.

== Founding the order ==
He became interested in the reforms instituted by the Council of Trent, and he proposed a new congregation of secular priests to convert sinners and to restore Church discipline. In 1583, his association, which became known as the Lucca Fathers, was recognized by the Bishop of Lucca with the approval of Pope Gregory XIII. In 1595, his congregation was confirmed by Pope Clement VIII, and he assumed the religious name "Giovanni of the Mother of God". This foundation received approval from Pope Paul V on January 14, 1614. The pope, encouraged by the cardinal protector Giustiniani, issued a papal decree approving the union of the Lucca Fathers with the Piarists of Saint Joseph Calasanz. This union would last only until the beginning of 1617, when Paul V issued another decree constituting the Piarists as a separate congregation.

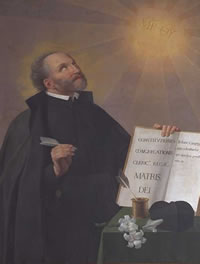
St. Giovanni Leonardi

Civic leaders in Lucca opposed the establishment of a new religious order for political reasons and acted to stop its formation. While ultimately ineffective, their efforts forced John Leonardi to spend most of the remainder of his life outside Lucca, with special exceptions granted by its government as he was under the protection of the pope. Leonardi took his work to Rome where he became friends with Saint Philip Neri. Neri became his spiritual director and held him in high regard for his qualities of firmness and judgment. In 1596 Pope Clement VIII nominated Leonardi as Commissary Apostolic for the reform of the Benedictine monks of the Order of Monte Vergine and in 1601 their Cardinal Protector appointed him to carry out a similar work among the Vallombrosans.

In 1603, he founded, along with Cardinal J. Vivès, the seminary of the Propagation of the Faith for the philosophical and theological training of missionary priests. In 1621, his community would formally be designated "Clerks Regular of the Mother of God'". The final Rule of his institute was published in 1851. Two houses of the Clerks Regular of the Mother of God were opened when he died, and three others were opened in the seventeenth century.

== Death and sainthood ==
He died on 9 October 1609, of influenza, which he contracted while ministering to his brothers suffering from the epidemic raging in Rome at the time.

He was venerated for his miracles and his religious fervour. His memory was held so high in Rome that Pope Leo XIII added his name to the Roman Martyrology, and ordered Roman clergy to celebrate his Mass and Office, an honour otherwise strictly limited to beatified popes.

Leonardi was beatified in 1861 and canonized in 1938 by Pope Pius XI. His liturgical feast is celebrated on 9 October. His relics are enshrined under an altar in the Church of Santa Maria in Campitelli in Rome. The church of San Giovanni Leonardi in Zone XV Torre Maura in the east of Rome is named in his honour.

== Sources ==
- "Encyclopédie des Saints et de la Sainteté," Hachette (in French)
- Alberto Comuzzi (1988). San Giovanni Leonardi : un nomo per tutte le vocazioni [San Juan Leonardi : un hombre apasionado por Cristo y por la Iglesia] (in Italian, French, and Spanish) (4th ed.). Cinisello Balsamo (Milan); Santiago de Chile: Edizioni Paoline. p. 167. OCLC 645374429.
- Bernard Baudouin (2016). Encyclopédie des saints : tous les saints de l'Église de Rome, leurs oeuvres & leurs bienfaits (in French). Bulgary: Éditions Trajectoire DL. p. 330. ISBN 978-2-84197-707-9. OCLC 1010280696.
