= Santa Maria Corteorlandini, Lucca =

Church building in Lucca, Italy

Coordinates: 43.8446°N 10.5017°E

Santa Maria Corteorlandini is a Baroque- style, Roman Catholic church located on a street of the same name in Lucca, region of Tuscany, Italy.

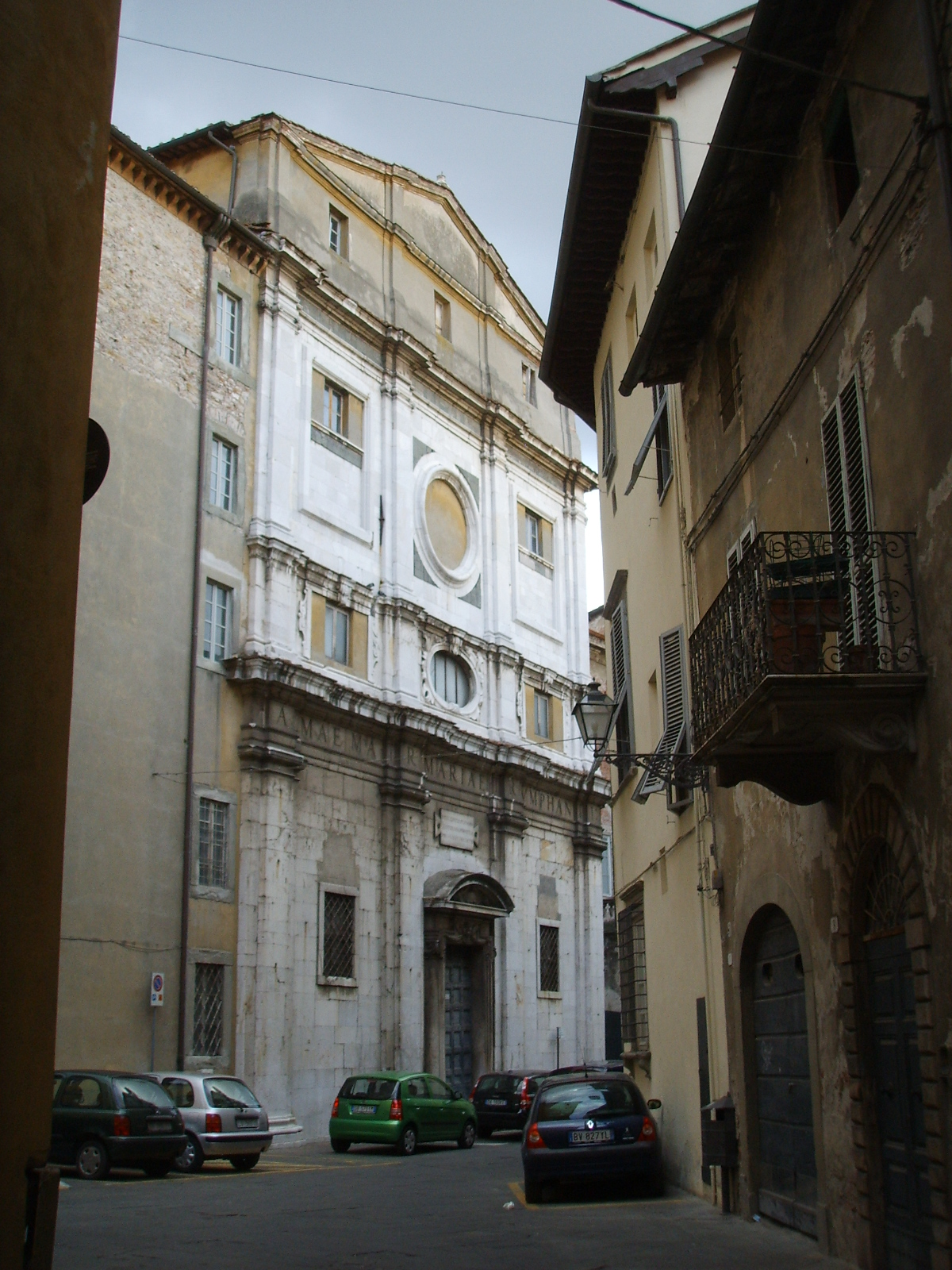
Facade

== History ==
A church at the site was present by 1099. One of the Romanesque portals still remains on the flank. In 1580 the church was affiliated with the Clerics Regular of the Mother of God of Lucca. Decoration continued over the next century.
