= Holy Guardian Angels Church =

National monument of Chile

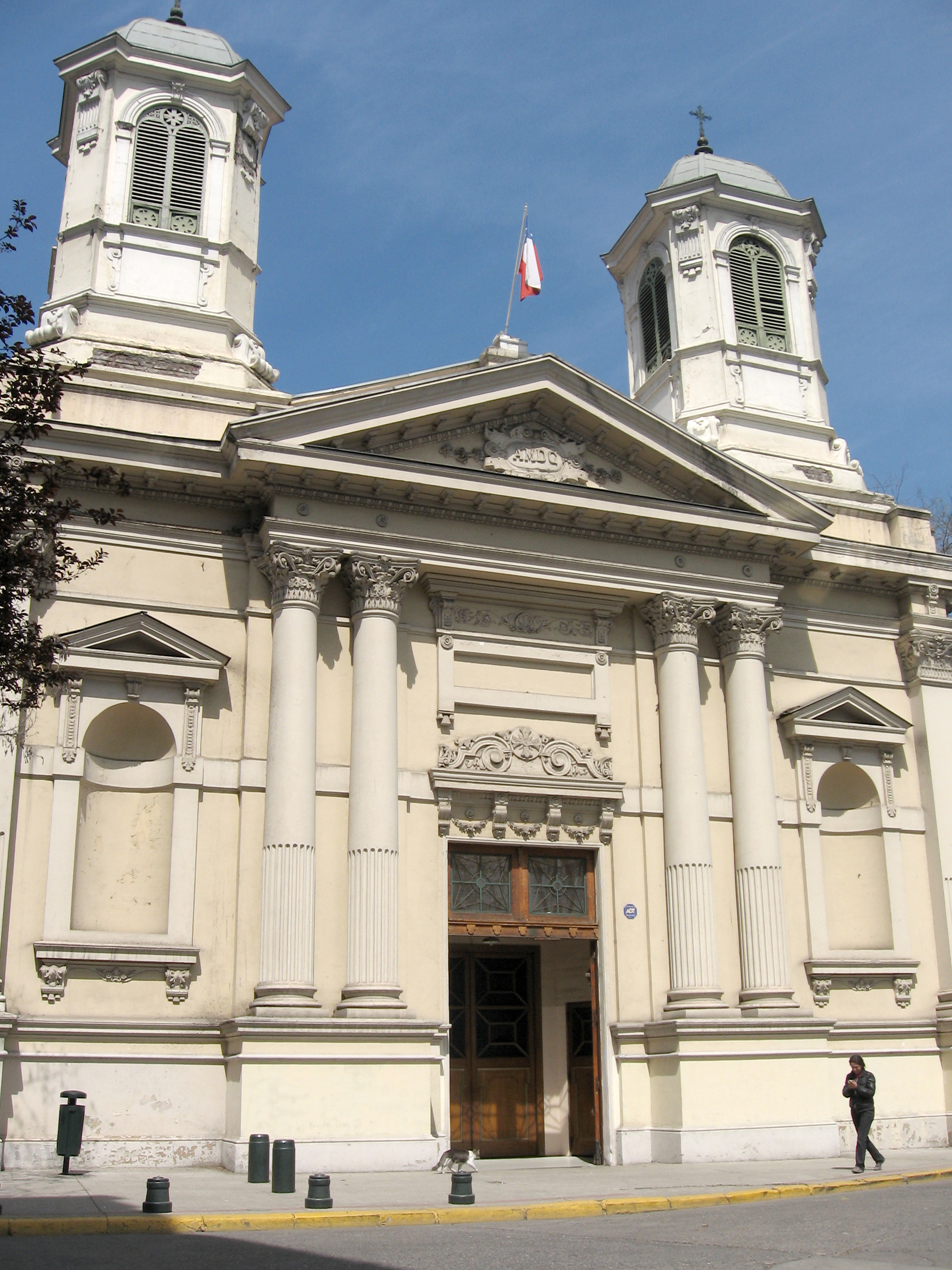

- Location within Chile

Religion
- Affiliation: Roman Catholic

Location
- Location: Santiago
- Country: Chile
- Interactive map of Holy Guardian Angels Church
- Coordinates: 33.436456°S 70.629878°W

The Holy Guardian Angels Church is a Catholic church located in Providencia, Santiago de Chile. It was declared as a National Monument of Chile in 1990, within the category of Historic Monuments.

== History ==
In 1853, the then Archbishop of Santiago de Chile Rafael Valentín Valdivieso purchased a part of the Quinta Alegre estate and adjacent farm lands to found a seminary in Santiago. The site was roughly bounded by the present day streets: Providencia Avenue, Condell Street, Rancagua Street and Seminario Street.

In 1884, Monsignor Casanova ordered the construction of a new church building to replace the overcrowded original chapel of the seminary.

== Architecture ==
The church building was designed in a Roman-influenced style by the architect Ignacio Cremonessi. It has a Latin cross plan. The front facade features an engaged portico with a triangular pediment supported by paired columns. The main entrance is flanked by pedimented niches.
