= Atenia (Pisidia) =

Town of ancient Pisidia, Byzantium

Coordinates: 37°55′21″N 31°32′10″E

Atenia or Atenoa (Ancient Greek: Ὰτενόα), also known as Atmenia (Ὰτμενία), was a town of ancient Pisidia. It became a bishopric; no longer the seat of a residential bishop, it remains a titular see of the Roman Catholic Church.

Its site is located near Kireli Kasaba, in Asiatic Turkey.
