= St. Ignatius Church, Tokyo =

Church in Tokyo, Japan

St. Ignatius Church (聖イグナチオ教会)
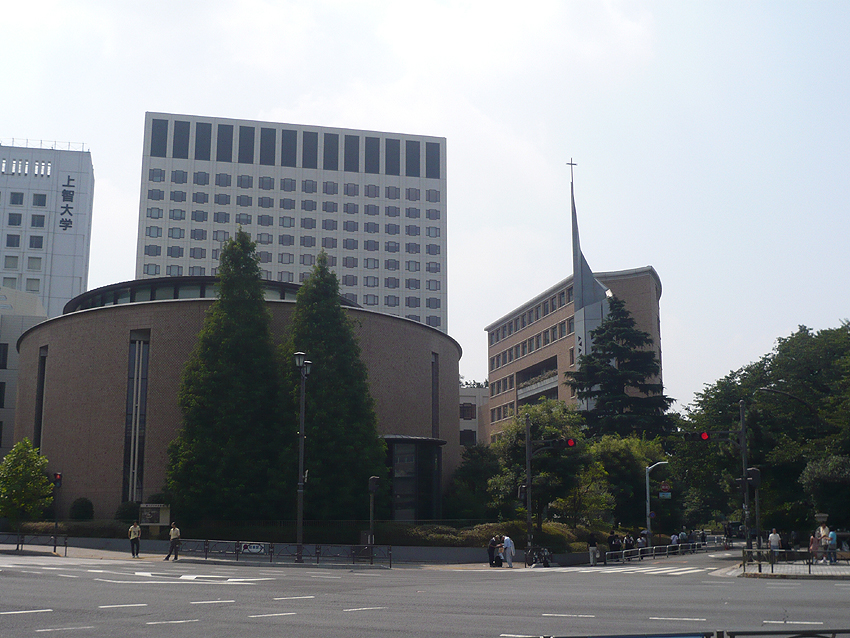
- Exterior of St. Ignatius Church in October 2007
- St. Ignatius Church (聖イグナチオ教会)
- 35°41′05″N 139°43′51″E
- Location: 6-5 Kōjimachi, Chiyoda-ku, Tokyo 102-0083
- Country: Japan
- Denomination: Catholic

History
- Former name: St.Thérèse Church
- Dedicated: 1949, 1999

Architecture
- Completed: 1949, 1999

Clergy
- Abbot: Johannes Bezikofer; Dominicus Hiroyuki Ikejiri; Josephus Koichi Matsumoto
- Priest(s): Saturnino Ochoa, S.J.

The St. Ignatius Church (Japanese: 聖イグナチオ教会) is a Catholic church located in Kōjimachi district of Tokyo, Japan. Also known as the Kōjimachi Catholic Church, it was established with its current name on April 17, 1949, and is dedicated to Saint Ignatius of Loyola. The dedication ceremony was offered by Archbishop Peter Tatsuo Doi. The church is affiliated with the Jesuit Sophia University and it is located near Yotsuya Station.

== History ==
Before the founding of St. Ignatius, there was a catholic church near its current location in Kōjimachi. This church was called Saint Theresa of the Infant Jesus and it was burned down during an air raid in 1945. Temporarily, the Sophia University Jesuit chapel served as the Kōjimachi church.

The first building of the St. Ignatius church, designed by the Jesuit architect Ignatius Gropper, was a wooden structure that could fit 500 people. It was completed and dedicated in 1949. Construction of the current building started in May 1995. The church now has an oval-shape which symbolizes life and resurrection, and a floor space of 1,450 sq. meters. The structure has 12 columns representing the 12 apostles and 12 stained glass windows with nature themes.

During the COVID-19 pandemic, the church served boxed bento lunches to people in need.

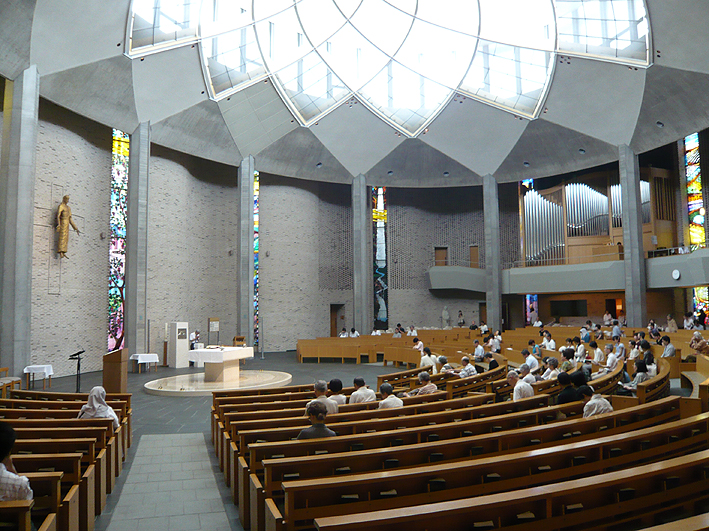
Interior, October 2007

The German Jesuit scholar and playwright Herman Heuvers was the first pastor of St. Ignatius Church, and was honorary pastor when he died in 1977.

The Jesuit theologian and scholar of Zen Buddhism, Heinrich Dumoulin, was buried in the church after his death in 1995.
