= Tarcisio Isao Kikuchi =

Japanese Catholic prelate (born 1958)

His Eminence Tarcisio Isao Kikuchi SVD
- Cardinal, Archbishop of Tokyo; President of Caritas Internationalis
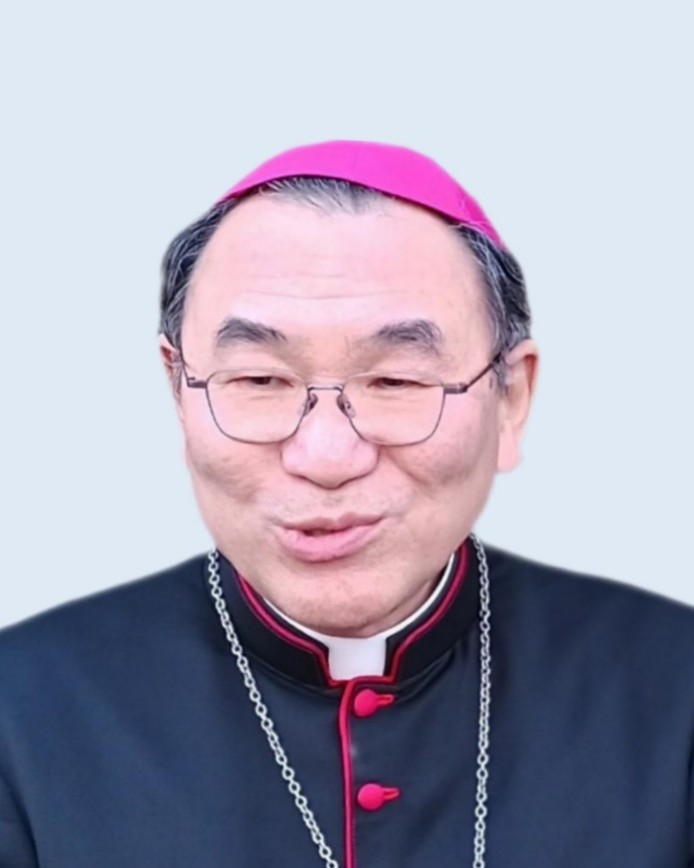
- Kikuchi in 2024
- Native name: 菊地功
- Church: Catholic Church
- Archdiocese: Tokyo
- See: Tokyo
- Appointed: 25 October 2017
- Installed: 16 December 2017
- Predecessor: Peter Takeo Okada
- Other post: Cardinal-Priest of San Giovanni Leonardi (2024–present)
- Previous posts: Bishop of Niigata (2004–17); Apostolic Administrator of Sapporo (2009–13)

Orders
- Ordination: 15 March 1986 by Aloysius Nobuo Soma
- Consecration: 20 September 2004 by Peter Takeo Okada
- Created cardinal: 7 December 2024 by Pope Francis
- Rank: Cardinal-Priest

Personal details
- Born: Tarcisio Isao Kikuchi; 1 November 1958 (age 68) Miyako, Iwate, Japan
- Motto: Varietate unitas; (Unity in diversity); (多様性の中の統一); (Tayō-sei no naka no tōitsu)

Styles of Tarcisio Isao Kikuchi
- Reference style: His Eminence
- Spoken style: Your Eminence
- Religious style: Cardinal
- Informal style: Cardinal
- See: Tokyo

Ordination history of Tarcisio Isao Kikuchi
History
Priestly ordination
- Ordained by: Aloysius Nobuo Soma (Nagoya)
Episcopal consecration
- Principal consecrator: Peter Takeo Okada
- Co-consecrators: Rafael Masahiro Umemura (Yokohama); Marcellino Taiji Tani; ( Saitama)
Episcopal succession
Bishops consecrated by Tarcisio Isao Kikuchi as principal consecrator
- Mario Michiaki Yamanouchi, S.D.B.: 24 September 2018
- Paul Daisuke Narui, S.V.D.: 22 September 2020
- Edgar Gacutan, C.I.C.M.: 19 March 2022

Tarcisio Isao Kikuchi, S.V.D. (Japanese: 菊地 功, romanized: Kikuchi Isao; born 1 November 1958) is a Japanese Catholic prelate who has served as Archbishop of Tokyo since 2017 and president of Caritas Internationalis since May 2023. He was Bishop of Niigata from 2004 to 2017. He previously worked as a missionary in Ghana. He is a member of the Divine Word Missionaries.

Kikuchi has served as president of Caritas Japan and Caritas Asia, as well as a member of the Representative Council of Caritas Internationalis. He was made a cardinal in 2024 by Pope Francis.

== Biography ==
Kikuchi Isao was born in Iwate on 1 November 1958. He studied for the priesthood in Japan and took his vows as a member of the Divine Word Missionaries (the "Verbiti" or "Verbites") in March 1985 and he was ordained a priest on 15 March 1986. He did additional studies at the Spiritual Institute of Sacred Heart in Melbourne.

From 1986 to 1992 he worked as a missionary in Ghana in the Archdiocese of Accra and the Diocese of Koforidua, working as a parish priest in rural areas. He returned to Japan and served his order as formator, vice prefect of novices, and vocations director for a year and then as its provincial councilor from 1994 to 1999, taking on several additional roles. Beginning in 1994 he also began teaching at Nanzan University and became a member of the International Aid Committee of the Japanese Bishops Conference. He became coordinator of his order's Office of Justice and Peace for Asia in 1996. He became a member of Caritas Japan in 1998 and began representing the Japanese bishops at international conferences in 1998.

He served as executive director of Caritas Japan from 1999 to 2004, after first gaining experience with that organization as a volunteer in the refugee camp in Bukavu (then in Zaire, now in the Democratic Republic of the Congo) in the 1990s. Kikuchi was elected provincial of his order's Japanese province in 1999 and elected to a second three-year term in 2002. He became a member of the Diocese of Nagoya's committee for permanent clerical formation that same year.

Pope John Paul II appointed him the Bishop of Niigata on 29 April 2004. He received his episcopal consecration on 20 September at the Salle de Seishin Girls' High School in Niigata from Archbishop Peter Takeo Okada of Tokyo, with Bishops Rafael Masahiro Umemura of Yokohama and Marcellino Taiji Tani of Saitama as co-consecrators. He took as his motto Varietate Unitas (Unity in Diversity).

On 13 September 2014, Pope Francis named him a member of the Congregation for the Evangelization of Peoples.

He attended the beatification for Takayama Ukon in Osaka in 2017 and proposed the late samurai as "a model for all" since he had "renounced privileges and wealth for the faith".

Pope Francis appointed Kikuchi Archbishop of Tokyo on 25 October 2017. Kikuchi was installed there on 16 December 2017.

He has been a member of the Representative Council of Caritas International and headed Caritas Asia from 2011 to 2019. On 15 May 2023, Kikuchi was elected to a four-year term as president of Caritas Internationalis.

In the summer of 2021, when Japan had declared its fourth state of emergency because of the COVID-19 pandemic, Kikuchi canceled plans for his parishes to provide services to participants and support staff of the 2020 Olympics and Paralympics. He announced that those visiting Tokyo for the games "will be requested to refrain from visiting churches".

Kikuchi is president of the Japanese Bishops Conference and secretary general of the Federation of Asian Bishops Conferences.

On 6 October 2024, Pope Francis announced that he planned to make Kikuchi a cardinal on 8 December, a date that was later changed to 7 December. Kikuchi praised Francis for "this symbolic gesture of appointing number of cardinals from the challenging mission areas in Asia".

On 7 December 2024, Pope Francis made him a cardinal, assigning him as a member of the order of cardinal priests the title of San Giovanni Leonardi.

He participated as a cardinal elector in the 2025 papal conclave that elected Pope Leo XIV.

== Positions ==
=== North Korea ===
Kikuchi has been a staunch advocate for dialogue in relation to North Korea's nuclear program and their diplomatic crisis with the United States of America. In August 2017 he expressed his hope that the Japanese government would undertake "an initiative of dialogue that involves all the sides concerned in this crisis to find a diplomatic solution".

He also asserted that dialogue remains "the only solution to peaceful coexistence in this part of Asia". He also accused "new political leaders" of exploiting the confrontation for their own political purposes and called for renewed negotiations.

=== Evangelization ===
Kikuchi supports missionary and evangelization efforts. He affirms that it is vital to "sow and witness the Gospel in our society today" though ponders on "where and how to evangelize" in the community. Kikuchi continues that "it is up to us to proclaim and witness the joy of the Gospel to mankind today. The grace of Christ sustains us and guides us in this journey" to bring His message to others.

Kikuchi spoke on evangelization during the visit of Cardinal Fernando Filoni to Japan in September 2017 and expressed his hope that evangelization efforts on the part of the faithful would be "humble" but bold and direct.

=== The environment ===
Kikuchi is a strong advocate of environmental protection and wrote a piece for Asia News in support of the pope's encyclical Laudato si'. The bishop said that in the piece that it was the role of all Christians in the protection and development of the environment with the proper allocation of resources on an equal level. He further asserted that "we must act to protect the lives of future generations" if "environmental degradation" went unchecked and too far. He further elaborated that the encyclical provided a "solid foundation" to be built upon for committing oneself to environmental protection and activism.

=== LGBT rights ===
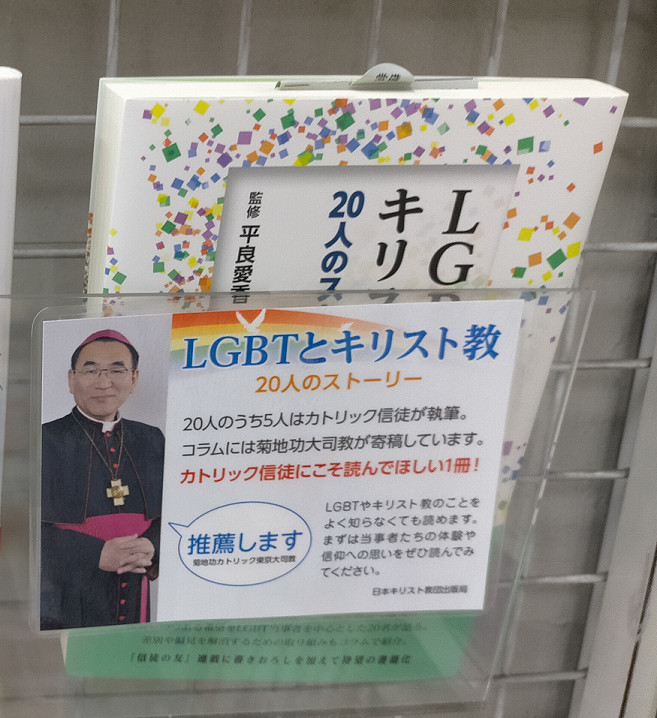
An infographic in a store highlighting Kikuchi's recommendation of LGBT & Christianity.

Kikuchi recommended and contributed to LGBT and Christianity, a volume supportive of LGBT rights, which was supervised by Aika Taira, a gay pastor of the United Church of Christ in Japan. The book was promoted by the Catholic HIV/AIDS Desk, an organization that, with the support of the Japanese Episcopal Conference, provides health information and fights anti-LGBT discrimination.

== See also ==
- Catholic Church in Japan
- Cardinals created by Pope Francis

Catholic Church titles
Preceded by Francis Keiichi Sato	Bishop of Niigata; 2004 – 2017	Succeeded by Paul Daisuke Narui
Preceded by Peter Takeo Okada	Archbishop of Tokyo; 2017 – present	Incumbent
