= Guardian Angels Cathedral, Sapporo =

Guardian Angels Cathedral
- 守護の天使司教座聖堂
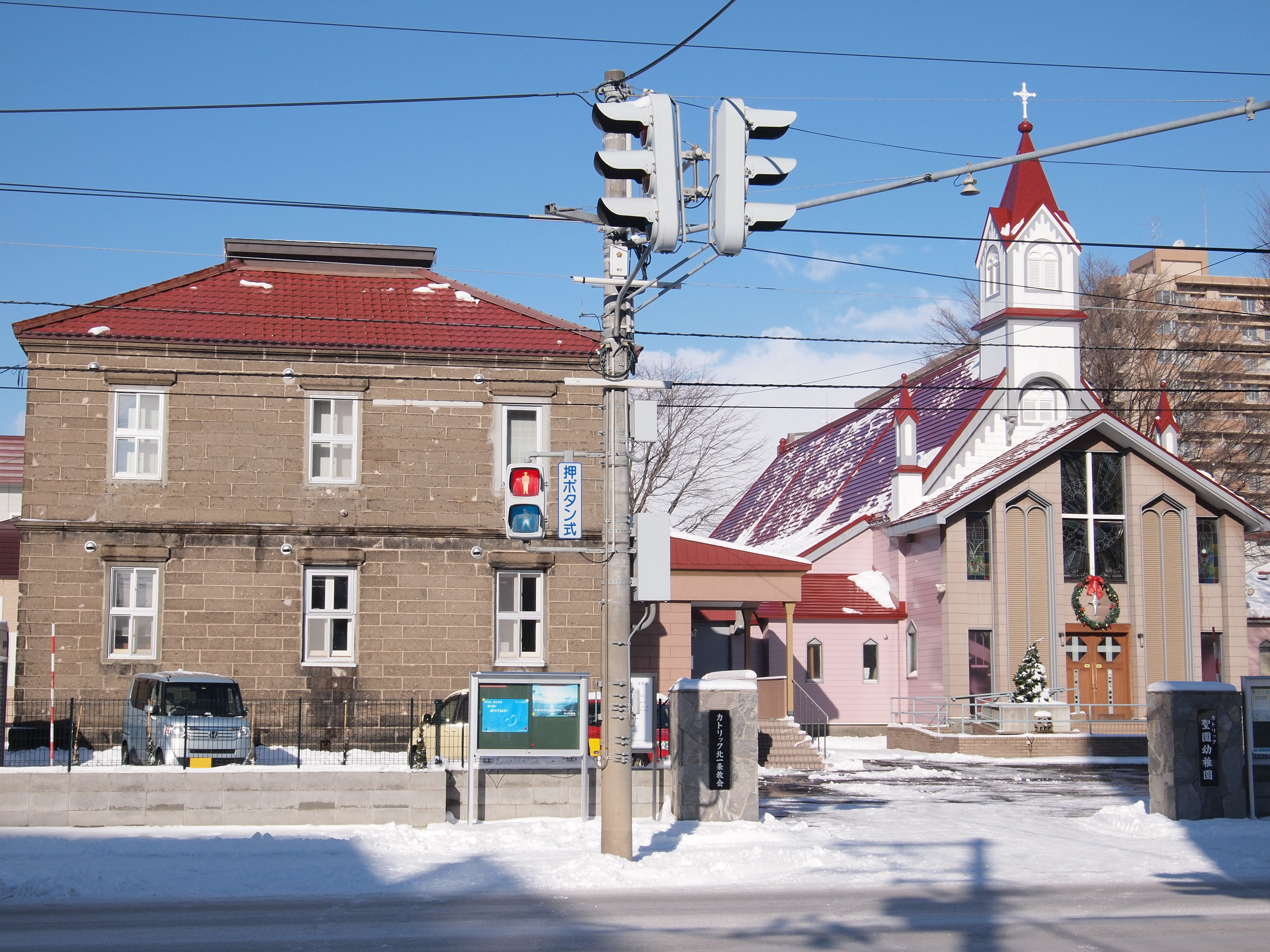
- Guardian Angels Cathedral
- 43°03′51″N 141°21′54″E
- Location: Sapporo
- Country: Japan
- Denomination: Catholic Church

The Guardian Angels Cathedral (Japanese: 守護の天使司教座聖堂) also called Kitaiciho Church is the cathedral of the Diocese of Sapporo in the city of Sapporo, Japan. The church follows the Roman rite and serves as the seat of the diocese, (Dioecesis Sapporensis; カトリック札幌司教区) which was raised to its current status by Pope Pius XII with the Bull "Iis Christi" in 1952.

It offers religious services in both Japanese and English and is under the pastoral responsibility of the Bishop Bernard Taiji Katsuya.

== See also ==
- Catholic Church in Japan
- Guardian Angel Cathedral
