= Diocese of Yokohama (Catholic) =

Roman Catholic diocese in Japan

Coordinates: 35°26′00″N 139°37′59″E

Diocese of Yokohama Dioecesis Yokohamaensis カトリック横浜教区
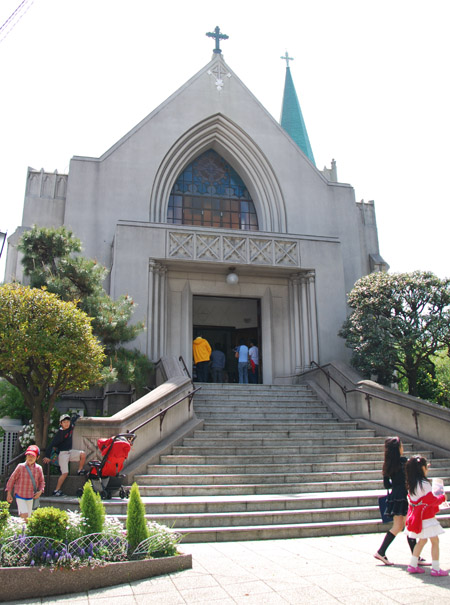
- Cathedral of Yokohama

Location
- Country: Japan
- Territory: Kanagawa, Shizuoka, Nagano, and Yamanashi
- Ecclesiastical province: Tokyo
- Metropolitan: Tokyo

Statistics
- Area: 28,246 km^{2} (10,906 sq mi)
- Population: Total; Catholics: (as of 2015); 15,763,428; 55,723 (0.4%)
- Parishes: 93

Information
- Sui iuris church: Latin Church
- Rite: Roman Rite
- Established: 9 November 1937
- Cathedral: Cathedral of the Sacred Heart in Yokohama
- Secular priests: 46 diocesan (and 54 religious)

Current leadership
- Pope: Leo XIV
- Bishop: Rafael Masahiro Umemura
- Metropolitan Archbishop: Tarcisio Isao Kikuchi

Map
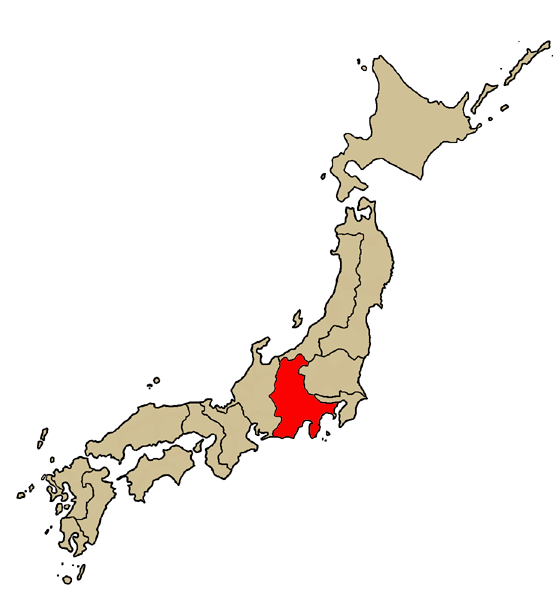

Website
- yokohama.catholic.jp

The Diocese of Yokohama (Latin: Dioecesis Yokohamaensis, Japanese: カトリック横浜教区) is a Latin Church diocese of the Catholic Church. Its cathedral is located in the city of Yokohama. It is a suffragan diocese of Roman Catholic Archdiocese of Tokyo in Japan and therefore in Tokyo's ecclesiastical province.

== History ==
There have been two dioceses in Yokohama. On January 5, 1846, the Apostolic Vicariate of Japan was established. This became the Apostolic Vicariate of Northern Japan in 1876 and then was suppressed in 1891 to establish the Archdiocese of Tokyo.

On November 11, 1937, the Diocese of Yokohama was erected out of territory of the Archdiocese of Tokyo. The new diocese covered eight prefectures of Japan: Kanagawa, Ibaraki, Tochigi, Gumma, Saitama, Yamanashi, Nagano and Shizuoka. On January 4, 1939, four of those prefectures – Saitama, Ibaraki, Tochigi and Gumma – were moved to the newly formed Apostolic Prefecture of Urawa, now the Roman Catholic Diocese of Saitama.

== Leadership ==
The Bishops of the diocese have been:

  - Bishop Rafael Masahiro Umemura (ラファエル梅村昌弘) (since 1999.03.16)
  - Cardinal Stephen Fumio Hamao (ステファノ濱尾文郎) (1979.10.30 – 1998.06.15)
  - Bishop Luke Katsusaburo Arai (ルカ荒井勝三郎) (1951.12.13 – 1979.10.30)
  - Bishop Thomas Asagoro Wakida (トマ脇田浅五郎) (1947.03.25 – 1951.07.05)
  - Cardinal Peter Tatsuo Doi (ペトロ土井辰雄) (Apostolic Administrator 1945 – 1947)
  - Archbishop Jean-Baptiste-Alexis Chambon (ジャン・アレキシス・ジャンボン), M.E.P. (1937.11.09 – 1940.09.18)

== See also ==
- Roman Catholicism in Japan

== Sources ==
- GCatholic.org
- Catholic Hierarchy
