= Archdiocese of Tokyo =

Roman Catholic archdiocese in Japan

Coordinates: 35°42′N 139°43′E

Archdiocese of Tokyo Archidioecesis Tokiensis カトリック東京大司教区
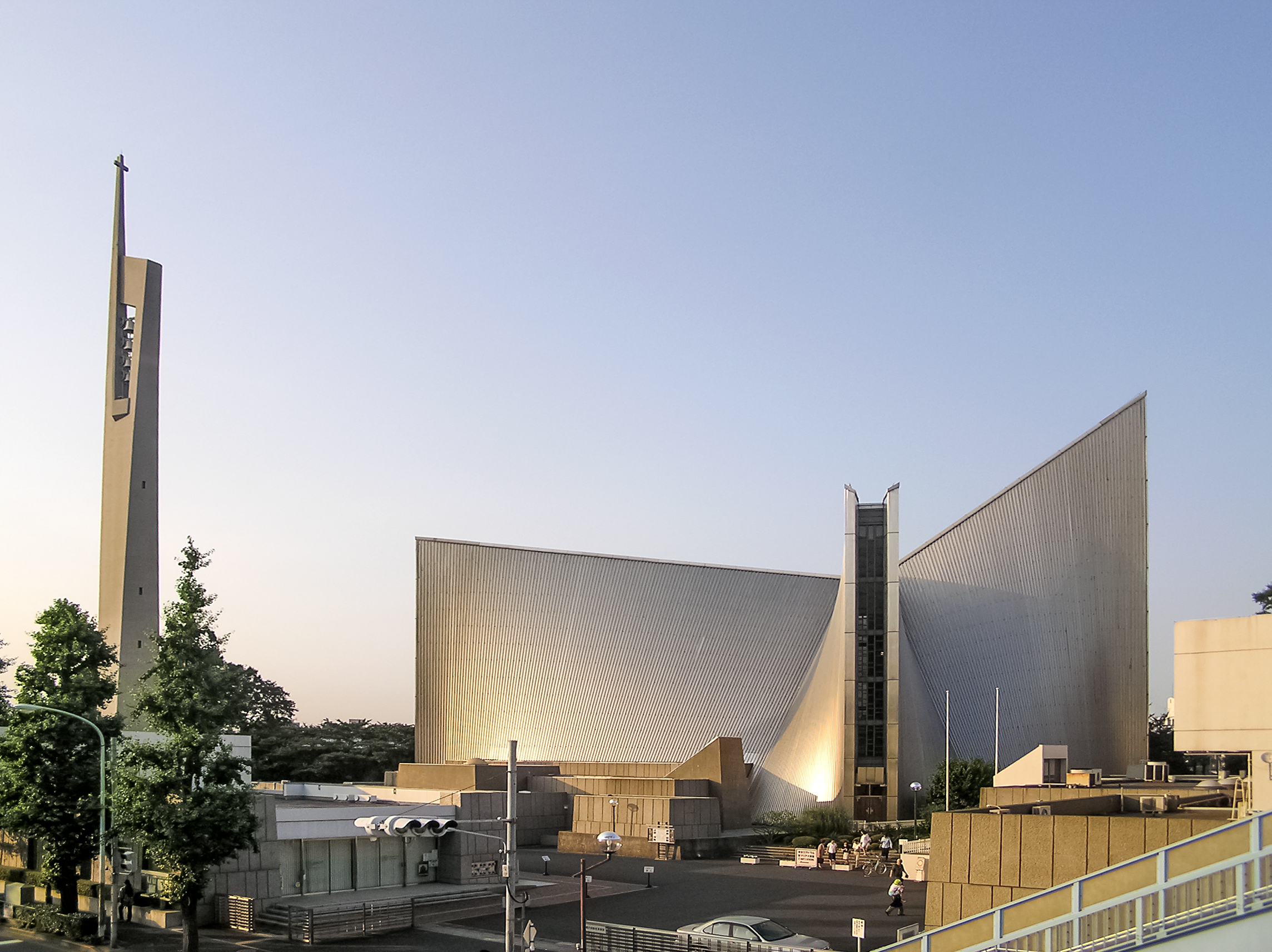
- St. Mary's Cathedral in Tokyo

Location
- Country: Japan
- Territory: Tokyo and Chiba
- Ecclesiastical province: Tokyo

Statistics
- Area: 7,316 km^{2} (2,825 sq mi)
- Population: Total; Catholics: (as of 2010); 19,200,258; 96,157 (0.5%)
- Parishes: 75

Information
- Sui iuris church: Latin Church
- Rite: Roman Rite
- Established: April 17, 1891
- Cathedral: St. Mary's Cathedral
- Secular priests: 76

Current leadership
- Pope: Leo XIV
- Metropolitan Archbishop: Tarcisio Isao Kikuchi, S.V.D.
- Suffragans: Roman Catholic Diocese of Niigata, Saitama, Sapporo, Sendai, and Yokohama
- Auxiliary Bishops: Andrea Lembo, P.I.M.E.
- Vicar General: Andrea Lembo, P.I.M.E.

Map
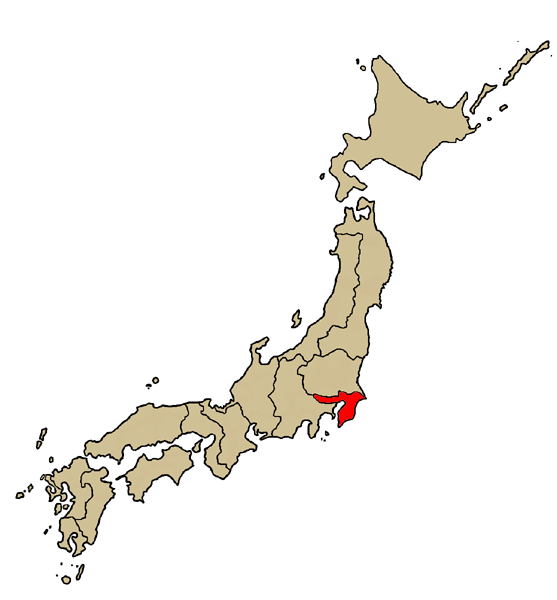

Website
- https://tokyo.catholic.jp/en/

The Metropolitan Archdiocese of Tokyo (Latin: Archidioecesis Tokiensis, Japanese: カトリック東京大司教区) is a Latin Church metropolitan archdiocese of the Catholic Church in Japan. It was erected as the Apostolic Vicariate of Japan by Pope Gregory XVI on 1 May 1846, and its name was later changed by Pope Pius IX to the Apostolic Vicariate of Northern Japan.

It was elevated to the Metropolitan Archdiocese of Tokyo by Pope Leo XIII on June 15, 1891, with the suffragan sees of Niigata, Saitama, Sapporo, Sendai, and Yokohama.

Tarcisio Isao Kikuchi, S.V.D., who served previously as Bishop of the Roman Catholic Diocese of Niigata, was appointed Archbishop of the Tokyo Archdiocese on October 25, 2017.

== History ==
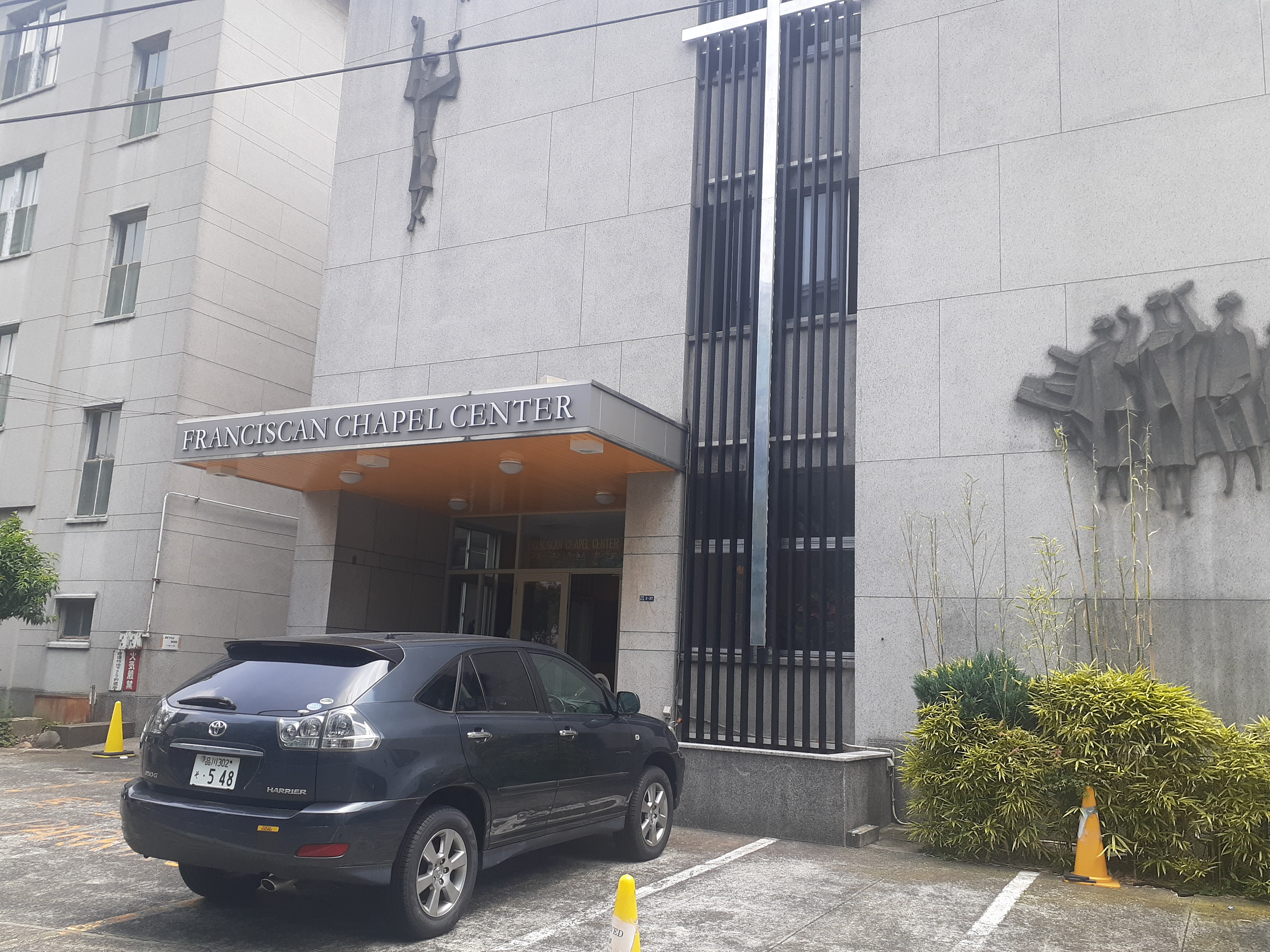
The Franciscan Chapel Center in Roppongi, in Metropolitan Tokyo, where Mass is celebrated in English

The evangelization of Japan started in 1549 with the arrival of Saint Francis Xavier and went on until 1587, when Toyotomi Hideyoshi issued an edict forbidding Christianity and ordering all missionaries to leave Japan. In the following years of persecution, also in Edo (now Tokyo), there were cases of martyrdom in 1612 and 1623.

On 1 May 1846, Vicariate Apostolic of Japan was erected, Pope Gregory XVI having indicated his intention to do this in a papal brief, Ex debito pastoralis, issued on 27 March that year.

After the "seclusion period", the first missionaries of the Paris Foreign Missions Society arrived in Japan in 1858, and were stationed in the three ports of Nagasaki, Yokohama and Hakodate.

On 22 May 1876, the apostolic vicariate was divided in two: the Apostolic Vicariate of Southern Japan, with its center in Nagasaki, and the Apostolic Vicariate of Northern Japan, with its center in Tokyo. Pierre Marie Osouf was the first Ordinary (Catholic Church) of the Apostolic Vicariate of Northern Japan.

On April 17, 1891, the Vicariate Apostolic of Northern Japan was divided into the Archdiocese of Tokyo and the Diocese of Hakodate. Pierre-Marie Osouf became the first Archbishop of Tokyo.

On August 13, 1912, the Archdiocese of Tokyo ceded the prefectures of Toyama, Fukui and Ishikawa to the newly established Prefecture Apostolic of Niigata, and on February 18, 1922, the prefectures of Aichi and Gifu were ceded to the newly established Prefecture Apostolic of Nagoya.

In November 1937, Tokyo was entrusted to Japanese clergy, and confined to Tokyo-to and the Chiba Prefecture. The remaining territory was detached to form the Diocese of Yokohama. The first Archbishop selected from among the Japanese clergy was Archbishop Peter Tatsu Doi.

== List of ordinaries ==
- Théodore-Augustin Forcade, MEP (1846 - 1852)
- C. Collin (1852 - 1854; not possessed)
- Bernard Petitjean, MEP (1866 - 1876)
- Pierre-Marie Osouf, MEP (1876 - 1906)
- Pierre-Xavier Mugabure, MEP (1906 - 1910)
- François Bonne, MEP (1910 - 1912)
- Jean-Pierre Rey, MEP (1912 - 1926)
- Jean-Baptiste-Alexis Chambon, MEP (1927 - 1937)
- (Cardinal) Peter Tatsuo Doi (1937 - 1970)
- (Cardinal) Peter Seiichi Shirayanagi (1970 - 2000)
- Peter Takeo Okada (2000 - 2017)
- (Cardinal) Tarcisio Isao Kikuchi (2017–present)

== See also ==
- Roman Catholicism in Japan
