= Clerics Regular of the Mother of God =

Roman Catholic religious order

- Ordo Clericorum Regularium Matris Dei
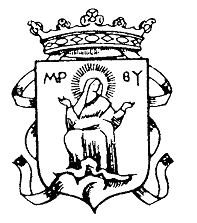
- Coat of arms

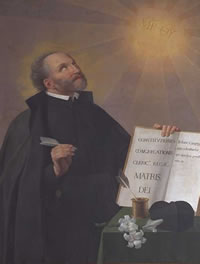
- John Leonardi, founder of the OMD
- Abbreviation: OMD
- Formation: September 1, 1574 (451 years ago)
- Founder: Saint John Leonardi, OMD
- Founded at: Lucca, Republic of Lucca
- Type: Religious order of clerics regular of pontifical right (for men)
- Headquarters: Santa Maria in Campitelli Rome, Italy
- Members: 110 members (72 priests) as of (2018)
- Rector General: Vincenzo Molinaro, OMD
- Parent organization: Catholic Church
- Website: ordinedellamadredidio.org

The Clerics Regular of the Mother of God (Latin: Ordo Clericorum Regularium Matris Dei; abbreviated OMD) is a religious order of clerics regular of pontifical right. Its priests are dedicated to education and pastoral care. The Order was founded by St. John Leonardi, who worked with this congregation to spread devotion to the Blessed Virgin Mary, as well as the Forty Hours devotion, and frequent reception of the Blessed Sacrament.

== History ==
Leonardi was born in 1541, the son of middle-class parents, at Diecimo (now within the comune of Borgo a Mozzano) in the Republic of Lucca. He was ordained on December 22, 1572.

Leonardi's Order may be said to have begun in 1574. Two or three young laymen, had gathered round him to submit themselves to his spiritual guidance and help him in the work of reform which he had begun even as a layman. Leonardi rented the Church of Santa Maria della Rosa in Lucca and, in a quarter close by, something like community life was started. It was here, when it became evident that his lay helpers were preparing for the priesthood and that something like a religious order was in process of formation, that a storm of persecution broke out against the devoted founder. The leaders of the Republic or Lucca seem to have had a real fear that a native religious order, if spread over Italy, would cause the affairs of the little state to become too well known to its neighbours. The persecution, however, was so effective and lasting, that Leonardi practically spent the rest of his life in banished from Lucca, only being now and again admitted by special decree of the Senate, unwillingly extracted under papal pressure. In 1580 Giovanni acquired secretly the ancient Church of Santa Maria Cortelandini (popularly known as Santa Maria Nera) which the Order holds to this day.

In 1583, the congregation was canonically erected at the instigation of Pope Gregory XIII by Alessandro Guidiccioni, Bishop of Lucca, and confirmed by the papal Brief of Clement VIII "Ex quo divina majestas", 13 October 1595. The congregation at this time only took simple vows of chastity, perseverance, and obedience, and was known as the Congregation of Clerics Secular of the Blessed Virgin.

In 1601, he obtained the Church of Santa Maria in Portico in Rome. In the same year, Cardinal Baronius became protector of the Order. Leonardi died in Rome 9 October 1609, aged 68, and was buried at Santa Maria in Portico, Rome.

The present church of the order in Rome, obtained in 1662, is Santa Maria in Campitelli (called also Santa Maria in Portico), which also served as the first titular church of the Cardinal of York. The body of the founder was moved to this church and lies there, under the altar of St John the Baptist. Leonardi was declared Venerable in 1701, beatified by Pope Pius IX in 1861, and canonized by Pope Pius XI on 17 April 1938. His feast day is celebrated on 9 October in the General Roman Calendar of the Catholic Church.

In 1614, Pope Paul V confided to the congregation the care of the so-called Pious Schools. It is in his Brief "Inter Pastoralis" that the congregation is first called "of the Mother of God", having until then been known by its original name of "Clerics Secular of the Blessed Virgin". The care of these schools being considered outside the scope of the congregation, it was relieved of their charge by the same pontiff in 1617.

It was not until 3 November 1621 that Pope Gregory XV, carrying out what was always in the founder's mind, erected the congregation into a religious order proper by permitting its members to take solemn vows, and it then became the Clerics Regular of the Mother of God.

Leonardi received many offers of churches during his life, but, hoping to reconcile with the governing body of the Republic, thought it better to refuse them. In all its history the Order has never had more than 15 churches. In 2008 it had eight, all of them in Italy. They include that of Santa Maria Corteorlandi in Lucca and Santa Maria in Campitelli in Rome.

In the sacristy of Santa Maria Cortelandini is preserved a large portion of a hairshirt of St. Thomas of Canterbury whose feast is celebrated there with considerable ceremony; in 1908 half of this relic was presented to the Benedictine Abbey of St. Thomas, Erdington, England. The former residence of the clerics, who kept a large boys' school until the suppression in 1867, became the public library of Lucca.

Two of the original companions of the founder, Cesare Franciotti and Giovanni Cioni, have been declared Venerable by the Catholic Church. The Order is known for numerous scholars and writers. Notable among them is Giovanni Domenico Mansi, editor of the "Councils" and a hundred other works.

The coat of arms of the Order are azure, representing Our Lady Assumed into Heaven; and its badge and seal the monogram of the Mother of God in Greek characters.
