= List of Catholic bishops in Japan =

Japan map showing each of the 15 Latin Church Dioceses

The following is a list of bishops of the Catholic Church in Japan.

The Catholic Church in Japan comprises 15 Latin Church dioceses led by bishops. No apostolic vicariates or territorial prelatures currently; all jurisdictions are diocesan. Japan lacks a military ordinariate.

== Organization ==
The Catholic Church in Japan is divided into three ecclesiastical provinces, each headed by a metropolitan archdiocese, under which several suffragan dioceses fall. All active and retired bishops — whether ordinary, auxiliary, or emeritus — are members of the Catholic Bishops' Conference of Japan (CBCJ). The Pope appoints all bishops, usually based on recommendations and with consultation from the papal nuncio to Japan.

=== Cardinals ===
As of August 2025, there are two active Japanese cardinal-archbishops:

- Cardinal Tarcisio Isao Kikuchi, S.V.D. – Metropolitan Archbishop of Tokyo
- Cardinal Thomas Aquino Manyo Maeda – Metropolitan Archbishop of Osaka–Takamatsu

== List of current bishops ==
| Episcopal see coat of arms | Episcopal see | Ordinary | Title | Episcopal coat of arms |
=== Ecclesiastical Province of Nagasaki ===
| | Archdiocese of Nagasaki | Peter Michiaki Nakamura | Archbishop of Nagasaki | |
| | Diocese of Fukuoka | Josep Maria Abella Batlle | Bishop of Fukuoka | |
| | Diocese of Kagoshima | Francis Xavier Hiroaki Nakano | Bishop of Kagoshima | |
| | Diocese of Naha | Wayne Francis Berndt, OFMCap | Bishop of Naha | |
| | Diocese of Oita | Sulpizio Shinzo Moriyama | Bishop of Oita | |
=== Ecclesiastical Province of Osaka-Takamatsu ===
| | Archdiocese of Osaka-Takamatsu | Cardinal Thomas Aquino Manyo Maeda | Archbishop of Osaka-Takamatsu | |
| | Archdiocese of Osaka-Takamatsu | Paul Toshihiro Sakai | Auxiliary Bishop of Osaka-Takamatsu | |
| | Diocese of Hiroshima | Alexis Mitsuru Shirahama, P.S.S | Bishop of Hiroshima | |
| | Diocese of Kyoto | Paul Yoshinao Otsuka | Bishop of Kyoto | |
| | Diocese of Nagoya | Michael Gorō Matsuura | Bishop of Nagoya | |
=== Ecclesiastical Province of Tokyo ===
| | Archdiocese of Tokyo | Cardinal Tarcisio Isao Kikuchi, S.V.D | Archbishop of Tokyo | |
| | Archdiocese of Tokyo | Andrea Lembo, P.I.M.E. | Auxiliary Bishop of Tokyo | |
| | Diocese of Niigata | Paul Daisuke Narui, S.V.D | Bishop of Niigata | |
| | Diocese of Saitama | Mario Michiaki Yamanouchi, SBD | Bishop of Saitama | |
| | Diocese of Sapporo | Bernard Taiji Katsuya | Bishop of Sapporo | |
| | Diocese of Sendai | Edgar C. Gacutan, C.I.C.M. | Bishop of Sendai | |
| | Diocese of Yokohama | Rafael Masahiro Umemura | Bishop of Yokohama | |

== See also ==
- Catholic Church in Japan
