= Archdiocese of Osaka-Takamatsu =

Latin Catholic territory in Japan

Coordinates: 34°40′43.71″N 135°31′39.18″E

Archdiocese of Osaka-Takamatsu Archidioecesis Osakensis-Takamatsuensis カトリック大阪高松大司教区
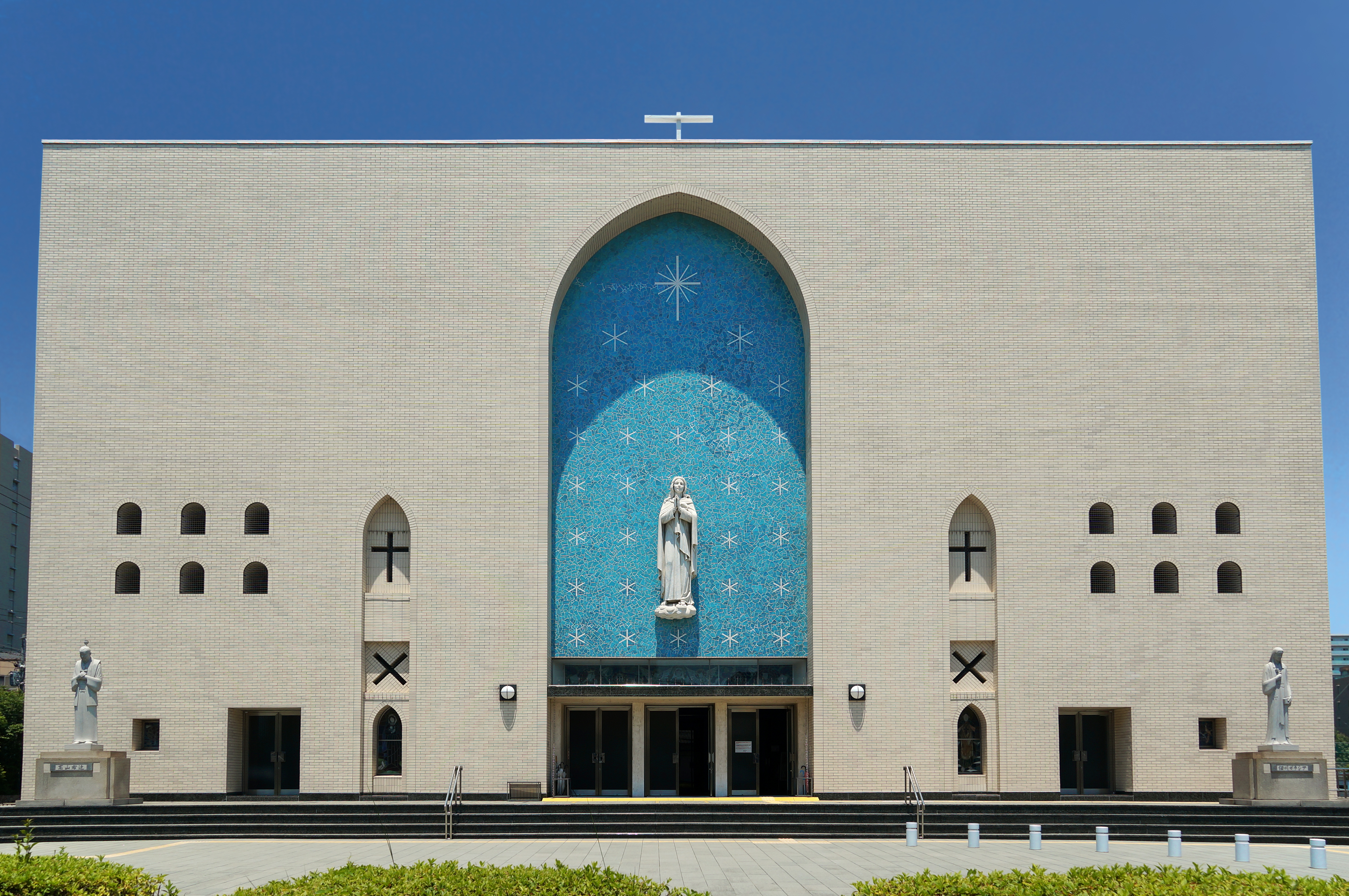

Location
- Country: Japan
- Territory: Osaka, Hyōgo, Wakayama, Kagawa, Ehime, Tokushima, and Kōchi
- Ecclesiastical province: Osaka

Statistics
- Area: 33,835 km^{2} (13,064 sq mi)
- Population: Total; Catholics: (as of 2023); 19,074,755; 51,413 (0.3%)

Information
- Denomination: Catholic Church
- Sui iuris church: Latin Church
- Rite: Roman Rite
- Cathedral: Saint Mary’s Cathedral in Osaka

Current leadership
- Pope: Leo XIV
- Metropolitan Archbishop: Thomas Aquino Manyo Maeda
- Auxiliary Bishops: Paul Toshihiro Sakai
- Bishops emeritus: Leo Jun Ikenaga Archbishop Emeritus (1997-2014)

Map
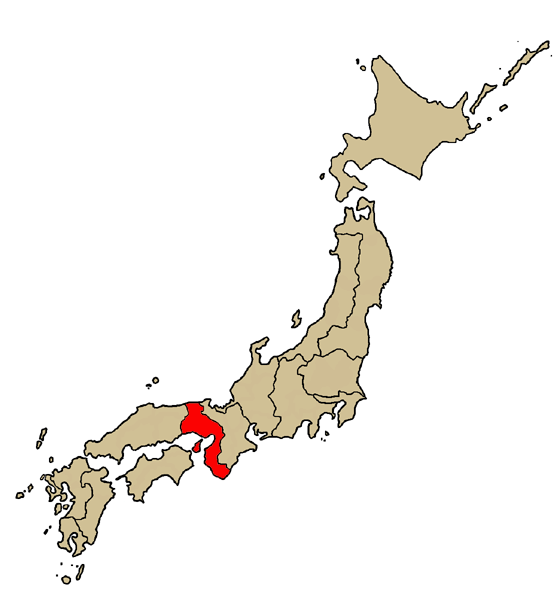

Website
- Website of the Archdiocese

The Archdiocese of Osaka-Takamatsu (Latin: Archidiocesis Osakensis-Takamatsuensis, Japanese: カトリック大阪高松大司教区, Katorikku Oosaka Daishikyouku) is a Latin Church ecclesiastical jurisdiction or archdiocese of the Catholic Church in Japan. Its episcopal see is the city of Osaka.

== History ==
- March 20, 1888: Established as Apostolic Vicariate of Central Japan from the Apostolic Vicariate of Southern Japan
- June 15, 1891: Promoted as Diocese of Osaka

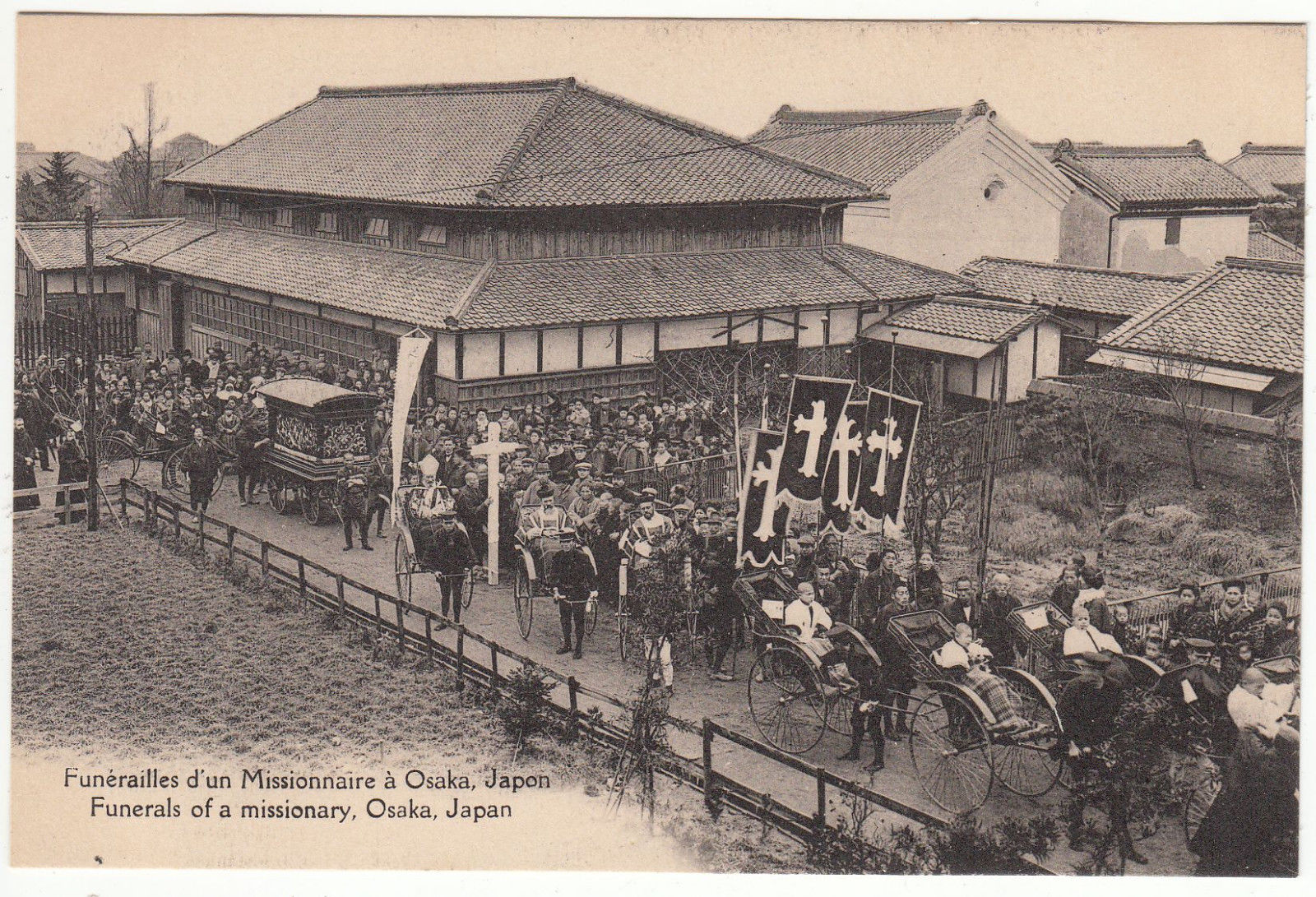
Funerals of a missionary, Osaka (around 1910)

- June 24, 1969: Promoted as Metropolitan Archdiocese of Osaka
- August 15, 2023: Incorporated with Diocese of Takamatsu to form Metropolitan Archdiocese of Osaka-Takamatsu.

== Leadership ==
- Archbishops of Osaka-Takamatsu
  - Cardinal Thomas Aquino Manyo Maeda (トマス・アクィナス前田万葉) (August 15, 2023 – present)
- Archbishops of Osaka
  - Cardinal Thomas Aquino Manyo Maeda (トマス・アクィナス前田万葉) (August 20, 2014 – August 15, 2023)
  - Archbishop Leo Jun Ikenaga (レオ池長潤), S.J. (May 10, 1997 – August 20, 2014)
  - Archbishop Paul Hisao Yasuda (パウロ安田久雄) (November 15, 1978 – May 10, 1997)
  - Cardinal Paul Yoshigoro Taguchi (パウロ田口芳五郎) (June 24, 1969 – February 23, 1978)
- Bishops of Osaka 大阪
  - Cardinal Paul Yoshigoro Taguchi (パウロ田口芳五郎) (1941.11.25 – 1969.06.24)
  - Bishop Jean-Baptiste Castanier (ジャン・バティスト・カスタニエ), M.E.P. (1918.07.06 – 1940.12.03)
  - Bishop Jules-Auguste Chatron (ジェル・オーグスト・シャトロン), M.E.P. (1896.07.22 – 1917.05.07)
  - Bishop Henri-Caprais Vasselon (アンリ・ヴァスロン), M.E.P. (1893.08.18 – 1896.03.07)
  - Bishop Félix-Nicolas-Joseph Midon (フェリックス・ニコラス・ミドン), M.E.P. (1891.06.15 – 1893.04.12)
- Vicars Apostolic of Central Japan
  - Bishop Félix-Nicolas-Joseph Midon (フェリックス・ニコラス・ミドン), M.E.P. (1888.03.23 – 1891.06.15)

== Suffragan dioceses ==
- Hiroshima 広島
- Kyoto 京都
- Nagoya 名古屋

== See also ==
- Catholic Church in Japan

== Sources ==
- GCatholic.org
- Catholic Hierarchy
- Diocese website
