= Diocese of Takamatsu =

Diocese of the Catholic Church

Coordinates: 34°21′N 134°03′E

Diocese of Takamatsu Dioecesis Takamatsuensis カトリック高松教区

Location
- Country: Japan
- Headquarters: Takamatsu

Statistics
- Area: 18,804 km^{2} (7,260 sq mi)
- Population: Total; Catholics: (as of 2022); 3,649,452; 4320 (0.1%)
- Parishes: 25

Information
- Denomination: Catholic Church
- Sui iuris church: Latin Church
- Rite: Roman Rite
- Established: 27 January 1904
- Dissolved: 15 August 2023; 2 years ago
- Archdiocese: Archdiocese of Osaka
- Cathedral: Sakuramachi Cathedral Church, Takamatsu

The Roman Catholic Diocese of Takamatsu (Latin: Takamatsuensis, Japanese: カトリック高松教区) is a former diocese that comprised the island of Shikoku, with its cathedral, Sakuramachi Cathedral Church, located in the city of Takamatsu. It included the Japanese prefectures of Kagawa, Ehime, Tokushima and Kōchi. On 15 August 2023, the diocese was incorporated into the Archdiocese of Osaka 大阪 to form the new Archdiocese of Osaka-Takamatsu.

== History ==
- 27 January 1904: Established as the Apostolic Prefecture of Shikoku from the Diocese of Osaka
- 13 September 1963: Promoted as the Diocese of Takamatsu
- 15 August 2023: Incorporated into the Archdiocese of Osaka-Takamatsu

== Leadership ==
Bishops of Takamatsu

- John the Apostle Eijiro Suwa (使徒ヨハネ諏訪榮治郎) (June 19, 2011 – September 26, 2022)
- Francis Xavier Osamu Mizobe (フランシスコ・ザビエル溝部脩), S.D.B. (May 14, 2004 – June 18, 2011)
- Joseph Satoshi Fukahori (ヨセフ深堀 敏) (July 7, 1977 – May 14, 2004)
- Franciscus Xaverius Eikichi Tanaka (フランシスコ・ザビエル田中英吉) (September 13, 1963 – 1977)

Prefects Apostolic of Shikoku

- Paul Yashigoro Taguchi (パウロ田口芳五郎) (November 25, 1941 – 1962)
- Fr. Thomas de la Hoz (トマス・デ・ラ・ホス), O.P. (Apostolic Administrator 1932 – 1935)

== See also ==
- Roman Catholicism in Japan
