= Peter Magoshiro Matsuoka =

His Excellency, The Most Reverend Peter Magoshiro Matsuoka
- Bishop of Nagoya
- Archdiocese: Osaka
- Appointed: December 13, 1945
- Retired: June 26, 1969
- Predecessor: Joseph Reiners SVD
- Successor: Aloysius Nobuo Soma
- Other posts: Prefect of Niigata; Titular Bishop of Belli

Orders
- Ordination: 10 February 1918 by Jean-Claude Combaz M.E.P.
- Consecration: June 3, 1962 by Domenico Enrici, Paul Aijirô Yamaguchi, and Paul Yoshigoro Taguchi

Personal details
- Born: March 3, 1887 Urakami, Japan
- Died: August 6, 1980 (aged 93) Nagoya, Japan

Peter Magoshiro Matsuoka (ペトロ松岡孫四郎, Matsuoka Magoshiro; March 03, 1887—August 08, 1980) was a Japanese prelate of the Roman Catholic Church. He served as Prefect of Nagoya from 1945, and consecrated Bishop in 1962 when the prefecture was elevated to diocese. He served as Bishop of Nagoya until his retirement in 1969.

== Biography ==
Magoshiro Matsuoka was born in Urakami (now part of the city of Nagasaki). Matsuoka's family practiced Christianity in secret, facing constant persecution and were exiled from their home in 1868 during the fourth Christian purge, escaping to Tsuwano, Shimane until 1873. Named for his grandfather who died in exile in Tsuwano, Matsuoka entered the Catholic school at Ōura in 1901 and was ordained to the priesthood on February 21, 1918.

Matsuoka first served as pastor of the Magome Church on Iojima Island, and was appointed to the Apostolic prefecture of Niigata and the Apostolic prefecture of Nagoya in 1941, where he served concurrently as Apostolic Administrator. In 1945, Matsuoka was elevated to prefect of both. Matsuoka resigned as prefect of Niigata in 1953 to concentrate on the construction of a new reinforced concrete cathedral (St. Peter and St. Paul Cathedral) and the Kogami School in Nagoya.

Upon Nagoya's elevation to Diocese, Matsuoka received his episcopal consecration on June 3, 1962 at the brand new St. Peter and St. Paul Cathedral from Apostolic Internuncio in Japan, Archbishop Domenico Enrici, with Archbishop Paul Aijirô Yamaguchi and Bishop Paul Yoshigoro Taguchi, as co-consecrators. Matsuoka participated in all four sessions of the Second Vatican Council.

Following his retirement from Nagoya in June 1969, he served as Titular Bishop of Belli and Bishop Emeritus of Nagoya.
