= Assumption of Mary Cathedral, Hiroshima =

Coordinates: 34.3956°N 132.4678°E

Assumption of Mary Cathedral
- 被昇天の聖母司教座聖堂
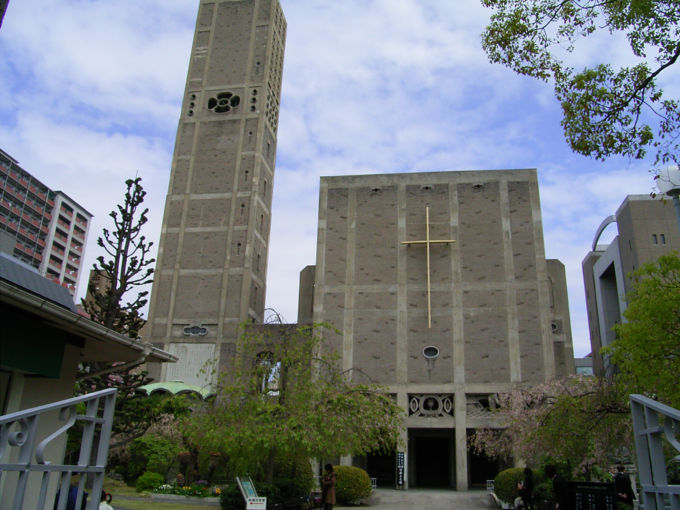
- Assumption of Mary Cathedral
- Location: Hiroshima
- Country: Japan
- Denomination: Roman Catholic Church

The Assumption of Mary Cathedral (Japanese: 被昇天の聖母司教座聖堂) also called Memorial Cathedral of World Peace (世界平和記念聖堂) is a religious building affiliated with the Catholic Church located in Hiroshima, Japan.

The church was designed by Togo Murano. It follows the Roman or Latin rite and serves as the principal church of the Diocese of Hiroshima (Dioecesis Hiroshimaensis カトリック広島教区) which was created in 1959 with the bull Qui arcano of Pope John XXIII.

Pope John Paul II visited the church on his tour of Japan in February 1981. It was built in tribute to the victims of war and the atomic bomb that was dropped on the city. Father Enomiya-Lassalle, who was exposed to the atomic bomb in Hiroshima, began construction in 1950 and it opened in 1954.

The Cathedral has been designated as an Important Cultural Property of Japan since July 5, 2006.

== See also ==
- Roman Catholicism in Japan
- Assumption of Mary

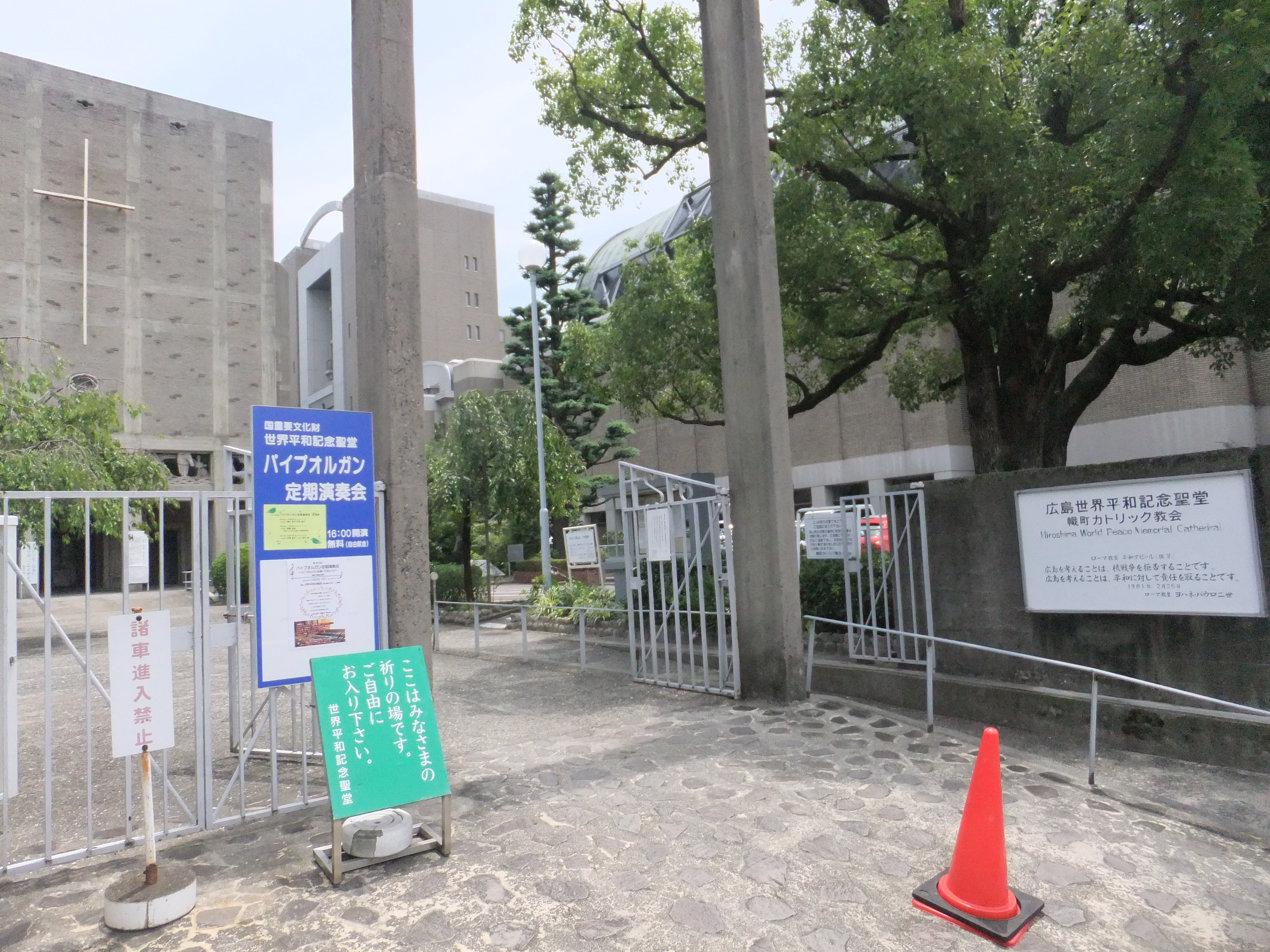
view of the surroundings
