= St. Francis Xavier Cathedral, Kyoto =

Coordinates: 35.0097°N 135.7694°E

St. Francis Xavier Cathedral
- 聖フランシスコ・デ・ザビエル司教座聖堂
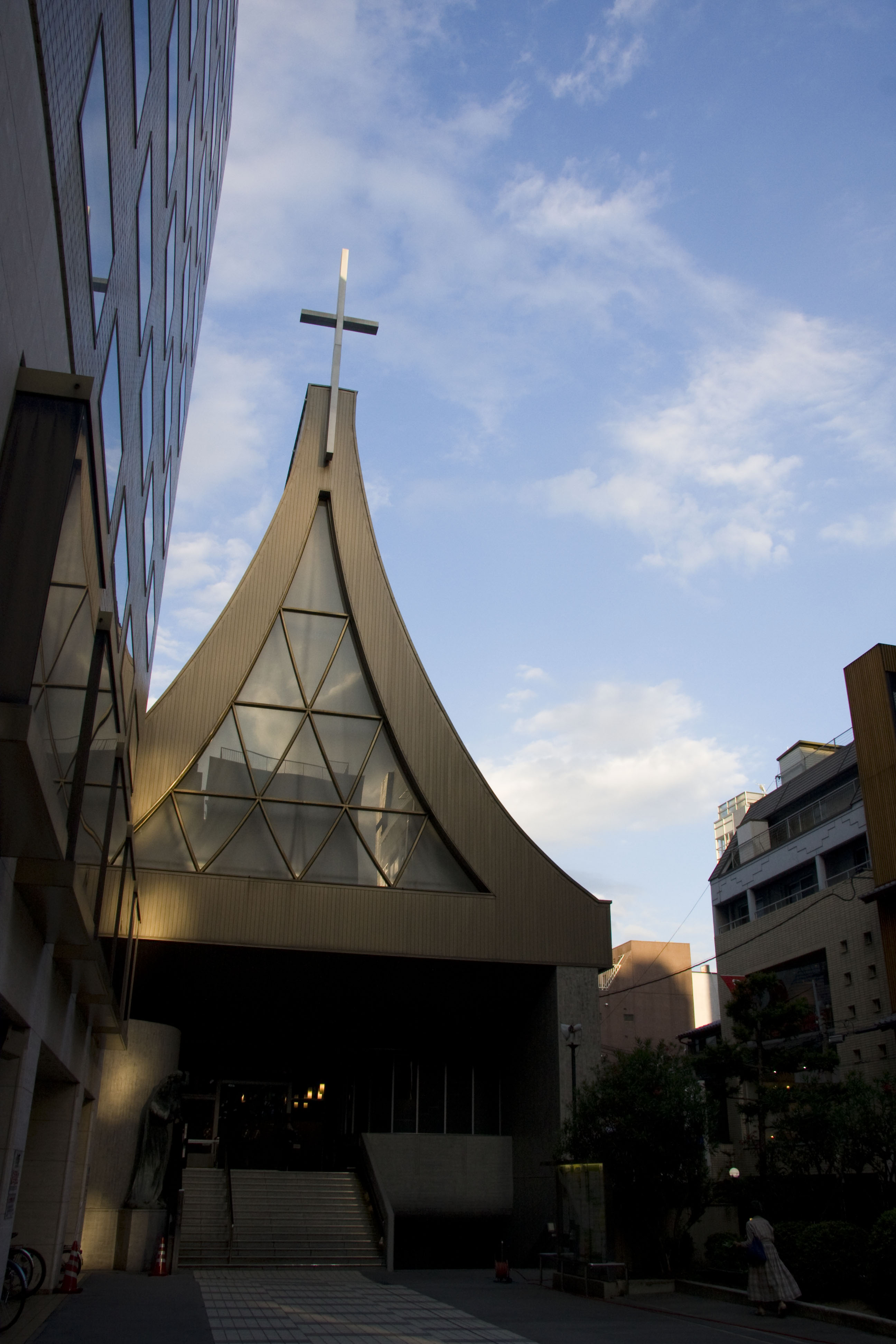
- St. Francis Xavier Cathedral
- Location: Kyoto
- Country: Japan
- Denomination: Roman Catholic Church
- Website: catholickawaramachi.kyoto

History
- Dedication: St. Francis Xavier

Architecture
- Completed: 1972

Administration
- Province: Osaka
- Diocese: Kyoto

The Cathedral of St. Francis Xavier (Japanese: 聖フランシスコ・デ・ザビエル司教座聖堂), also called Kawaramachi Church, is a parish of the Roman Rite of the Catholic Church in the city of Kyoto, and cathedral of the Roman Catholic Diocese of Kyoto in Japan.

It has served as the seat, or cathedra, of the Roman Catholic Bishop of Kyoto since the cathedral's construction was completed and the church dedicated in November 1972. The diocese (Dioecesis Kyotensis カトリック京都教区) had been erected in 1951 by Pope Pius XII through the papal bull "Inter supremi".

It is under the pastoral responsibility of the Bishop Paul Yoshinao Otsuka. Masses are offered in Japanese and English.

== See also ==
- Catholic Church in Japan
