= St. Peter and St. Paul Cathedral, Nagoya =

Roman Catholic cathedral in Japan

Coordinates: 35°10′22.24″N 136°55′26.00″E

Cathedral of St Peter and St Paul
- カトリック布池教会
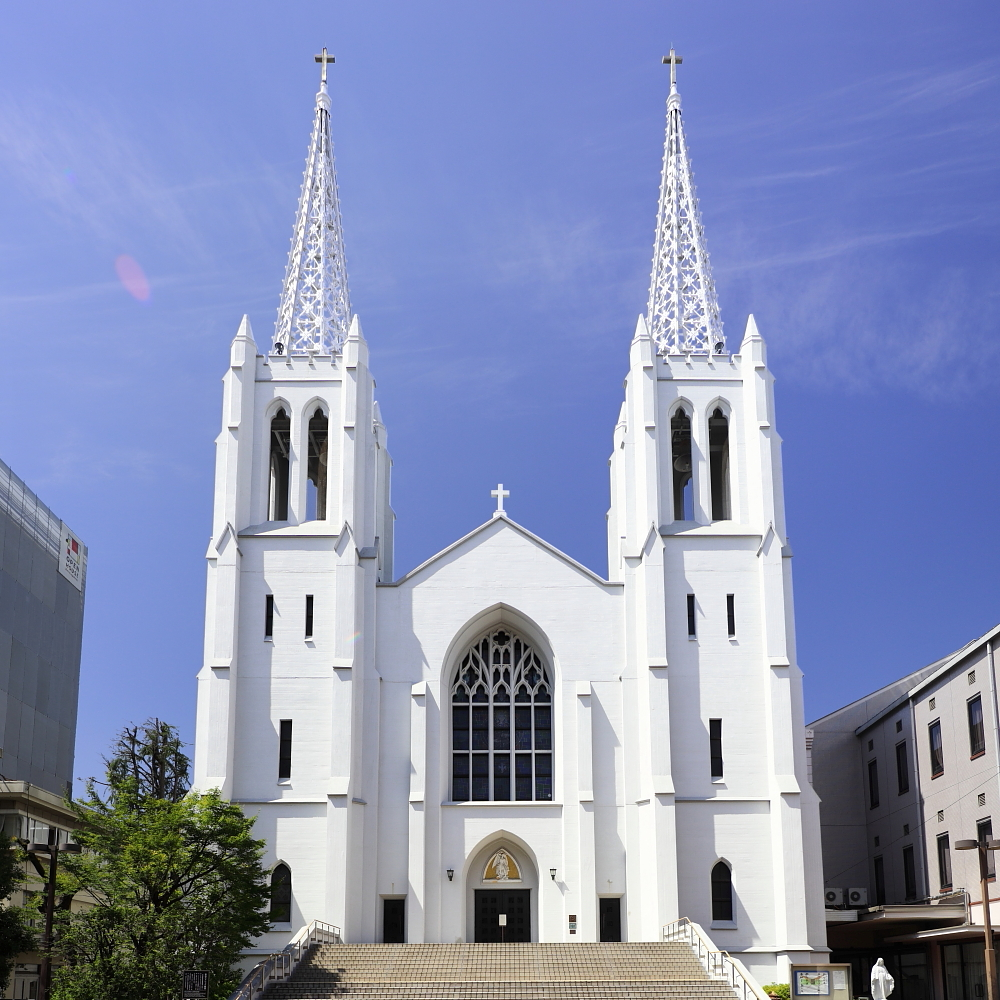
- Cathedral of St Peter and St Paul
- Location: 1-12-23 Aoi, Higashi-ku, Nagoya, Aichi
- Country: Japan
- Denomination: Catholic
- Tradition: Latin Rite
- Website: nunoike-nagoya-diocese.org

History
- Dedication: St Peter and St Paul
- Dedicated: 21 March 1962

Architecture
- Architect: Yamashita Toshiro Design Office
- Style: Gothic Revival

Administration
- Province: Osaka-Takamatsu
- Diocese: Nagoya
- Important Nagoya Landscape Tangible Cultural Property

Nunoike Church, officially the Cathedral of Saint Peter and Saint Paul, is the main cathedral of the Roman Catholic Diocese of Nagoya in central Japan.

Nagoya was first raised as an Apostolic prefecture in 1922 by Fr. Joseph Reiners, who led the congregation until his retirement in 1941. Peter Magoshiro Matsuoka was appointed to succeed him, and supervised Yamashita Sekkei in the construction of the modern new cathedral to meet the growning demand of the community. Upon the completion of the concrete Gothic revival cathedral and the elevation of the prefecture to diocese in 1962, Matsuoka was consecrated as its first bishop. Tall spires rise 50 meters above the ground over twin belfries on either side of the cathedral, and serve as a visual reference point around the Aoi neighborhood.

The diocese formerly operated the Nunoike Foreign Language College on the cathedral grounds for 36 years until its closure in 2023.

Located in the Higashi ward, the cathedral can be easily accessed from Chikusa Station on the JR Chūō Main Line and the Nagoya Higashiyama Line, and Kurumamichi Station on the Nagoya Sakura-dōri Line.

Masses are held in many languages, including English and Tagalog, catering to the expatriate community in Nagoya.
