= Fukahori =

Fukahori (written: 深堀) is a Japanese surname. Notable people with the surname include:

- Joseph Satoshi Fukahori (深堀 敏, 1924–2009), Japanese Roman Catholic bishop
- Shumpei Fukahori (深堀 隼平, born 1998), Japanese footballer
