= Diocese of Kyoto (Catholic) =

Roman Catholic diocese in Japan

Coordinates: 35°00′35″N 135°46′09″E

Diocese of Kyoto Dioecesis Kyotensis カトリック京都教区
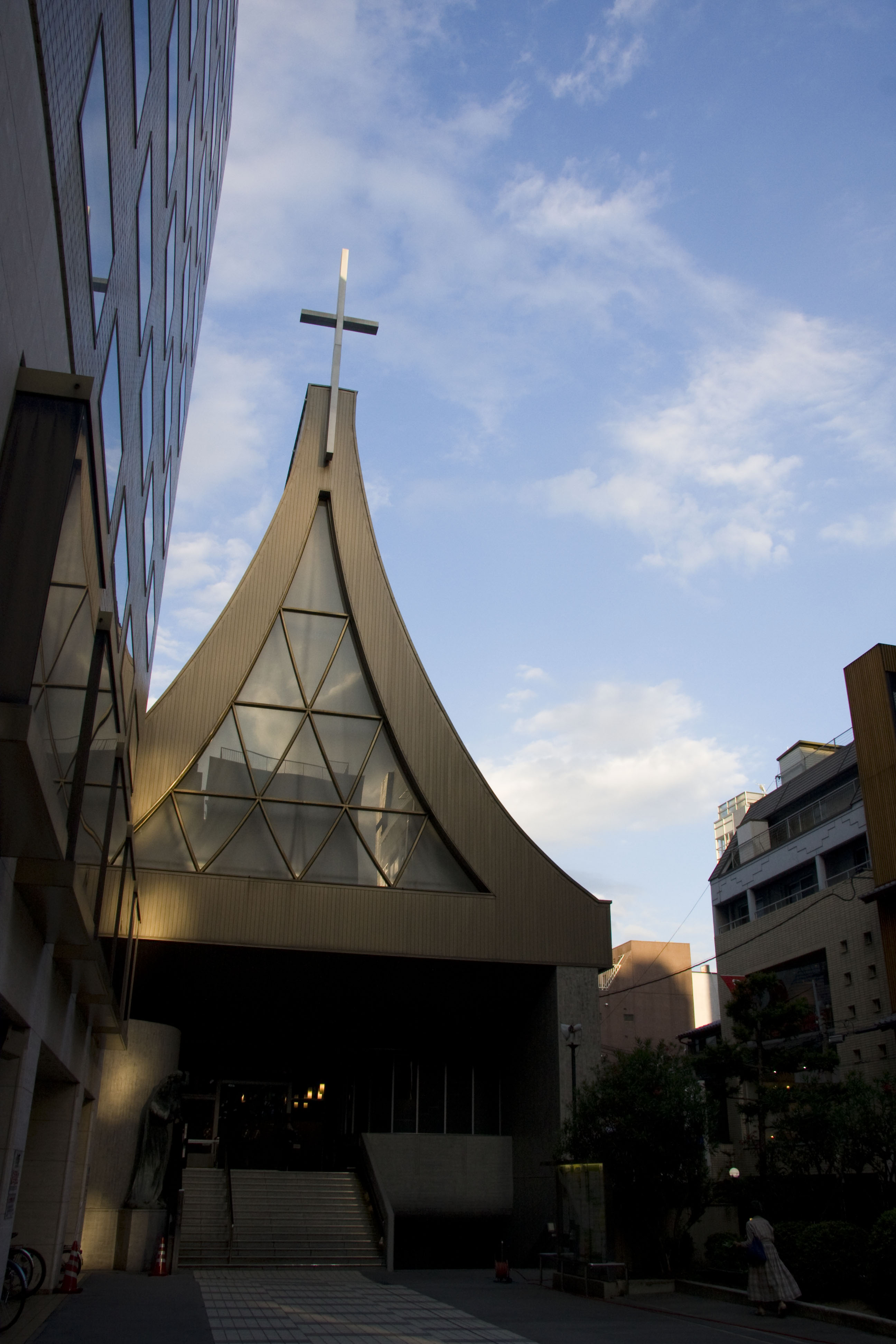
- St. Francis Xavier Cathedral, Kyoto

Location
- Country: Japan
- Territory: Kyoto, Shiga, Nara, and Mie
- Ecclesiastical province: Osaka 大阪
- Metropolitan: Osaka 大阪

Statistics
- Area: 18,095 km^{2} (6,987 sq mi)
- Population: Total; Catholics: (as of 2004); 7,314,195; 19,198 (0.3%)

Information
- Rite: Latin Rite
- Cathedral: St. Francis Xavier Cathedral, Kyoto

Current leadership
- Pope: Leo XIV
- Bishop: Paul Yoshinao Otsuka
- Metropolitan Archbishop: Thomas Aquino Manyo Maeda

Map
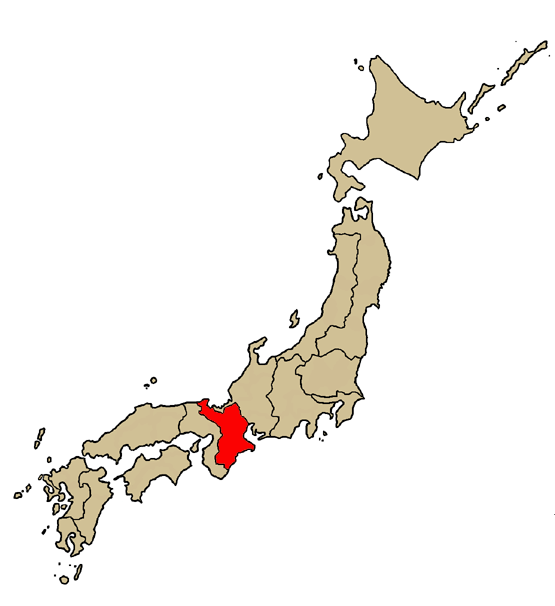

Website
- Website of the Diocese

The Diocese of Kyoto (Latin: Dioecesis Kyotensis, Japanese: カトリック京都教区) is a diocese of the Latin Church of the Catholic Church located in the city of Kyoto in the ecclesiastical province of Roman Catholic Archdiocese of Osaka in Japan.

On June 17, 1937, Apostolic Prefecture of Kyoto was established from the territory of the Diocese of Osaka.

On July 12, 1951, the apostolic prefecture was raised to a diocese by Pope Pius XII through the papal bull "Inter supremi".

The diocese's cathedral is the St. Francis Xavier Cathedral, Kyoto dedicated in November 1972.

== Leadership ==
- Bishops of Kyoto (Roman rite)
  - Bishop Paul Yoshinao Otsuka (パウロ大塚喜直) (since 1997.03.03)
  - Bishop Raymond Ken’ichi Tanaka (ライムンド田中健一) (1976.07.08 – 1997.03.03)
  - Bishop Paul Yoshiyuki Furuya (パウロ古屋義之) (1951.07.12 – 1976.07.08)
- Prefects Apostolic of Kyoto 京都 (Roman rite)
  - Bishop Paul Yoshiyuki Furuya (パウロ古屋義之) (1940 – 1951.07.12)
  - Bishop Patrick Joseph Byrne (パトリック・バーン / 방 파트리치오), M.M. (1937.03.19 – 1940.10.10)

== See also ==
- George Hirschboeck
- Roman Catholicism in Japan

== Sources ==
- GCatholic.org
- Catholic Hierarchy
- Diocese website
