= Francis Xavier Osamu Mizobe =

Francis Xavier Osamu Mizobe S.D.B.
- Bishop of Takamatsu
- Native name: フランシスコ・ザビエル溝部脩
- Church: Catholic Church
- Diocese: Diocese of Takamatsu
- In office: 14 May 2004 – 25 March 2011
- Predecessor: Joseph Satoshi Fukahori
- Successor: John Eijiro Suwa
- Previous post: Bishop of Sendai (2000-2004)

Orders
- Ordination: 9 February 1964
- Consecration: 9 September 2000 by Peter Takeo Okada

Personal details
- Born: 5 March 1935 Shingishu, Heianhoku Province, Chōsen, Empire of Japan
- Died: 29 February 2016 (aged 80)

Francis Xavier Osamu Mizobe (フランシスコ・ザビエル溝部脩), S.D.B. (5 March 1935 – 29 February 2016) was a Japanese Roman Catholic bishop.

Mizobe was ordained to the priesthood on 9 February 1964. He served as Bishop of the Roman Catholic Diocese of Sendai, Japan from 2000 to 2005 and as Bishop of the Roman Catholic Diocese of Takamatsu from 2005 to 2011.

== Notes ==
Catholic Church titles
Preceded by Joseph Satoshi Fukahori	Bishop of Takamatsu; 2005–2011	Succeeded by John the Apostle Eijiro Suwa
Preceded by Raymond Augustin Chihiro Sato	Bishop of Sendai; 2000–2005	Succeeded by Martin Tetsuo Hiraga
