= Caritas Japan =

Japanese Catholic charity

- カリタスジャパン
- Established: 1946
- Type: Nonprofit
- Location: Tokyo, Japan
- Coordinates: 35.6569°N 139.8167°E
- Origins: Catholic Social Teaching
- Region served: Japan, worldwide
- Fields: social work
- President: Daisuke Narui
- Affiliations: Caritas Asia, Caritas Internationalis
- Budget: ¥293,490,588 (2023)
- Website: www.caritas.jp

Caritas Japan (Japanese: カリタスジャパン) is a Catholic non-profit organisation of the Episcopal Conference of Japan. It was founded in 1946 and is a member of the global Caritas Internationalis confederation and of its regional structure Caritas Asia.

== Background and work ==
In 1946, after the end of World War II in Japan, the Japanese government established a committee to receive and distribute food, clothing, and others items received by the Licensed Agencies for Relief in Asia (LARA), an initiative of American welfare organisations. The Catholic Church of Japan was one of many Christian initiatives that partnered with public authorities to distributing relief items and part of this committee.

Two years later, in response to a letter by the Holy See on the coordination of the Catholic social programmes, the Japanese bishops decided to register the Caritas Society of Japan as an incorporate association. Its goal was to coordinate and guide the work at national level. In each diocese, a priest was appointed to be in charge of the social services provided. Caritas Japan in its current form was established in 1970.

The national office of Caritas Japan has five employees who coordinate the work of the 16 diocesan Caritas organisations. The organisation works with thousands of volunteers across the country.

In 2023, Caritas Japan funded the humanitarian relief efforts of the other members of the Caritas Internationalis confederation aronund the globe, including in South Sudan, Ukraine, Pakistan, Madagascar, Venezuela and Morocco, as well as development efforts abroad and activities implemented in Japan.

== Presidents ==
- 2007–2022: Tarcisio Isao Kikuchi
- 2022–present: Daisuke Narui
