= Edgar Gacutan =

Catholic prelate

The Most Reverend Edgar C. Gacutan C.I.C.M, D.D.
- Bishop of Sendai
- Archdiocese: Tokyo
- Diocese: Sendai
- Appointed: 8 December 2021
- Predecessor: Martin Tetsuo Hiraga
- Successor: Incumbent

Orders
- Ordination: 23 April 1994
- Consecration: 19 March 2022 by Tarcisio Isao Kikuchi

Personal details
- Born: 23 September 1964 (age 61) Enrile, Cagayan, Philippines
- Denomination: Roman Catholic
- Motto: 心も思いも一つに; Kokoro mo omoi mo hitotsu ni Cor unum et anima una ("One Heart and One Mind"); Acts of the Apostles 4:32
- Coat of arms

Edgar Cuntapay Gacutan is the bishop appointed by the Holy See to the Diocese of Sendai, Japan. He is the first Filipino bishop to be appointed in Japan.

== Early life and education ==
Edgar was born in Enrile, Cagayan, Philippines, on 23 September 1964. Edgar attended the St. Louis University in Baguio from 1981 to 1985 where he obtained a degree in philosophy. He would take theology at the Maryhill School of Theology in Manila from 1986 to 1989. He moved to Japan in February 1990 as a seminary student and after his internship in Japan. He returned to Manila to complete his theological studies.

== Career ==
=== Priesthood ===
On 23 April 1994, Gacutan was ordained a priest for the Congregation of the Immaculate Heart of Mary. After his ordination, he was sent back to Japan. He served as an assistant pastor in Kongo church, Osaka. He was part of the team ministry in Osaka for six years. He was appointed superior of the Japanese CICM Province in 2004 and served the role until 2012.

From January 2014 to March 2017, Gacutan was assigned in Sendai and dealt with the victims of the 2011 Tōhoku earthquake and tsunami as part of his missionary work.

Gacutan would then be assigned to the Matsubara Catholic Church in Setagaya ward in Tokyo.

=== Episcopate ===
Gacutan was appointed bishop of the Roman Catholic Diocese of Sendai by Pope Francis on 8 December 2021 becoming the first Filipino to become a bishop for Japan. He was consecrated by Tarcisio Isao Kikuchi on 19 March 2022.

Styles of Edgar Gacutan
- Reference style: The Most Reverend
- Spoken style: Your Excellency
- Religious style: Bishop
