= Thomas Aquino Manyo Maeda =

Japanese Catholic prelate (born 1949)

His Eminence Thomas Aquino Manyo Maeda
- Cardinal, Archbishop of Osaka-Takamatsu
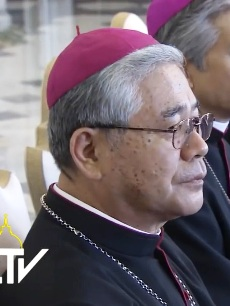
- Maeda in March 2015
- Native name: 前田万葉
- Church: Catholic
- Archdiocese: Osaka-Takamatsu
- See: Osaka-Takamatsu
- Appointed: 15 August 2023
- Predecessor: Office established
- Other posts: Vice-President of the Japanese Episcopal Conference (2016-); Cardinal-Priest of Santa Pudenziana (2018-)
- Previous posts: Bishop of Hiroshima (2011-14); Archbishop of Osaka (2014-23)

Orders
- Ordination: 19 March 1975
- Consecration: 23 September 2011 by Joseph Atsumi Misue
- Created cardinal: 28 June 2018 by Pope Francis
- Rank: Cardinal-Priest

Personal details
- Born: Thomas Aquino Manyo Maeda; 3 March 1949 (age 77) Tsuwasaki, Kami Goto, Japan
- Motto: Non ministrari sed ministrare (Not to be served, but to serve) (仕えられるためではなく、仕えるために)
- Coat of arms: Thomas Aquino Manyo Maeda's coat of arms

Ordination history of Thomas Aquino Manyo Maeda
History
Priestly ordination
- Ordained by: Joseph Asajiro Satowaki (Roman Catholic Archdiocese of Nagasaki)
Episcopal consecration
- Principal consecrator: Joseph Atsumi Misue (Bishop-Emeritus of Hiroshima)
- Co-consecrators: Leo Jun Ikenaga (Roman Catholic Archdiocese of Osaka); Joseph Mitsuaki Takami (Roman Catholic Archdiocese of Nagasaki)
Cardinalate
- Elevated by: Pope Francis
Episcopal succession
Bishops consecrated by Thomas Aquino Manyo Maeda as principal consecrator
- Alexis Mitsuru Shirahama: 19 September 2016
- Josep Maria Abella Batlle: 16 July 2018
- Paul Toshihiro Sakai: 16 July 2018

Thomas Aquino Manyo Maeda (Japanese: 前田万葉, Hepburn: Maeda Manyō) (born 3 March 1949) is a Japanese Catholic prelate who has served as Archbishop of Osaka-Takamatsu since 2023. He was previously Archbishop of Osaka from 2014 to 2023 and Bishop of Hiroshima from 2011 to 2014. Pope Francis elevated him to the cardinalate on 28 June 2018.

== Early life and career ==
Maeda Manyō was born in Tsuwasaki, Kami-Goto, in the prefecture of Nagasaki on 3 March 1949. He studied at the Liceo Nanzan of Nagasaki and entered the Major Seminary Saint Sulpice in Fukuoka. He was ordained on 19 March 1975.

He was Secretary General of the Catholic Bishops' Conference of Japan from 2006 to 2011.

== Episcopal career ==
On 13 June 2011, Pope Benedict XVI appointed him Bishop of Hiroshima and he was consecrated a bishop on 23 September 2011. He participated in the peace movement in Hiroshima and campaigned for the beatification of those called "hidden Christians", 3,400 Nagasaki Christians—more than 600 died—exiled to scattered locations throughout Japan until the middle of the nineteenth century by the Japanese government.

On 20 August 2014, Pope Francis appointed him Archbishop of Osaka.

Since 2016, he has been Vice-President of the Japanese Episcopal Conference.

Pope Francis made Maeda a cardinal on 28 June 2018, assigning him the titular church of Santa Pudenziana.

On 15 August 2023, Maeda was named Archbishop of the newly erected Archdiocese of Osaka-Takamatsu.

Maeda participated as a cardinal elector in the 2025 papal conclave that elected Pope Leo XIV.

== Personal life ==
He is a master of haiku, the Japanese short form poetic style, and often incorporates them into his sermons and other writing.

== See also ==
- Cardinals created by Francis
- Catholic Church in Japan

Catholic Church titles
Preceded by Joseph Atsumi Misue	Bishop of Hiroshima; 23 September 2011 – 20 August 2014	Succeeded by Alexis Mitsuru Shirahama
Preceded by Leo Jun Ikenaga	Archbishop of Osaka; 20 August 2014 – present	Incumbent
Preceded by Joachim Meisner	Cardinal-Priest of Santa Pudenziana; 28 June 2018 – present	Incumbent
