= Joseph Satoshi Fukahori =

- Bishop of Takamatsu
- Native name: 深堀敏
- Church: Catholic Church
- Diocese: Diocese of Takamatsu
- In office: 7 July 1977 – 14 May 2004
- Predecessor: Franciscus Xaverius Eikichi Tanaka
- Successor: Francis Xavier Osamu Mizobe

Orders
- Ordination: 22 December 1951
- Consecration: 23 September 1977 by Paul Yoshigoro Taguchi

Personal details
- Born: 8 October 1924 Nagasaki, Nagasaki Prefecture, Empire of Japan
- Died: 24 September 2009 (aged 84)

Joseph Satoshi Fukahori (深堀 敏, Fukahori Satoshi; 8 October 1924 - 24 September 2009) was a Japanese Roman Catholic prelate, who had served as a bishop of the Roman Catholic Diocese of Takamatsu from his appointment on July 7, 1977, and his retirement on May 14, 2004.

Fukahori was born in Nagasaki, Japan. He was ordained a Catholic priest on December 22, 1951. He died on September 24, 2009, at the age of 85.
