= Hugo Enomiya-Lassalle =

German Jesuit priest

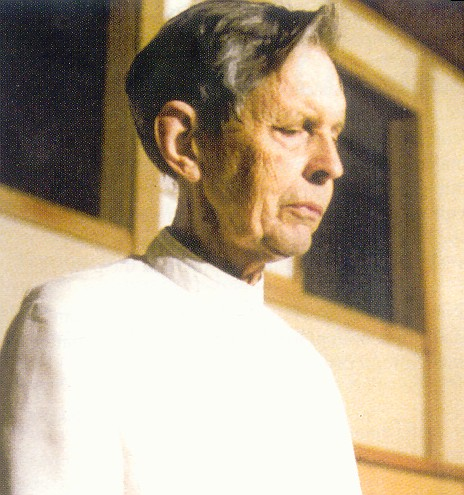
Father Hugo Enomiya-Lassalle

Hugo Makibi Enomiya-Lassalle (11 November 1898 in Gut Externbrock near Nieheim, Westphalia – 7 July 1990 in Münster, Westphalia) was a German Jesuit priest and one of the foremost teachers to embrace both Roman Catholic Christianity and Zen Buddhism.

== Biography ==
Hugo Lassalle passed his school days from 1911 to 1916 at the Gymnasium Petrinum in Brilon in 1917. Because of an injury in the First World War, Hugo Lassalle was admitted to the military hospital of Brilon in 1917. Enomiya-Lassalle joined the Society of Jesus on 25 April 1919. At the end of the usual Jesuit spiritual and academic training he was ordained priest on 28 August 1927.

He travelled to Japan as a missionary in 1929 and became interested in that country's Buddhist practices. In 1940, he became the vicar of Hiroshima, and on 6 August 1945 he was critically wounded by the nuclear blast in that city. Shortly thereafter, he returned to Germany.

In September 1946, he had an audience with Pope Pius XII, in which he revealed his plan to build in Hiroshima a cathedral dedicated to the idea of world peace. Designed by Japanese architect Togo Murano, construction on the cathedral began in 1950 and on 6 August 1954, the Memorial Cathedral for World Peace (ja) was dedicated.

In 1956, Enomiya-Lassalle began studying Zen with Harada Daiun Sogaku. In 1958, he published Zen: A Way to Enlightenment.

Following Harada's death in 1961, Enomiya-Lassalle became an apprentice of one of Harada's students, Yamada Kōun. Yamada was enthusiastic about the possibilities of Zen as a Christian practice, believing that "Zen would become an important stream in the Catholic Church one day". With Enomiya-Lassalle's active assistance, he attracted a number of Catholic priests and nuns as students. In the late 1960s, Enomiya-Lasalle was certified as a teacher in Yamada's Sanbo Kyodan sect and given the title roshi (Zen master), while professing his continued belief in Christianity. After 1968, Enomiya-Lassalle spent much of his time in Europe leading Zen retreats and encouraging Zen practice among Christians. His books influenced symphony conductor Herbert von Karajan to study Zen and incorporate a Zen mindset into his conducting.

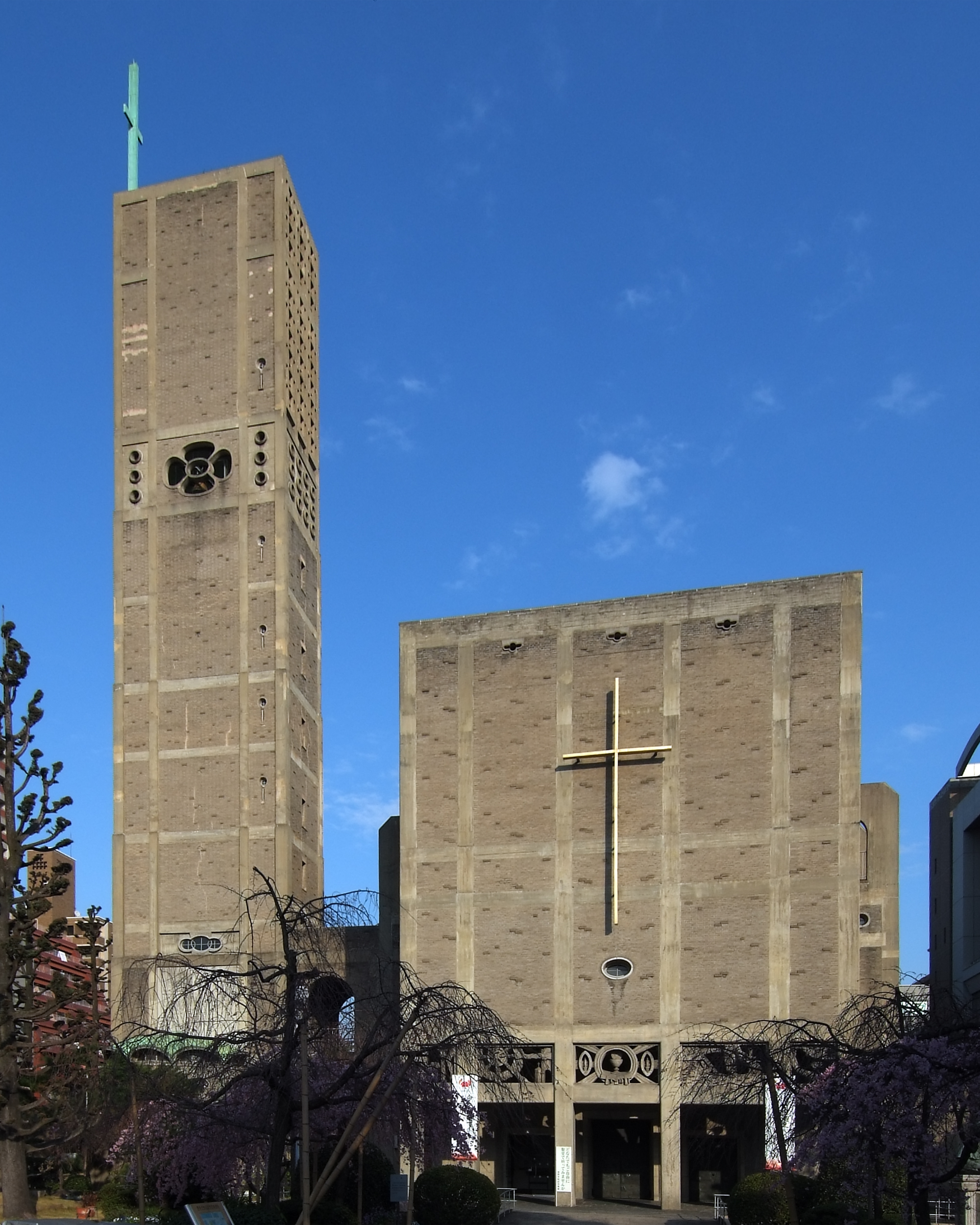
Memorial Cathedral for World Peace, at Naka-ku Hiroshima, Japan, design by Togo Murano in 1954.

== Bibliography ==
- Zen: Way to Enlightenment (1964)
- Zen Meditation for Christians (1974)
- Living the New Consciousness (1984)
- The Practice of Zen Meditation, (1987, Thorsons).

== See also ==
- Heinrich Dumoulin
- Hubert Schiffer
