= Enrile =

Enrile is a surname. Notable people with the surname include:

- Arturo Enrile (1940–1998), Filipino politician, cousin of Juan
- Jack Enrile (born 1958), Filipino politician, son of Juan
- Joaquín Ezpeleta Enrile (1788–?), Spanish politician and army general
- Juan Ponce Enrile (1924–2025), Filipino politician and lawyer
- Pasqual Enrile y Alcedo (1772–1836), Spanish governor-general of the Philippines
- Ronjay Enrile (born 1982), Filipino basketball player
- Sally Ponce Enrile, Filipino politician, wife of Jack
