= Joseph Atsumi Misue =

Japanese bishop

- Bishop of Hiroshima
- In office: 1985–2011

Orders
- Ordination: 1963

Personal details
- Born: April 24, 1936
- Died: June 28, 2016 (aged 80)
- Denomination: Roman Catholic

Joseph Atsumi Misue (24 April 1936 – 28 June 2016) was a Japanese Roman Catholic bishop.

Ordained to the priesthood in 1963, Misue served as bishop of the Roman Catholic Diocese of Hiroshima, Japan, from 1985 to 2011.
