= Paul Hisao Yasuda =

His Excellency Paul Hisao Yasuda
- Archbishop Emeritus of Osaka
- Church: Roman Catholic Church
- See: Archidocese of Osaka
- In office: 1978–1997
- Predecessor: Paul Yoshigoro Cardinal Taguchi
- Successor: Leo Jun Ikenaga
- Previous post: Auxiliary Bishop of Osaka (1970-1978)

Orders
- Ordination: 21 May 1955
- Consecration: 21 March 1970 by Bruno Wüstenberg
- Rank: Archbishop

Personal details
- Born: December 20, 1921 Kurume, Japan
- Died: April 23, 2016 (aged 94)

Paul Hisao Yasuda (Japanese: パウロ 安田 久雄, Hepburn: Pauro Yasuda Hisao; December 20, 1921 – April 23, 2016) was a Japanese prelate of the Roman Catholic Church.

Yasuda was born in Kurume, southwestern Japan, and was ordained a priest on 21 May 1955. He was appointed auxiliary bishop of the Archdiocese of Osaka on February 5, 1970 as well as titular bishop of Tucci and was consecrated bishop on 21 March 1970. Yasuda was appointed archbishop of the Archdiocese of Osaka on November 15, 1978, where he served until his retirement on May 10, 1997. He died in April 2016 at the age of 94.
