= Diocese of Nagoya =

Roman Catholic diocese in Japan

Coordinates: 35°10′22.24″N 136°55′26.00″E

Diocese of Nagoya Dioecesis Nagoyaensis カトリック名古屋教区
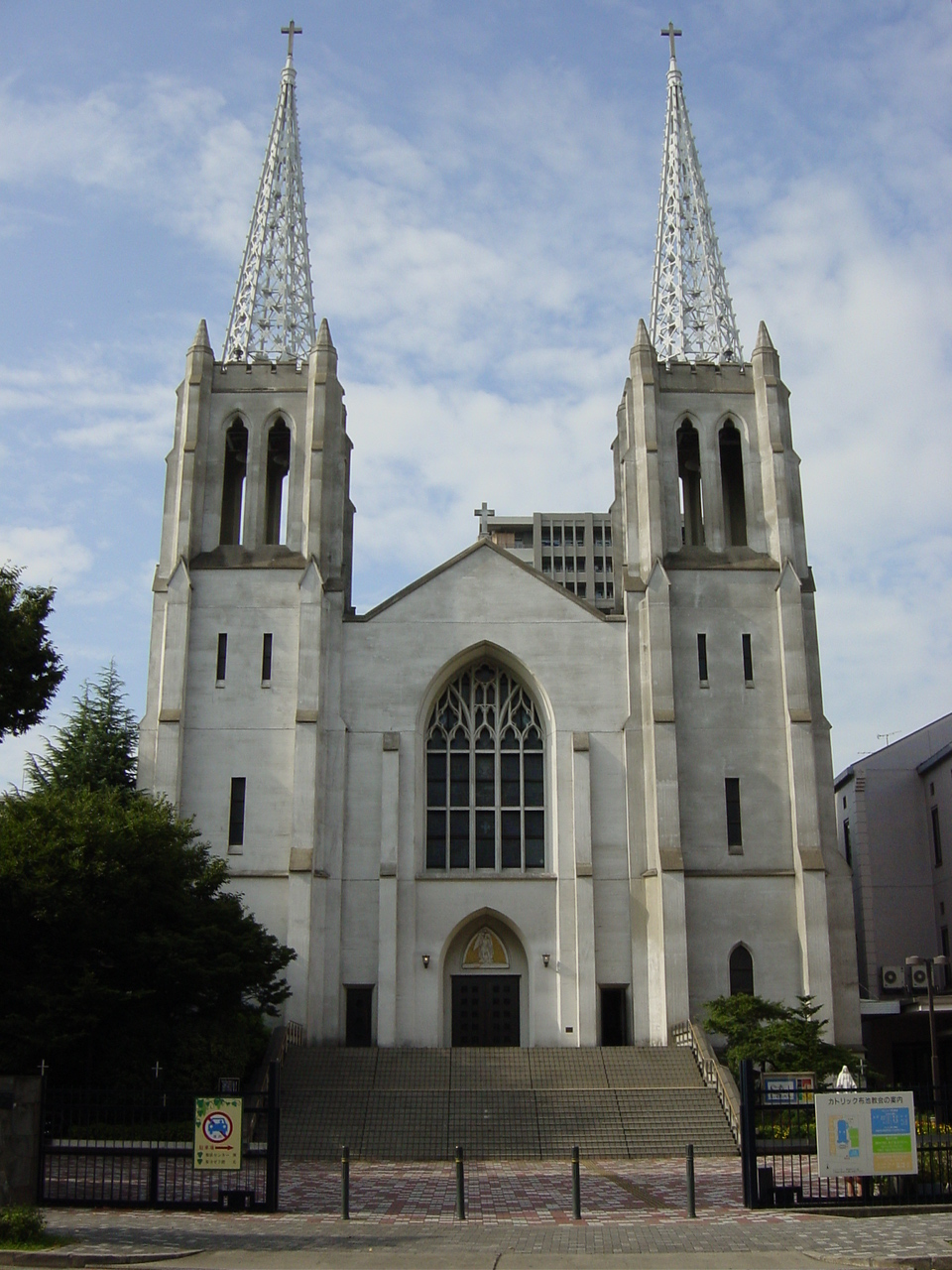
- Cathedral of St Peter and St Paul aka the Nunoike Church

Location
- Country: Japan
- Territory: Aichi, Ishikawa, Toyama, Gifu, and Fukui
- Ecclesiastical province: Osaka
- Metropolitan: Osaka

Statistics
- Area: 28,486 km^{2} (10,999 sq mi)
- Population: Total; Catholics: (as of 2004); 12,409,860; 25,380 (0.2%)

Information
- Rite: Latin Rite
- Cathedral: Cathedral of St Peter and St Paul in Nagoya

Current leadership
- Pope: Leo XIV
- Bishop: Michael Gorō Matsuura
- Metropolitan Archbishop: Thomas Aquino Manyo Maeda
- Bishops emeritus: Augustinus Jun-ichi Nomura

Map
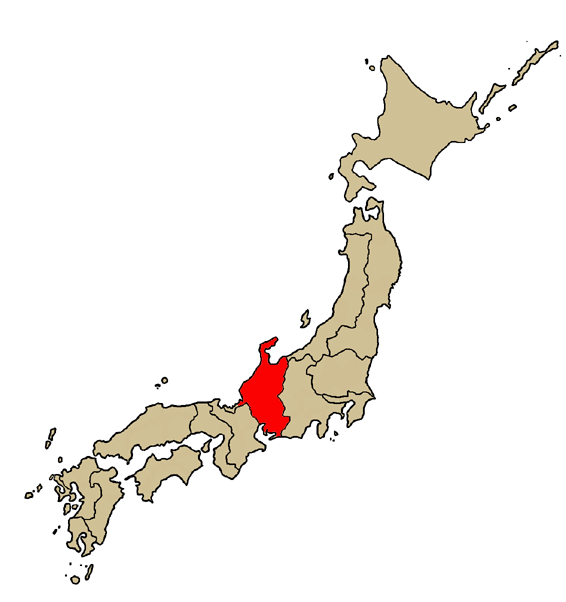

Website
- https://www.nagoya.catholic.jp/

The Diocese of Nagoya (Latin: Dioecesis Nagoyaensis, Japanese: カトリック名古屋教区) is a Latin Church diocese of the Catholic Church that is centered in the city of Nagoya and is part of the ecclesiastical province of Osaka in Japan.

== History ==
On February 18, 1922, the Apostolic Prefecture of Nagoya was formed out of the Apostolic Prefecture of Niigata and Metropolitan Archdiocese of Tōkyō. Forty years later, on April 16, 1962, the apostolic prefecture was elevated to diocese.

== Leadership ==
The current bishop is Michael Gorō Matsuura who was formerly an auxiliary bishop of the Archdiocese of Osaka, and the titular bishop of Sfasferia. He was appointed by Pope Francis on Sunday, March 29, 2015, succeeding Augustinus Jun-ichi Nomura.

- Prefects Apostolic of Nagoya:
  - Fr. Joseph Reiners (ヨゼフ・ライネルス), S.V.D. (1922.02.18 – 1941)
  - Bishop Peter Magoshiro Matsuoka (ペトロ松岡孫四郎) (1941 – 1962.04.16)
- Bishops of Nagoya:
  - Bishop Peter Magoshiro Matsuoka (ペトロ松岡孫四郎) (1962.04.16 – 1969.06.26)
  - Bishop Aloysius Nobuo Soma (アロイジオ相馬信夫) (1969.06.26 – 1993.04.05)
  - Bishop Augustinus Jun-ichi Nomura (アウグスチノ野村純一) (1993.04.05 - 2015.03.29)
  - Bishop Michael Gorō Matsuura (2015.03.29 - present)

== See also ==
- Roman Catholicism in Japan
