= George Hirschboeck =

American priest, missionary and humanitarian (1922–1993)

George J. Hirschboeck (June 6, 1922 – June 2, 1993) was an American Maryknoll priest, missionary, and humanitarian from Milwaukee, Wisconsin. He lived in Kyoto, Japan for many years and has been called a "pioneer in the ecumenical movement in Kyoto".

== Biography ==
Hirschboeck was a graduate of St. Anne's School and St. John's Cathedral High School. He was ordained a priest on June 11, 1949.

He directed a study center in Kyoto and taught English at Kyoto University. He was also instrumental in erecting the Church of the Holy Spirit—a building which incorporated both Easters and Western architecture and became a tourist attraction.
