= Okamura Fuku =

Japanese Roman Catholic nun (1899–1982)

- 岡村ふく

Personal life
- Born: June 3, 1899 Kyobashi Ward, Tokyo Prefecture, Japan
- Died: April 26, 1982 (aged 82)

Religious life
- Religion: Christianity
- Denomination: Roman Catholicism
- Order: Missionary Sisters of St. John the Evangelist

Okamura Fuku (Japanese: 岡村ふく; June 3, 1899 – April 26, 1982), also known as Mother Helen Theresia, was a Japanese Roman Catholic nun born in the Empire of Japan. In 1944 she was the co-founder, with Fr. Vincent Totsuka Bunkyō (1892–1939, Bunkei Totsuka in some sources), of the Missionary Sisters of St. John the Evangelist, and Sakuramachi hospital. She was listed as the director in the early 1970s. Louis Massignon reported meeting her and her congregation in 1959 when he visited Sakuramachi hospital in Tokyo, and she is listed in his correspondence. In 1963, when she was mother superior, she received a national medal for her work with developmentally disabled people, and her role in founding Sakuramachi hospital with Fr. Totsuka.
