= Elisabeth University of Music =

Jesuit university in Hiroshima, Japan

Coordinates: 34°23′44.1″N 132°28′4″E

- エリザベト音楽大学
- Former names: Hiroshima Music School (1947-1951); Elizabeth Music School (1951-1952); Elisabeth Music College (1952-1963)
- Type: Private
- Established: 1947; 79 years ago Chartered as a University (1963)
- Religious affiliation: Roman Catholic ((Jesuit))
- President: Yuji Kawano
- Faculty: 160
- Students: 600
- Location: 4-15 Nobori-cho, Naka-ku, Hiroshima, Japan
- Website: eum.ac.jp
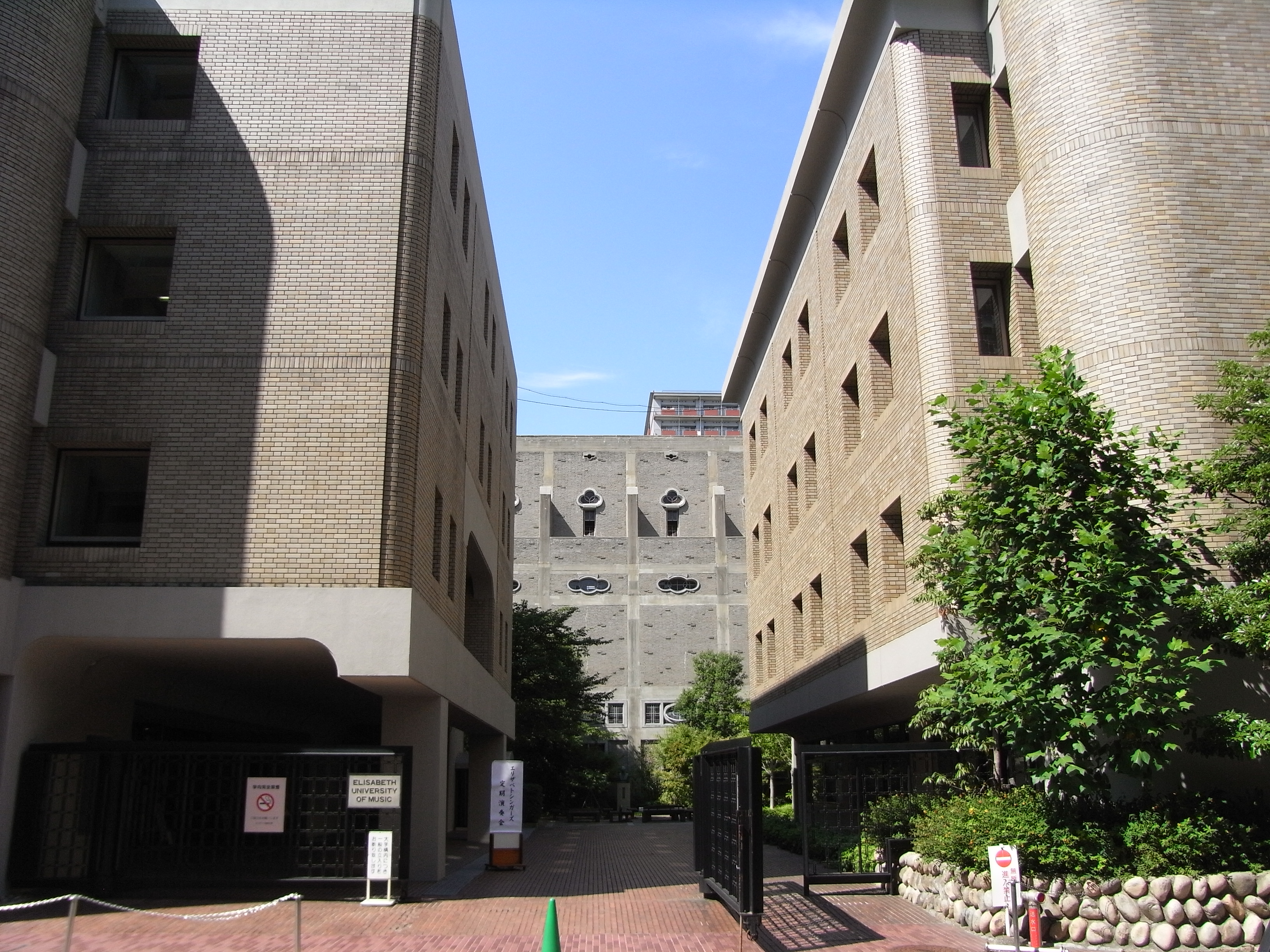

Elisabeth University of Music (EUM) (エリザベト音楽大学, Erizabeto ongaku daigaku) is a Jesuit university in Hiroshima, Japan. The predecessor of the school was founded in 1948. It was chartered as a university in 1963.

== History ==
Belgian Jesuit Father Ernest Goossens began a music classroom for youths right after the devastation of the atomic bomb, and soon had about 100 students. So in 1947 he opened "Hiroshima music school" and named it later after the late Belgian Elisabeth Queen Mother who was a patron of the school in the 1950s. It developed into a full university of music by 1963, with the doctorate established in 1993.

- 1947 Hiroshima Music School opened
- 1948 Prefecture certification of Hiroshima music school
- 1951 the late Belgian Elisabeth Queen Mother becomes the school’s patron
- 1952 Elisabeth Music College (2-year) appointed Ernesto Gosensu as first president
- 1954 religious music major department (one-year) begun
- 1959 renamed Elisabeth College; Tianjin junior college religion department installed
- 1961 Rome Pontifical Institute of Sacred Music relations established
- 1963 Elisabeth University of Music opened as four-year college; 3-year junior college and religion department desist
- 1967 religious music department expansion
- 1976 department of vocal, instrumental and department of expansion (now 4 departments)
- 1990 Graduate School of Music with master's program
- 1993 doctoral program inaugurated
- 1999 Extension Center opened
- 2001 junior orchestra inaugurated
- 2002 chamber choir Elisabeth Singers inaugurated
- 2003 early childhood music education major, in cultural music department; kindergarten teacher license course
- 2007 partnership with Tamagawa University Education Department: elementary school teacher two or license offered; Selected by the Ministry of Education, Culture, Sports, Science and Technology in "Support Program for Distinctive University Education."

== Academics ==
The area of music creation includes study of the composition theory of classical music, with a wide range of musical genres. Included in the study are the piano, orchestra, brass band, and computer music. The digital keyboard is studied from both the creation and performance perspectives.

In the music research area, the background of music in history and culture is studied, what ideas produced it, how it evolved, how it is listened to. The charm of music is studied, including not just Japan but the West and Asia and religious music also. Being both Jesuit and Catholic, the Western tradition of Gregorian chant is included.
Montessori education theory is taught as a part of early childhood music education.

In the graduate school there are four departments: musicology, religious music science, vocal music, and instrumental music. The masters (MSc) deepens the knowledge and skills gained at the undergraduate level. The doctoral program aims to foster creative research in specialized fields.

Elisabeth University maintains relationships with such employers as Kawai music schools, Yamaha Music School, Children's Music Center, Blaine (Ltd.), Roland (Ltd.), Remie Conservatory of Music, the Philippine Philharmonic Orchestra, Tokyo Music Center, and the music classrooms of Furore, Lumbini, and Haruna. Study abroad programs are active with Germany, France, Italy, and the United States.

== Activities ==
Clubs: Madrigal Society, French Study Group, German Lied Study Group, Traditional Japanese Music Society, and groups for the following: strings, flute, saxophone ensemble, brass ensemble, tuba ensemble, trombone ensemble, percussion ensemble, and for music therapy, There’s also a yoga club and a cappella club.
Campus ministry is centered at the church on campus. One can help with preparing the university-wide Masses, join Bible study groups, or study “Introduction to Christianity”.
Service opportunities: part-time jobs or volunteer opportunities are available at restaurants, movie theaters, hospitals, schools, and day care centers.

== See also ==
- List of Jesuit sites
