= Diocese of Sendai =

Latin Catholic diocese in Japan

Coordinates: 38°15′49.07″N 140°52′42.41″E

Diocese of Sendai Dioecesis Sendaiensis カトリック仙台教区

Location
- Country: Japan
- Territory: Miyagi, Aomori, Fukushima, and Iwate
- Ecclesiastical province: Tokyo
- Metropolitan: Tokyo

Statistics
- Area: 45,951 km^{2} (17,742 sq mi)
- Population: Total; Catholics: (as of 2010); 7,167,150; 10,949 (0.2%)

Information
- Denomination: Catholic Church
- Sui iuris church: Latin Church
- Rite: Roman Rite
- Cathedral: Cathedral of Saints Peter and Paul, Sendai

Current leadership
- Pope: Leo XIV
- Bishop: Edgar C. Gacutan, C.I.C.M.
- Metropolitan Archbishop: Tarcisio Isao Kikuchi
- Bishops emeritus: Martin Tetsuo Hiraga

Map
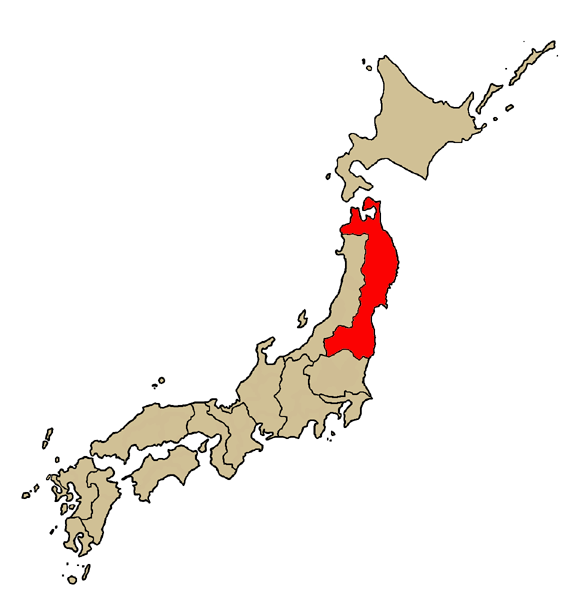

Website
- http://www.sendai.catholic.jp/

The Diocese of Sendai (Latin: Dioecesis Sendaiensis, Japanese: カトリック仙台教区) is a Latin Church diocese of the Catholic Church centered in the city of Sendai. It is within the Ecclesiastical province of Tokyo in Japan.

== History ==
On April 17, 1891, the Diocese of Hakodate was carved out of the Apostolic Vicariate of Northern Japan. On March 9, 1936, the diocese was renamed the Diocese of Sendai.

== Leadership ==
- Bishop of Sendai:
  - Bishop Edgar Cuntapay Gacutan, C.I.C.M. (8 December 2021 – present)
  - Bishop Martin Tetsuo Hiraga (マルチノ平賀徹夫) (10 December 2005 – 18 March 2020)
  - Bishop Francis Xavier Osamu Mizobe (フランシスコ・ザビエル溝部脩), S.D.B. (2000.05.10 – 2004.05.14)
  - Bishop Raymond Augustin Chihiro Sato (ライムンド佐藤千敬), O.P. (1976.01.24 – 1998.06.19)
  - Bishop Petro Arikata Kobayashi (ペトロ小林有方) (1954.02.21 – 1976.01.24)
  - Bishop Michael Wasaburo Urakawa (ミカエル浦川和三郎) (1941.11.20 – 1954)
  - Archbishop Marie-Joseph Lemieux (マリー・ジョゼフ・ルミュー) (1935.12.03 – 1941.01.16)
- Bishop of Hakodate:
  - Fr. Andre Dumas, O.P. (Apostolic Administrator 1931 – 1936)
  - Bishop Alexandre Berlioz (アレキサンドル・ベルリオーズ), M.E.P. (1891.04.24 – 1927.07.25)

== See also ==
- Catholic Church in Japan

== Sources ==
- GCatholic.org
- Catholic Hierarchy
- Diocese website
