= Catholic Church in Japan =

- Japanese: 日本のカトリック教会
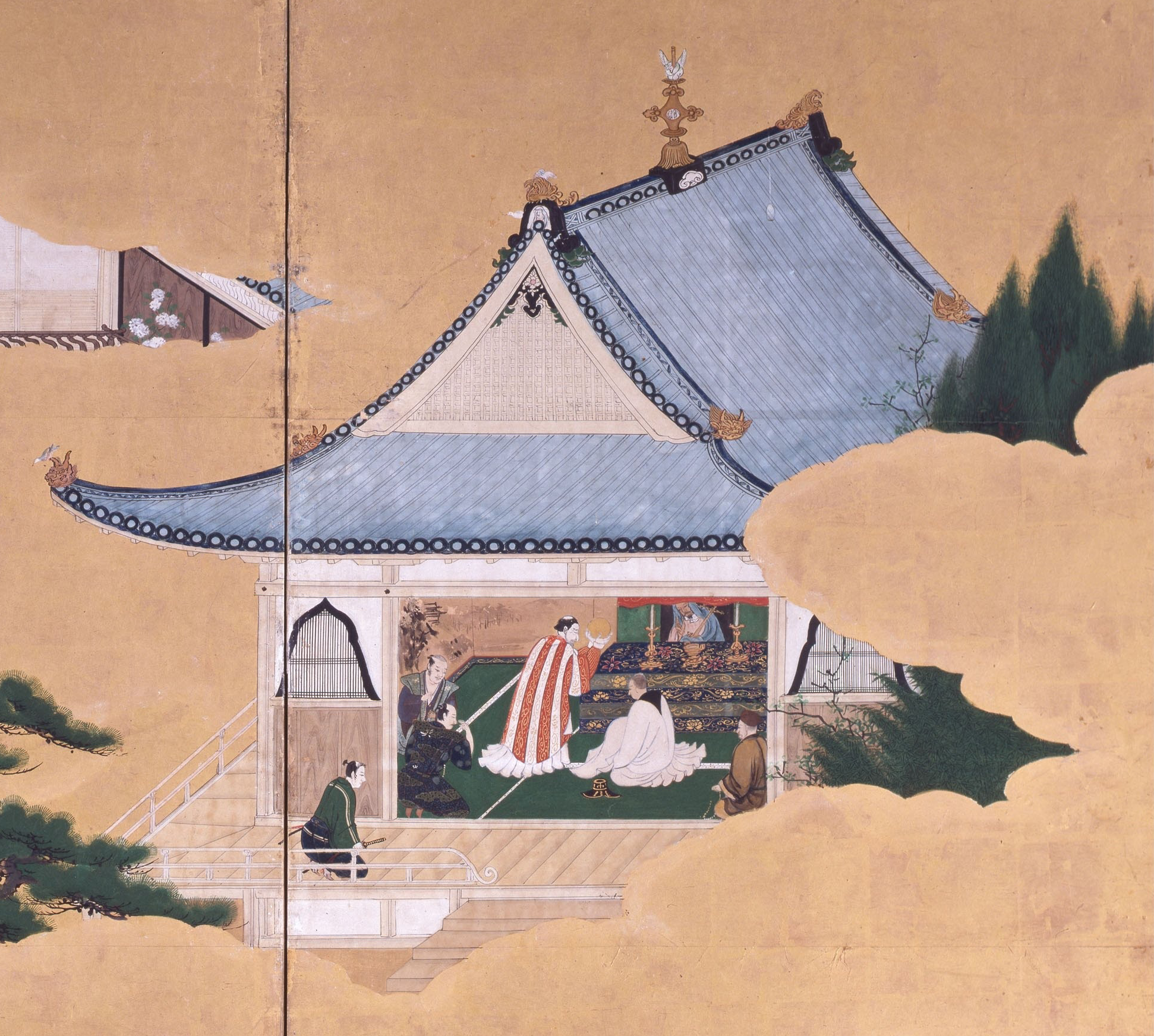
- Depiction of a prayer at a Nanban-ji, the earliest Catholic churches in Japan (c. 1600s)
- Type: National polity
- Classification: Catholic
- Orientation: Asian Christianity, Latin
- Scripture: Bible
- Theology: Catholic theology
- Governance: Catholic Bishops' Conference of Japan
- Pope: Leo XIV
- CBCJ President: Tarcisio Isao Kikuchi, Archbishop of Tokyo
- Apostolic Nuncio: Archbishop Francisco Escalante Molina
- Region: Japan
- Language: Ecclesiastical Latin; Japanese
- Headquarters: Tokyo, Japan
- Separations: Protestantism in Japan
- Members: 431,100 (2021)
- Places of worship: 957
- Tertiary institutions: Sophia University, Nanzan University, Elisabeth University of Music
- Official website: cbcj.catholic.jp

The Catholic Church in Japan is part of the worldwide Catholic Church, under the spiritual leadership of the pope in Rome. As of 2021, there were approximately 431,100 Catholics in Japan (0.34% of the total population), 6,200 of whom are clerics, religious and seminarians. Japan has 15 dioceses, including three metropolitan archdioceses, with 34 bishops, 1,235 priests, and 40 deacons spread out across 957 churches (parishes, quasi-parishes, mission stations, and assembly centres).

The bishops of the dioceses form the Catholic Bishops' Conference of Japan, the episcopal conference of the nation. The main liturgical rites employed in Japan are those of the Latin Church.

The current apostolic nuncio, who serves as the Holy See's diplomatic ambassador and delegate to the local church in Japan, is Archbishop Francisco Escalante Molina.

Christianity was introduced to Japan by the Jesuits, such as the Spaniard St. Francis Xavier and the Italian Alessandro Valignano. Portuguese Catholics founded the port of Nagasaki, considered at its founding to be an important Christian center in the Far East, though this distinction is now obsolete. There is a modern Japanese translation of the whole Bible by Federico Barbaro, an Italian missionary. Nowadays, many Japanese Catholics are ethnic Japanese from Brazil and Peru and naturalized Filipino Japanese.

The Personal Ordinariate of Our Lady of the Southern Cross, a personal ordinariate within the Catholic Church originally created as a means for Anglicans to enter communion with Rome while maintaining their patrimony, has also begun to form in Japan. As of 2015, it has two congregations.

== History ==
Christian missionaries arrived with Francis Xavier and the Jesuits in the 1540s and briefly flourished, with over 100,000 converts, including many daimyōs in Kyushu. It soon met resistance from the highest office holders of Japan. Emperor Ōgimachi issued edicts to ban Catholicism in 1565 and 1568, but to little effect. Beginning in 1587, with imperial regent Toyotomi Hideyoshi's ban on Jesuit missionaries, Christianity was repressed as a threat to national unity. After the Tokugawa shogunate banned Christianity in 1620 it ceased to exist publicly. Many Catholics went underground, becoming hidden Christians (隠れキリシタン, kakure kirishitan), while others died. Only after the Meiji Restoration was Christianity re-established in Japan.

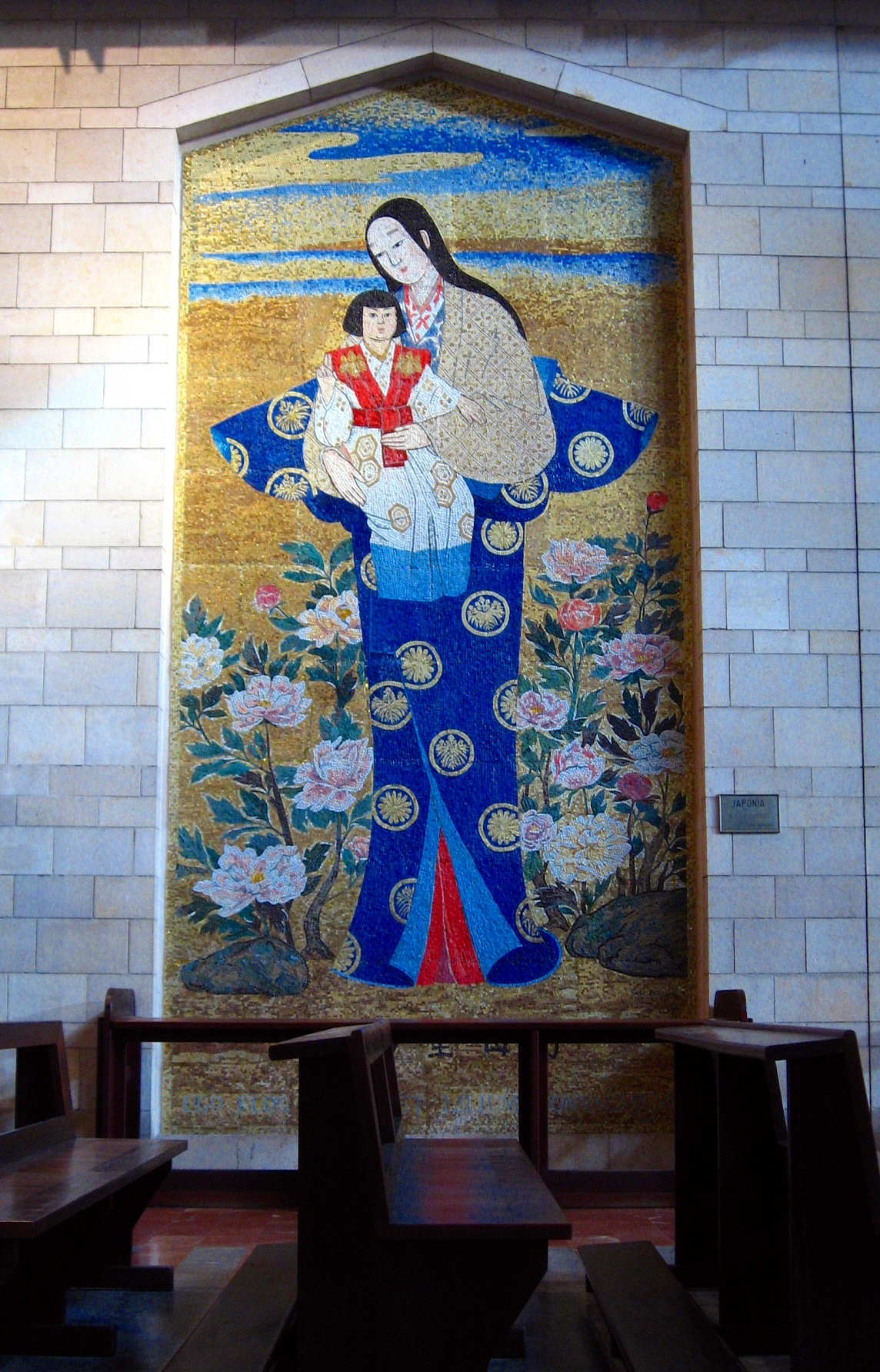
Japanese mosaic of Madonna and Child, in the Church of the Annunciation, Nazareth (a gift from Japanese Catholics to the church)

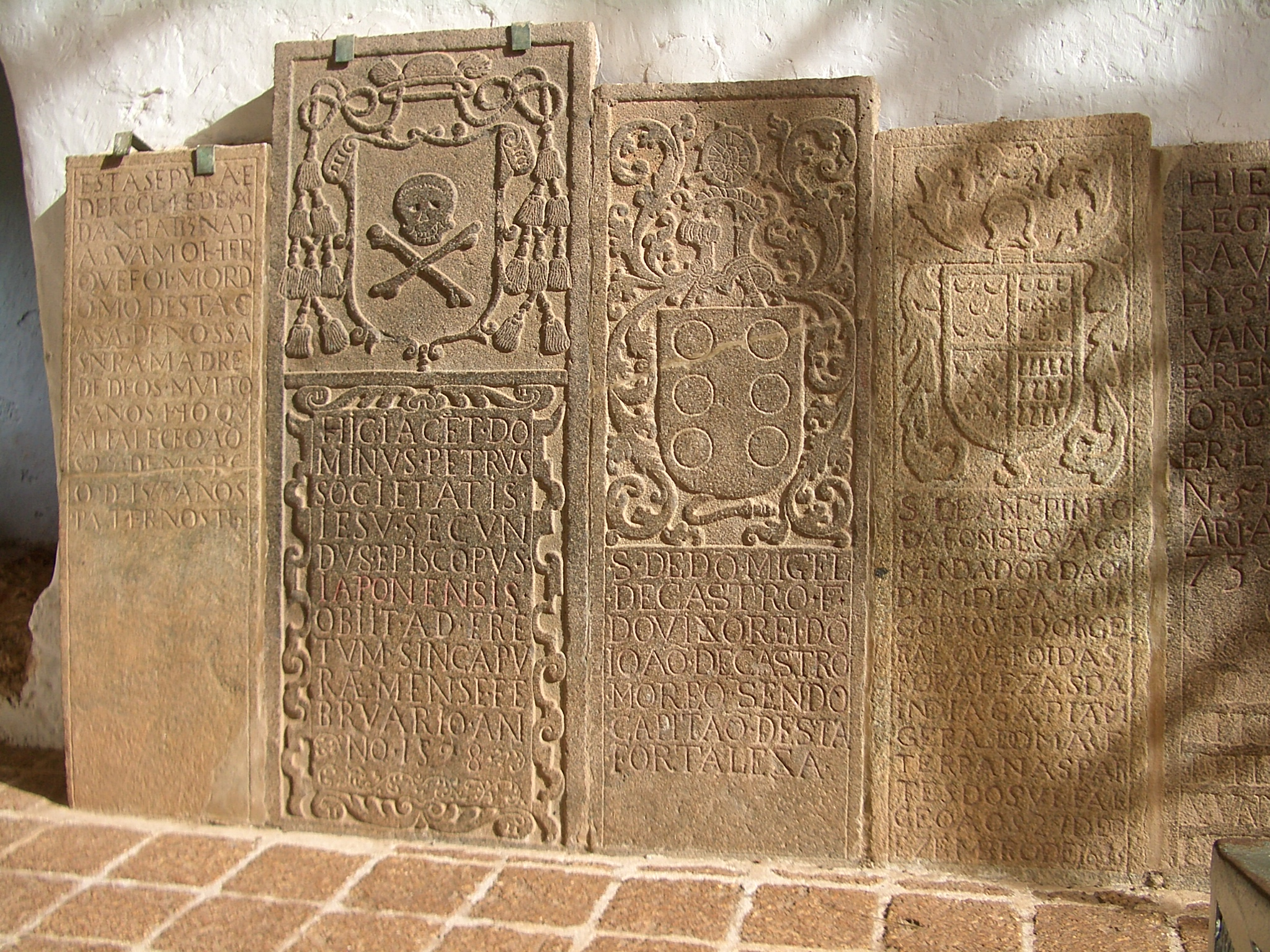
Gravestone (second from the left), in Malacca's St. Paul's Church, of Peter Martinez consecrated as the second bishop of Japan in Goa, 1595 and arrived in Nagasaki, 1596. He left in 1597 following the deaths of the 26 Martyrs of Japan. Died en route to Goa in February 1598.

== Organisation ==
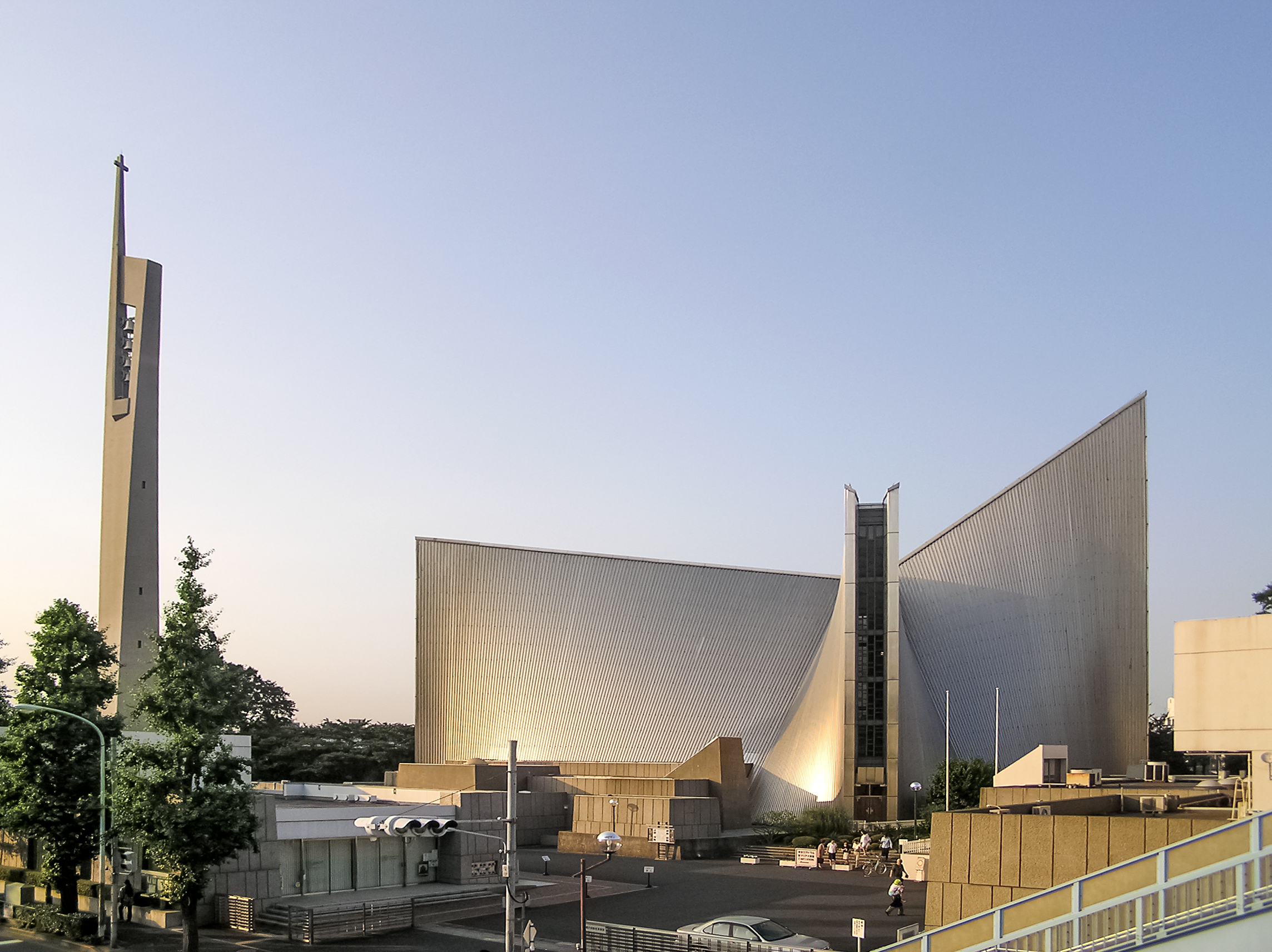
St. Mary's Cathedral in Tokyo, which serves as the see of the Metropolitan Archdiocese of Tokyo

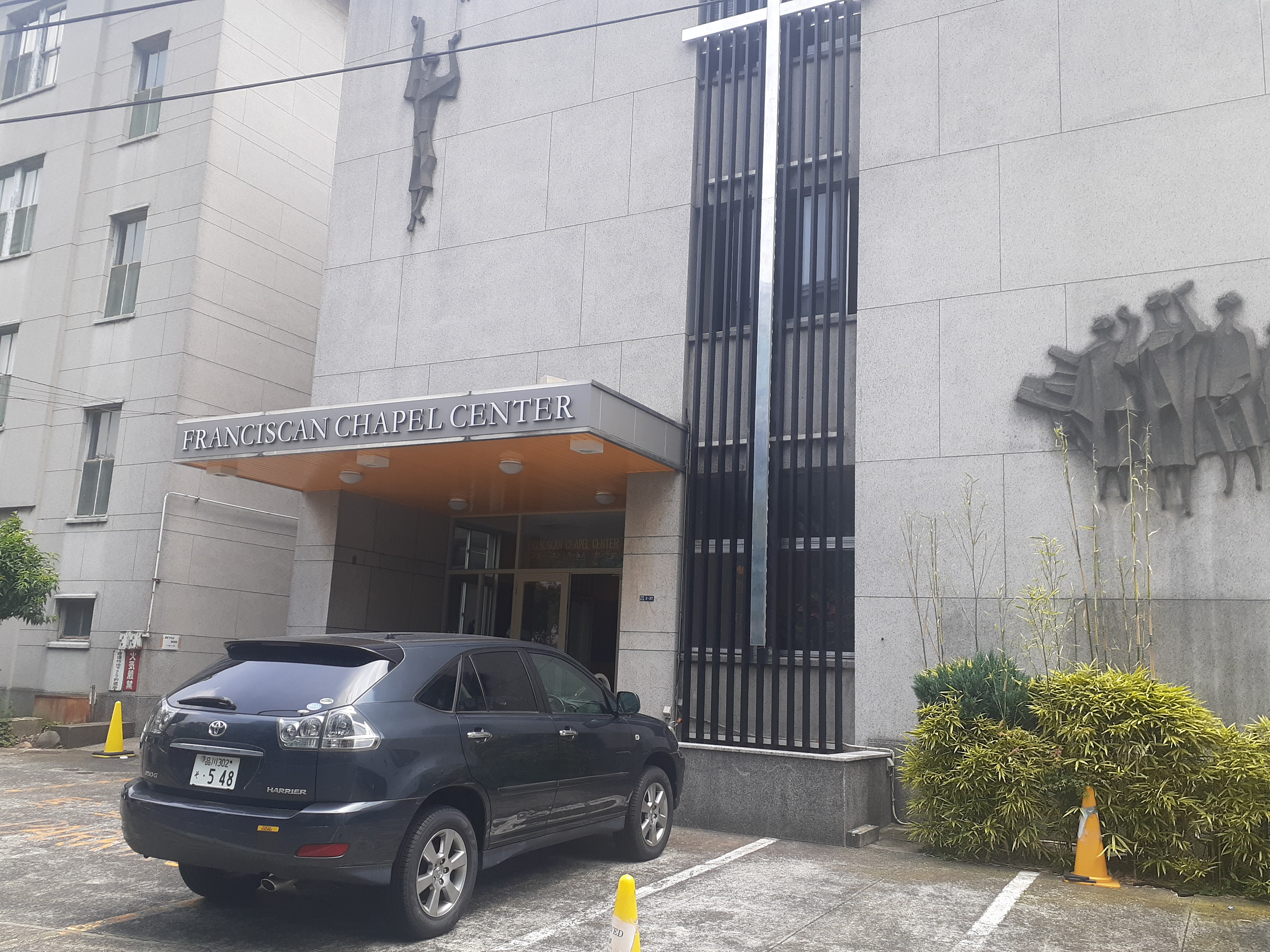
Franciscan Chapel Center in Roppongi, Tokyo

=== Governance ===
The Catholic Bishops' Conference of Japan is the Japanese episcopal conference, which serves as the main decision-making body of the Church in Japan. The current President of the CBCJ is Isao Kikuchi.

The Catholic Church in Japan is divided into three ecclesiastical provinces with a total of 15 dioceses, three of which are metropolitan archdioceses. Japan has no military ordinariate compared with its neighbour South Korea. However, it does share a personal ordinariate with two other countries, Australia and the Philippines.

== Ecclesiastical territories ==
The Catholic Church in Japan is organised into 15 dioceses, 3 of which are classified as metropolitan dioceses that head each of the 3 ecclesiastical provinces in the country.

Map of the ecclesiastical provinces and dioceses of Japan (Japanese).

=== Dioceses by region ===
==== Ecclesiastical Province of Nagasaki ====
- Metropolitan Archdiocese of Nagasaki
  - Diocese of Fukuoka
  - Diocese of Kagoshima
  - Diocese of Naha
  - Diocese of Oita

==== Ecclesiastical Province of Osaka ====
- Metropolitan Archdiocese of Osaka-Takamatsu
  - Diocese of Hiroshima
  - Diocese of Kyoto
  - Diocese of Nagoya

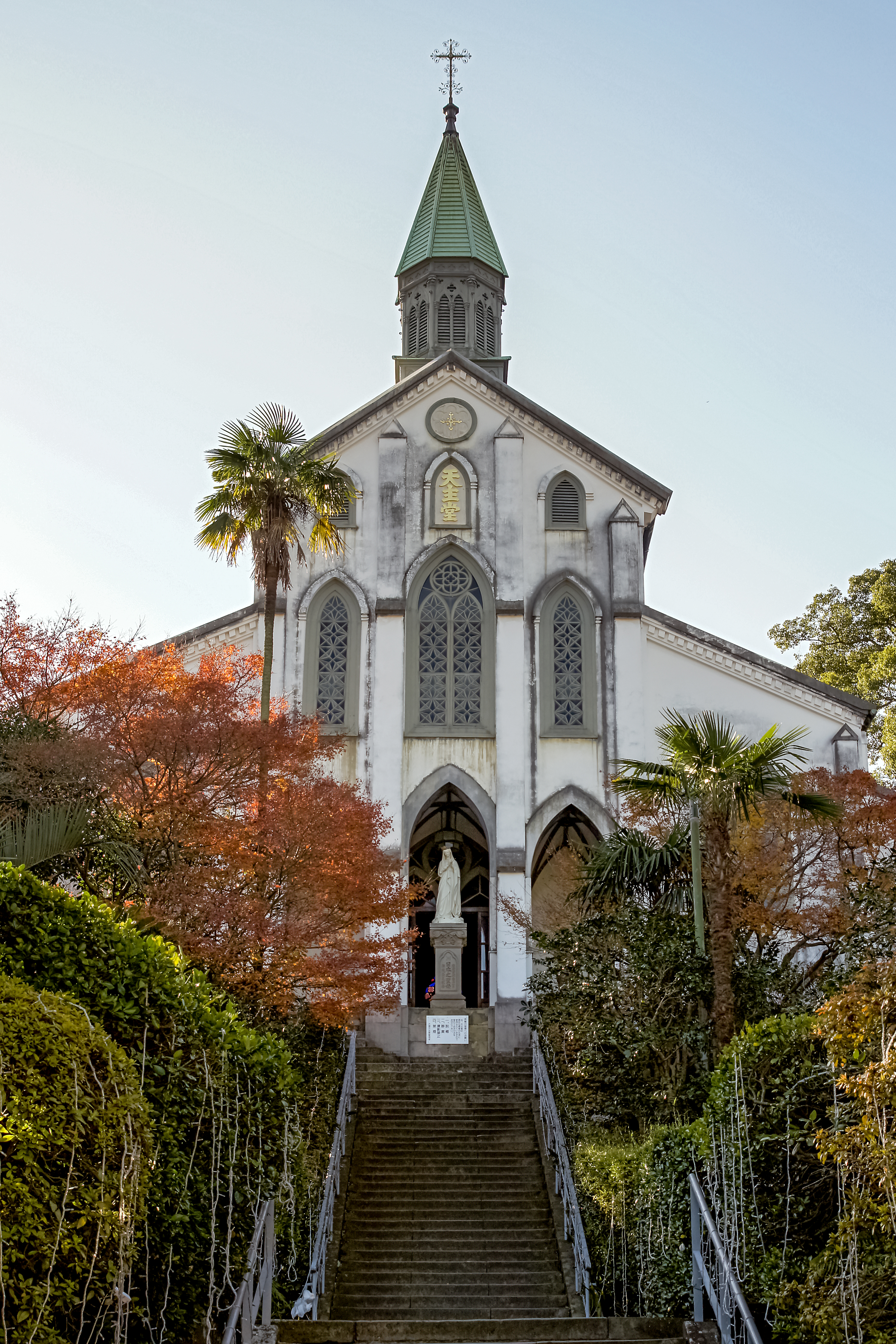
Basilica of the Twenty-Six Holy Martyrs of Japan (Nagasaki)

==== Ecclesiastical Province of Tokyo ====
- Metropolitan Archdiocese of Tokyo
  - Diocese of Niigata
  - Diocese of Saitama
  - Diocese of Sapporo
  - Diocese of Sendai
  - Diocese of Yokohama

==== Personal Ordinariate ====
- Personal Ordinariate of Our Lady of the Southern Cross

== Catholic education in Japan ==
The Catholic Church is involved in religious education in Japan, providing learning opportunities to both Catholic and non-Catholic students. According to the Catholic Bishops' Conference of Japan, Japan has a total of 828 Catholic educational institutions. The Church operates different types of schools, which can be seen below:

Catholic Schools in Japan by Kind
School type	Number of schools
Kindergartens	515
Primary schools	53
Middle and high schools	217
Colleges and universities	32
Colleges of technology	1
Vocational colleges	4
Schools for special needs education	1
Miscellaneous schools	5

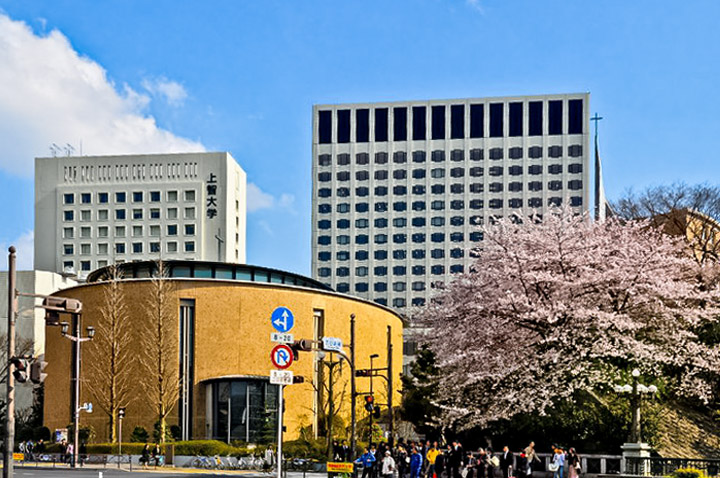
Sophia University Yotsuya Campus in Tokyo, Japan.

The Jesuit Sophia University in Chiyoda, Tokyo is listed in the Times Higher Education and QS Global University rankings, and is considered one of the top private universities in Japan. It is one of 37 universities selected by the Japanese Government to participate in the Top Global University Project and receive financial assistance to boost globalisation in Japan and foster research.

Other Catholic universities in Japan include Nanzan University (Nagoya, Aichi) and the Elisabeth University of Music (Hiroshima, Hiroshima).

== Notable Japanese Roman Catholic sisters and priests ==
Okamura Fuku, nun and co-founder of the Missionary Sisters of St. John the Evangelist.

Magdalene of Nagasaki, tertiary of the Order of Augustinian Recollects.

Domingos Chohachi Nakamura, missionary and priest.

Shigeto Oshida, Dominican priest.

Takako Takahashi, author and nun.

Kazuko Watanabe, nun, educator, and writer.

== Martyrs and canonised saints ==
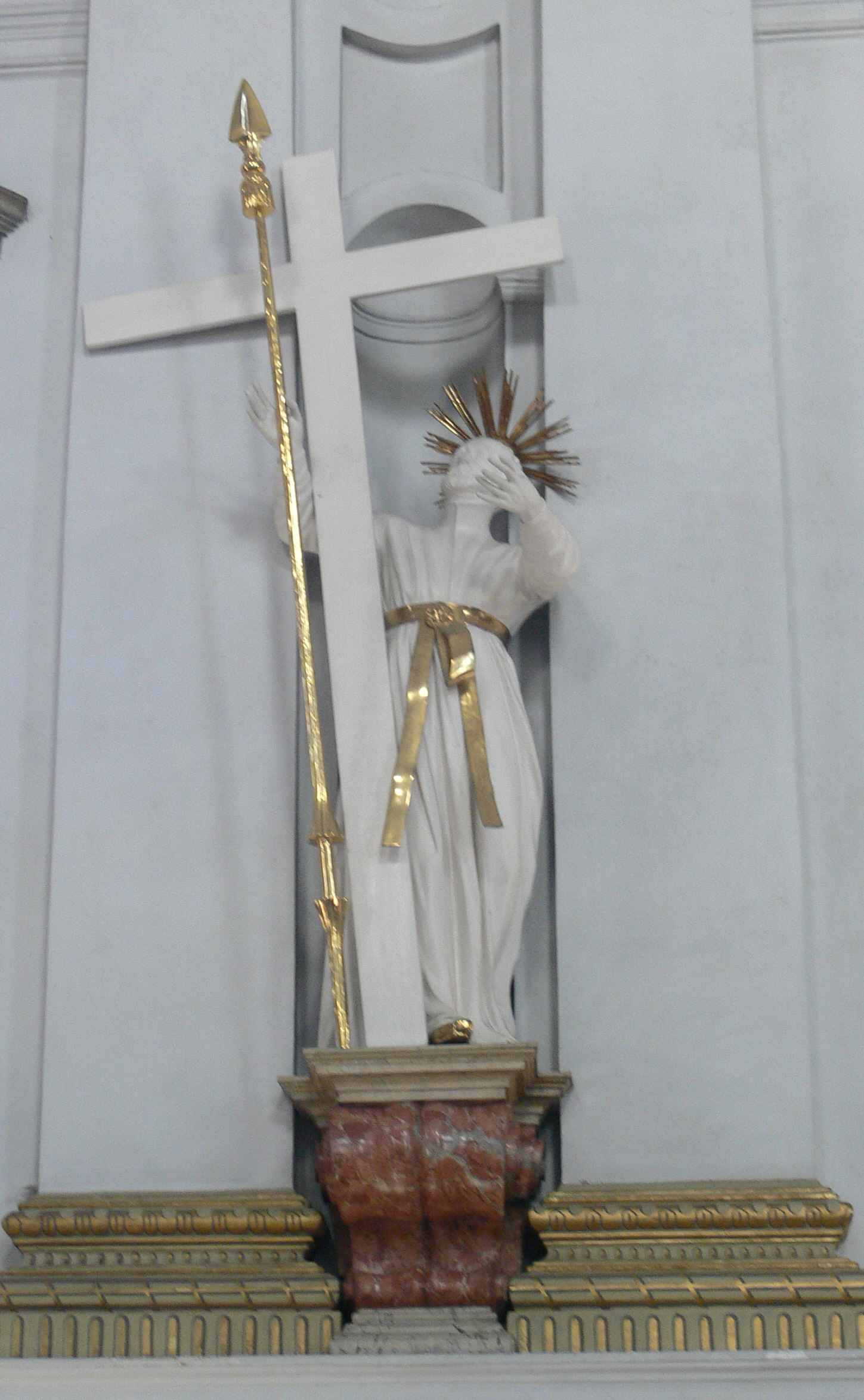
Statue of St Paul Miki, who is a member of the Twenty-Six Martyrs of Japan, in St Martin's Church in Bamberg, Germany.

Founded in 1986, the Committee for Promoting Canonisation, which is directly affiliated with the Standing Committee of the Catholic Bishops' Conference of Japan, is responsible for promoting Japan's canonisation efforts and recognition of its martyrs. Its main objectives are to support local dioceses in promoting cases for canonisation, support canonisation promoted by the Conference, and promotion devotions to Japanese Catholic martyrs.

All Catholic martyrs in Japan, both native Japanese and foreign missionaries, were persecuted and killed during the Sakoku period of Japanese isolationism. Some of the groups of martyrs and individual martyrs were later canonised and venerated as saints in the Church's liturgical calendar.

=== Canonised saints ===
- Twenty-Six Martyrs of Japan (also called St Paul Miki and Companions)
- Paul Miki (one of the Twenty-Six Martyrs)
- Sixteen Martyrs of Japan

=== Martyrs ===
Martyrs	Date	Description	Beatified	Canonised	Feast day
Twenty-Six Martyrs of Japan (also known as St. Paul Miki and Companions)	1597	First group of Catholic martyrs in Japan. Executed by crucifixion in Nagasaki on 5 February 1597.	14 September 1627 by Pope Urban VIII	8 June 1862 by Pope Pius IX	6 February
205 Martyrs of Japan	1598 - 1632	205 missionaries and Hidden Christians who were persecuted and executed in a period of 20 years for their faith.	7 May 1867 by Pope Pius IX		10 September
Augustinian Recollects Martyrs	1632	Two missionary Augustinian Recollects who left the Philippines to evangelise the Japanese. They fled into the mountains to escape persecution but were later arrested and killed when they descended into the city. Martyred in Nagasaki on 11 December 1632.	23 April 1989 by Pope John Paul II		11 December
Sixteen Martyrs of Japan	1633 - 1637	16 Hidden Christians who were martyred for their faith from 1633 to 1637.	18 February 1981 by Pope John Paul II	18 October 1987 by Pope John Paul II	28 September
188 Martyrs of Japan	1603 -1639	Additional priests and Catholics who were persecuted and martyred from 1603 to 1639.	24 November 2008 by Pope Benedict XVI		

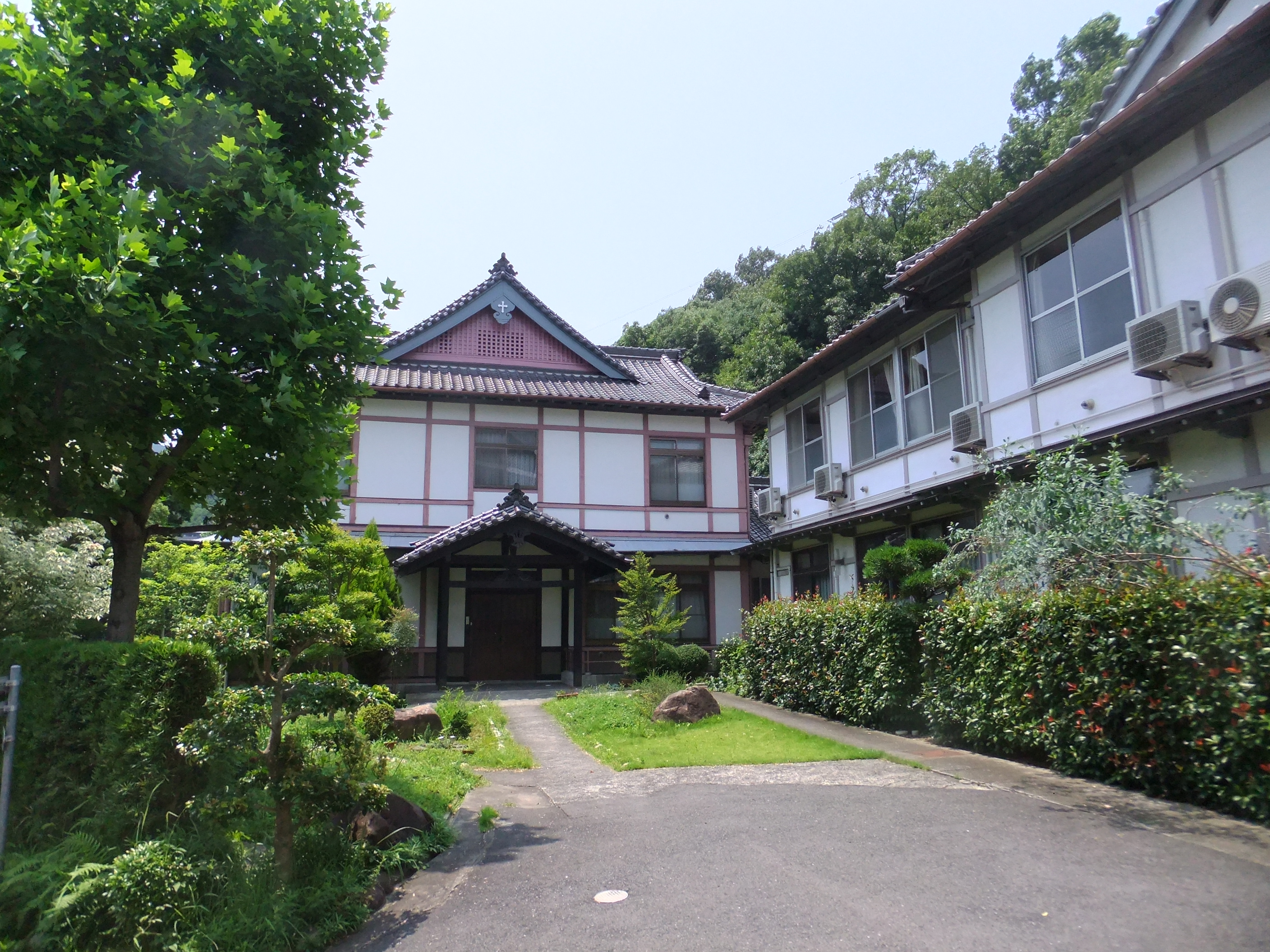
Nagatsuka Monastery for Jesuits in Hiroshima features traditional temple architecture

== Papal visits ==
- Pope John Paul II (1981) became the first pontiff to visit Japan and visited the atomic bomb memorial sites in Hiroshima and Nagasaki.
- Pope Francis (November 2019) was the first pontiff to visit Japan in decades. He visited the then-Prime Minister Shinzo Abe, Emperor Naruhito at the Tokyo Imperial Palace, Sophia University, and the Nagasaki Atomic Bomb Hypocenter Park.

== See also ==
- Christianity in Japan
- List of Saints from Asia
- Kirishitan
- History of the Catholic Church in Japan
- Tarō Asō
- Martyrdom of the 26 Saints of Japan
- Lorenzo Ruiz
- Silence, the acclaimed historical novel by Shūsaku Endō drawn from the oral histories of the "Hidden Christian" communities (Kakure Kirishitan and Hanare Kirishitan) that survived the 17th century state suppression of the Catholic Church in Japan.
- Domingos Chohachi Nakamura, the 1st Japanese missionary to work abroad, he emigrated to Brazil in 1923 to work on behalf of the Japanese living there. His process of beatification started in 2002.
- Our Lady of Akita
- List of Catholic Bishops in Japan
