= Diocese of Hiroshima =

Latin Catholic diocese in Japan

Coordinates: 34°23′N 132°27′E

Diocese of Hiroshima Dioecesis Hiroshimaensis カトリック広島教区
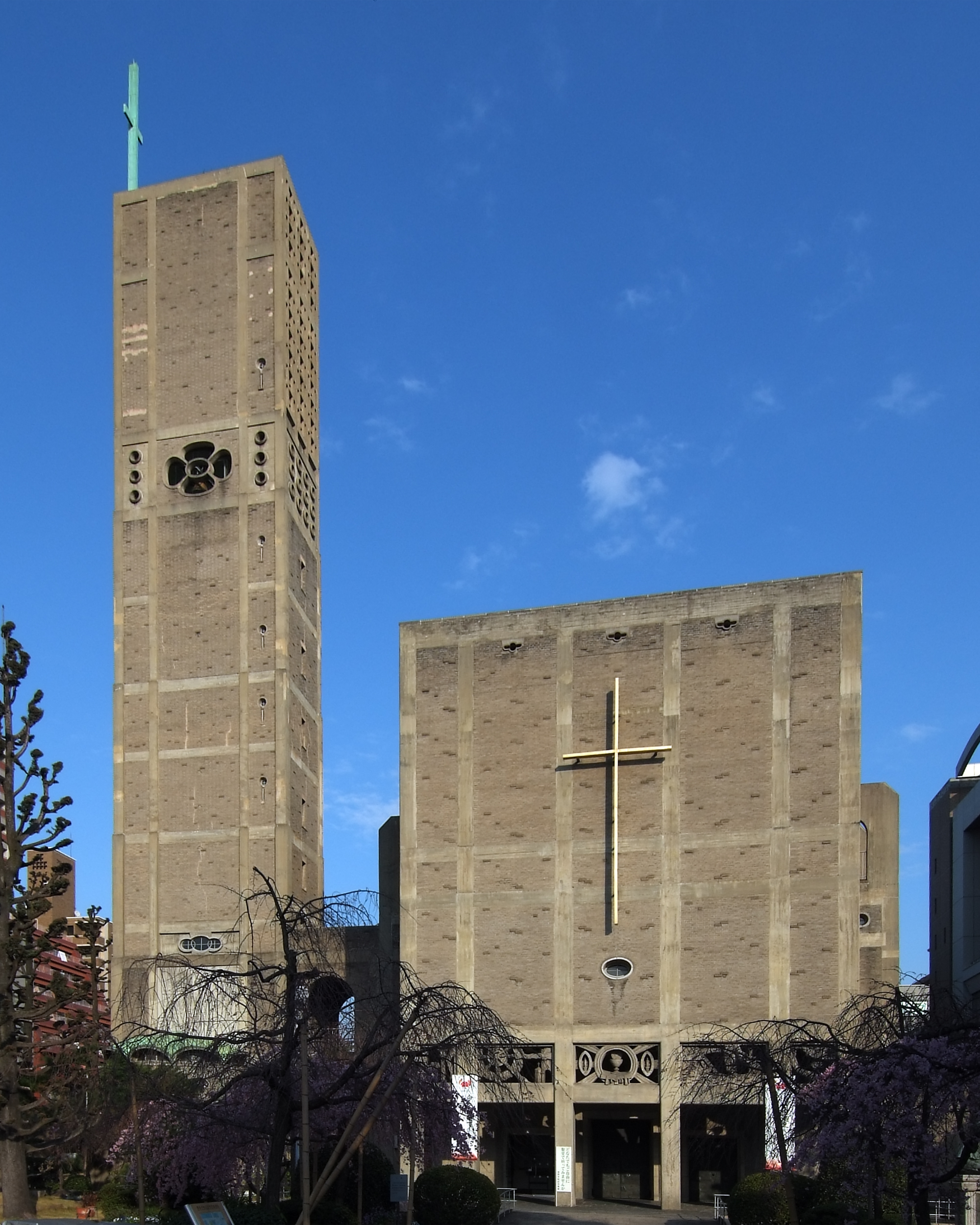
- Hiroshima World Peace Memorial Cathedral

Location
- Country: Japan
- Territory: Hiroshima, Okayama, Tottori, Yamaguchi, and Shimane
- Ecclesiastical province: Osaka
- Metropolitan: Osaka

Statistics
- Area: 3,180 km^{2} (1,230 sq mi)
- Population: Total; Catholics: (as of 2006); 7,677,735; 21,496 (0.3%)

Information
- Denomination: Catholic Church
- Sui iuris church: Latin Church
- Rite: Roman Rite
- Cathedral: Cathedral of the Assumption of Mary in Hiroshima

Current leadership
- Pope: Leo XIV
- Bishop: Alexis Mitsuru Shirahama, P.S.S
- Metropolitan Archbishop: Thomas Aquino Manyo Maeda

Map
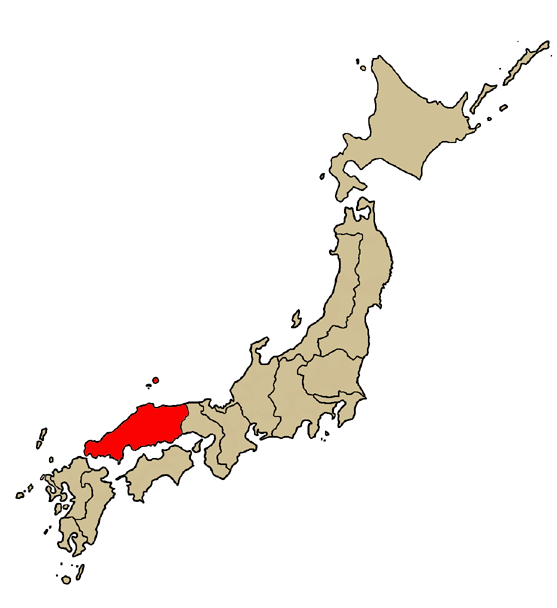

Website
- Website of the Diocese

The Diocese of Hiroshima (Latin: Dioecesis Hiroshimaensis, Japanese: カトリック広島教区) is a Latin Catholic diocese of the Catholic Church located in the city of Hiroshima in the ecclesiastical province of Osaka in Japan.

== History ==
- May 4, 1923: Established as Apostolic Vicariate of Hiroshima from the Diocese of Osaka
- June 30, 1959: Promoted as Diocese of Hiroshima

== Leadership ==
- Bishops of Hiroshima (Roman rite)
  - Bishop Alexis Mitsuru Shirahama, P.S.S (since 2016.09.19)
  - Bishop Thomas Aquino Manyo Maeda (2011.06.13-2014.08.20)
  - Bishop Joseph Atsumi Misue (ヨゼフ三末篤實) (1985.03.29 - 2011.06.13)
  - Bishop Dominic Yoshimatsu Noguchi (ドミニコ野口由松) (1959.12.19 – 1985.03.29)
- Vicars Apostolic of Hiroshima 広島 (Roman rite)
  - Bishop Johannes Ross (ヨハネス・ロス), S.J. (1928.05.18 – 1940)
  - Archbishop Heinrich Döring (ハインリヒ・デーリング), S.J. (1921.06.16 – 1927.07.14)

== See also ==
- Catholic Church in Japan
