= Catholic Bishops' Conference of Japan =

Japanese Catholic episcopal conference

- カトリック中央協議会(ちゅうおうきょうぎかい)
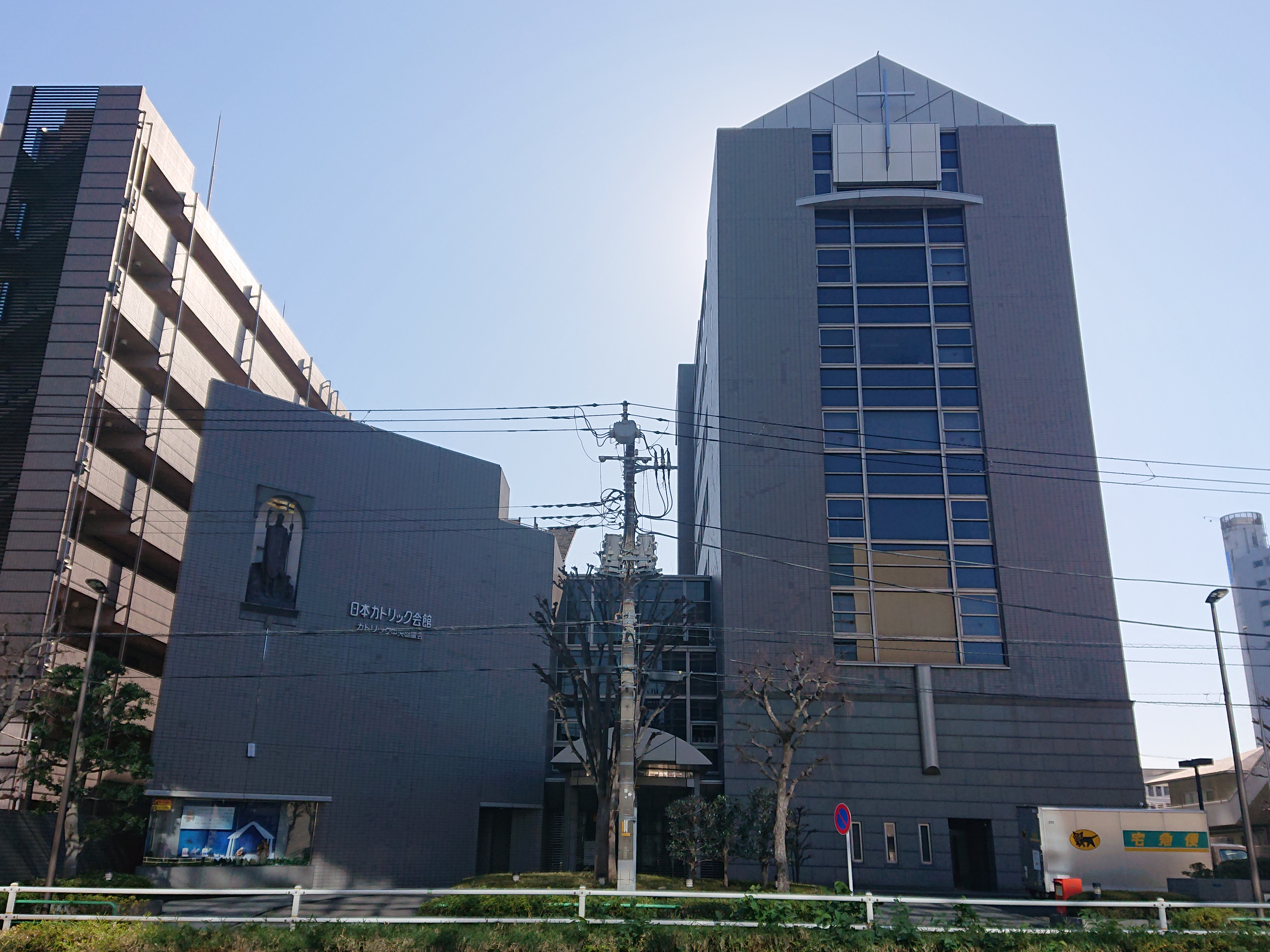
- Abbreviation: CBCJ
- Formation: 1940; 86 years ago
- Type: Episcopal conference, Non-governmental organisation
- Legal status: Religious corporation
- Headquarters: Kōtō, Tokyo, Japan
- Region served: Japan
- Members: Active and retired Catholic bishops of Japan (diocesan, auxiliary, coadjutor, honorary)
- President: Tarcisio Isao Kikuchi, Archbishop of Tokyo
- Vice-President: Masahiro Umemura
- Main organ: Standing Committee
- Parent organization: Catholic Church
- Subsidiaries: Japan Catholic News (Katorikku Shimbun)
- Website: www.cbcj.catholic.jp
- Formerly called: Nippon Tenshu Kokyo Kyodan (Japanese Catholic Religious Body)

The Catholic Bishops' Conference of Japan (Japanese: カトリック中央協議会, Hepburn: Japanese: Katorikku Chūo Kyōgikai), also abbreviated as the CBCJ, is the Catholic episcopal conference of Japan, representing predominantly the members of the Latin Japanese Catholic Church. It was founded as the Nippon Tenshu Kokyo Kyodan (The Japanese Catholic Religious Body). After the implementation and execution of the Religious Corporations Act, the body was renamed the CBCJ, becoming a religious corporation as classified under Japanese law.

As specified in Canons 447–459 of the Code of Canon Law, the main purpose of the organisation is to deliberate on matters concerning the Japanese Catholic Church and to encourage active practice of the Catholic faith and ministries.

The head office of the corporation is located in Kōtō, Tokyo.

== Organisation ==
=== Membership ===
The Catholic Bishops' Conference of Japan is composed of multiple types of bishops: the diocesan bishops as well as their auxiliary and coadjutor bishops. It also includes of honorary bishops appointed by the Holy See or the organisation for specific tasks.

- President of the Conference
- Vice President
- Members (Diocesan bishops, auxiliary bishops, coadjutor bishops, honorary bishops)
- Bishop in Charge

The Conference is further divided into various groups, each with their functions and level of seniority within the organisation. They consist of the Standing Committee, Plenary Assemblies, Special Committees, and Sections directly under the Standing Committees.

=== Governance ===
The Standing Committee is the central executive organ of the corporation, which represents the Conference when the Plenary Assembly is not in session. the Committee consists of several individuals:

- President and Vice President of the Conference
- 5 additional members selected in a session of the Plenary Assembly.

The duties of the Committee include the administration of the Conference, the agenda preparation for the Plenary Assemblies, the annual budget, the presentation of the statement of accounts, directions of the General Secretariat, etc.

The current chair of the Standing Committee is Tarcisio Isao Kikuchi, Archbishop of Tokyo.

=== Committees ===
The role of the Episcopal Commission for Social Issues is to contribute to evangelisation of the Catholic faith and actively participate in solving current social issues in Japan and its Catholic Church. Members of the Commission include:

- Chair, Japan Catholic Council for Social Justice and Peace
- President and Vice President, Caritas Japan
- Chair, Committee against BURAKU Discrimination through Human-Rights Approaches,
- Chair, Catholic Commission of Japan for Migrants, Refugees and People on the Move
- President of the HIV/AIDS Desk
- the bishop in charge of the Protection of the Human Rights of Women and Children Desk

The current chair of the Commission is Taiji Katsuya.

==== Committees directly affiliated with the Standing Committee ====
Committee/section type	Committee/section name
Permanent committees	Committee for Church Administration and Legislation
Permanent committees	Committee for Finance
Permanent committees	Committee for the Formation of Permanent Deacons in Japan
Permanent committees	Committee for the Liturgy
Permanent committees	Committee for School Education
Permanent committees	Committee for New Evangelisation
Permanent committees	Committee for Promoting Canonisation
Sections	Combined Committee for Bishops and Religious
Sections	Section for the Ongoing Formation of Priests
Sections	Section for Scripture and Doctrine
Sections	Section for Inter-religious Dialogue
Sections	Section for Ecumenism
Sections	Section for the Catholic Church in China
Sections	Section of the Pastoral Care of Youth
Special committees	Special Committee for the Vocabulary Concerning Faith

==== Committees affiliated with the Episcopal Commission for Social Issues ====
- Committees Affiliated with the Episcopal Commission for Social Issues
  - Catholic Commission of Japan for Migrants, Refugees and People on the Move
  - Caritas Japan
  - Japan Catholic Council for Justice and Peace
  - Committee against BURAKU Discrimination through Human-Rights Approaches
  - Protection of the Human Rights of Women and Children Desk
  - HIV/AIDS Desk

== See also ==
- Catholic Church in Japan
- Christianity in Japan
