= Paul Yoshigoro Taguchi =

His Eminence Paul Yoshigoro Taguchi
- Cardinal, Archbishop of Osaka
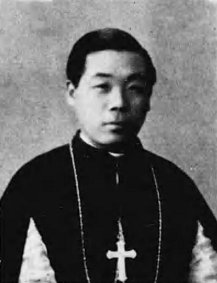
- Archdiocese: Osaka
- Installed: December 14, 1941
- Term ended: February 23, 1978
- Predecessor: Jean-Baptiste Castanier, M.E.P.
- Successor: Paul Hisao Yasuda

Orders
- Ordination: December 22, 1928
- Consecration: December 14, 1941
- Created cardinal: March 5, 1973 by Pope Paul VI
- Rank: Cardinal

Personal details
- Born: Taguchi Yoshigoro; July 20, 1902 Sotome, Nagasaki, Japan
- Died: February 23, 1978 (aged 75) Osaka, Japan
- Buried: Cathedral of the Blessed Virgin Mary, Osaka
- Denomination: Roman Catholic

Styles of Paul Yoshigoro Taguchi
- Reference style: His Eminence
- Spoken style: Your Eminence
- Informal style: Cardinal
- See: Osaka

Paul Yoshigoro Taguchi (田口芳五郎, Taguchi Yoshigoro; July 20, 1902 – February 23, 1978) was a Japanese prelate of the Roman Catholic Church. He served as Archbishop of Osaka from 1941 until his death in 1978, and was elevated to the rank of cardinal in 1973.

Taguchi was born in Sotome, Nagasaki (now part of the city of Nagasaki). After graduation from Sapientia University, now St. Thomas University, Japan, he studied at the Pontifical Urbaniana University and Pontifical Athenaeum S. Apollinare in Rome, where he was ordained to the priesthood on December 22, 1928. After finishing his studies in 1931, he returned to the Archdiocese of Tokyo, where he served as a seminary professor and director general of the Catholic Press Centre until 1936. From 1936 to 1940, he was secretary of the Apostolic Delegation to Japan.

On November 25, 1941, Taguchi was appointed Bishop of Osaka by Pope Pius XII. He received his episcopal consecration on the following December 14 from Apostolic Delegate in Japan Archbishop Paolo Marella, with Archbishop Peter Doi and Bishop Johannes Ross, S.J. serving as co-consecrators, at the Cathedral of Tokyo. He attended the Second Vatican Council from 1962 to 1965, and was promoted to the rank of metropolitan archbishop on July 24, 1969. He also served as President of the Japanese Episcopal Conference from 1970 to 1978. Pope Paul VI created him Cardinal Priest of S. Maria in Via in the consistory of March 5, 1973.

During the Second World War, he was mobilized by the Japanese authorities to establish contacts for the government with the Catholics of the Philippines. Apparently, this move alerted the American Archbishop of Manila, Michael J. O'Doherty, who claimed that this was an attempt to supplant his authority as the Primate of the Philippines. Then, correspondence between Washington, Vatican, and Manila cleared up the misunderstanding since Taguchi's visit to Manila served no political purpose.

Taguchi died in Osaka, aged 75; he is buried in the Cathedral of the Blessed Virgin Mary, Osaka.

His most accessible writing in English is "The study of Sacred Scripture".
