= List of Japanese people =

This is a list of notable Japanese people.

To be included in this list, the person must have a Wikipedia article showing they are Japanese.

== Authors ==
- Kobo Abe, author of The Woman in the Dunes
- Ryunosuke Akutagawa
- Matsuo Basho, author of The Narrow Road to the Deep North
- Osamu Dazai, author of No Longer Human
- Yasunari Kawabata, winner of the Nobel Prize in Literature
- Yukio Mishima
- Haruki Murakami
- Kenzaburo Oe, winner of the Nobel Prize in Literature
- Murasaki Shikibu, author of The Tale of Genji
- Sei Shonagon, author of The Pillow Book
- Natsume Soseki, author of Kokoro
- Junichiro Tanizaki
- Yoshida Kenkō, author of Essays in Idleness

== Company founders ==
- Yoshisuke Aikawa (1880–1967), founder of Nissan
- Takeo Fujisawa (1910–1988), co-founder of the automobile manufacturer Honda
- Hirotoshi Honda (born 1942), founder of Mugen Motorsports
- Konosuke Matsushita (1894–1989), founder of Panasonic
- Hiroshi Mikitani (born 1965), founder of Rakuten
- Mitsui Takatoshi (1622–1694), founder of Mitsui
- Kokichi Mikimoto (1858–1954), founder of Mikimoto
- Soichiro Honda (1906–1991), co-founder of the automobile manufacturer Honda
- Jujiro Matsuda (1875–1952), founder of Mazda automobile company
- Michio Suzuki (1887–1982), founder of Suzuki
- Eiji Toyoda (1913–2013), founder of luxury automobile manufacturer Lexus
- Kiichiro Toyoda (1894–1952), founder of automobile manufacturer Toyota in 1937
- Sakichi Toyoda (1867–1930), founder of Toyota Industries and Toyota Group

== Educators ==
- Mori Arinori
- Tsunesaburō Makiguchi
- Midori Suzuki
- Fukuzawa Yukichi
- Yukio Tsuda
- Kanō Jigorō
- Imai Yone

== Emperors ==
No.	Reign	Portrait	Posthumous name	Personal name (imina)	Notes
Legendary Emperors
1	660 BC–585 BCE		Emperor Jimmu	Kan'yamato Iwarebiko	presumed legendary; claimed descent from the sun goddess, Amaterasu
2	581 BCE–549 BCE		Emperor Suizei	Kamu Nunagawamimi no Mikoto	presumed legendary; 3rd son of Jimmu
3	549 BCE–511 BCE		Emperor Annei	Shikitsuhiko Tamademi no Mikoto	presumed legendary; son and heir of Suizei
4	510 BCE–476 BCE		Emperor Itoku	Oho Yamatohiko Sukitomo no Mikoto	presumed legendary; 2nd son of Annei
5	475 BCE–393 BCE		Emperor Kōshō	Mimatsuhiko Kaeshine no Mikoto	presumed legendary; son and heir of Itoku
6	392 BCE–291 BCE		Emperor Kōan	Oho Yamato Tarasihiko Kunioshi Hito no Mikoto	presumed legendary; 2nd son of Kōshō
7	290 BCE–215 BCE		Emperor Kōrei	Oho Yamato Nekohiko Futoni no Mikoto	presumed legendary
8	214 BCE–158 BCE		Emperor Kōgen	Oho Yamato Nekohiko Kuni Kuru no Mikoto	presumed legendary
9	157 BCE–98 BCE		Emperor Kaika	Waka Yamato Nekohiko Oho Bibino no Mikoto	presumed legendary
10	97 BCE–30 BCE		Emperor Sujin	Mimaki Irihiko Inie no Mikoto	first emperor with a direct possibility of existence
11	29 BCE–70 CE		Emperor Suinin	Ikume Irihiko Isachi no Mikoto	
12	71–130		Emperor Keikō	Oho Tarasihiko Osirowake no Mikoto	
13	131–191		Emperor Seimu	Waka Tarasihiko	
14	192–200		Emperor Chūai	Tarasi Nakatsuhiko no Mikoto	
	201–269		Empress Jingū	Okinaga Tarashihime no Mikoto	Served as regent for Emperor Ōjin; not counted among the officially numbered emperors
Kofun period
15	270–310		Emperor Ōjin	Honda no Sumera-mikoto / Ōtomowake no Mikoto / Homutawake no Mikoto	Last proto-historical emperor, deified as Hachiman
16	313–399		Emperor Nintoku	Ō Sazaki no Mikoto	Inaccurate dates
17	400–405		Emperor Richū	Isaho Wake no Mikoto	Inaccurate dates
18	406–410		Emperor Hanzei	Tajihi Mizuha Wake no Mikoto	Inaccurate dates
19	411–453		Emperor Ingyō	Wo Asazuma Wakugo no Sukune	Inaccurate dates.
20	453–456		Emperor Ankō	Anaho no Mikoto	Inaccurate dates.
21	456–479		Emperor Yūryaku	Oho Hatsuse Wakatakeru no Mikoto	Inaccurate dates.
22	480–484		Emperor Seinei	Siraka Takehiro Kuni Osi Waka Yamato Neko no Mikoto	Inaccurate dates.
23	485–487		Emperor Kenzō	Ohoke no Mikoto	Inaccurate dates.
24	488–498		Emperor Ninken	Ohosi(Ohosu) no Mikoto/ Simano Iratsuko	Inaccurate dates.
25	498–506		Emperor Buretsu	Wohatsuse Wakasazaki	Inaccurate dates.
26	507–531		Emperor Keitai	Ōto/Hikofuto (Hikofuto no Mikoto/Ōdo no Sumera Mikoto)	Genealogy from this point is considered accurate.
27	531–535		Emperor Ankan	Hirokuni Oshitake Kanahi no Mikoto	Inaccurate dates.
28	535–539		Emperor Senka	Takeo Hirokuni Oshitate no Mikoto	Inaccurate dates.
Asuka period (592–710)
29	539–571		Emperor Kinmei	Amekuni Oshiharuki Hironiwa no Sumera Mikoto	Traditional dates.
30	572–585		Emperor Bidatsu	Osada no Nunakura no Futotamashiki no Mikoto	Traditional dates.
31	585–587		Emperor Yōmei	Ooe/Tachibana no Toyohi no Sumera Mikoto	Traditional dates.
32	587–592		Emperor Sushun	Hatsusebe no (Wakasasagi) Mikoto	Traditional dates.
33	592–628		Empress Suiko	Nukatabe/Toyomike Kashikiyahime	First non-legendary female emperor (Prince Shotoku acted as her regent); traditional dates.
34	629–641		Emperor Jomei	Tamura (Oki Nagatarashihi Hironuka no Sumera Mikoto)	Traditional dates.
35	642–645		Empress Kōgyoku	Takara (Ame Toyotakaraikashi Hitarashi Hime no Sumera Mikoto)	Traditional dates, reigned twice
36	645–654		Emperor Kōtoku	Karu (Ame Yorozu Toyohi no Sumera Mikoto)	Traditional dates.
37	655–661		Empress Saimei	Takara (Ame Toyotakaraikashi Hitarashi Hime no Sumera Mikoto)	Second reign of Empress Kōgyoku (35), traditional dates.
38	661–672		Emperor Tenji	Katsuragi/Nakano-ooe (Ame Mikoto Hirakasuwake no Mikoto/Amatsu Mikoto Sakiwake no Mikoto)	Traditional dates.
39	672		Emperor Kōbun	Ōtomo	Posthumously named (1870), usurped by Temmu
40	672–686		Emperor Tenmu	Ōama/Ohoshiama/Ōsama (Ame no Nunahara Oki no Mahito no Sumera Mikoto)	Traditional dates.
41	686–697		Empress Jitō	Unonosarara (Takama no Harahiro no Hime no Sumera Mikoto)	Traditional dates.
42	697–707		Emperor Monmu	Karu (Ame no Mamune Toyoohoji no Sumera Mikoto)	Traditional dates.
43	707–715		Empress Genmei	Ahe (Yamatoneko Amatsu Mishiro Toyokuni Narihime no Sumera Mikoto)	Traditional dates.
Nara period (710–794)
43	707–715		Empress Genmei	Ahe (Yamatoneko Amatsu Mishiro Toyokuni Narihime no Sumera Mikoto)	Traditional dates.
44	715–724		Empress Genshō	Hidaka/Niinomi (Yamatoneko Takamizu Kiyotarashi Hime no Sumera Mikoto)	Traditional dates.
45	724–749		Emperor Shōmu	Obito (Ameshirushi Kunioshiharuki Toyosakurahiko no Sumera Mikoto)	Traditional dates.
46	749–758		Empress Kōken	Abe (Yamatoneko no Sumera Mikoto)	Traditional dates, reigned twice
47	758–764		Emperor Junnin	Ōi	Posthumously named (1870), dethroned by Shōtoku
48	764–770		Empress Shōtoku	Abe (Yamatoneko no Sumera Mikoto)	Second reign of Empress Kōken (46), traditional dates.
49	770–781		Emperor Kōnin	Shirakabe (Amemune Takatsugi no Mikoto)	Traditional dates.
50	781–806		Emperor Kanmu	Yamabe (Yamatoneko Amatsu Hitsugi Iyaderi no Mikoto)	Traditional dates.
Heian period (794–1185)
50	781–806		Emperor Kanmu	Yamabe (Yamatoneko Amatsu Hitsugi Iyaderi no Mikoto)	Traditional dates.
51	806–809		Emperor Heizei	Ate (Yamatoneko Ameoshikuni Takahiko no Mikoto)	Traditional dates.
52	809–823		Emperor Saga	Kamino	Traditional dates.
53	823–833		Emperor Junna	Ōtomo	Traditional dates.
54	833–850		Emperor Ninmyō	Masara	Traditional dates.
55	850–858		Emperor Montoku	Michiyasu	Traditional dates.
56	858–876		Emperor Seiwa	Korehito	Traditional dates.
57	876–884		Emperor Yōzei	Sadaakira	Traditional dates.
58	884–887		Emperor Kōkō	Tokiyasu	Traditional dates.
59	887–897		Emperor Uda	Sadami	Traditional dates.
60	897–930		Emperor Daigo	Atsuhito	Traditional dates.
61	930–946		Emperor Suzaku	Yutaakira	Traditional dates.
62	946–967		Emperor Murakami	Nariakira	Traditional dates.
63	967–969		Emperor Reizei	Norihira	Traditional dates.
64	969–984		Emperor En'yū	Morihira	Traditional dates.
65	984–986		Emperor Kazan	Morosada	Traditional dates.
66	986–1011		Emperor Ichijō	Yasuhito/Kanehito	Traditional dates.
67	1011–1016		Emperor Sanjō	Okisada/Iyasada	Traditional dates.
68	1016–1036		Emperor Go-Ichijō	Atsuhira	Traditional dates.
69	1036–1045		Emperor Go-Suzaku	Atsunaga/Atsuyoshi	Traditional dates.
70	1045–1068		Emperor Go-Reizei	Chikahito	Traditional dates.
71	1068–1073		Emperor Go-Sanjō	Takahito	Traditional dates.
72	1073–1086		Emperor Shirakawa	Sadahito	Traditional dates.
73	1087–1107		Emperor Horikawa	Taruhito	Traditional dates.
74	1107–1123		Emperor Toba	Munehito	Traditional dates.
75	1123–1142		Emperor Sutoku	Akihito	Traditional dates.
76	1142–1155		Emperor Konoe	Narihito	Traditional dates.
77	1155–1158		Emperor Go-Shirakawa	Masahito	Traditional dates.
78	1158–1165		Emperor Nijō	Morihito	Traditional dates.
79	1165–1168		Emperor Rokujō	Yorihito	Traditional dates.
80	1168–1180		Emperor Takakura	Norihito	Traditional dates.
81	1180–1185		Emperor Antoku	Tokihito	Traditional dates.
Kamakura period (1185–1333)
82	1183–1198		Emperor Go-Toba	Takahira	Traditional dates.
83	1198–1210		Emperor Tsuchimikado	Tamehito	Traditional dates.
84	1210–1221		Emperor Juntoku	Morihira/Morinari	Traditional dates.
85	1221		Emperor Chūkyō	Kanehira/Kanenari	Posthumously named (1870)
86	1221–1232		Emperor Go-Horikawa	Yutahito	Traditional dates.
87	1232–1242		Emperor Shijō	Mitsuhito/Hidehito	Traditional dates.
88	1242–1246		Emperor Go-Saga	Kunihito	Traditional dates.
89	1246–1260		Emperor Go-Fukakusa	Hisahito	Traditional dates.
90	1260–1274		Emperor Kameyama	Tsunehito	Traditional dates.
91	1274–1287		Emperor Go-Uda	Yohito	Traditional dates.
92	1287–1298		Emperor Fushimi	Hirohito	Traditional dates.
93	1298–1301		Emperor Go-Fushimi	Tanehito	Traditional dates.
94	1301–1308		Emperor Go-Nijō	Kuniharu	Traditional dates.
95	1308–1318		Emperor Hanazono	Tomihito	Traditional dates.
96	1318–1339		Emperor Go-Daigo	Takaharu	Traditional dates; Southern Court
Northern Court (1333–1392)
	1331–1333		Emperor Kōgon	Kazuhito	
	1336–1348		Emperor Kōmyō	Yutahito	
	1348–1351		Emperor Sukō	Okihito	
	1351–1352	Interregnum			
	1352–1371		Emperor Go-Kōgon	Iyahito	
	1371–1382		Emperor Go-En'yū	Ohito	
	1382–1392		Emperor Go-Komatsu	Motohito	Reunified courts in 1392, see 100 below
Muromachi period (1333–1573)
96	1318–1339		Emperor Go-Daigo	Takaharu	Traditional dates; Southern Court
97	1339–1368		Emperor Go-Murakami	Norinaga/Noriyoshi	Southern Court
98	1368–1383		Emperor Chōkei	Yutanari	Southern Court
99	1383–1392		Emperor Go-Kameyama	Hironari	Southern Court
100	1392–1412		Emperor Go-Komatsu	Motohito	Reunified courts, see also entry in Northern Court section.
101	1412–1428		Emperor Shōkō	Mihito	Traditional dates.
102	1428–1464		Emperor Go-Hanazono	Hikohito	Traditional dates.
103	1464–1500		Emperor Go-Tsuchimikado	Fusahito	Traditional dates.
104	1500–1526		Emperor Go-Kashiwabara	Katsuhito	Traditional dates.
105	1526–1557		Emperor Go-Nara	Tomohito	Traditional dates.
106	1557–1586		Emperor Ōgimachi	Michihito	Traditional dates.
Azuchi-Momoyama period (1573–1603)
106	1557–1586		Emperor Ōgimachi	Michihito	Traditional dates.
107	1586–1611		Emperor Go-Yōzei	Kazuhito/Katahito	Traditional dates.
Edo period (1603–1868)
107	1586–1611		Emperor Go-Yōzei	Kazuhito/Katahito	Traditional dates.
108	1611–1629		Emperor Go-Mizunoo (Go-Minoo)	Kotohito	Traditional dates.
109	1629–1643		Empress Meishō	Okiko	Traditional dates.
110	1643–1654		Emperor Go-Kōmyō	Tsuguhito	Traditional dates.
111	1655–1663		Emperor Go-Sai	Nagahito	Traditional dates.
112	1663–1687		Emperor Reigen	Satohito	Traditional dates.
113	1687–1709		Emperor Higashiyama	Asahito	Traditional dates.
114	1709–1735		Emperor Nakamikado	Yasuhito	Traditional dates.
115	1735–1747		Emperor Sakuramachi	Teruhito	Traditional dates.
116	1747–1762		Emperor Momozono	Toohito	Traditional dates.
117	1762–1771		Empress Go-Sakuramachi	Toshiko	Traditional dates.
118	1771–1779		Emperor Go-Momozono	Hidehito	Traditional dates.
119	1780–1817		Emperor Kōkaku	Tomohito	Traditional dates.
120	1817–1846		Emperor Ninkō	Ayahito	Traditional dates.
121	1846–1867		Emperor Kōmei	Osahito	
Modern Japan (Imperial and Postwar) (1867–present)
122	1867–1912		Emperor Meiji	Mutsuhito	First Emperor of the Empire of Japan.
123	1912–1926		Emperor Taishō	Yoshihito	Crown Prince Hirohito served as Sesshō (Prince Regent) 1921–1926.
124	1926–1989		Emperor Shōwa	Hirohito	Served as Sesshō (Prince Regent) 1921–1926. Last Emperor of the Empire of Japan.
125	1989–2019		Emperor Akihito	Akihito	Referred to as 'the Emperor Emeritus' or Daijō Tennō (i.e. His Majesty the Emperor Emeritus) in Japanese and as Emperor Akihito in English. His posthumous name is likely to be Emperor Heisei. He abdicated in 2019 in favor of his eldest son Naruhito. He was the first monarch since Emperor Kōkaku to do so.
126	2019–present		Emperor "Kinjō" (Reigning monarch)	Naruhito	Referred to as 'the Present Emperor' or Tenno Heika (i.e. His Majesty the Emperor) in Japanese and as Emperor Naruhito in English. His posthumous name is likely to be Emperor Reiwa.

== Historians ==
- Saburo Ienaga
- Nobuo Kanda
- Masao Maruyama
- Naitō Torajirō
- Ikuhiko Hata
- Shinichi Kitaoka
- Kan Kimura
- Ichirō Inaba
- Naoki Inose

== Military leaders ==
=== Samurai ===
==== A ====
- Abe Masakatsu
- Adachi Kagemori
- William Adams (foreign born)
- Akao Kiyotsuna
- Akechi Mitsuhide
- Akiyama Nobutomo
- Amago Haruhisa
- Amago Yoshihisa
  - See also Amago clan
- Ankokuji Ekei
- Aochi Shigetsuna
- Arai Hakuseki
- Araki Murashige
- Arima Kihei
- Asakura Yoshikage
- Azai Hisamasa
- Azai Nagamasa
- Azai Sukemasa

==== B ====
- Baba Nobufusa
- Bessho Nagaharu

==== C ====
- Chōsokabe Morichika
- Chōsokabe Kunichika
- Chōsokabe Motochika
- Chōsokabe Nobuchika
- Collache, Eugène

==== D ====
- Date Masamune
  - See also Date clan
- Doi Toshikatsu

==== E ====
- Endō Naotsune
- Enomoto Takeaki

==== F ====
- Fūma Kotarō
- Fuwa Mitsuharu
- Fujiwara no Hidesato (Tawara no Tōda)
- Fukushima Masanori

==== G ====
- Gamō Katahide
- Gamō Ujisato

==== H ====
- Hasekura Tsunenaga
- Hattori Hanzō
- Hatano Hideharu
- Hirate Masahide
- Hitotsubashi Keiki
- Hōjō Masako
- Hōjō Tokimune
- Hōjō Ujiyasu
- Hōjō Ujimasa
- Honda Tadakatsu
- Honda Komatsu (Inahime)
- Honganji Kennyo
- Hosokawa Fujitaka
- Hosokawa Gracia
- Hosokawa Tadaoki
- Hotta Masatoshi

==== I ====
- Ii Naomasa
- Ii Naomori
- Ii Naosuke
- Ii Naotaka
- Ii Naoyuki
- Iizasa Ienao
- Ijuin Tada'aki
- Imagawa Yoshimoto
- Imai Kanehira
- Ishida Mitsunari
- Itagaki Nobukata
- Itagaki Taisuke
- Itō Hirobumi
- Iwanari Tomomichi

==== K ====
- Kaneko Ietada
- Katagiri Katsumoto
- Katō Kiyomasa
- Kawakami Gensai
- Kido Takayoshi
- Kikkawa Hiroie
- Kimotsuki Kanetsugu
- Kobayakawa Hideaki
- Kobayakawa Hidekane
- Kobayakawa Takakage
- Kojima Toyoharu
- Kuroda Denta
- Kuroda Kanbei Don Sim(e)on Josui Yoshitaka
- Kuroda Kiyotaka
- Kusunoki Masashige
- Kumagai Naozane

==== M ====
- Maeda Keiji
- Maeda Nagatane
- Maeda Toshiie
- Maeda Toshinaga
- Maeda Toshitsune
- Manabe Akifusa
- Matsudaira Nobutsuna
- Matsudaira Nobuyasu
- Matsudaira Higo no Kami Katamori
- Matsudaira Sadanobu
- Matsudaira Tadayoshi
- Matsudaira Teru
- Matsunaga Hisahide
- Matsuo Bashō
- Matsudaira Motoyasu
- Minamoto no Mitsunaka
- Minamoto no Yoshiie
- Minamoto no Yoshimitsu
- Minamoto no Yoshinaka
- Minamoto no Yoshitomo
- Minamoto no Yoshitsune
- Minamoto no Tameyoshi
- Minamoto no Yorimasa
- Minamoto no Yorimitsu
- Minamoto no Yoritomo
- Minamoto no Noriyori
- Mirei Kiritani
- Miura Anjin
- Miura Yoshimoto
- Miyamoto Musashi
- Miyoshi Chōkei
- Miyoshi Yoshitsugu
- Mizuno Tadakuni
- Mōri Motonari
- Mori Nagayoshi
- Mōri Okimoto
- Mori Ranmaru
- Mōri Takamoto
- Mōri Terumoto
- Mori Yoshinari

==== N ====
- Nagakura Shinpachi
- Nagao Harukage
- Nagao Masakage
- Nagao Tamekage
- Naoe Kanetsugu
- Nakagawa Kiyohide
- Naoe Kagetsuna
- Naoe Kanetsugu
- Nihonmatsu Yoshitsugu
- Niimi Nishiki
- Niiro Tadamoto
- Niwa Nagahide
- Niwa Nagashige

==== O ====
- Oda Nobuhide
- Oda Nobunaga
- Oda Nobutada
- Oda Nobutomo
- Oda Nobukatsu
- Ogasawara Shōsai
- Ōishi Kuranosuke
- Okada Izō
- Judge Ōoka
- Ōta Dōkan
- Ōtomo Sōrin
- Okita Sōji
- Ōkubo Toshimichi
- Ōuchi Yoshitaka

==== R ====
- Rokkaku Yoshitaka
- Rusu Masakage
- Ryūzōji Takanobu
  - See also Ryūzōji clan

==== S ====
- Saigo Kiyokazu
- Sagara Taketō
- Saigō Takamori
- Saigō Yoshikatsu
- Saitō Dōsan
- Saitō Hajime
- Saitō Yoshitatsu
- Sakai Tadakiyo
- Sakai Tadashige
- Sakai Tadayo
- Sakamoto Ryōma
- Sakuma Morimasa
- Sakuma Nobumori
- Sanada Masayuki
- Sanada Nobuyuki
- Sanada Yukimura
- Sasaki Kojirō
- Sasaki Yoshikiyo
- Serizawa Kamo
- Shibata Katsuie
- Shima Sakon
- Shimada Ichirō
- Shimazu Katsuhisa
- Shimazu Tadahisa
- Shimazu Tadatsune
- Shimazu Tadayoshi
- Shimazu Takahisa
- Shimazu Yoshihiro
- Shimazu Yoshihisa
- Sue Yoshitaka

==== T ====
- Tachibana Muneshige
- Tachibana Dōsetsu
- Tachibana Ginchiyo
- Taigen Sessai
- Taira no Kiyomori
- Taira no Masakado
- Takahashi Shigetane
- Takenaka Shigeharu
- Takaoka Muneyasu
- Takasugi Shinsaku
- Takayama Justo (Shigetomo)
- Takayama Ukon
- Takechi Hanpeita
- Takeda Katsuyori
- Takeda Nobushige
- Takeda Shingen
- Tani Tateki
- Toki Yorinari
- Tokugawa Ieyasu
- Tokugawa Hidetada
- Tokugawa Nariaki
- Tokugawa Yoshinobu
- Toyotomi Hideyoshi
- Toyotomi Hideyori
- Tozuka Tadaharu
- Tsukahara Bokuden

==== U ====
- Uesugi Kagekatsu
- Uesugi Kagetora
- Uesugi Kenshin
- Ukita Naoie
- Umezawa Michiharu
- Usami Sadamitsu

==== W ====
- Watanabe Kazan
- Watanabe no Tsuna

==== Y ====
- Yagyū Jūbei Mitsuyoshi
- Yamada Arinaga
- Yamada Arinobu
- Yamada Nagamasa
- Yamagata Masakage
- Yamanami Keisuke
- Yanagisawa Yoshiyasu
- Yonekura Shigetsugu
- Yagyū Munenori
- Yamauchi Kazutoyo
- Yūki Hideyasu

=== Kamakura shōguns ===
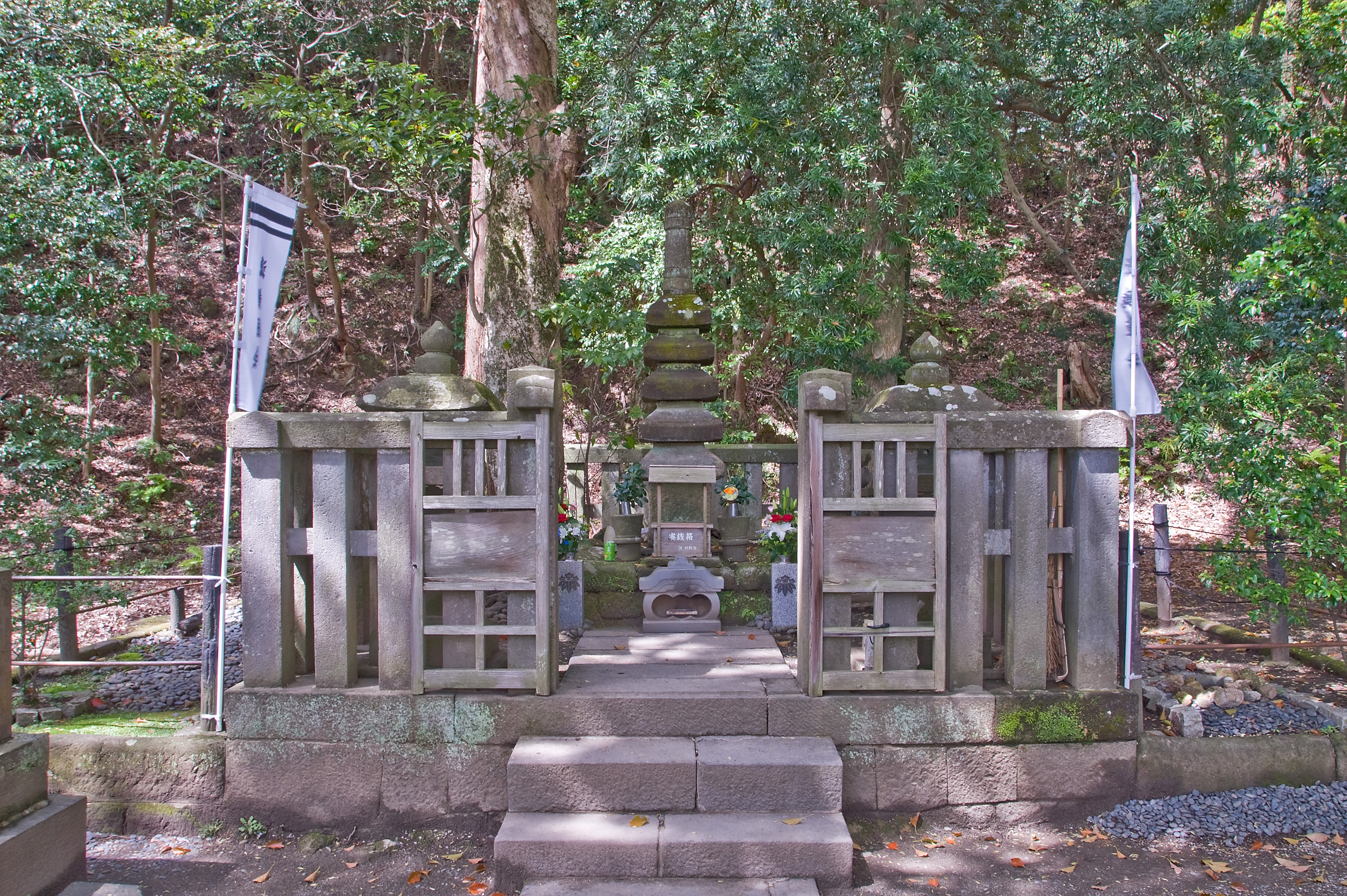
Grave of Minamoto no Yoritomo

1. Minamoto no Yoritomo, r. 1192–1199
2. Minamoto no Yoriie, r. 1202–1203
3. Minamoto no Sanetomo, r. 1203–1219
4. Kujō Yoritsune, r. 1226–1244
5. Kujō Yoritsugu, r. 1244–1252
6. Prince Munetaka, r. 1252–1266
7. Prince Koreyasu, r. 1266–1289
8. Prince Hisaakira, r. 1289–1308
9. Prince Morikuni, r. 1308–1333
10. Prince Morinaga, r.1333–1334
11. Prince Norinaga, r. 1334–1338

==== Kamakura shikken ====
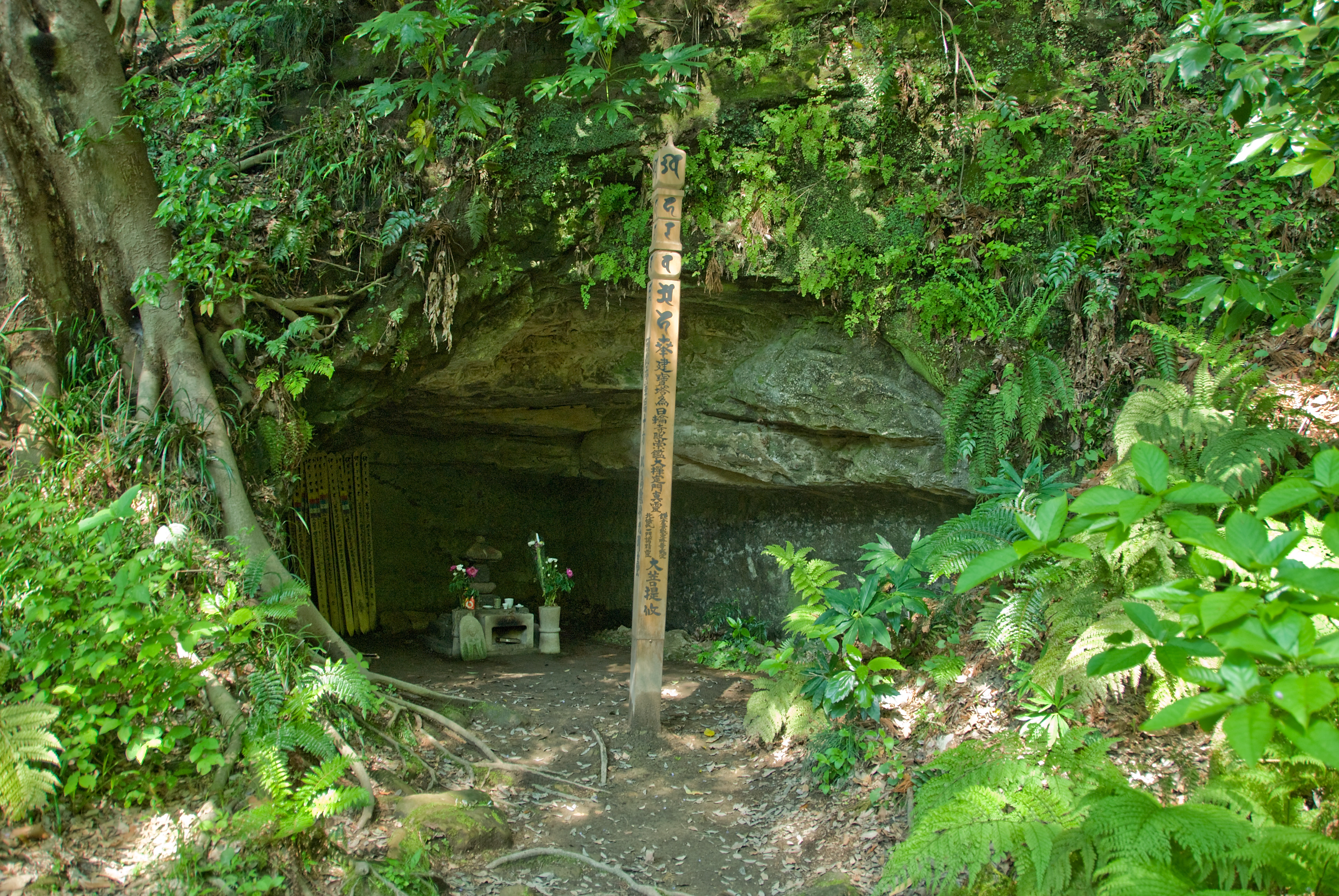
Site of Hōjō Takatoki's death

1. Hōjō Tokimasa, r. 1203–1205
2. Hōjō Yoshitoki, r. 1205–1224
3. Hōjō Yasutoki, r. 1224–1242
4. Hōjō Tsunetoki, r. 1242–1246
5. Hōjō Tokiyori, r. 1246–1256
6. Hōjō Tokimune, r. 1268–1284
7. Hōjō Sadatoki, r. 1284–1301
8. Hōjō Morotoki, r. 1301–1311
9. Hōjō Takatoki, r. 1316–1326

=== Ashikaga shōguns ===
1. Ashikaga Takauji, ruled 1338–1358
2. Ashikaga Yoshiakira, r. 1359–1368
3. Ashikaga Yoshimitsu, r. 1368–1394
4. Ashikaga Yoshimochi, r. 1395–1423
5. Ashikaga Yoshikazu, r. 1423–1425
6. Ashikaga Yoshinori, r. 1429–1441
7. Ashikaga Yoshikatsu, r. 1442–1443
8. Ashikaga Yoshimasa, r. 1449–1473
9. Ashikaga Yoshihisa, r. 1474–1489
10. Ashikaga Yoshitane, r. 1490–1493, 1508–1521
11. Ashikaga Yoshizumi, r. 1494–1508
12. Ashikaga Yoshiharu, r. 1521–1546
13. Ashikaga Yoshiteru, r. 1546–1565
14. Ashikaga Yoshihide, r. 1568
15. Ashikaga Yoshiaki, r. 1568–1573

=== Tokugawa shōguns ===
Number	Tokugawas	Took office	Left office
1	Tokugawa Ieyasu	1603	1605
2	Tokugawa Hidetada	1605	1623
3	Tokugawa Iemitsu	1623	1651
4	Tokugawa Ietsuna	1651	1680
5	Tokugawa Tsunayoshi	1680	1709
6	Tokugawa Ienobu	1709	1712
7	Tokugawa Ietsugu	1713	1716
8	Tokugawa Yoshimune	1716	1745
9	Tokugawa Ieshige	1745	1760
10	Tokugawa Ieharu	1760	1786
11	Tokugawa Ienari	1786	1837
12	Tokugawa Ieyoshi	1837	1853
13	Tokugawa Iesada	1853	August 14, 1858
14	Tokugawa Iemochi	August 14, 1858	August 29, 1866
15	Tokugawa Yoshinobu	August 29, 1866	November 19, 1867

Over the course of the Edo period, influential relatives of the shōgun included:

- Tokugawa Mitsukuni of the Mito domain
- Tokugawa Nariaki of the Mito domain
- Tokugawa Mochiharu of the Hitotsubashi branch
- Tokugawa Munetake of the Tayasu branch.
- Matsudaira Katamori of the Aizu branch.
- Matsudaira Sadanobu, born into the Tayasu branch, adopted into the Hisamatsu-Matsudaira of Shirakawa.

=== Pre-modern ===
==== Emperors ====
- Emperor Jinmu
- Emperor Kōbun
- Emperor Tenmu
- Emperor Go-Toba
- Emperor Go-Daigo

==== Commanders from loyal family ====
- Kibitsuhiko-no-mikoto
- Yamato Takeru
- Empress Jingū

==== Commanders in Thirty-Eight Years' War ====
- Ōtomo no Otomaro
- Sakanoue no Tamuramaro
- Aterui

=== Modern ===
- Anami Korechika
- Doihara Kenji
- Enomoto Takeaki
- Kuroki Itei (Kuroki Tamemoto)
- Matsui Iwane
- Ōta Minoru
- Suzuki Kantarō
- Tōgō Heihachirō
- Tōjō Hideki
- Yamamoto Isoroku
- Shiro Kawase
- Ishiwara Kanji

== Personalities ==
=== Idols (male) ===
- Daiki Arioka
- Goro Inagaki
- Hikaru Yaotome
- Hiroki Uchi
- Jin Akanishi
- Jun Matsumoto
- Junnosuke Taguchi
- Junichi Okada
- Kanata Hongō
- Katori Shingo
- Kazunari Ninomiya
- Kazuya Kamenashi
- Kei Inoo
- Keiichiro Koyama
- Keita Tachibana
- Keito Okamoto
- Kimura Takuya
- Koichi Domoto
- Koike Teppei
- Kota Yabu
- Kusano Hironori
- Masahiro Nakai
- Masaki Aiba
- Ryutaro Morimoto
- Shingo Murakami
- Ryo Nishikido
- Ryohei Chiba
- Ryuichi Ogata
- Ryosuke Yamada
- Satoshi Ohno
- Shigeaki Kato
- Shingo Murakami
- Sho Sakurai
- Shota Yasuda
- Subaru Shibutani
- Takahisa Masuda
- Tanaka Koki
- Tatsuya Ueda
- Tsuyoshi Domoto
- Tsuyoshi Kusanagi
- Tomohisa Yamashita
- Toma Ikuta
- Yu Yokoyama
- Yuichi Nakamaru
- Yuma Nakayama
- Yuto Nakajima
- Yuuri Chinen
- Yuya Tegoshi
- Yuya Takaki

=== Idols (female) ===
- Sayaka Akimoto
- Rina Akiyama
- Tsugumi Aritomo
- Momoka Ariyasu
- Kano Fujihira
- Mizuki Fukumura
- Yui Hiwatashi
- Haruna Iikubo
- Erina Ikuta
- Ayumi Ishida
- Tomomi Itano
- Tomomi Kasai
- Yuki Kashiwagi
- Umika Kawashima
- Rie Kitahara
- Eiko Koike
- Haruna Kojima
- Haruka Kudo
- Koharu Kusumi
- Atsuko Maeda
- Erina Mano
- Jurina Matsui
- Rena Matsui
- Aya Matsuura
- Sayumi Michishige
- Minami Minegishi
- Kanako Momota
- Momoe Mori
- Haruka Nakagawa
- Shoko Nakagawa
- Chise Nakamura
- Jun Natsukawa
- Yuko Oshima
- Ayaka Sasaki
- Masaki Sato
- Riho Sayashi
- Rino Sashihara
- Mariko Shinoda
- Kanon Suzuki
- Reni Takagi
- Aki Takajo
- Minami Takahashi
- Shiori Tamai
- Takako Uehara
- Aya Ueto
- Mayu Watanabe
- Azusa Yamamoto
- Soyoka Yoshida

=== Models ===
- Seika Furuhata
- Kanata Hongō
- Aki Hoshino
- May J.
- Meisa Kuroki
- Riyo Mori
- Suzuka Morita
- Mariya Nishiuchi
- Fujiwara Norika
- Tao Okamoto
- Oshikiri Moe
- Umemiya Anna
- Inoue Waka
- Yamada Yu
- Ebihara Yuri

=== Musicians and singers (male) ===
- Eiichi Ohtaki
- Eikichi Yazawa
- Gackt
- Haruomi Hosono
- hide
- Hiromi Go
- Kiyoshiro Imawano
- Hideaki Tokunaga
- Hyde
- Kazumasa Oda
- Keisuke Kuwata
- Koshi Inaba
- Kōji Tamaki
- Kyosuke Himuro
- Miyavi
- Noriyuki Makihara
- Ryuichi Sakamoto
- Saijo Hideki
- Takanori Nishikawa
- Tamio Okuda
- Tatsuya Ishii
- Tatsuro Yamashita
- Tomoyasu Hotei
- Toshi Kubota
- Toshiki Kadomatsu
- Yasuyuki Okamura
- Yoshiki
- Yōsui Inoue
- Yukihiro Takahashi

=== Musicians and singers (female) ===
- Ai Otsuka
- Ai Takahashi
- Aiko Kayō
- Akiko Wada
- Alisa Durbrow
- Angela Aki
- Anna Tsuchiya
- Airi Suzuki
- Aya Hirano
- Aya Matsuura
- Aya Ueto
- Ayaka Hirahara
- Ayaka Komatsu
- Ayaka
- Ayumi Hamasaki
- Ayumi Kinoshita
- Beni Arashiro
- Bonnie Pink
- Chiaki Kuriyama
- Chihiro Onitsuka
- Chisaki Hama
- Chitose Hajime
- Crystal Kay
- Erika Sawajiri
- Emi Hinouchi
- Emi Maria
- Eri Ito
- Emyli
- Garnet Crow
- Goto Maki
- Hagiwara Mai
- Halna
- Hikaru Nishida
- Hiro
- Hiroko Anzai
- Hiroko Shimabukuro
- Hitomi
- Ikue Sakakibara
- Imai Eriko
- JASMINE
- Jhené Aiko
- Jun Natsukawa
- Junko Sakurada
- JYONGRI
- Kanako Enomoto
- Kanbe Miyuki
- Kanon Wakeshima
- Kawabe Chieco
- Kawase Tomoko
- Keiko Kitagawa
- Kumi Koda
- Kusumi Koharu
- Lia
- Maaya Sakamoto
- Maeda Atsuko
- May J.
- Mari Amachi
- Masako Mori
- Meisa Kuroki
- Megumi Odaka
- Megumi
- Megumi Hayashibara
- Melody.
- Mew Azama
- Mihiro Taniguchi
- Miho Komatsu
- Miho Nakayama
- Miki Fujimoto
- Miki Jinbo
- Miliyah Kato
- MINMI
- Miyuu Sawai
- Mizuki Nana
- Momoe Yamaguchi
- Myco
- Mika Nakashima
- Namie Amuro
- Natsuyaki Miyabi
- Noriko Sakai
- Reina Tanaka
- Reon Kadena
- Ribbon
- Ryōko Hirosue
- Saori Minami
- Sayaka
- Sayumi Michishige
- Seiko Matsuda
- Shoko Nakagawa
- Takako Ōta
- Takako Uehara
- Thelma Aoyama
- Toko Yasuda
- Tomomi Itano
- Tsugunaga Momoko
- Hikaru Utada
- Waka Inoue
- Yui
- Yui Makino
- Yukiko Okada
- Yuko Ogura
- Yuna Ito

=== Tarento ===
- Aya Ueto
- Becky
- Kazushige Nagashima
- Kano sisters
- Matt Kuwata
- Mina Fukui
- Momoiro Clover Z
- Naomi Watanabe
- Roland (Japanese host)

=== TV and radio personalities ===
- Iijima Ai
- Mao Inoue
- Kano sisters
- Sugita Kaoru
- Mino Monta
- Shinohara Tomoe

=== Others ===
- Kurihara Harumi
- Ghib Ojisan
- Papaya Suzuki
- Rina Gonoi

== Prime Ministers ==
=== Meiji period (1868–1912) ===
Prime Ministers of Emperor Meiji

No.	Prime Minister		Term of office			Political Party	Government	Elected	Ref
No.	Portrait	Name	Took office	Left office	Days	Political Party	Government	Elected	Ref
1		Itō Hirobumi 伊藤 博文; Itō Hirobumi (1841–1909)	22 December 1885	30 April 1888	860	None	1. Itō I	—	
1		Itō Hirobumi 伊藤 博文; Itō Hirobumi (1841–1909)	The first Prime Minister of the Empire of Japan.						
2		Kuroda Kiyotaka 黑田 清隆; Kuroda Kiyotaka (1840–1900)	30 April 1888	25 October 1889	543	None	2. Kuroda	—	
2		Kuroda Kiyotaka 黑田 清隆; Kuroda Kiyotaka (1840–1900)	Oversaw promulgation of the Meiji Constitution. Failed to secure revision of the unequal treaties; resigned.						
—		Sanjō Sanetomi 三條 實美; Sanjō Sanetomi (1837–1891)	25 October 1889	24 December 1889	60	None	Sanjō (interim)	—	
—		Sanjō Sanetomi 三條 實美; Sanjō Sanetomi (1837–1891)	Upon the resignation of Kuroda’s government, the Emperor only accepted Kuroda’s resignation and invited Sanjō to head the government for two more months. Today, however, Sanjō’s government is generally regarded as a continuation of Kuroda’s. Held concurrently by the Lord Keeper of the Privy Seal.						
3		Yamagata Aritomo 山縣 有朋; Yamagata Aritomo (1838–1922)	24 December 1889	6 May 1891	498	None	3. Yamagata I	1890	
4		Matsukata Masayoshi 松方 正義; Matsukata Masayoshi (1835–1924)	6 May 1891	8 August 1892	460	None	4. Matsukata I	1892	
(1)		Itō Hirobumi 伊藤 博文; Itō Hirobumi (1841–1909)	8 August 1892	31 August 1896	1484	None	5. Itō II	Mar. 1894; Sept. 1894	
(1)		Itō Hirobumi 伊藤 博文; Itō Hirobumi (1841–1909)	Resigned.						
During this interval, Privy Council Chairman Kuroda Kiyotaka (黑田 清隆 Kuroda Kiyotaka) was the acting prime minister.
(4)		Matsukata Masayoshi 松方 正義; Matsukata Masayoshi (1835–1924)	18 September 1896	12 January 1898	481	None	6. Matsukata II	—	
(1)		Itō Hirobumi 伊藤 博文; Itō Hirobumi (1841–1909)	12 January 1898	30 June 1898	169	None	7. Itō III	Mar. 1898	
5		Ōkuma Shigenobu 大隈 重信; Ōkuma Shigenobu (1838–1922)	30 June 1898	8 November 1898	131	Kenseitō	8. Ōkuma I	Sept. 1898	
(3)		Yamagata Aritomo 山縣 有朋; Yamagata Aritomo (1838–1922)	8 November 1898	19 October 1900	710	None	9. Yamagata II	—	
(1)		Itō Hirobumi 伊藤 博文; Itō Hirobumi (1841–1909)	19 October 1900	10 May 1901	203	Rikken Seiyūkai	10. Itō IV	—	
(1)		Itō Hirobumi 伊藤 博文; Itō Hirobumi (1841–1909)	Resigned.						
During this interval, Privy Council Chairman Saionji Kinmochi (西園寺 公望 Saionji Kinmochi) was the acting prime minister.
6		Katsura Tarō 桂 太郎; Katsura Tarō (1848–1913)	2 June 1901	7 January 1906	1680	None (Retired General)	11. Katsura I	1902; 1903; 1904	
7		Saionji Kinmochi 西園寺 公望; Saionji Kinmochi (1849–1940)	7 January 1906	14 July 1908	919	Rikken Seiyūkai	12. Saionji I	1908	
(6)		Katsura Tarō 桂 太郎; Katsura Tarō (1848–1913)	14 July 1908	30 August 1911	1142	None (Retired General)	13. Katsura II	—	
(7)		Saionji Kinmochi 西園寺 公望; Saionji Kinmochi (1849–1940)	30 August 1911	21 December 1912	479	Rikken Seiyūkai	14. Saionji II	1912	

=== Taishō period (1912–1926) ===
Prime Ministers of Emperor Taishō

No.	Prime Minister		Term of office			Political Party	Government	Elected	Ref
No.	Portrait	Name	Took office	Left office	Days	Political Party	Government	Elected	Ref
(6)		Katsura Tarō 桂 太郎; Katsura Tarō (1848–1913)	21 December 1912	20 February 1913	61	None (Retired General)	15. Katsura III	—	
8		Yamamoto Gonnohyōe 山本 權兵衛; Yamamoto Gonnohyōe (1852–1933)	20 February 1913	16 April 1914	420	Military (Navy)	16. Yamamoto I	—	
(5)		Ōkuma Shigenobu 大隈 重信; Ōkuma Shigenobu (1838–1922)	16 April 1914	9 October 1916	907	Rikken Dōshikai	17. Ōkuma II	1915	
9		Terauchi Masatake 寺内 正毅; Terauchi Masatake (1852–1919)	9 October 1916	29 September 1918	720	Military (Army)	18. Terauchi	1917	
10		Hara Takashi 原 敬 Hara Takashi (1856–1921)	29 September 1918	4 November 1921	1132	Rikken Seiyūkai	19. Hara	1920	
10		Hara Takashi 原 敬 Hara Takashi (1856–1921)	Assassinated.						
During this interval, Foreign Minister Uchida Kosai (内田 康哉 Uchida Kōsai) was the acting prime minister.
11		Takahashi Korekiyo 高橋 是清; Takahashi Korekiyo (1854–1936)	13 November 1921	12 June 1922	220	Rikken Seiyūkai	20. Takahashi	—	
12		Katō Tomosaburō 加藤 友三郎; Katō Tomosaburō (1861–1923)	12 June 1922	24 August 1923	438	Military (Navy)	21. Katō To.	—	
12		Katō Tomosaburō 加藤 友三郎; Katō Tomosaburō (1861–1923)	Died in office of natural causes.						
During this interval, Foreign Minister Uchida Kosai (内田 康哉 Uchida Kōsai) was the acting prime minister.
(8)		Yamamoto Gonnohyōe 山本 權兵衛; Yamamoto Gonnohyōe (1852–1933)	2 September 1923	7 January 1924	125	Military (Navy)	22. Yamamoto II	—	
13		Kiyoura Keigo 清浦 奎吾; Kiyoura Keigo (1850–1942)	7 January 1924	11 June 1924	156	None	23. Kiyoura	1924	
14		Katō Takaaki 加藤 高明; Katō Takaaki (1860–1926)	11 June 1924	2 August 1925	596	Kenseikai	24. Katō Ta.	—	
14		Katō Takaaki 加藤 高明; Katō Takaaki (1860–1926)	2 August 1925	28 January 1926	596	Kenseikai	24. Katō Ta.	—	
14		Katō Takaaki 加藤 高明; Katō Takaaki (1860–1926)	Resigned after the “Grand Coalition of the Three Pro-Constitution Parties” collapsed. Katō was then reinvited by the Prince Regent to form a new government with his own party, Kenseitō. Today, however, his second term is generally regarded as continuation of his first. Died in office of natural causes.						
During this interval, Interior Minister Wakatsuki Reijirō (若槻 禮次郎 Wakatsuki Reijirō) was the acting prime minister.
15		Wakatsuki Reijirō 若槻 禮次郎; Wakatsuki Reijirō (1866–1949)	30 January 1926	20 April 1927	445	Kenseikai	25. Wakatsuki I	—	

=== Shōwa period under 1890 Constitution (1926–1947) ===
Prime Ministers of Emperor Shōwa under 1890 Constitution

No.	Prime Minister		Term of office			Political Party	Government	Elected	Ref
No.	Portrait	Name	Took office	Left office	Days	Political Party	Government	Elected	Ref
16		Tanaka Giichi 田中 義一; Tanaka Giichi (1864–1929)	20 April 1927	2 July 1929	804	Rikken Seiyūkai	26. Tanaka G.	1928	
17		Osachi Hamaguchi 濱口 雄幸; Hamaguchi Osachi (1870–1931)	2 July 1929	14 April 1931	651	Rikken Minseitō	27. Hamaguchi	1930	
17		Osachi Hamaguchi 濱口 雄幸; Hamaguchi Osachi (1870–1931)	Incapacitated due to serious wound from assassination plot on 14 November 1930. Foreign Minister Shidehara Kijūrō served as Deputy Prime Minister until Hamaguchi’s return to the office on 10 March 1931.						
(15)		Wakatsuki Reijirō 若槻 禮次郎; Wakatsuki Reijirō (1866–1949)	14 April 1931	13 December 1931	243	Rikken Minseitō	28. Wakatsuki II	—	
18		Inukai Tsuyoshi 犬養 毅 Inukai Tsuyoshi (1855–1932)	13 December 1931	15 May 1932	154	Rikken Seiyūkai	29. Inukai	1932	
18		Inukai Tsuyoshi 犬養 毅 Inukai Tsuyoshi (1855–1932)	Assassinated.						
During this interval, Finance Minister Takahashi Korekiyo (高橋 是清 Takahashi Korekiyo) was the acting prime minister.
19		Saitō Makoto 齋藤 實 Saitō Makoto (1858–1936)	26 May 1932	8 July 1934	773	Military (Navy)	30. Saitō	—	
20		Keisuke Okada 岡田 啓介; Okada Keisuke (1868–1952)	8 July 1934	9 March 1936	610	Military (Navy)	31. Okada	1936	
20		Keisuke Okada 岡田 啓介; Okada Keisuke (1868–1952)	Thought to be killed by renegade soldiers during the February 26 Incident. Interior Minister Gotō Fumio served as Deputy Prime Minister until Okada was found alive on 28 February 1936.						
21		Kōki Hirota 廣田 弘毅; Hirota Kōki (1878–1948)	9 March 1936	2 February 1937	330	None	32. Hirota	—	
22		Senjūrō Hayashi 林 銑十郎; Hayashi Senjūrō (1876–1943)	2 February 1937	4 June 1937	122	Military (Army)	33. Hayashi	1937	
23		Fumimaro Konoe 近衞 文麿; Konoe Fumimaro (1891–1945)	4 June 1937	5 January 1939	580	None	34. Konoe I	—	
24		Hiranuma Kiichirō 平沼 騏一郎; Hiranuma Kiichirō (1867–1952)	5 January 1939	30 August 1939	237	None	35. Hiranuma	—	
25		Nobuyuki Abe 阿部 信行; Abe Nobuyuki (1875–1953)	30 August 1939	16 January 1940	139	Military (Army)	36. Abe N.	—	
26		Mitsumasa Yonai 米内 光政; Yonai Mitsumasa (1880–1948)	16 January 1940	22 July 1940	188	Military (Navy)	37. Yonai	—	
(23)		Fumimaro Konoe 近衞 文麿; Konoe Fumimaro (1891–1945)	22 July 1940	18 July 1941	453	Taisei Yokusankai	38. Konoe II	—	
(23)		Fumimaro Konoe 近衞 文麿; Konoe Fumimaro (1891–1945)	18 July 1941	18 October 1941	453	Taisei Yokusankai	39. Konoe III	—	
27		Hideki Tōjō 東條 英機; Tōjō Hideki (1884–1948)	18 October 1941	22 July 1944	1008	Taisei Yokusankai	40. Tōjō	1942	
28		Kuniaki Koiso 小磯 國昭; Koiso Kuniaki (1880–1950)	22 July 1944	7 April 1945	259	Military (Army)	41. Koiso	—	
29		Kantarō Suzuki 鈴木 貫太郎; Suzuki Kantarō (1868–1948)	7 April 1945	17 August 1945	132	Taisei Yokusankai	42. Suzuki K.	—	
30		Higashikuni Naruhiko 東久邇宮 稔彦 王 Higashikuni no miya Naruhiko ō (1887–1990)	17 August 1945	9 October 1945	53	Imperial Family	43. Higashikuni	—	
30		Higashikuni Naruhiko 東久邇宮 稔彦 王 Higashikuni no miya Naruhiko ō (1887–1990)	The only member of the Imperial Family to serve as Prime Minister.						
31		Kijūrō Shidehara 幣原 喜重郎; Shidehara Kijūrō (1872–1951)	9 October 1945	22 May 1946	225	None	44. Shidehara	—	
32		Shigeru Yoshida 吉田 茂 Yoshida Shigeru (1878–1967)	22 May 1946	24 May 1947	367	Japan Liberal	45. Yoshida I	1946	

=== Shōwa period under 1947 Constitution (1947–1989) ===
Prime Ministers of Emperor Shōwa under 1947 Constitution

No.	Prime Minister		Term of office			Political Party	Government	Elected		Ref
No.	Portrait	Name (Birth–Death)	Took office	Left office	Days	Political Party	Government	Gen.	Coun.	Ref
33		Tetsu Katayama 片山 哲 Katayama Tetsu (1887–1978); Rep for Kanagawa 3rd	24 May 1947	10 March 1948	291	JSP; Nihon Shakaitō	46. Katayama; JSP–DP–PCP	1947	1947	
33		Tetsu Katayama 片山 哲 Katayama Tetsu (1887–1978); Rep for Kanagawa 3rd	Under Allied Occupation. The first prime minister and the first socialist to serve as Prime Minister of Japan. Member of Diet from 1930 to 1963. Formed a coalition government with the Democratic Party and the National Cooperative Party.							
34		Hitoshi Ashida 芦田 均 Ashida Hitoshi (1887–1959); Rep for Kyōto 2nd	10 March 1948	15 October 1948	219	DP; Minshutō	47. Ashida; DP–JSP–PCP	—	—	
34		Hitoshi Ashida 芦田 均 Ashida Hitoshi (1887–1959); Rep for Kyōto 2nd	Under Allied Occupation. Ashida's cabinet resigned after seven months in office, due to alleged ministerial corruption in the Showa Electric scandal.							
(32)		Shigeru Yoshida 吉田 茂 Yoshida Shigeru (1878–1967); Rep for Kōchi at-large	15 October 1948	16 February 1949	2247	DLP; Minshu Jiyūtō (until 1950); Liberal; Jiyūtō	48. Yoshida II; DLP	—	—	
(32)		Shigeru Yoshida 吉田 茂 Yoshida Shigeru (1878–1967); Rep for Kōchi at-large	16 February 1949	30 October 1952	2247	DLP; Minshu Jiyūtō (until 1950); Liberal; Jiyūtō	49. Yoshida III; (Reshuffle 1 · 2 · 3); DLP/Liberal–DP	1949	1950	
(32)		Shigeru Yoshida 吉田 茂 Yoshida Shigeru (1878–1967); Rep for Kōchi at-large	30 October 1952	21 May 1953	2247	DLP; Minshu Jiyūtō (until 1950); Liberal; Jiyūtō	50. Yoshida IV; Liberal	1952	—	
(32)		Shigeru Yoshida 吉田 茂 Yoshida Shigeru (1878–1967); Rep for Kōchi at-large	21 May 1953	10 December 1954	2247	DLP; Minshu Jiyūtō (until 1950); Liberal; Jiyūtō	51. Yoshida V Liberal	1953	1953	
(32)		Shigeru Yoshida 吉田 茂 Yoshida Shigeru (1878–1967); Rep for Kōchi at-large	Under Allied Occupation until the Treaty of San Francisco came into force on 28 April 1952. Developed the Yoshida Doctrine, prioritising economic development and reliance on United States military protection.							
35		Ichirō Hatoyama 鳩山 一郎; Hatoyama Ichirō (1883–1959); Rep for Tokyo 1st	10 December 1954	19 March 1955	744	JDP; Nihon Minshutō	52. Hatoyama I. I JDP	—	—	
35		Ichirō Hatoyama 鳩山 一郎; Hatoyama Ichirō (1883–1959); Rep for Tokyo 1st	19 March 1955	22 November 1955	744	JDP; Nihon Minshutō	53. Hatoyama I. II; JDP	1955	—	
		Ichirō Hatoyama 鳩山 一郎; Hatoyama Ichirō (1883–1959); Rep for Tokyo 1st	22 November 1955	23 December 1956	744	LDP; Jimintō	54. Hatoyama I. III; LDP	—	—	
		Ichirō Hatoyama 鳩山 一郎; Hatoyama Ichirō (1883–1959); Rep for Tokyo 1st	Rebuilt diplomatic ties with the Soviet Union. Favored parole for some of the Class A war criminals who had been sentenced to life imprisonment at the Tokyo Trial.							
36		Tanzan Ishibashi 石橋 湛山; Ishibashi Tanzan (1884–1973); Rep for Shizuoka 2nd	23 December 1956	25 February 1957	64	LDP; Jimintō	55. Ishibashi; LDP	—	1956	
36		Tanzan Ishibashi 石橋 湛山; Ishibashi Tanzan (1884–1973); Rep for Shizuoka 2nd	Incapacitated due to minor stroke on 31 January 1957. Foreign Minister Kishi Nobusuke served as Deputy Prime Minister until 25 February 1957.							
37		Nobusuke Kishi 岸 信介; Kishi Nobusuke (1896–1987); Rep for Yamaguchi 1st	25 February 1957	12 June 1958	1240	LDP; Jimintō	56. Kishi I; (Reshuffle); LDP	—	—	
37		Nobusuke Kishi 岸 信介; Kishi Nobusuke (1896–1987); Rep for Yamaguchi 1st	12 June 1958	19 July 1960	1240	LDP; Jimintō	57. Kishi II; (Reshuffle); LDP	1958	1959	
38		Hayato Ikeda 池田 勇人; Ikeda Hayato (1899–1965); Rep for Hiroshima 2nd	19 July 1960	8 December 1960	1574	LDP; Jimintō	58. Ikeda I LDP	—	—	
38		Hayato Ikeda 池田 勇人; Ikeda Hayato (1899–1965); Rep for Hiroshima 2nd	8 December 1960	9 December 1963	1574	LDP; Jimintō	59. Ikeda II; (Reshuffle 1 · 2 · 3); LDP	1960	1962	
38		Hayato Ikeda 池田 勇人; Ikeda Hayato (1899–1965); Rep for Hiroshima 2nd	9 December 1963	9 November 1964	1574	LDP; Jimintō	60. Ikeda III; (Reshuffle); LDP	1963	—	
39		Eisaku Satō 佐藤 榮作; Satō Eisaku (1901–1975); Rep for Yamaguchi 2nd	9 November 1964	17 February 1967	2797	LDP; Jimintō	61. Satō I; (Reshuffle 1 · 2 · 3); LDP	—	1965	
39		Eisaku Satō 佐藤 榮作; Satō Eisaku (1901–1975); Rep for Yamaguchi 2nd	17 February 1967	14 January 1970	2797	LDP; Jimintō	62. Satō II; (Reshuffle 1 · 2); LDP	1967	1968	
39		Eisaku Satō 佐藤 榮作; Satō Eisaku (1901–1975); Rep for Yamaguchi 2nd	14 January 1970	7 July 1972	2797	LDP; Jimintō	63. Satō III; (Reshuffle)	1969	1971	
40		Kakuei Tanaka 田中 角榮; Tanaka Kakuei (1918–1993); Rep for Niigata 3rd	7 July 1972	22 December 1972	885	LDP; Jimintō	64. Tanaka K. I LDP	—	—	
40		Kakuei Tanaka 田中 角榮; Tanaka Kakuei (1918–1993); Rep for Niigata 3rd	22 December 1972	9 December 1974	885	LDP; Jimintō	65. Tanaka K. II; (Reshuffle 1 · 2); LDP	1972	—	
40		Kakuei Tanaka 田中 角榮; Tanaka Kakuei (1918–1993); Rep for Niigata 3rd	resigned in the midst of scandal. Later, "shadow shogun".							
41		Takeo Miki 三木 武夫; Miki Takeo (1907–1988); Rep for Tokushima at-large	9 December 1974	24 December 1976	746	LDP; Jimintō	66. Miki; (Reshuffle); LDP	—	1974	
42		Takeo Fukuda 福田 赳夫; Fukuda Takeo (1905–1995); Rep for Gunma 3rd	24 December 1976	7 December 1978	713	LDP; Jimintō	67. Fukuda T.; (Reshuffle); LDP	1976	1977	
43		Masayoshi Ōhira 大平 正芳; Ōhira Masayoshi (1910–1980); Rep for Kagawa 2nd	7 December 1978	9 November 1979	553	LDP; Jimintō	68. Ōhira I LDP	—	—	
43		Masayoshi Ōhira 大平 正芳; Ōhira Masayoshi (1910–1980); Rep for Kagawa 2nd	9 November 1979	12 June 1980	553	LDP; Jimintō	69. Ōhira II; LDP	1979	—	
43		Masayoshi Ōhira 大平 正芳; Ōhira Masayoshi (1910–1980); Rep for Kagawa 2nd	Died in office of natural causes.							
During this interval, Chief Cabinet Secretary Masayoshi Ito (伊東 正義 Itō Masayoshi) was the acting prime minister.
44		Zenkō Suzuki 鈴木 善幸; Suzuki Zenkō (1911–2004); Rep for Iwate 1st	17 July 1980	27 November 1982	863	LDP; Jimintō	70. Suzuki Z.; (Reshuffle); LDP	1980	1980	
45		Yasuhiro Nakasone 中曽根 康弘; Nakasone Yasuhiro (1918–2019); Rep for Gunma 3rd	27 November 1982	27 December 1983	1805	LDP; Jimintō	71. Nakasone I LDP	—	—	
45		Yasuhiro Nakasone 中曽根 康弘; Nakasone Yasuhiro (1918–2019); Rep for Gunma 3rd	27 December 1983	22 July 1986	1805	LDP; Jimintō	72. Nakasone II; (Reshuffle 1 · 2); LDP–NLC	1983	1983	
45		Yasuhiro Nakasone 中曽根 康弘; Nakasone Yasuhiro (1918–2019); Rep for Gunma 3rd	22 July 1986	6 November 1987	1805	LDP; Jimintō	73. Nakasone III; LDP	1986	1986	
46		Noboru Takeshita 竹下 登 Takeshita Noboru (1924–2000); Rep for Shimane at-large	6 November 1987	3 June 1989	575	LDP; Jimintō	74. Takeshita; (Reshuffle); LDP	—	—	
46		Noboru Takeshita 竹下 登 Takeshita Noboru (1924–2000); Rep for Shimane at-large	The Recruit scandal forced his resignation in 1989. Later "Shadow Shogun."							

=== Heisei period (1989–2019) ===
Prime Ministers of Emperor Akihito

No.	Prime Minister		Term of office			Political Party	Government	Elected		Ref
No.	Portrait	Name (Birth–Death)	Took office	Left office	Days	Political Party	Government	Gen.	Coun.	Ref
47		Sōsuke Uno 宇野 宗佑; Uno Sōsuke (1922–1998); Rep for Shiga at-large	3 June 1989	10 August 1989	68	LDP; Jimintō	75. Uno; LDP	—	1989	
47		Sōsuke Uno 宇野 宗佑; Uno Sōsuke (1922–1998); Rep for Shiga at-large	Soon after he was elected Prime Minister, allegations arose that he had an extramarital relationship with a geisha, which damaged his reputation and his party's bad performance in the 1989 House of Councillors election, for which he resigned. Served as Minister of Defense (1974), Chief of the Science and Technology Agency (1976–1977), Chief of the Civil Administration Agency (1979–1980), Minister of Economy, Trade and Industry (1983), and Minister for Foreign Affairs (1987–1989). Member of the Diet from 1960 to 1996.							
48		Toshiki Kaifu 海部 俊樹; Kaifu Toshiki (1931–); Rep for Aichi 3rd	10 August 1989	28 February 1990	817	LDP; Jimintō	76. Kaifu I LDP	—	—	
48		Toshiki Kaifu 海部 俊樹; Kaifu Toshiki (1931–); Rep for Aichi 3rd	28 February 1990	5 November 1991	817	LDP; Jimintō	77. Kaifu II; (Reshuffle); LDP	1990	—	
48		Toshiki Kaifu 海部 俊樹; Kaifu Toshiki (1931–); Rep for Aichi 3rd	Defeated in 2009, he was the longest-serving member of the lower house of the Diet, and he was also the first former prime minister to be defeated at a re-election since 1963. Served as Deputy Chief Cabinet Secretary (1974–1976), Minister of Education (1976–1977, 1985–1986). Member of the Diet from 1960 to 2009.							
49		Kiichi Miyazawa 宮澤 喜一; Miyazawa Kiichi (1919–2007); Rep for Hiroshima 3rd	5 November 1991	9 August 1993	643	LDP; Jimintō	78. Miyazawa; (Reshuffle); LDP	—	1992	
49		Kiichi Miyazawa 宮澤 喜一; Miyazawa Kiichi (1919–2007); Rep for Hiroshima 3rd	Originally a bureaucrat in the Treasury Ministry, he accompanied Prime Minister Shigeru Yoshida at the Treaty of San Francisco. A firm critic of the revision of the constitution, he advocated peace throughout his political career. After his party's stunning defeat in the 1993 general election, he was forced to resign the prime ministership, but became minister of finance in the cabinet of Keizo Obuchi and Yoshiro Mori from 1998 to 2001. He died in 2007. Served as Minister of Economy, Trade and Industry (1962–1964, 1966–1968, 1970–1971, 1977–1978), Chief Cabinet Secretary (1980–1982), Minister of Finance (1986–1988), Minister of Posts and Telecommunications (1993) and Minister of Agriculture, Forestry and Fisheries (1993). Member of the House of Councillors (1952–1965). Member of the House of Representatives (1967–2003).							
50		Morihiro Hosokawa 細川 護熙; Hosokawa Morihiro (1938–); Rep for Kumamoto 1st	9 August 1993	28 April 1994	262	JNP; Nihon Shintō	79. Hosokawa; JNP–JSP–JRP–Komeitō–NPS–DSP–SDF	1993	—	
50		Morihiro Hosokawa 細川 護熙; Hosokawa Morihiro (1938–); Rep for Kumamoto 1st	He is a member of a noble family that ruled Kumamoto since Medieval times, and during Imperial Japan, his family was part of the aristocracy, his grandfather Konoe Fumimaro having served as Prime Minister (1937–1939, 1940–1941). Originally member of the Liberal Democratic Party, he left the party in 1992 to form the Japan New Party, which garnered 35 members in the 1993 general election. He served as Prime Minister in 8-party coalition government and spearheaded a reform to change the electoral system. He resigned after allegations arose that he had misused personal funds in the 1980s. Served as Governor of Kumamoto Prefecture (1983–1991). Member of the House of Councilors from 1971 to 1983 and 1992 to 1993. Member of the House of Representatives from 1993 to 1998.							
51		Tsutomu Hata 羽田 孜 Hata Tsutomu (1935–2017); Rep for Nagano 2nd	28 April 1994	30 June 1994	63	JRP; Shinseitō	80. Hata; JRP–JNP–JSP–SDP–SDF–Komeitō–NPS	—	—	
51		Tsutomu Hata 羽田 孜 Hata Tsutomu (1935–2017); Rep for Nagano 2nd	Originally member of the Liberal Democratic Party, he left the party in 1993 with Ichirō Ozawa to establish the Japan Renewal Party, which garnered 44 seats in the 1993 general election. He served as minister for foreign affairs in the cabinet of Morihiro Hosokawa, until the latter resigned after his implication in a banking scandal. Hata then assumed the prime ministership, but since the Socialist Party had left the coalition, his minority government was forced to resign in two months as a non-confidence motion against his cabinet was submitted to the House of Representatives. Currently a member of the Democratic Party of Japan, he is now one of the elder politicians of the party. Served as minister of agriculture, forestry and fisheries (1985–1986, 1988–1989), minister of finance (1991–1992), and minister for foreign affairs. Member of the Diet from 1969 to 2012.							
52		Tomiichi Murayama 村山 富市; Murayama Tomiichi (1924–); Rep for Ōita 1st	30 June 1994	11 January 1996	560	JSP; Nihon Shakaitō	81. Murayama; (Reshuffle); JSP–LDP–NPS	—	1995	
52		Tomiichi Murayama 村山 富市; Murayama Tomiichi (1924–); Rep for Ōita 1st	Presided over a coalition that consisted of the Liberal Democratic Party, the Socialist Party, and the New Party Sakigake. During his tenure, the Great Hanshin earthquake erupted and a Sarin gas attack on the Tokyo subway occurred that left 13 dead. He resigned after his party suffered defeat in the 1996 general election. Served as General Secretary of the Socialist Party. Member of the Diet from 1972 to 2000.							
53		Ryūtarō Hashimoto 橋本 龍太郎; Hashimoto Ryūtarō (1937–2006); Rep for Okayama 4th	11 January 1996	7 November 1996	931	LDP; Jimintō	82. Hashimoto I LDP–JSP–NPS	—	—	
53		Ryūtarō Hashimoto 橋本 龍太郎; Hashimoto Ryūtarō (1937–2006); Rep for Okayama 4th	7 November 1996	30 July 1998	931	LDP; Jimintō	83. Hashimoto II; (Reshuffle); LDP–NPS	1996	1998	
53		Ryūtarō Hashimoto 橋本 龍太郎; Hashimoto Ryūtarō (1937–2006); Rep for Okayama 4th	He spearheaded widespread reforms during his tenure, including reforms to restructure the health, finance, and the bureaucratic system. He resigned after his party suffered massive defeat in the 1998 House of Councilors Election. He died in 2006. Served as Minister of Health (1978–1979), Minister of Transportation (1986–1987), Minister of Finance (1989–1991), Minister of Economy, Trade and Industry (1994–1996). Member of the Diet from 1963 to 2005.							
54		Keizō Obuchi 小渕 恵三; Obuchi Keizō (1937–2000); Rep for Gunma 5th	30 July 1998	5 April 2000	615	LDP; Jimintō	84. Obuchi; (Reshuffle 1 · 2); LDP–(Lib.–Komeitō)	—	—	
54		Keizō Obuchi 小渕 恵三; Obuchi Keizō (1937–2000); Rep for Gunma 5th	His government was credited with stimulating the economy after a depression caused by the bubble crash. After suffering from a stroke, he fell into a coma on 3 April, and died on 14 May 2000. Chief Cabinet Secretary Aoki Mikio served as Deputy Prime Minister until 5 April. Served as Chief of the Okinawa Development Agency (1979–1980), Minister of the Prime Minister's Office (1979–1980), Chief Cabinet Secretary (1987–1989), and Minister for Foreign Affairs (1997–1998). Member of the Diet from 1963 to 2000.							
55		Yoshirō Mori 森 喜朗; Mori Yoshirō (1937–); Rep for Ishikawa 2nd	5 April 2000	4 July 2000	386	LDP; Jimintō	85. Mori I LDP–Komeitō–NCP	—	—	
55		Yoshirō Mori 森 喜朗; Mori Yoshirō (1937–); Rep for Ishikawa 2nd	4 July 2000	26 April 2001	386	LDP; Jimintō	86. Mori II; (Reshuffle 1 · 2); LDP–Komeitō–NCP	2000	—	
55		Yoshirō Mori 森 喜朗; Mori Yoshirō (1937–); Rep for Ishikawa 2nd	His appointment was decided after a secret meeting by major power brokers within the Liberal Democratic Party after the unexpected death of Prime Minister Keizo Obuchi. His gaffes and his government's low legitimacy was detrimental to his government's approval ratings, for which he resigned in 2001. Served as Minister of Education (1983–1984), Minister of Economy, Trade and Industry (1992–1993), Minister of Construction (1995–1996). Member of the Diet from 1969 to 2012.							
56		Junichirō Koizumi 小泉 純一郎; Koizumi Jun'ichirō (1942–); Rep for Kanagawa 11th	26 April 2001	19 November 2003	1979	LDP; Jimintō	87. Koizumi I; (Reshuffle 1 · 2); LDP–Komeitō–NCP	—	2001	
56		Junichirō Koizumi 小泉 純一郎; Koizumi Jun'ichirō (1942–); Rep for Kanagawa 11th	19 November 2003	21 September 2005	1979	LDP; Jimintō	88. Koizumi II; (Reshuffle); LDP–Komeitō	2003	2004	
56		Junichirō Koizumi 小泉 純一郎; Koizumi Jun'ichirō (1942–); Rep for Kanagawa 11th	21 September 2005	26 September 2006	1979	LDP; Jimintō	89. Koizumi III; (Reshuffle); LDP–Komeitō	2005	—	
56		Junichirō Koizumi 小泉 純一郎; Koizumi Jun'ichirō (1942–); Rep for Kanagawa 11th	Resigned due to term limits of the Presidency of the Liberal Democratic Party. Served as Vice Minister of Finance (1979), Minister of Health and Welfare (1988–1989), Minister of Posts and Telecommunications (1992), Minister of Health and Welfare (1996–1998), and Minister of Foreign Affairs (2002). Member of Diet from 1972 to 2009.							
57		Shinzō Abe 安倍 晋三; Abe Shinzō (1954–2022); Rep for Yamaguchi 4th	26 September 2006	26 September 2007	365	LDP; Jimintō	90. Abe S. I; (Reshuffle); LDP–Komeitō	—	2007	
57		Shinzō Abe 安倍 晋三; Abe Shinzō (1954–2022); Rep for Yamaguchi 4th	Resigned after suffering from low approval ratings and poor health. Served as Chief Cabinet Secretary (2005–2006). Member of Diet since 1993.							
58		Yasuo Fukuda 福田 康夫; Fukuda Yasuo (1936–); Rep for Gunma 4th	26 September 2007	24 September 2008	364	LDP; Jimintō	91. Fukuda Y.; (Reshuffle); LDP–Komeitō	—	—	
58		Yasuo Fukuda 福田 康夫; Fukuda Yasuo (1936–); Rep for Gunma 4th	Resigned after asserting the need to improve the flow of the political process. Served as Minister for Okinawa Development (2000), Chief Cabinet Secretary (2000–2004), and Minister of State for Gender Equality and Social Affairs (2001–2004). Member of Diet from 1990 to 2012.							
59		Tarō Asō 麻生 太郎; Asō Tarō (1940–); Rep for Fukuoka 8th	24 September 2008	16 September 2009	357	LDP; Jimintō	92. Asō; LDP–Komeitō	—	—	
59		Tarō Asō 麻生 太郎; Asō Tarō (1940–); Rep for Fukuoka 8th	Resigned after the 2009 general election to accept the responsibility for the worst defeat of the history of the Liberal Democratic Party. Served as Director of Economic Planning Agency (1996–1997), Minister in charge of Economic and Financial Policies (2001), Minister of Internal Affairs and Communications (2003–2005), Minister of Foreign Affairs (2005–2007), and Deputy Prime Minister and Minister of Finance (since 2012). Member of Diet since 1979.							
60		Yukio Hatoyama 鳩山 由紀夫; Hatoyama Yukio (1947–); Rep for Hokkaido 9th	16 September 2009	8 June 2010	265	DPJ; Minshutō	93. Hatoyama Y.; DPJ–SDP–PNP	2009	—	
60		Yukio Hatoyama 鳩山 由紀夫; Hatoyama Yukio (1947–); Rep for Hokkaido 9th	Won a majority in the 2009 general election defeating Tarō Asō (LDP). Resigned after breaking a campaign promise to close Marine Corps Air Station Futenma in Okinawa Prefecture. Member of Diet from 1986 to 2012.							
61		Naoto Kan 菅 直人; Kan Naoto (1946–); Rep for Tokyo 18th	8 June 2010	2 September 2011	451	DPJ; Minshutō	94. Kan; (Reshuffle 1 · 2); DPJ–PNP	—	2010	
61		Naoto Kan 菅 直人; Kan Naoto (1946–); Rep for Tokyo 18th	Resigned due to poor approval ratings after the 2011 Tōhoku earthquake and tsunami and Fukushima Daiichi nuclear disaster. Served as Minister of Health and Welfare (1996), Deputy Prime Minister of Japan (2009–2010), Minister of State for Economic and Fiscal Policy (2009–2010), Minister of State in charge of National Strategy (2009–2010), Minister of State for Science and Technology Policy (2009–2010), and Minister of Finance (2010). Member of Diet since 1980.							
62		Yoshihiko Noda 野田 佳彦; Noda Yoshihiko (1957–); Rep for Chiba 4th	2 September 2011	26 December 2012	481	DPJ; Minshutō	95. Noda; (Reshuffle 1 · 2 · 3); DPJ–PNP	—	—	
62		Yoshihiko Noda 野田 佳彦; Noda Yoshihiko (1957–); Rep for Chiba 4th	Resigned after the 2012 general election to accept the responsibility for the defeat of the Democratic Party. Served as Senior Vice Minister of Finance (2009–2010) and Minister of Finance (2010–2011). Member of Diet since 1993.							
(57)		Shinzō Abe 安倍 晋三; Abe Shinzō (1954–2022); Rep for Yamaguchi 4th	26 December 2012	24 December 2014	2821	LDP; Jimintō	96. Abe S. II; (Reshuffle); LDP–Komeitō	2012	2013	
(57)		Shinzō Abe 安倍 晋三; Abe Shinzō (1954–2022); Rep for Yamaguchi 4th	24 December 2014	1 November 2017	2821	LDP; Jimintō	97. Abe S. III; (Reshuffle 1 · 2 · 3); LDP–Komeitō	2014	2016	
(57)		Shinzō Abe 安倍 晋三; Abe Shinzō (1954–2022); Rep for Yamaguchi 4th	1 November 2017	16 September 2020	2821	LDP; Jimintō	98. Abe S. IV; (Reshuffle 1 · 2); LDP–Komeitō	2017	2019	
(57)		Shinzō Abe 安倍 晋三; Abe Shinzō (1954–2022); Rep for Yamaguchi 4th	The first prime minister to serve non-consecutive terms since the end of the US occupation. Won a majority in the 2012 general election defeating Yoshihiko Noda (DPJ). Won the 2014 and 2017 general elections retaining a majority in the House of Representatives. Served as the 90th term Prime Minister (2006–2007), Chief Cabinet Secretary (2005–2006). Member of Diet from 1993 until his death in 2022. Resigned as Prime Minister in 2020							

=== Reiwa period (2019–present) ===
Prime Ministers of Emperor Naruhito

No.	Prime Minister		Term of office			Political Party	Government	Elected		Ref
No.	Portrait	Name (Birth–Death)	Took office	Left office	Days	Political Party	Government	Gen.	Coun.	Ref
63		Yoshihide Suga 菅 義偉; Suga Yoshihide (1948–); Rep for Kanagawa 2nd	16 September 2020	4 October 2021	383	LDP; Jimintō	99. Suga; LDP–Komeitō	—	—	
63		Yoshihide Suga 菅 義偉; Suga Yoshihide (1948–); Rep for Kanagawa 2nd	He became Prime Minister of Japan after his selection as Leader of the LDP. He served before as the Chief Cabinet Secretary (2012–2020). Member of Diet since 1996. Resigned as Prime Minister in 2021							
64		Fumio Kishida 岸田 文雄; Kishida Fumio (1957–); Rep for Hiroshima 1st	4 October 2021	10 November 2021	1814	LDP; Jimintō	100. Kishida I LDP–Komeitō	—	—	
64		Fumio Kishida 岸田 文雄; Kishida Fumio (1957–); Rep for Hiroshima 1st	10 November 2021	Incumbent	1814	LDP; Jimintō	101. Kishida II; (Reshuffle); LDP–Komeitō	2021	2022	
64		Fumio Kishida 岸田 文雄; Kishida Fumio (1957–); Rep for Hiroshima 1st	Kishida is the current prime minister of Japan. Won a majority in the 2021 general election defeating Yukio Edano (CDP). He served before as the Minister for Foreign Affairs (2012–2017). Member of Diet since 1996.							

== Religious leaders ==
- Dogen
- Eisai
- Kūkai
- Miki Nakayama
- Nichiren
- Nikkō
- Ryōkan
- Saigyo
- Shinran
- Asahara Shōko
- Taisen Deshimaru
- Peter Doi
- Nichidatsu Fujii
- Joseph Satoshi Fukahori
- Keido Fukushima
- Stephen Fumio Hamao
- Januarius Kyunosuke Hayasaka
- Peter Takaaki Hirayama
- Daisaku Ikeda
- Peter Baptist Tadamaro Ishigami
- Kōshū Itabashi
- Terasawa Junsei
- Petro Kasui Kibe
- Peter Magoshiro Matsuoka
- Sōyū Matsuoka
- Paulo Miki
- Joseph Atsumi Misue
- Francis Xavier Osamu Mizobe
- Magdalene of Nagasaki
- Teshima Ikurō
- Uchimura Kanzo
- Yoshihiko Kikuchi
- Peter Takeo Okada
- Marina of Omura
- Joseph Asajiro Satowaki
- Kōdō Sawaki
- Nyogen Senzaki
- Francis Xavier Kaname Shimamoto
- Peter Shirayanagi
- Takuan Sōhō
- Shunryū Suzuki
- Daisetz Teitaro Suzuki
- Paul Yoshigoro Taguchi
- Joseph Mitsuaki Takami
- Jacobo Kyushei Tomonaga
- Mitsumyo Tottori
- Paul Tsuchihashi
- Thomas Tsugi
- Kōshō Uchiyama
- Taitetsu Unno
- Paul Hisao Yasuda

== Scientists ==
- Esaki Leo
- Honda Kōtarō
- Ikeda Kikunae
- Kitasato Shibasaburō
- Shinji Kawasaki
- Mikimoto Kōkichi
- Yamada Kōrin
- Mishima Tokuhichi
- Nakaya Ukichirō
- Niwa Yasujirō
- Sugawara Hirotaka
- Sugimoto Kyōta
- Tago Akihiko
- Takamine Jōkichi
- Tanaka Kōichi
- Tonegawa Susumu
- Fujita Tetsuya
- Tomonaga Shin'ichirō
- Toyoda Sakichi
- Yagi Hidetsugu
- Yukawa Hideki
- Norio Kaifu

== Mathematicians ==
- Heisuke Hironaka
- Kenkichi Iwasawa
- Masaki Kashiwara
- Takahiro Kawai
- Kunihiko Kodaira
- Shigefumi Mori
- Mikio Sato
- Seki Kōwa
- Goro Shimura
- Teiji Takagi
- Yutaka Taniyama
- Nobuo Yoneda

== Economists ==
- Takeshi Amemiya
- Masahiko Aoki
- Masahisa Fujita
- Fumio Hayashi
- Charles Horioka
- Nobuhiro Kiyotaki
- Michio Morishima
- Morito Tatsuo
- Ōuchi Hyōei
- Osamu Shimomura
- Yasuma Takada
- Heizō Takenaka
- Takano Iwasaburo
- Shigeto Tsuru
- Yoshihiro Tsurumi
- Yukihiro Torikai
- Kazuhide Uekusa
- Hirofumi Uzawa

== Other notables ==
- Tomohiro Hase
- Aneha Hidetsugu
- Hatta Yoichi
- Horie Kenichi
- Kawakami Kiyoshi
- Jonathan Kestenbaum, Baron Kestenbaum
- Takeru Kobayashi
- Shinji Matsuo
- Sakae Menda
- Masao Miyamoto
- Shigeru Miyamoto
- Nitobe Inazō
- Sakae Ōba
- Konosuke Matsushita
- Onoda Hirō
- Nui Onoue
- Sakae Ōsugi
- Airi Ōtsu, organic farmer
- Sakai Toshihiko
- Lady Saigō
- Sakamura Ken
- San'yūtei Enchō
- Sugihara Chiune
- Satoshi Tajiri
- Hisao Taoka, engineer
- Sonoda Tenkoko
- Hiro Matsushita
- Terada Torahiko
- Uchimura Kanzō
- Gunpei Yokoi
- Yasutaro Koide
- Yoshikawa Takeo
- Yuasa Takashi
- Hitomi Watanabe
- Masumi Watanabe
- Hirofumi Yamashita
- Naoki Urasawa
- Masashi Usami, engineer

== Other Japanese ==
- Reika Hashimoto
- Anna Tsuchiya
- Anna Umemiya
- Linda Yamamoto
- Beni Arashiro
- Tadanobu Asano
- Meisa Kuroki
- Angela Aki
- Chieko Kawabe
- Megumi Nakajima
- Emi Watanabe
- Keisuke Ogihara
- Masayoshi "Mabo" Kabe
- Minami Hinase
- Sowelu
- Marcus Tulio Tanaka
- LISA
- Koji Murofushi
- Hidenori Kusaka
- Yuka Murofushi
- Masumi Okada
- Takeshi Kaneshiro
- Yuu Shirota
- Koji Ota
- Hiromi Hayakawa
- Joji (musician)
- Tomiko Itooka

== See also ==
- List of people by nationality
