= Mori Cabinet =

Mori Cabinet may refer to:

- First Mori Cabinet, the Japanese majority government led by Yoshirō Mori in 2000
- Second Mori Cabinet, the Japanese majority government led by Yoshirō Mori from 2000 to 2001
