= Hisao =

- Gender: Male

Origin
- Origin: Japanese
- Meaning: Different meanings depending on the kanji used

Hisao (written: 央生, 久生, 久雄, 寿雄, 寿夫, 尚雄, 尚久 or 尚勇) is a masculine Japanese given name. Notable people with the name include:

- Hisao Egawa (江川 央生; born 1962), Japanese voice actor
- Hisao Hayashi (林 寿夫; 1881–1963), Japanese government official
- Hisao Heiuchi (塀内 久雄; born 1981), Japanese baseball player
- Hisao Kami (上 久雄; born 1941), Japanese footballer and manager
- Hisao Kuramata (倉又 寿雄; born 1958), Japanese footballer and manager
- Hisao Migo (御江 久夫; 1900–1985), Japanese botanist
- Hisao Morita (盛田 久生; born 1939), Japanese pole vaulter
- Hisao Oguchi (小口 久雄, born 1960), Japanese businessman
- Hisao Sekiguchi (関口 久雄; born 1954), Japanese footballer
- Hisao Shinagawa (born 1946), Japanese singer-songwriter
- Hisao Tanabe (田辺 尚雄; 1883–1984), Japanese musicologist
- Hisao Taoka, Japanese engineer
- Hisao Tanaka (1921–1991), American professional wrestler
- Hisao Tani (谷 寿夫; 1882–1947), Japanese general
- Hisao Yamada (山田 尚勇; 1930–2008), Japanese computer scientist
- Hisao Yanagisawa (柳沢 尚久; born 1957), Japanese sprint canoeist
