= Usami =

Usami (written: 宇佐美 or 宇佐見) is a Japanese surname. Notable people with the surname include:

- Akio Usami (宇佐美 彰朗; born 1943), Japanese long-distance runner
- Daisuke Usami (宇佐美 大輔; born 1979), Japanese volleyball player
- Fumio Usami (宇佐美 文雄; born 1968), Japanese mixed martial artist
- Hirokazu Usami (宇佐美 宏和; born 1987), Japanese footballer
- Kazuhiko Usami (宇佐美 和彦; born 1992), Japanese rugby union player
- Makoto Usami (宇佐美 洵; 1901–1983), Japanese banker and businessman
- Masashi Usami (宇佐見 正士) Japanese engineer
- Meison Hide Usami (宇佐美 秀 メイソン; born 2001) Japanese kickboxer and mixed martial artist
- Usami Sadamitsu (宇佐美 定満; 1489–1564), Japanese samurai
- Tadanori Usami (宇佐美 忠則), Japanese AV director
- Takashi Usami (宇佐美 貴史; born 1992), Japanese footballer
- Toshio Usami (宇佐美 敏夫; 1908–1991), Japanese field hockey player
- Yoshihiro Usami (宇佐美 吉啓; born 1977), Japanese dancer

== Fictional characters ==
- Ichika Usami (宇佐美いちか), a.k.a. Cure Whip, protagonist of the 2017 anime Kirakira Pretty Cure a la Mode
- Sumireko Usami, character from Urban Legend in Limbo in the Touhou Project series
- Tokishige Usami (Golden Kamuy)
- Usami (Danganronpa 2: Goodbye Despair )

== See also ==
- Usami Station, a railway station in Itō, Shizuoka Prefecture, Japan
