= Torikai =

Torikai (written: 鳥養, 鳥飼 or 鳥海) is a Japanese surname. Notable people with the surname include:

- Junko Torikai (鳥飼 淳子, born 1975), Japanese swimmer
- Ushio Torikai (鳥養 潮, born 1952), Japanese composer
- Yoshiki Torikai (鳥海 芳樹, born 1998), Japanese footballer
- Yukihiro Torikai (鳥飼 行博, born 1959), Japanese economist
- Yuya Torikai (鳥養 祐矢, born 1988), Japanese footballer
