= Toshitsugu =

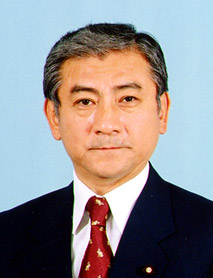
- Toshitsugu Saito, Japanese politician
- Pronunciation: toɕitsɯgɯ (IPA)
- Gender: Male

Origin
- Origin: Japanese
- Meaning: Different meanings depending on the kanji used

Other names
- Alternative spelling: Tositugu (Kunrei-shiki) Tositugu (Nihon-shiki) Toshitsugu (Hepburn)

Toshitsugu is a masculine Japanese given name.

== Written forms ==
Toshitsugu can be written using different combinations of kanji characters. Here are some examples:

- 敏次, "agile, next"
- 敏継, "agile, continue"
- 敏嗣, "agile, succession"
- 俊次, "talented, next"
- 俊継, "talented, continue"
- 俊嗣, "talented, succession"
- 利次, "benefit, next"
- 利継, "benefit, continue"
- 利嗣, "benefit, succession"
- 寿次, "long life, next"
- 寿継, "long life, continue"
- 寿嗣, "long life, succession"
- 年次, "year, next"
- 年継, "year, continue"
- 年嗣, "year, succession"
- 斗志二, "Big Dipper, intention, two"

The name can also be written in hiragana としつぐ or katakana トシツグ.

== Notable people with the name ==
- Toshitsugu Maeda (前田 利次, 1617–1674), Japanese daimyō.
- Toshitsugu Saito (斉藤 斗志二, born 1944), Japanese politician.
