= Shizuoka 5th district =

Legislative district of Japan

Shizuoka 5th District
- Parliamentary constituency for the Japanese House of Representatives
- Numbered map of Shizuoka Prefecture single-member districts
- Prefecture: Shizuoka
- Proportional District: Tōkai
- Electorate: 445,231

Current constituency
- Created: 1994
- Seats: One
- Party: LDP
- Representative: Goshi Hosono
- Municipalities: Mishima, Fuji (excluding Fujikawa), Gotenba, Susono, Tagata District and Oyama in Suntō District

Shizuoka 5th district (静岡県第5区, Shizuoka-ken dai-goku or simply 静岡5区, Shizuoka-goku) is a single-member constituency of the House of Representatives in the national Diet of Japan located in Shizuoka Prefecture.

== List of representatives ==
Election	Representative	Party	Dates	Notes
1996	Toshitsugu Saito	LDP	1996 – 2003	
2000	Toshitsugu Saito	LDP	1996 – 2003	
2003	Goshi Hosono	DPJ	2003 – 2016	Incumbent
2005	Goshi Hosono	DPJ	2003 – 2016	Incumbent
2009	Goshi Hosono	DPJ	2003 – 2016	Incumbent
2012	Goshi Hosono	DPJ	2003 – 2016	Incumbent
2014	Goshi Hosono	DPJ	2003 – 2016	Incumbent
2014	Goshi Hosono	DP	2016 – 2017	Incumbent
2014	Goshi Hosono	Kibō	2017 - 2018	Incumbent
2017	Goshi Hosono	Kibō	2017 - 2018	Incumbent
2017	Goshi Hosono	Independent	2018 – 2021	Incumbent
2021	Goshi Hosono	Independent	2018 – 2021	Incumbent
2021	Goshi Hosono	LDP	2021–present	Incumbent
2024	Goshi Hosono	LDP	2021–present	Incumbent
2026	Goshi Hosono	LDP	2021–present	Incumbent

== Election results ==
2026
Party	Candidate	Votes	%	±%
LDP	Goshi Hosono	168,511	74.8	▲11.6
Centrist Reform	Masayoshi Nakamura	43,417	19.3	▼10.5
JCP	Kazumi Shimoyama	13,367	5.9	▼1.1
Registered electors		433,148		
Turnout			54.09	▲1.11
LDP hold				

2024
Party	Candidate	Votes	%	±%
LDP	Goshi Hosono	141,021	63.2	▲38.3
CDP	Kazuyuki Toyama	66,612	29.8	▲8.7
JCP	Kazumi Shimoyama	15,605	7.0	
Registered electors		436,905		
Turnout			52.98	▼1.41
LDP hold				

2021
Party	Candidate	Votes	%	±%
Indep.	Goshi Hosono (Incumbent)	127,580	51.81	New
LDP	Takeru Yoshikawa (Incumbent-Tōkai PR) (reelected by PR)	61,337	24.91	▼11.97
CDP	Norikazu Ono	51,965	21.10	New
Indep.	Hikaru Chida	5,350	2.17	New
Registered electors		458,636		
Turnout			54.39	▼0.83

2017
Party	Candidate	Votes	%	±%
Kibō	Goshi Hosono (Incumbent)	137,523	54.85	New
LDP	Takeru Yoshikawa (Incumbent-Tōkai PR) (reelected by PR)	92,467	36.88	▲2.25
JCP	Masahiko Iguchi	20,750	8.28	▲1.47
Registered electors		464,130		
Turnout			55.22	▲0.52

2014
Party	Candidate	Votes	%	±%
DPJ	Goshi Hosono (Incumbent)	143,012	58.56	▼0.42
LDP	Takeru Yoshikawa (Incumbent-PR)	84,574	34.63	▲2.75
JCP	Momoko Ohba	16,638	6.81	▲0.97
Registered electors		456,271		
Turnout			54.70	▼5.38

- Yoshikawa was elected by Tōkai-PR block additionally.

2012
Party	Candidate	Votes	%	±%
DPJ	Goshi Hosono (Incumbent)	156,887	58.98	▼0.06
LDP	Takeru Yoshikawa (elected by Tōkai PR)	84,800	31.88	▼7.14
JCP	Momoko Ohba	15,526	5.84	▲1.25
Indep.	Hisao Ishioroshi	8,802	3.31	New
Registered electors		457,412		
Turnout			60.08	▼9.54

2009
Party	Candidate	Votes	%	±%
DPJ	Goshi Hosono (Incumbent)	184,328	59.04	▲10.25
LDP	Toshitsugu Saito (Incumbent-Tōkai PR)	121,813	39.02	▼7.59
HRP	Shintaro Hori	6,069	1.94	New
Registered electors		456,360		
Turnout			69.62	▲1.08

2005
Party	Candidate	Votes	%	±%
DPJ	Goshi Hosono (Incumbent)	148,002	48.79	▼0.60
LDP	Toshitsugu Saito (Incumbent-Tōkai PR) (reelected by Tōkai PR)	141,387	46.61	▼0.18
JCP	Yūki Sakuyama	13,936	4.59	▲0.77
Registered electors		448,424		
Turnout			68.54	▲4.86

2003
Party	Candidate	Votes	%	±%
DPJ	Goshi Hosono (Incumbent-Shizuoka 7th)	137,201	49.39	▲17.62
LDP	Toshitsugu Saito (Incumbent) (elected by Tōkai PR)	129,988	46.79	▼3.06
JCP	Yasuo Sugita	10,610	3.82	▼3.77
Registered electors		443,572		
Turnout			63.68	▲0.26

2000
Party	Candidate	Votes	%	±%
LDP	Toshitsugu Saito (Incumbent)	84,743	49.85	▼2.66
DPJ	Akiko Izumi	54,010	31.77	New
SDP	Tadasu Kikuchi (Incumbent-Tōkai PR)	18,345	10.79	▼11.55
JCP	Yasuo Sugita	12,908	7.59	▼2.66
Registered electors		286,109		
Turnout			60.92	▲6.17

1996
Party	Candidate	Votes	%	±%
LDP	Toshitsugu Saito	76,492	52.51	New
SDP	Hideyuki Maejima (elected by Tōkai PR)	32,545	22.34	New
Indep.	Susumu Saito	21,710	14.90	New
JCP	Shoichi Shimōka	14,927	10.25	New
Registered electors		276,544		
Turnout			54.75	

== See also ==
- List of districts of the House of Representatives of Japan
