= Masao Miyamoto =

Japanese psychiatrist

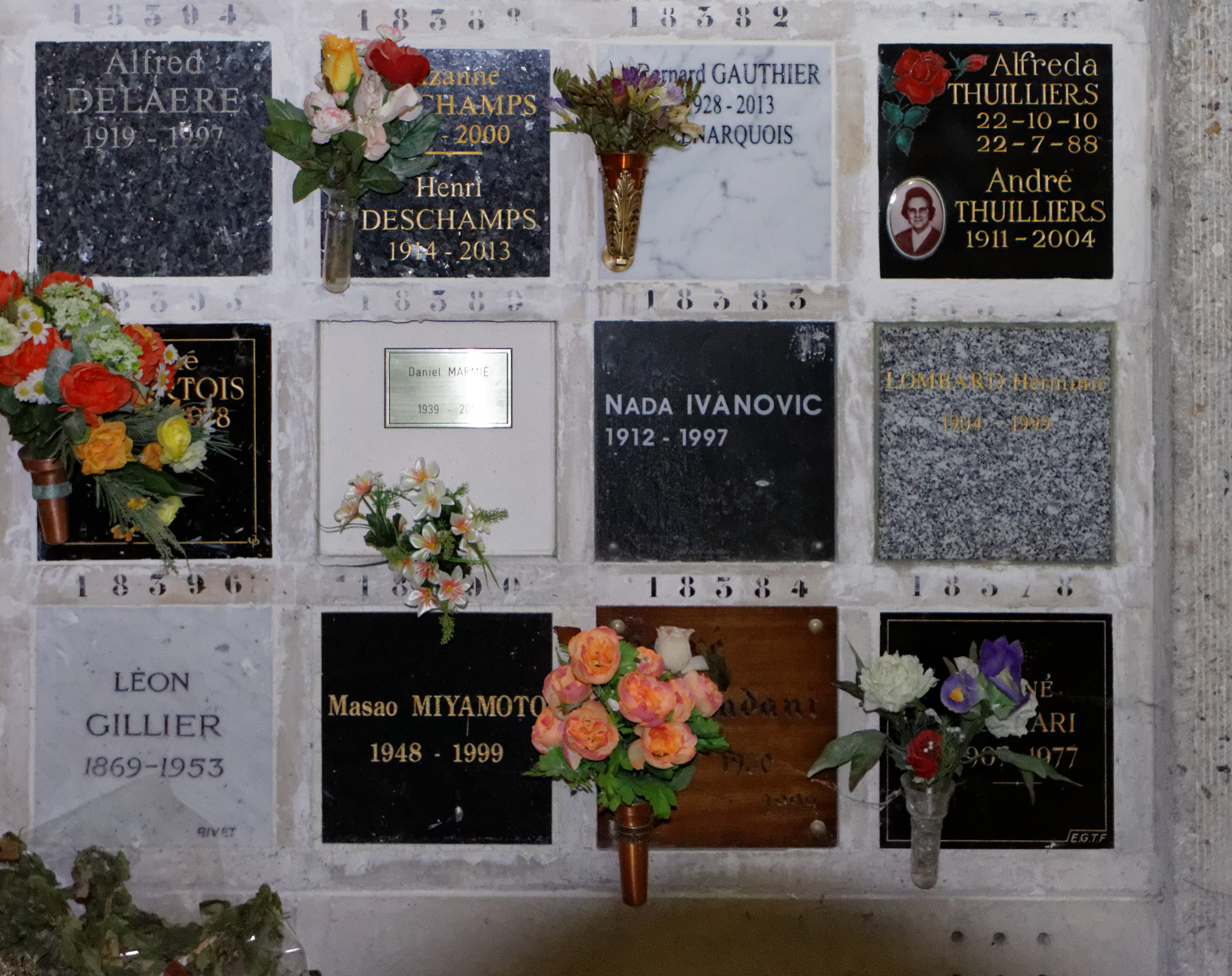
Père-Lachaise

Masao Miyamoto (宮本 政於, Miyamoto Masao; 1948 – July 18, 1999) was a Japanese psychiatrist, cultural critic, and one-time deputy director for Japan's Ministry of Health, Labour and Welfare (厚生省 Kōseishō).

Miyamoto graduated from Nihon University Medical College (日本大学医学部 Nihon Daigaku Igakubu) in Tokyo in 1973 ja:宮本政於. He subsequently spent a year in post-graduate training for pathology before moving to the United States where he spent three years studying psychiatry and psychoanalysis at Yale University. Upon completion, he took the position of assistant professor at Cornell University in 1980. In 1984, he accepted a position as assistant professor at New York Medical College. In 1986, he joined the Ministry of Health, Labour and Welfare as deputy director of the Mental Health Division.

In 1992, he began writing a series of articles critical of Japan's bureaucratic culture for the monthly magazine Gekkan Asahi. These were later published in the best-selling book Oyakusho no Okite (お役所の掟) or "Code of the Bureaucrats", which was later published in English under the title Straitjacket Society. Following the publication of his articles, he experienced a series of demotions and was finally fired by the Ministry in February 1995. After being fired, he published a second book in 1997 titled Oyakusho no Seishinbunseki (お役所の精神分析) or Psychoanalyzing the Bureaucrats . This second book has not yet been translated into English.

He spent the remainder of his life giving lectures on Japanese society and the Japanese bureaucracy. Dr. Miyamoto died in Paris from colorectal cancer on July 18, 1999.
