= Kojima Toyoharu =

16th-century samurai

Kojima Toyoharu (小島 豊春, d. 1520) was a samurai of Etchū who served the Jinbo family and may have been a cousin or nephew of Jinbo Yoshimune. Despite this, he attempted on at least one occasion to assert his independence but was convinced to submit to the Jinbo. He was killed in 1520 in battle against Nagao Tamekage. His relation (if any) to the later Kojima Motoshige, a somewhat better-known Jinbo vassal, is unknown.
