= Hisao Heiuchi =

Japanese baseball player (born 1981)

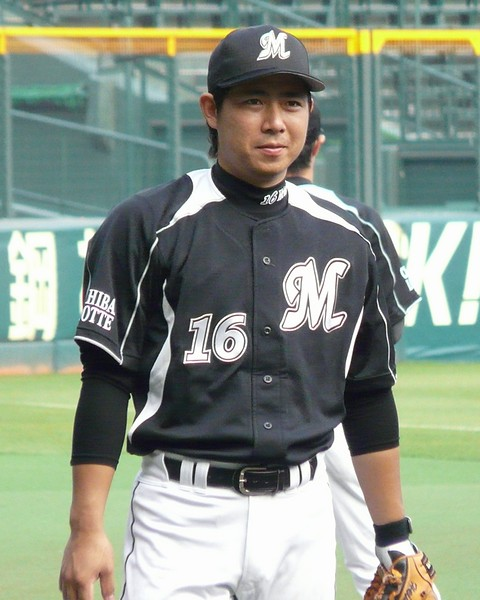
- Infielder
- Born: July 7, 1981 (age 44)
- Batted: Left Threw: Right

NPB debut
- 2002, for the Chiba Lotte Marines

Last appearance
- 2013, for the Chiba Lotte Marines

NPB statistics
- Batting average: .199
- Home runs: 9
- RBI: 40
- Stats at Baseball Reference

Teams
- Chiba Lotte Marines (2002–2013)

Hisao Heiuchi (塀内 久雄, born July 7, 1981) is a Japanese former professional baseball infielder. He played from 2002 to 2013 with the Chiba Lotte Marines in Japan's Nippon Professional Baseball.
