= Shinji Matsuo =

Japanese engineer

Shinji Matsuo (松尾 慎治, Matsuo Shinji) from the NTT Device Technology Laboratories, Kanagawa, Japan was named Fellow of the Institute of Electrical and Electronics Engineers (IEEE) in 2016 for contributions to heterogeneous integration of semiconductor lasers.
