= Thomas Tsugi =

Japanese Catholic preacher (1571–1627)

Martyrdom of Thomas Tsugi

Thomas Tsugi, SJ (1571 – 1627) was a Japanese Catholic preacher and member of the Society of Jesus. He was killed during the anti-Catholic persecutions in Japan and was beatified by Pope Pius IX in 1867.

== Biography ==
Tsugi was born in 1570 near Omura, Japan, to a wealthy family of Japanese nobility. Educated by the priests of the Society of Jesus at Arima, he joined the order in 1589. As a Jesuit, Thomas traveled Japan and became very popular as an eloquent and persuasive preacher.

Under the edict of 1614, Tsugi was arrested and exiled to Macau, where he spent four years. Desiring to continue his missionary work in his homeland, he returned to Japan in disguised as a merchant. In 1619, suffering some moments of doubt, he asked to be relieved of his vows. He later returned and was readmitted, resuming his missionary work and life of prayer.

The Japanese authorities soon caught up with him and recaptured him. They imprisoned Thomas and sentenced him to death. In 1627 Thomas Tsugi became a martyr, burned to death in Nagasaki, Japan — along with several companions. He was heard to proclaim as he died, "Praise the Lord of all nations!"

He is one of the 205 martyrs of Japan beatified by Pope Pius IX in 1867, who are remembered on the 10 September each year.

== Sources ==
- Blessed Thomas Tsugi at Patron Saints Index
