= Second Mori cabinet =

- 86th Cabinet of Japan

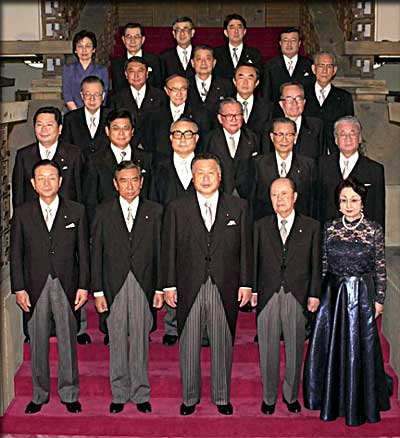
- Prime Minister Yoshirō Mori (front row, centre) with the re-elected cabinet inside the Kantei, July 4, 2000
- Date formed: July 4, 2000
- Date dissolved: December 5, 2000

People and organisations
- Head of state: Emperor Akihito
- Head of government: Yoshirō Mori
- Member party: LDP-NKP-NCP coalition
- Status in legislature: Majority coalition
- Opposition party: Democratic Party of Japan
- Opposition leader: Yukio Hatoyama

History
- Election: 2000 general election
- Predecessor: Mori I
- Successor: Mori II (Reshuffle before 2001 CGR)

The Second Mori cabinet governed Japan between July 2000 and April 2001 as a coalition government under the leadership of Prime Minister Yoshirō Mori of the Liberal Democratic Party. The cabinet was formed after the LDP-NKP-NCP coalition was returned to office with a substantially reduced majority in the June 25 general election, and inaugurated after Mori's re-election by the National Diet on July 4. Unlike his first cabinet, which retained all of former Prime Minister Keizō Obuchi's ministers, Mori introduced several personnel changes, although this was done with reference to LDP factions.

== Mori administration ==
Administrative reforms begun under Prime Minister Hashimoto came into effect during the Mori government's second term, resulting in the merger, renaming or creation of several ministries and cabinet posts. Two reshuffles of the second Mori Cabinet took place, the first in December 2000 in which a large number of ministers were replaced and ministerial portfolios were allocated in anticipation of the planned overhaul in government structures. Hashimoto was brought back into cabinet to oversee further government reforms. When the second reshuffle occurred one month later no ministers were moved, but instead the changes in ministries and offices came into effect. The powers of the Prime Minister's office were increased and the number of ministers was reduced through mergers, for example the Home Affairs, Management and Co-ordination, and Posts and Communications briefs were combined to become the Minister for Internal Affairs and Communications.

Mori was a deeply unpopular leader throughout his year-long term, with several gaffes, scandals and resignations of government and party figures causing his approval ratings to fall below 10 percent. At the end of 2000, several LDP members launched an abortive effort to remove Mori through a vote of no-confidence, this failed, though it further damaged his government's standing. In the spring of 2001, Mori announced that the election for LDP president would be brought forward from the autumn, which was in effect a resignation announcement since he was not expected to stand again for the leadership. Mori then confirmed his intention to stand down at the beginning of April and remained in office for several more weeks until Junichiro Koizumi was elected as his successor and became Prime Minister on April 26.

== Election of the prime minister ==
4 July 2000
House of Representatives Absolute majority (241/480) required
Choice	First Vote
Choice	Votes
Yoshirō Mori	284 / 480
Yukio Hatoyama	130 / 480
Ichiro Ozawa	22 / 480
Tetsuzo Fuwa	20 / 480
Takako Doi	19 / 480
Koji Kakizawa	1 / 480
Torao Tokuda	1 / 480
Motoo Shiina	1 / 480
Abstentions (Including blank ballots)	2 / 480
Source Diet Minutes - 148th Session

== List of ministers ==
Liberal Democratic
New Komeito
New Conservative
Independent
R = Member of the House of Representatives
C = Member of the House of Councillors

=== Cabinet ===
Second Mori Cabinet from July 4, 2000 to December 5, 2000
Portfolio	Minister		Term of office
Prime Minister	Yoshirō Mori	R	April 5, 2000 - April 26, 2001
Minister of Justice	Okiharu Yasuoka	R	July 4, 2000 - December 5, 2000
Minister of Foreign Affairs	Yōhei Kōno	R	October 5, 1999 - April 26, 2001
Minister of Finance	Kiichi Miyazawa	R	July 30, 1998 - April 26, 2001
Minister of Education; Director of the Science and Technology Agency	Tadamori Oshima	R	July 4, 2000 - December 5, 2000
Minister of Health and Welfare	Yūji Tsushima	R	July 4, 2000 - December 5, 2000
Minister of Agriculture, Forestry and Fisheries	Yoichi Tani	R	July 4, 2000 - December 5, 2000
Minister of International Trade and Industry	Takeo Hiranuma	R	July 4, 2000 - January 6, 2001
Minister of Transport; Director of the Hokkaido Development Agency	Hajime Morita	R	July 4, 2000 - December 5, 2000
Minister of Posts and Telecommunications	Kozo Hirabayashi	R	July 4, 2000 - December 5, 2000
Minister of Labour	Yoshio Yoshikawa	C	July 4, 2000 - December 5, 2000
Minister of Construction; Director of the National Land Agency	Chikage Ogi	C	July 4, 2000 - January 6, 2001
Minister of Home Affairs; Director of the National Public Safety Commission	Mamoru Nishida	R	July 4, 2000 - December 5, 2000
Chief Cabinet Secretary; Director of the Okinawa Development Agency	Hidenao Nakagawa	R	July 4, 2000 - October 27, 2000
Chief Cabinet Secretary; Director of the Okinawa Development Agency	Yasuo Fukuda	R	October 27, 2000 - May 7, 2004
Chairman of the Financial Reconstruction Commission	Kimitaka Kuze	C	July 4, 2000 - July 30, 2000
Chairman of the Financial Reconstruction Commission	Hideyuki Aizawa	R	July 30, 2000 - December 5, 2000
Director of the Management and Coordination Agency	Kunihiro Tsuzuki	C	October 5, 1999 - December 5, 2000
Director of the Japan Defense Agency	Kazuo Torashima	R	July 4, 2000 - December 5, 2000
Director of the Economic Planning Agency	Taichi Sakaiya	-	July 30, 1998 - December 5, 2000
Director of the Environment Agency	Yoriko Kawaguchi	-	July 4, 2000 - January 6, 2001
Deputy Secretaries
Deputy Chief Cabinet Secretary (Political Affairs - House of Representatives)	Shinzo Abe	R	July 4, 2000 - September 22, 2003
Deputy Chief Cabinet Secretary (Political Affairs - House of Councillors)	Kosei Ueno	C	July 4, 2000 - September 22, 2003
Deputy Chief Cabinet Secretary (Bureaucrat)	Teijiro Furukawa	-	February 24, 1995 - September 22, 2003

==== Changes ====
- July 30, 2000 - Chairman of the Financial Reconstruction Commission Kimitaka Kuze resigned as the result of a payments scandal and was replaced with Hideyuki Aizawa.
- October 27, 2000 - Chief Cabinet Secretary Hidenao Nakagawa resigned after being accused in the press of having connections to far-right groups, and of having an extramarital affair which led him to leak confidential information. He was replaced with Yasuo Fukuda.

=== Reshuffle before 2001 Central Government Reform ===
Second Mori Cabinet (Reshuffle before 2001 CGR)
- 86th Cabinet of Japan

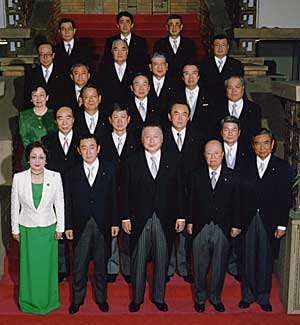
- Prime Minister Yoshirō Mori (front row, centre) with his reshuffled cabinet inside the Kantei, December 5, 2000
- Date formed: December 5, 2000
- Date dissolved: January 6, 2001

People and organisations
- Head of state: Emperor Akihito
- Head of government: Yoshirō Mori
- Member party: LDP-NKP-NCP coalition
- Status in legislature: Majority coalition
- Opposition party: Democratic Party of Japan
- Opposition leader: Yukio Hatoyama

History
- Election: 2000 general election
- Predecessor: Second Mori Cabinet
- Successor: Second Mori Cabinet (Reshuffle after 2001 CGR)

Second Mori Cabinet from December 5, 2000 to January 6, 2001
Portfolio	Minister		Term of Office
Prime Minister	Yoshirō Mori	R	April 5, 2000 - April 26, 2001
Minister of Justice	Masahiko Kōmura	R	December 5, 2000 - April 26, 2001
Minister of Foreign Affairs	Yōhei Kōno	R	October 5, 1999 - April 26, 2001
Minister of Finance	Kiichi Miyazawa	R	July 30, 1998 - April 26, 2001
Minister of Education; Director of the Science and Technology Agency	Nobutaka Machimura	R	December 5, 2000 - January 6, 2001
Minister of Health and Welfare; Minister of Labour	Chikara Sakaguchi	R	December 5, 2000 - January 6, 2001
Minister of Agriculture, Forestry and Fisheries	Yoshio Yatsu	R	December 5, 2000 - 26 April 2001
Minister of International Trade and Industry	Takeo Hiranuma	R	July 4, 2000 - January 6, 2001
Minister of Transport; Minister of Construction; Director of the Hokkaido Development Agency; Director of the National Land Agency	Chikage Ogi	C	July 4, 2000 - January 6, 2001
Minister of Posts and Telecommunications; Minister of Home Affairs; Director of the Management and Coordination Agency	Toranosuke Katayama	C	December 5, 2000 - January 6, 2001
Chief Cabinet Secretary	Yasuo Fukuda	R	October 27, 2000 - May 7, 2004
Director of the National Public Safety Commission	Bunmei Ibuki	R	December 5, 2000 - April 26, 2001
Chairman of the Financial Reconstruction Commission	Hakuo Yanagisawa	R	December 5, 2000 - January 6, 2001
Director of the Japan Defense Agency	Toshitsugu Saito	R	December 5, 2000 - 26 April 2001
Director of the Economic Planning Agency	Fukushiro Nukaga	R	December 5, 2000 - January 6, 2001
Director of the Environment Agency	Yoriko Kawaguchi	-	July 4, 2000 - January 6, 2001
Minister of State for Administrative Reform; Director of the Okinawa Development Agency	Ryutaro Hashimoto	R	December 5, 2000 - January 6, 2001
Minister of State (Science and Technology Policy)	Takashi Sasagawa	R	December 5, 2000 - January 6, 2001
Deputy Secretaries
Deputy Chief Cabinet Secretary (Political Affairs - House of Representatives)	Shinzo Abe	R	July 4, 2000 - September 22, 2003
Deputy Chief Cabinet Secretary (Political Affairs - House of Councillors)	Kosei Ueno	C	July 4, 2000 - September 22, 2003
Deputy Chief Cabinet Secretary (Bureaucrat)	Teijiro Furukawa	-	February 24, 1995 - September 22, 2003

=== Reshuffle after 2001 Central Government Reform ===
Second Mori Cabinet (Reshuffle after 2001 CGR)
- 86th Cabinet of Japan

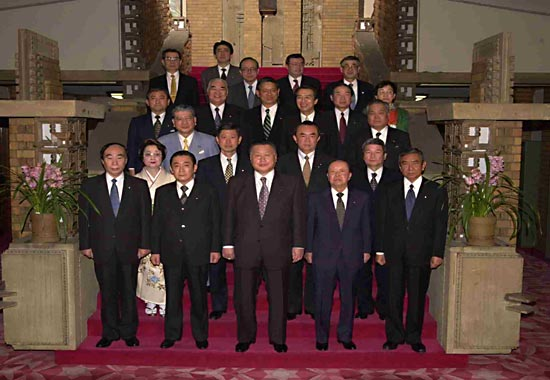
- Prime Minister Yoshirō Mori (front row, centre) with his reshuffled cabinet inside the Kantei, January 6, 2001
- Date formed: January 6, 2001
- Date dissolved: April 26, 2001

People and organisations
- Head of state: Emperor Akihito
- Head of government: Yoshirō Mori
- Member party: LDP-NKP-NCP coalition
- Status in legislature: Majority coalition
- Opposition party: Democratic Party of Japan
- Opposition leader: Yukio Hatoyama

History
- Election: 2000 general election
- Predecessor: Second Mori Cabinet (Reshuffle before 2001 CGR)
- Successor: First Koizumi Cabinet

Second Mori Cabinet from January 6, 2001 to April 26, 2001
Portfolio	Minister		Term of Office
Prime Minister	Yoshirō Mori	R	April 5, 2000 - April 26, 2001
Minister of Finance	Kiichi Miyazawa	R	July 30, 1998 - April 26, 2001
Minister for Internal Affairs and Communications	Toranosuke Katayama	C	January 6, 2001 - September 22, 2003
Minister of Justice	Masahiko Kōmura	R	December 5, 2000 - April 26, 2001
Minister of Foreign Affairs	Yōhei Kōno	R	October 5, 1999 - April 26, 2001
Minister of Education, Culture, Sports, Science and Technology	Nobutaka Machimura	R	January 6, 2001 - April 26, 2001
Minister of Health, Labour, and Welfare	Chikara Sakaguchi	R	January 6, 2001 - September 27, 2004
Minister of Agriculture, Forestry and Fisheries	Yoshio Yatsu	R	December 5, 2000 - April 26, 2001
Minister of Economy, Trade and Industry	Takeo Hiranuma	R	January 6, 2001 - September 22, 2003
Ministry of Land, Infrastructure, Transport and Tourism	Chikage Ogi	C	January 6, 2001 - September 22, 2003
Minister of the Environment	Yoriko Kawaguchi	-	January 6, 2001 - February 8, 2002
Chief Cabinet Secretary; Minister for Gender Equality	Yasuo Fukuda	R	October 27, 2000 - May 7, 2004
Director of the Japan Defense Agency	Toshitsugu Saito	R	December 5, 2000 - April 26, 2001
Director of the National Public Safety Commission; Minister for Disaster Management	Bunmei Ibuki	R	December 5, 2000 - April 26, 2001
Minister of State (Science and Technology Policy)	Takashi Sasagawa	R	January 6, 2001 - April 26, 2001
Minister of State for Financial Services	Hakuo Yanagisawa	R	January 6, 2001 - September 30, 2002
Minister of State for Economic and Fiscal Policy	Fukushiro Nukaga	R	January 6, 2001 - January 23, 2001
Minister of State for Economic and Fiscal Policy	Tarō Asō	R	January 23, 2001 - April 26, 2001
Minister of State for Okinawa and Northern Territories Affairs; Minister of State for Regulatory Reform	Ryutaro Hashimoto	R	January 6, 2001 - April 26, 2001
Deputy Secretaries
Deputy Chief Cabinet Secretary (Political Affairs - House of Representatives)	Shinzo Abe	R	July 4, 2000 - September 22, 2003
Deputy Chief Cabinet Secretary (Political Affairs - House of Councillors)	Kosei Ueno	C	July 4, 2000 - September 22, 2003
Deputy Chief Cabinet Secretary (Bureaucrat)	Teijiro Furukawa	-	February 24, 1995 - September 22, 2003

==== Changes ====
- January 23, 2001 - Economic and Fiscal Policy Minister Fukushiro Nukaga resigned due to his involvement in a bribery scandal, and was replaced by Tarō Asō.
