= Midori Suzuki (educator) =

Japanese media educator, feminist and media researcher

Midori Suzuki (鈴木 みどり, Suzuki Midori; April 28, 1941 – July 23, 2006) was a Japanese media educator, feminist and media researcher. She was professor of Media Studies at the Faculty of Social Sciences of Ritsumeikan University in Kyoto from 1994 until her death.

Suzuki was known for her work on media literacy, especially several seminal textbooks and the over one hundred workshops, symposia and media watch projects that she facilitated. She also introduced overseas research to Japan, for example through translations of work by Jerry Mander, Catharine MacKinnon, David Buckingham) and the Ontario Teacher's Association.

Suzuki was an active member of the World Association of Christian Communication, a co-founder and core member of the Asian Network of Women in Communication, a long-term member of the International Association of Media and Communications Research, and on the International Exchange Committee of the Japan Society for Studies in Journalism and Mass Communication（日本マス・コミュニケーション学会). She also participated in UNESCO-sponsored research and projects, and was involved in the Global Media Monitoring Project (1994, 2000 and 2005), for which she served as a steering committee member and a Japanese liaison.

Although Suzuki had received her master's degree in mass communications from Stanford University in 1966, she soon became critical of the mass communications research approach, especially its inherent view of people as 'passive receivers' or consumers of information. She instead began to develop a citizen-centered approach. Through her work with the Forum for Citizen's Television and Media (FCT), which she co-founded in 1977, she focused on informed criticism of commercial television programming, especially for children, as well as of gender stereotypes and other misconceptions and biases found in the mainstream Japanese media. Suzuki noted that "critical is creative" and saw media literacy as part of a bigger vision for media democratization. An early advocate for communication rights in Japan, she championed an active role for citizens in media society, including in policy making.

== Published works ==
(In Japanese)

- Suzuki, Midori (1992) Terebi - dare no tame no media ka? (Television: Whose Medium?) Tokyo: Gakugeishorin.
- Suzuki, Midori (Ed.) (1997) Media Literashi wo Manabu Hito no Tame ni (For People Learning Media Literacy) Kyoto: Sekai Shisou-sha.
- Suzuki, Midori (1999) Johokashakai ni torikumu kuristoshatachi-WACC no katsudou to sono jissenrinri o chuushin ni (Christians taking on the information society- WACC and its applied ethics). In T. Kuribayashi (Ed.) Sekai ni ikiru (Living in the World), pp. 265–285. Tokyo: Nihonkristokyodan Shuppankyoku.
- Suzuki, Midori (Ed.) (2003) Study Guide Media Literacy [Jendaa hen] (Gender Approach). 2nd edition. Tokyo: Liberta
- Suzuki, Midori (2004) Johokashakai: Digital Divide o chushin ni (Information Society: Focus on the Digital Divide). In S. Inoue, J. Sasaki, H. Tajima & H. Yamamoto (Eds.) Yokuboshakai, pp. 55–72. Tokyo: Nihonbyorishakaigakkai.
- Suzuki, Midori (Ed.) (2004) Study Guide Media Literacy [Nyumonhen] (Introductory Approach). 2nd edition. Tokyo: Liberta
- Suzuki, Midori (2004) Media Shakai no Ronri (Ethics of the Media Society). In Koichi Kasamatsu and Kazuyuki Wada (Eds.) 21 Seiki no Ronri (The Ethics in the 21st Century), pp. 145–197. Tokyo:Hachiyo Shuppan.
