= Eri Ōtsu =

Japanese organic farmer

- Born: Germany
- Education: Keio University; Technical University of Munich
- Occupations: Organic farmer, social activist
- Known for: sustainable farming
- Spouse: Kota Ōtsu
- Children: 4

Eri Ōtsu (大津愛梨, Ōtsu Eri) is a Japanese organic farmer and social activist. She is well known for her significant contributions to the organic farming in Japan. In 2017, she was honored at the United Nations Food and Agriculture Organization.

== Life ==
She was born in Germany and raised in Tokyo. Her parents were farmers who contributed to organic farming in rural areas. Her father was also a businessman in addition to farming.

== Career ==
She graduated from the Faculty of Environment and Information Studies in Keio University in 1998. She also graduated from the Technical University of Munich, Germany. Eri returned to Japan in 2013 after receiving a master's degree and became an organic farmer. She also currently serves as the President of NPO Rural Heroines Organization which is a Japanese national organization for the female farmers.

She also took steps in continuing the organic farming in Kumamoto Prefecture post the 2016 Kumamoto earthquake and launched several projects for the development of rural areas in Japan. She received the Model Farmer Award from the 2017 United Nations Food and Agriculture Organization.
