= Yamada Kōrin =

Japanese doctor (1869–1955)

Yamada Kōrin (山田 弘倫; March 1869 – April 6, 1955), whose first name is also glossed as Hirotomo, was a Japanese medical doctor involved in the promotion of hygiene and dermatology. He co-authored a popular handbook on cutaneous disease. Written with Keizo Dohi (土肥 慶蔵) and Asahi Kenkichi (旭 憲吉), The Diagnosis and Treatment of Skin Disease (皮膚病診断及治療法) was first published in 1901, and its chapters are organized according to pathology.

Yamada served as the head of the Japanese Army's Hygiene Bureau, and he served as the Director of Medical Affairs and the head of the military surgeon division of the Korean army (朝鮮軍軍医部長医務局長) from 1922 to 1923. He later served as the head of the Nippon Medical School Hospital.

== Selected writings ==
- 梅毒図譜 (Atlas of Syphilis) (1901)

A translation of the work of Franz Mracek into Japanese

- 皮膚病診断及治療法 (The Diagnosis and Treatment of Skin Disease) (1901)

Written with Dohi Keizo and Asahi Kenkichi, at least five re printings

- 花柳病診断及治療法 (The Diagnosis and Treatment of Venereal Disease) (1902)

Written with Asahi Kenkichi

- 臨床医学字典 (Character Dictionary of Clinical Medicine) (1903)
- 皮膚病学ヨリノ美容法 (A Dermatologist's Guide to Beauty) (1909)

Translated more accurately as beautification methods from the study of skin disease
