= Kuroda Denta =

Kuroda Denta (黒田 伝太; 1843 - March 8, 1908) was a Japanese samurai of the late Edo period. A retainer of the Niwa clan of Nihonmatsu han, Kuroda fought in the Boshin War, seeing action at the Battle of Bonari Pass. Met the famous Saitō Hajime in a nearby valley following the Imperial Japanese Army's victory.
