= First Mori cabinet =

- 85th Cabinet of Japan

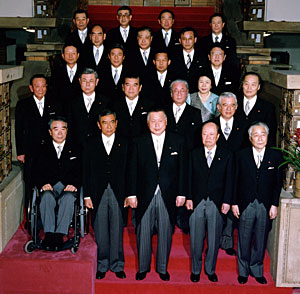
- Prime Minister Yoshirō Mori (front row, centre) with the newly-elected cabinet inside the Kantei, April 5, 2000
- Date formed: April 5, 2000
- Date dissolved: July 4, 2000

People and organisations
- Head of state: Emperor Akihito
- Head of government: Yoshirō Mori
- Member party: LDP-NKP-NCP coalition
- Status in legislature: Majority coalition
- Opposition party: Democratic Party of Japan
- Opposition leader: Yukio Hatoyama

History
- Predecessor: Obuchi (Second reshuffle)
- Successor: Mori II

The First Mori cabinet briefly governed Japan between April and July 2000, after the sudden incapacitation of Prime Minister Keizō Obuchi and his replacement by Yoshirō Mori, who had been LDP Secretary General. Mori called his government "the Japan revival cabinet", but made no personnel changes when he took office, pledging to retain Obuchi's ministers, maintain the 3-party coalition and continue his policies to try to revive the economy.

Mori proved an unpopular Prime Minister due to a series of gaffes and the manner of his coming to power, and called early general elections for June 2000 to pre-empt a continuing decline in the LDP's poll numbers. In the elections, the LDP lost the majority that it had built up through opposition defections since 1996, but the coalition held enough seats to retain government. Therefore, the cabinet was dissolved in July when Mori was re-elected by the National Diet and replaced with the Second Mori Cabinet.

== Election of the prime minister ==
5 April 2000
House of Representatives Absolute majority (251/500) required
Choice	First Vote
Choice	Votes
Yoshirō Mori	335 / 500
Yukio Hatoyama	95 / 500
Others and Abstentions (Including blank ballots)	70 / 500
Source Diet Minutes - 147th Session

== List of ministers ==
Liberal Democratic
New Komeito
New Conservative
Independent
R = Member of the House of Representatives
C = Member of the House of Councillors

=== Cabinet ===
First Mori Cabinet from April 5, 2000 to July 4, 2000
Portfolio	Minister		Term of Office
Prime Minister	Yoshirō Mori	R	April 5, 2000 - April 26, 2001
Minister of Justice	Hideo Usui	R	October 5, 1999 - July 4, 2000
Minister of Foreign Affairs	Yōhei Kōno	R	October 5, 1999 - April 26, 2001
Minister of Finance	Kiichi Miyazawa	R	July 30, 1998 - April 26, 2001
Minister of Education; Director of the Science and Technology Agency	Hirofumi Nakasone	C	October 5, 1999 - July 4, 2000
Minister of Health and Welfare	Yuya Niwa	R	October 5, 1999 - July 4, 2000
Minister of Agriculture, Forestry and Fisheries	Tokuichiro Tamazawa	R	October 5, 1999 - July 4, 2000
Minister of International Trade and Industry	Takashi Fukaya	R	October 5, 1999 - July 4, 2000
Minister of Transport; Director of the Hokkaido Development Agency	Toshihiro Nikai	R	October 5, 1999 - July 4, 2000
Minister of Posts and Telecommunications	Eita Yashiro	R	October 5, 1999 - July 4, 2000
Minister of Labour	Takamori Makino	R	October 5, 1999 - July 4, 2000
Minister of Construction; Director of the National Land Agency	Masaaki Nakayama	R	October 5, 1999 - July 4, 2000
Minister of Home Affairs; Director of the National Public Safety Commission	Kosuke Hori	R	October 5, 1999 - July 4, 2000
Chief Cabinet Secretary; Director of the Okinawa Development Agency	Mikio Aoki	C	October 5, 1999 - July 4, 2000
Chairman of the Financial Reconstruction Commission	Sadakazu Tanigaki	R	February 25, 2000 - July 4, 2000
Director of the Management and Coordination Agency	Kunihiro Tsuzuki	C	October 5, 1999 - December 5, 2000
Director of the Japan Defense Agency	Tsutomu Kawara	R	October 5, 1999 - July 4, 2000
Director of the Economic Planning Agency	Taichi Sakaiya	-	July 30, 1998 - December 5, 2000
Director of the Environment Agency	Kayoko Shimizu	C	October 5, 1999 - July 4, 2000
Deputy Secretaries
Deputy Chief Cabinet Secretary (Political Affairs - House of Representatives)	Fukushiro Nukaga	R	October 5, 1999 - July 4, 2000
Deputy Chief Cabinet Secretary (Political Affairs - House of Councillors)	Soichiro Matsutani	C	October 5, 1999 - July 4, 2000
Deputy Chief Cabinet Secretary (Bureaucrat)	Teijiro Furukawa	-	February 24, 1995 - September 22, 2003
