= Masashi Usami =

Masashi Usami from the KDDI Corporation, Saitama, Japan was named Fellow of the Institute of Electrical and Electronics Engineers (IEEE) in 2015 for contributions to development of high reliability semiconductor optical devices for undersea cable systems.
