= Toshitsugu Saito =

Japanese politician (1944–2026)

- 斉藤 斗志二
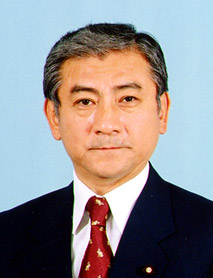
- Official portrait, 2001

Director-General of the Japan Defense Agency
- In office 5 December 2000 – 26 April 2001
- Prime Minister: Junichiro Koizumi
- Preceded by: Kazuo Torashima
- Succeeded by: Gen Nakatani

Member of the House of Representatives
- In office 6 July 1986 – 21 July 2009
- Preceded by: Shigeyoshi Saitō
- Succeeded by: Multi-member district
- Constituency: Shizuoka 2nd (1986–1996); Shizuoka 5th (1996–2003); Tōkai PR (2003–2009)

Personal details
- Born: 27 December 1944 Fuji, Shizuoka, Japan
- Died: 3 October 2026 (aged 81)
- Party: Liberal Democratic
- Parent: Ryoei Saito (father)
- Relatives: Shigeyoshi Saitō (uncle); Hiroyuki Masuoka (father-in-law)
- Education: Sophia University; Waseda University; University of Washington

Toshitsugu Saito (斉藤 斗志二, Saitō Toshitsugu; 27 December 1944 – 3 October 2026) was a Japanese politician of the Liberal Democratic Party who was a member of the House of Representatives in the Diet from 1986 to 2009. A native of Fuji, Shizuoka and graduate of Sophia University, he attended Waseda University for graduate study and business school at the University of Washington in the United States.

From 2001 to 2002 he was Director General of the Japan Defense Agency (now Minister of Defense).

Saito died on 3 October 2026, at the age of 81.

== Sources ==
- 政治家情報 〜斉藤 斗志二〜. www.senkyo.janjan.jp ザ･選挙 (in Japanese). JANJAN.
