= Hisao Taoka =

Japanese engineer

Hisao Taoka from the University of Fukui, Japan was named Fellow of the Institute of Electrical and Electronics Engineers (IEEE) in 2014 for contributions to computing technology for power system analysis and control.
