= Yukihiro Torikai =

Japanese economist (born 1959)

Torikai Yukihiro, a Japanese economist, Ph.D., Economics

Yukihiro Torikai (鳥飼 行博, Torikai Yukihiro; born 1959) is a Japanese economist of Department of Human Development, School of Humanities & Culture, Tokai University (東海大学), which Shyonan campus is located in Hiratuka. His major is development economics and environmental economics for sustainable development from the view point of developing economies.

== Background ==
1959 born in Ibarakiken, Japan

1983 B.A. Economics, Economics Department at Chuo University (中央大学), Tokyo, Japan

1986 M.A. Economics, Economics Department at University of Tokyo (東京大学), Japan

1988 Ph.D. Economics, at University of Tokyo, Japan
Doctoral Dissertation: "Economic Behavior under Uncertainty: Case Studies of Philippine Rice Farmers" Kind of academic degree (Doctor of Economics), Field of academic degree (Economics), Year and Date of conferral of degrees (1988/03/29)

1989-1990 Special Researcher of Japan Society for the Promotion of Science at University of Tokyo, Japan

1990-1996 Lecturer, School of Humanities and Culture, Tokai University

1998-1999 Visitor Researcher of Department of Agricultural Business Administration, Faculty of Agricultural Technology, King Mongkut's Institute of Technology Ladkrabang:KMITL, Bangkok, Thailand

1996–present Associate Professor, School of Humanities and Culture, Tokai University

== Specialty field and themes ==
Development economics and environmental economics, International cooperation, study on grass roots aids, study on the production system of private management firms, sustainable development.

His past research themes include textile production system in villages of Thailand and local technologies for production in China, influence of climate change from the viewpoint of the energy economics and its practice in Kyoto Protocol of the United Nations Framework Convention on Climate Change.

He is currently working on the possible combination of social development and Thai weaving techniques from the conceptual and practical viewpoints.

== Research contents ==
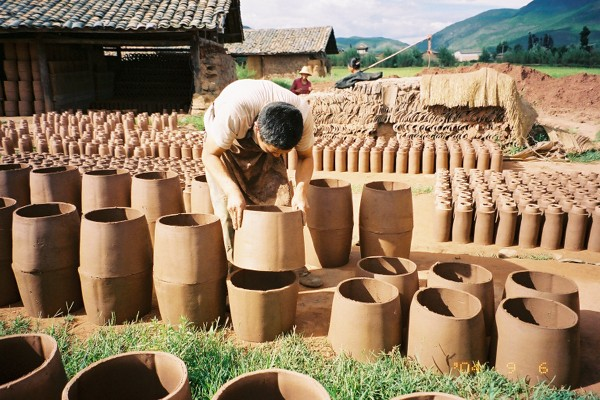
Ceramics makers in Yunnan, China, who have labor-intensive technologies at the local standard

Modern society is globalized, and in such globalized world, materials, money and man move across the national boundaries, contributing to economic development. However, what moves in such a way is not limited to "what is good," and harmful wastes such as mercury and lead move across the national boundaries as narcotic drugs and weapons do.

Development and environment, along with peace and human rights, are intricately intertwined. His research theme is to analyze a flow of materials, money and man in a globalized world, and make economic analysis of "new sustainable development" in due consideration of development, environment, peace and human rights. For this purpose, it is necessary not only to use statistics and data of each country, but also to make a field study by staying in developing nations. He has visited and investigated villages, fishing villages, small factories, slums, and garbage collection sites of Philippines, Thailand, Indonesia, Nepal, China, Mexico and Peru. This kind of research requires knowledge and physical strength.

== Major publications ==
- Economics for Development and Environmental Protection, 1998, University of Tokai Press (ISBN 4486014197 )
- Environmental Problems and International Co-operation, 2001, Seizan-sha (ISBN 4883590585 )
- Social Development and Environmental Protection, 2002, University of Tokai Press (ISBN 4486015851 )
- Environmental Economics of Rural Communities, 2007, Taga-shuppan (ISBN 9784811571317)
- The Century of Warfare: Pictures and Posters, 2008, Seikyu-sha (ISBN 4787220284)
- Nazi Propaganda: Pictures and Posters, 2011, Seikyu-sha (ISBN 478722042X)
- Community Economics: Philippine Rice Terraces and Local Commons, 2015, Tokai University Press (ISBN 4486020480)

== Thesis ==
- Takahashi, Akira; ——; et al. (1998). Evaluation of the Japanese Development Assistance toward the Philippines. Ministry of Foreign Affairs. pp. 1–48.
- ——; et al. (1999). "Economic Development and Nation Building in Peru： Problems after Restructuring in the 1990s". Journal of Behavior and Social Sciences. 1998 (1): 57–72. ISSN 1344-2767.
- —— (1994). "The Structure of Capital Flow and The Post-Cold War: Japan's Role as a Capital Supplier". Journal of the School of Humanities and Culture. 24: 203–232.
