= Radio Barrigada =

U.S. military radio transmitter facilities on the island of Guam

Coordinates: 13.4783°N 144.8378°E

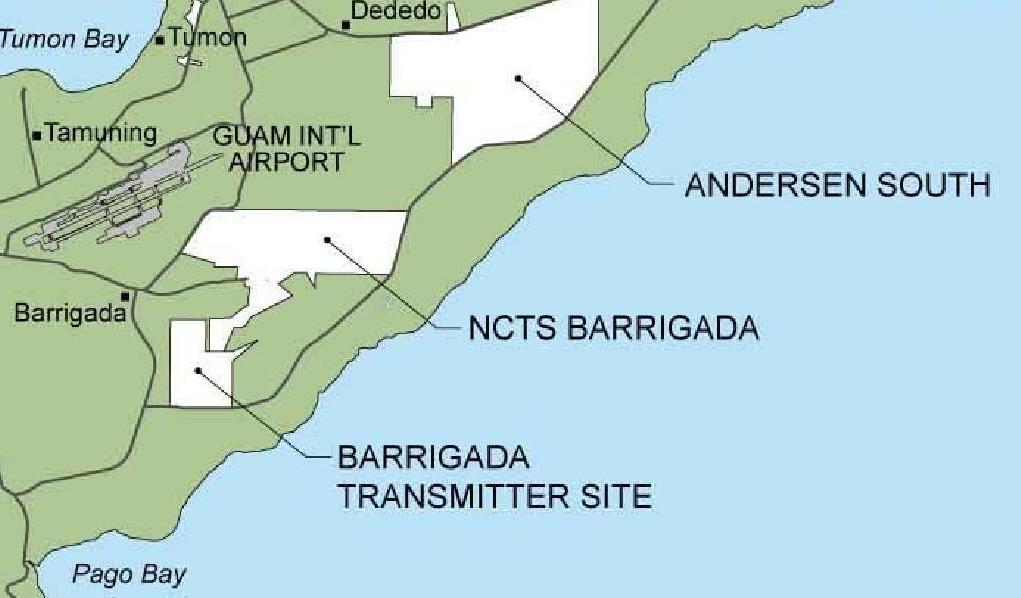
Maps of the two Barrigada military facilities in north-central Guam, southeast of Antonio B. Won Pat International Airport

Radio Barrigada, formally Communications Site Barrigada and previously Communications Annex Barrigada, refers to two adjacent U.S. military transmitter facilities located in the villages of Barrigada and Mangilao on the western Pacific territory of Guam. The larger facility is Naval Computer and Telecommunications Site (NCTS) Barrigada, operated by Naval Base Guam, located entirely within Barrigada.

To its south, the Barrigada Transmitter Site, operated by Andersen Air Force Base, lies partially within Mangilao. The installation itself is managed by Joint Region Marianas. Radio Barrigada is the counterpart to the telecommunications receiving site Naval Computer and Telecommunications Station Guam, located to the north in Finegayan, Dededo. Located near the high point of Mount Barrigada, Radio Barrigada comprises 1,800 acres (7.3 km^{2}).

== History ==
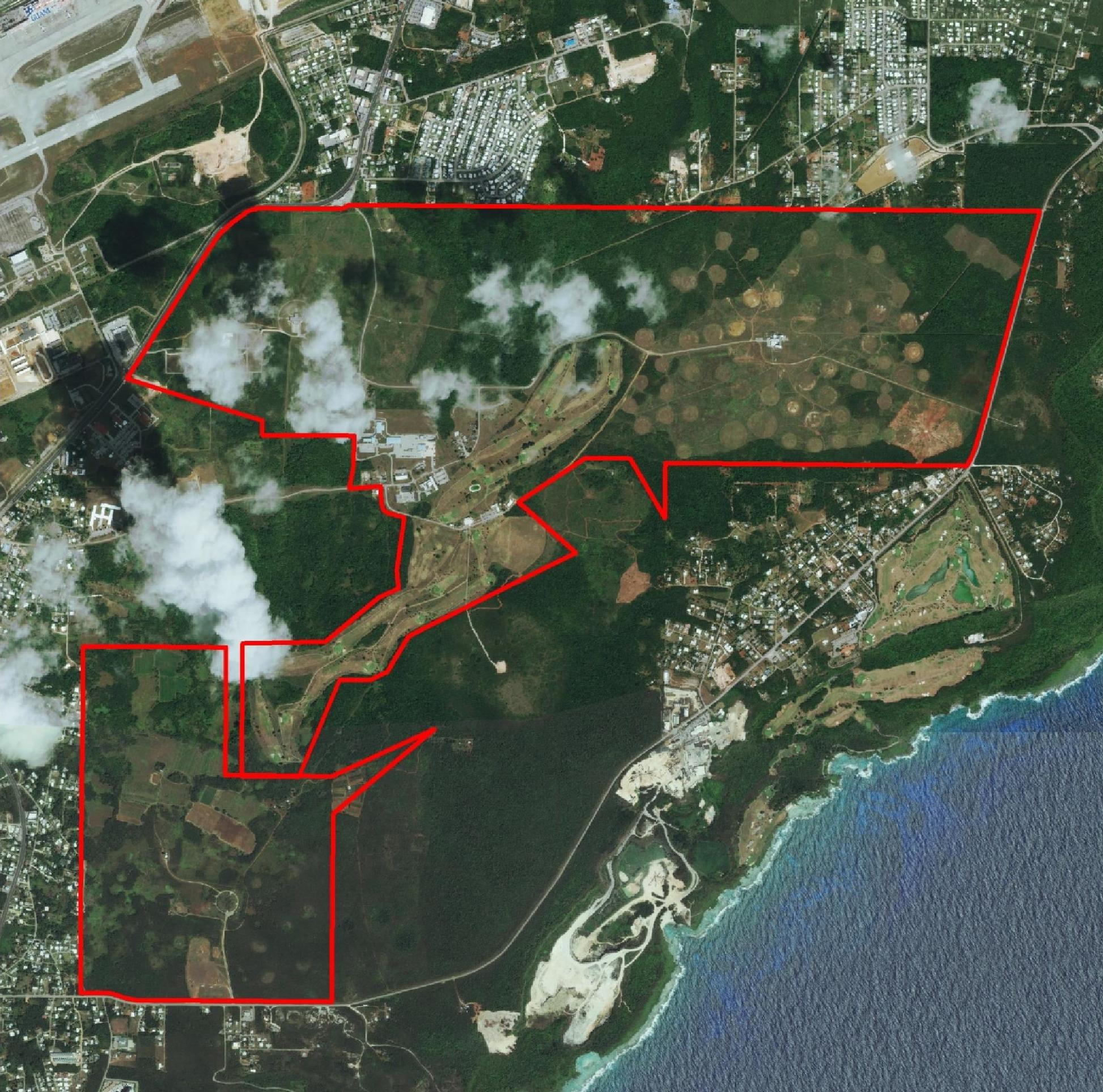
Radio Barrigada in 2012. Circular areas indicate antennas.

It is assumed that the area was inhabited before Spanish contact, as many latte stone sets have been found in the nearby area of Tiyan. During the Spanish-Chamorro Wars of the late seventeenth century, residents were forced into centralized areas as part of the Spanish policy of Reducción. The area was then used for ranching and farming by residents of the centralized villages. Following the U.S. Capture of Guam in 1898, the Naval Government allowed the region to be settled permanently.

During the Japanese occupation of Guam (1941-1945), local residents were forced to labor building the Japanese airfield at Tiyan, which later became Naval Air Station Agana and Antonio B. Won Pat International Airport. After U.S. forces secured the southern island in the Battle of Guam in July 1944, remaining Japanese forces decided to make a stand at Mount Barrigada to delay the U.S. victory as much as possible. The resulting Battle of Barrigada on 2 and 3 August was the fiercest fighting of the latter part of the battle.

After the U.S. victory, the military decided that the location would be used for military facilities, and a military golf course. The Barrigada village center was relocated farther west, where the Navy laid out new streets and plots. The new facilities included Naval Radio Station (Transmitter) (NAVRADSTA (T)) Barrigada. From 1945 to 1946, the Navy operated a shortwave radio communications station NU5Q at Barrigada. More than 200 correspondents accredited to the headquarters of Commander, U.S. Pacific Fleet/Pacific Ocean Areas in Nimitz Hill Annex were allowed to file stories through NU5Q.

During the first six weeks of the Battle of Okinawa, over 300 radio programs were relayed from transmitters aboard USS Eldorado through KU5Q to the mainland U.S. Recordings of the surrender of Japan aboard USS Missouri on 2 September 1945 were sent to a Japanese radio station and flown to Guam for broadcast by NU5Q. The Barrigada broadcast, received by an RCA shortwave communications center near San Francisco, was chosen by U.S. networks as clearer and rebroadcast to the public.

As of 2012, 15 acres (0.061 km^{2}) of Radio Barrigada is leased to the Guam Army National Guard for training. The two facilities share boundaries through the Navy's Admiral Nimitz Golf Course. There is no direct road directly connecting the two. NCTS Barrigada is accessed via Guam Highway 16 in Barrigada. The Air Force's Barrigada Transmitter Site is accessed to the south via Guam Highway 15 in Mangilao.

Radio Barrigada is under construction through at least the year 2025, including the installation of new antennas at Building 51 and new ground radio equipment for military command and control.

== See also ==
- US military installations in Guam
