= List of highways in Guam =

Highways in Guam
- Guam Highway 8 highway marker

System information
- Maintained by Guam DPW
- Formed: c. 1950

Highway names
- Territorial: Guam Highway nn (GH-nn)

System links
- Guam Highways

Highways in Guam are maintained by the Department of Public Works in the United States territory of Guam.

== List ==
Number	Length (mi)	Length (km)	Southern or western terminus	Northern or eastern terminus	Local names	Formed	Removed	Notes
GH-1	21.04	33.86	GH-2A in Sånta Rita-Sumai	GH-9 in Yigo	Marine Drive, Marine Corps Drive	c. 1941	current	
GH-2	—	—	GH-4 in Humåtak	GH-2A at Naval Base Guam Gate 2 in Sånta Rita-Sumai		—	—	
GH-2A	—	—	GH-2 in Sånta Rita-Sumai	GH-1 in Sånta Rita-Sumai		—	—	
GH-3	—	—	GH-1 in Tamuning	GH-3A/GH-9 in Dededo		—	—	
GH-3A	—	—	GH-3/GH-9 in Dededo	Ritidan Point		—	—	
GH-4	—	—	GH-2 in Humåtak	GH-1 in Hagåtña		—	—	
GH-4A	—	—	GH-4 in Talo'fo'fo	GH-17 in Talo'fo'fo		—	—	
GH-5	—	—	GH-2A in Sånta Rita-Sumai	GH-12 in Sånta Rita-Sumai		—	—	
GH-6	—	—	GH-1 in Piti	GH-1 in Asan-Maina		—	—	
GH-7	—	—	GH-6 in Asan-Maina	West O'Brien Drive (to GH-4) in Hagåtña		—	—	
GH-7A	—	—	GH-4 in Hagåtña	GH-8 in Hagåtña		—	—	
GH-7B	—	—	GH-24A in Hagåtña	GH-4 in Hagåtña		—	—	
GH-8	—	—	GH-1 in Hagåtña	T-intersection on the grounds of the US Naval Communication Station, Barrigada	Purple Heart Highway	—	—	
GH-9	3.2	5.1	GH-3/GH-3A in Dededo	GH-1 at entrance to Andersen Air Force Base in Yigo		—	—	
GH-10	—	—	GH-4 in Chalan Pago-Ordot	GH-8 in Barrigada		—	—	
GH-10A	—	—	GH-1 in Tamuning	GH-16 in Barrigada		—	—	Provides access to Antonio B. Won Pat International Airport
GH-11	—	—	Access road to Cabras Island	GH-1 in Piti		—	—	
GH-12	2.0	3.2	GH-2 in Hågat	GH-5 in Sånta Rita-Sumai		—	—	
GH-14	—	—	GH-1 in Tamuning	GH-1 in Tamuning	Chalan San Antonio, Pale San Vitores Road	—	—	
GH-14A	—	—	GH-14 in Tamuning	GH-1 in Tamuning	Tumon Bay Road	—	—	
GH-14B	—	—	GH-14 in Tamuning	GH-1 in Tamuning	Ypao Road	—	—	
GH-15	—	—	GH-4 in Chalan Pago-Ordot	Rear Gate at Andersen Air Force Base	Backroad, Backroad to Andersen	—	—	
GH-16	—	—	GH-8 in Barrigada	GH-1 at Tamuning–Dededo border	Army Drive	—	—	
GH-17	—	—	GH-5 in Sånta Rita-Sumai	GH-4 in Yona	Cross Island Road	—	—	
GH-18	1.4	2.3	Dead end on Drydock Island	GH-1 in Piti		—	—	
GH-24A	—	—	Chalan Canton Tutujan in Sinajana	GH-7/GH-33 in Hagåtña		—	—	
GH-26	—	—	GH-15 in Adacao	GH-1 in Dededo		—	—	
GH-27	1.1	1.8	GH-16 in Dededo	GH-1 in Dededo	Harmon Loop Road, Hamburger Highway	—	—	
GH-27A	2.0	3.2	GH-16 in Dededo	GH-28 in Dededo		—	—	
GH-28	—	—	GH-1 in Dededo	GH-3 in Dededo		—	—	
GH-29	—	—	GH-1 in Yigo	GH-15 in Yigo		—	—	
GH-30	—	—	GH-1 in Tamuning	Guam Memorial Hospital	Gov. Carlos G. Camacho Road	—	—	
GH-30A	—	—	GH-30 in Tamuning	GH-14 in Tamuning	Farenholt Avenue	—	—	
GH-32	—	—	University of Guam	GH-10 in Mangilao		—	—	
GH-33	—	—	GH-7A in Hagåtña	GH-8 in Mongmong-Toto-Maite	Sergeant Roy T. Damian Jr. Street, Kanada Toto Loop Road	—	—	
GH-34	—	—	GH-1 in Dededo	Dededo		—	—	
