= Guam Highway 10A =

Highway in Guam

Guam Highway 10A
- GH-10A highlighted in red

Route information
- Maintained by Guam Department of Public Works

Major junctions
- West end: GH-1 in Tamuning
- East end: GH-16 in Barrigada

Location
- Country: United States
- Territory: Guam

Highway system
- Guam Highways
← GH-10	→ GH-11

Guam Highway 10A (GH-10A) is one of the primary automobile highways in the United States territory of Guam.

== Route description ==
GH-10A is one of a number of orphaned suffixed routes on Guam; it bears no physical connection to its parent, GH-10 located elsewhere in Barrigada. In fact, GH-10A (named Chalan Pasaheru) is considered a very important route in its own right, as its primary purpose is to provide access to Antonio B. Won Pat International Airport. It runs from GH-1 in the resort area of Tamuning eastward to GH-16 in Barrigada. Although unnumbered, there is a key junction along the route into the Tiyan area that was once Naval Air Station Guam. The intersection provides a further link into Barrigada as well as access to other airport and industrial facilities. The eastern terminus at GH-16 is unique by Guam standards in that it is a grade-separated single-point urban interchange rather than an intersection. Although the designation ends at GH-16 the road itself continues eastward into Dededo as GH-25 (Alageta Road), eventually connecting with GH-26

== Major intersections ==
Location	mi	km	Destinations	Notes
Tamuning			GH-1	Western terminus
Barrigada			GH-16	Eastern terminus; Guam's sole interchange
Dededo			GH-25	Continuation after terminus
1.000 mi = 1.609 km; 1.000 km = 0.621 mi
