= Guam Highway 17 =

Highway in Guam

Guam Highway 17
- Cross Island Road
- GH-17 highlighted in red

Route information
- Maintained by Guam Department of Public Works

Major junctions
- West end: GH-5 in Santa Rita
- GH-4A in Talofofo
- East end: GH-4 in Yona

Location
- Country: United States
- Territory: Guam

Highway system
- Guam Highways
← GH-16	→ GH-18

Guam Highway 17 (GH-17) (named Cross Island Road) is one of the primary automobile highways in the United States territory of Guam.

== Route description ==
GH-17 provides a more direct route across the southern part of the island, running from GH-5 in the western village of Santa Rita to GH-4 along the east coast in Yona. GH-4A also splits off the road in Talofofo to provide a more southerly connection to GH-4.

== Major intersections ==
Location	mi	km	Destinations	Notes
Santa Rita			GH-5 to GH-2A – Santa Rita	Western terminus
Talofofo			GH-4A south	
Yona			GH-4 – Inarajan	Eastern terminus
1.000 mi = 1.609 km; 1.000 km = 0.621 mi
