= Guam Premier Outlets =

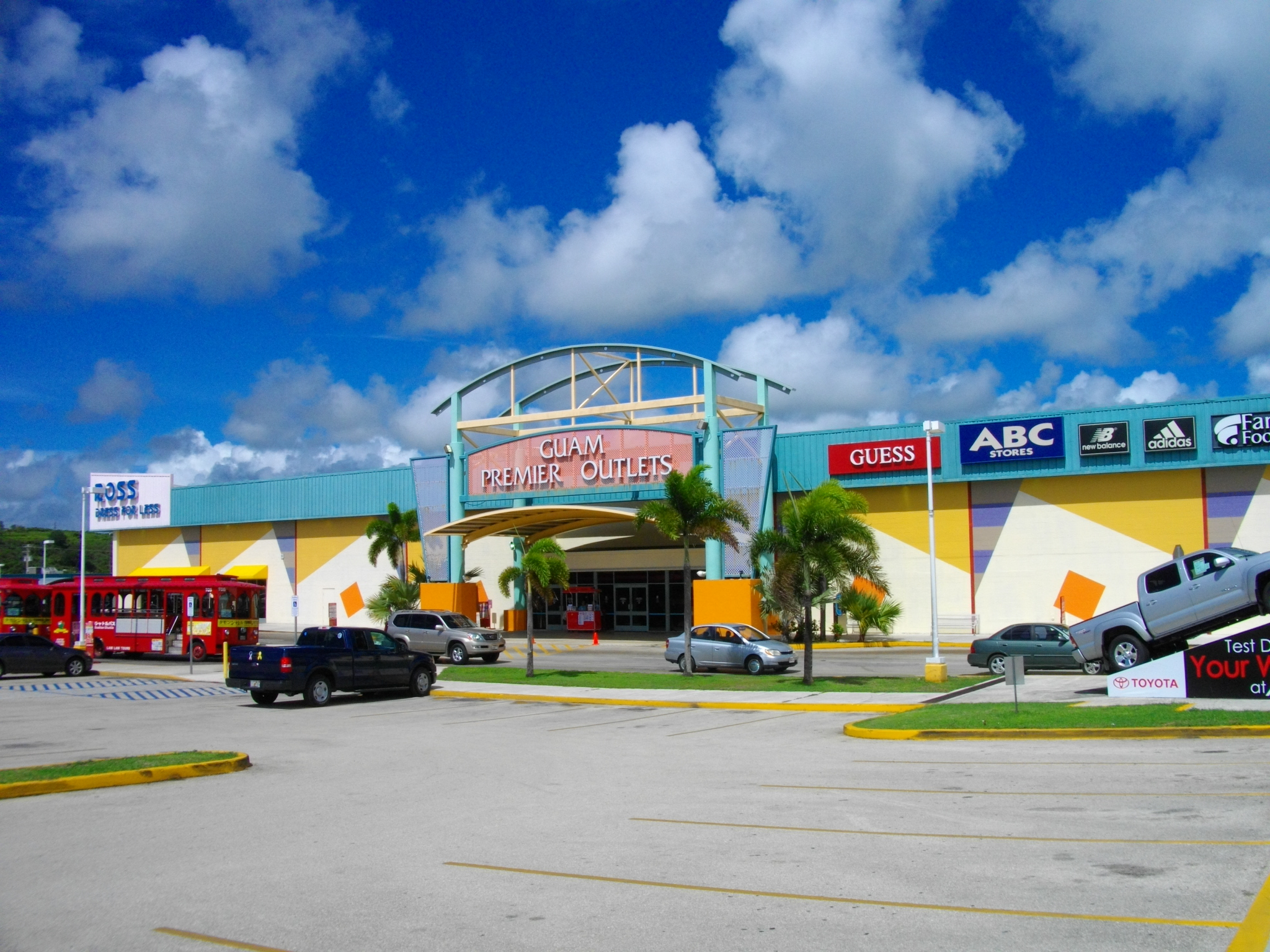
- Exterior view (July 2010)
- Location: Tamuning, Guam, U.S.
- Coordinates: 13°29′22.61″N 144°46′53.85″E
- Address: 199 Chalan San Antonio; Tamuning, Guam 96913
- Opened: 1997
- Owner: S199 Real Estate LLC
- Num. of stores: 47 (39 inside, 8 outside)
- Num. of anchor tenants: 1
- Floors: 2
- Website: www.gpoguam.com

Guam Premier Outlets or GPO (formerly known as Guam Shopping Center and Guam Premium Outlets) (Japanese:グアムプレミアアウトレット) (Korean: 괌 프리미어 아울렛) (Russian: Премиальные аутлеты Гуама), located along GH-14, is an enclosed outlet mall located in Tamuning, Guam. GPO is the only outlet mall in the United States territory of Guam with Ross Dress for Less being the only anchor of the mall.

Located just north of the island's busiest intersection of Marine Corps Drive (Route 1) and Chalan San Antonio (Route 14), stores at GPO include Calvin Klein, GUESS?, Levi's, Tommy Hilfiger, Nike, Skechers, Famous Footwear and ABC Stores. Notable restaurants inside the mall include KFC, Cinnabon, Häagen-Dazs, Cold Stone Creamery, Panda Express (with Tea Bar), Subway, Charleys Philly Steaks, Taco Bell, and Chatime. Stand-alone restaurants include Ruby Tuesday, Wendy's, Longhorn Steakhouse, Applebee's, and King's. Other places on the outskirts of the mall include a Regal Multiplex.

A Chuck E. Cheese's opened at GPO in November 2010, being the first such location for the chain in the territory. The location would operate for 10 years until closing in October 2020 as a result of the COVID-19 pandemic.

GPO is served by Guam's private tourist bus systems and public transit buses.
