= Guam Highway 1 =

Highway in Guam

Guam Highway 1
- Marine Corps Drive
- GH-1 highlighted in red

Route information
- Maintained by Guam DPW
- Length: 21.04 mi (33.86 km)
- Existed: c. 1941–present

Major junctions
- West end: GH-2A / Entrance Gate to Naval Base Guam in Santa Rita
- GH-18 in Piti; GH-6 in Asan; GH-4 in Hagåtña; GH-8 in Hagåtña; GH-16 in Tamuning; GH-3 in Dededo
- East end: GH-9 / Entrance Gate to Andersen AFB in Yigo

Location
- Country: United States
- Territory: Guam

Highway system
- Guam Highways
← GH-34	→ GH-2

Guam Highway 1 (GH-1), also known as Marine Corps Drive, is one of the primary automobile routes in the United States territory of Guam. It runs in a southwest-to-northeast direction, from the main gate of Naval Base Guam in the southwestern village of Santa Rita in a northeasterly direction to the main gate of Andersen Air Force Base in the village of Yigo. It passes through Guam's capital, Hagåtña, as well as intersecting other territorial highways. The highway runs through tropical forest, urbanized commercial areas, and residential neighborhoods. The US military upgraded and extended the road starting in 1941. Construction ceased with the Japanese invasion in December 1941 and resumed after the Second Battle of Guam in 1944. The highway was formally dedicated to the U.S. Marine Corps by the governor in 2004.

== Route description ==
The southern end of GH-1 begins near the entrance gate to Naval Base Guam, at a junction with GH-2A. Known as Marine Corps Drive, the route then travels to the northeast through tropical forests along Apra Harbor to the town of Piti. After passing through Piti, the drive runs along Tepungon Beach before passing Asan Point. It runs parallel to the coast along War in the Pacific National Historical Park's Asan Invasion Beach through the community of Asan. At Ricardo J. Bordallo Governor's Complex in Adelup, it passes northward through the western edge of Hagåtña. In this area, GH-1 runs through commercial areas parallel to the West Agaña Beach Front area. The drive passes the Paseo de Susana and Skinner Plaza before following Trinchera Beach northeasterly through town.

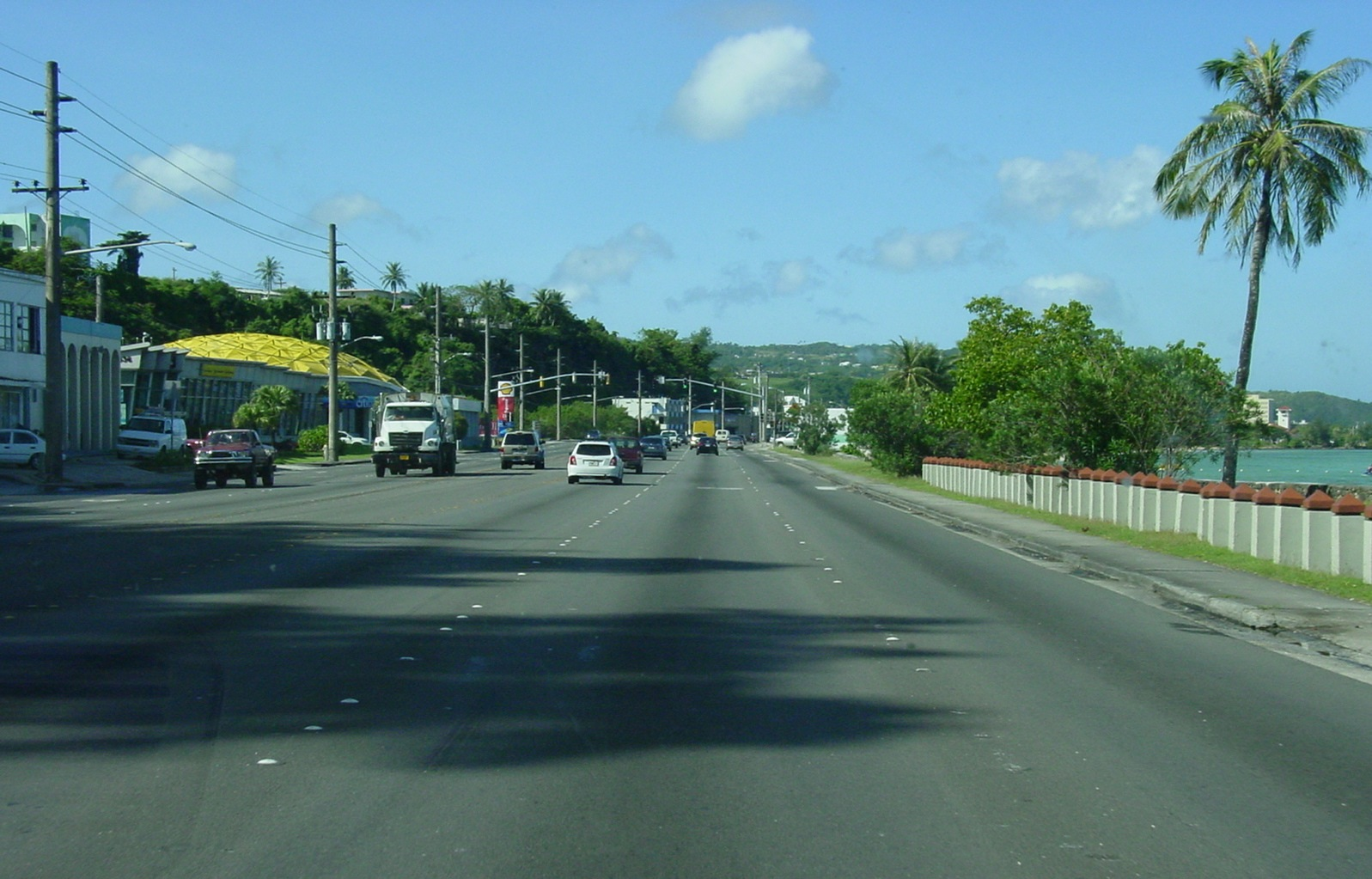
Marine Corps Drive on Guam

After passing through the Hagåtña and an area of Mongmong-Toto-Maite below the cliffline, the road turns towards the northeast and reaches typically its most congested section in Tamuning at the intersection with Guam Highway 14. Curving northwest past the intersection with Guam Highway 10A that leads to Antonio B. Won Pat International Airport, Marine Drive passes John F. Kennedy High School and the area of Upper Tumon. It curves northeasterly around the Micronesia Mall and inland areas of upper, losing sight of the ocean, before turning inland and southeasterly through residential areas as it cuts across the southern edges of Dededo. It runs to the south of the Guam International Country Club and north of the forested military property known as Andersen South. Marine Corps Drive passes the War Dead Cemetery and turns northeasterly with residential areas on both sides of the roadway through Yigo before reaching its terminus at Salisbury Junction, the main entrance to the Air Force Base, where the road continues to the northwest as GH-9.

Like most major highways on Guam, a 35 mph (56 km/h) speed limit is posted throughout most of its length. In the past, GH-1 was one of the few roads to post a 45 mph (72 km/h) limit on lengths of less-developed roadway. However, as more of the area became developed, certain sections of the roads were posted with lower limits. Travelers heading north away from the developed areas are allowed a 45 mph (72 km/h) speed limit. However, the southbound lanes on the same sections remain posted at 35 mph (56 km/h) due to development on the western side of the road.

== History ==
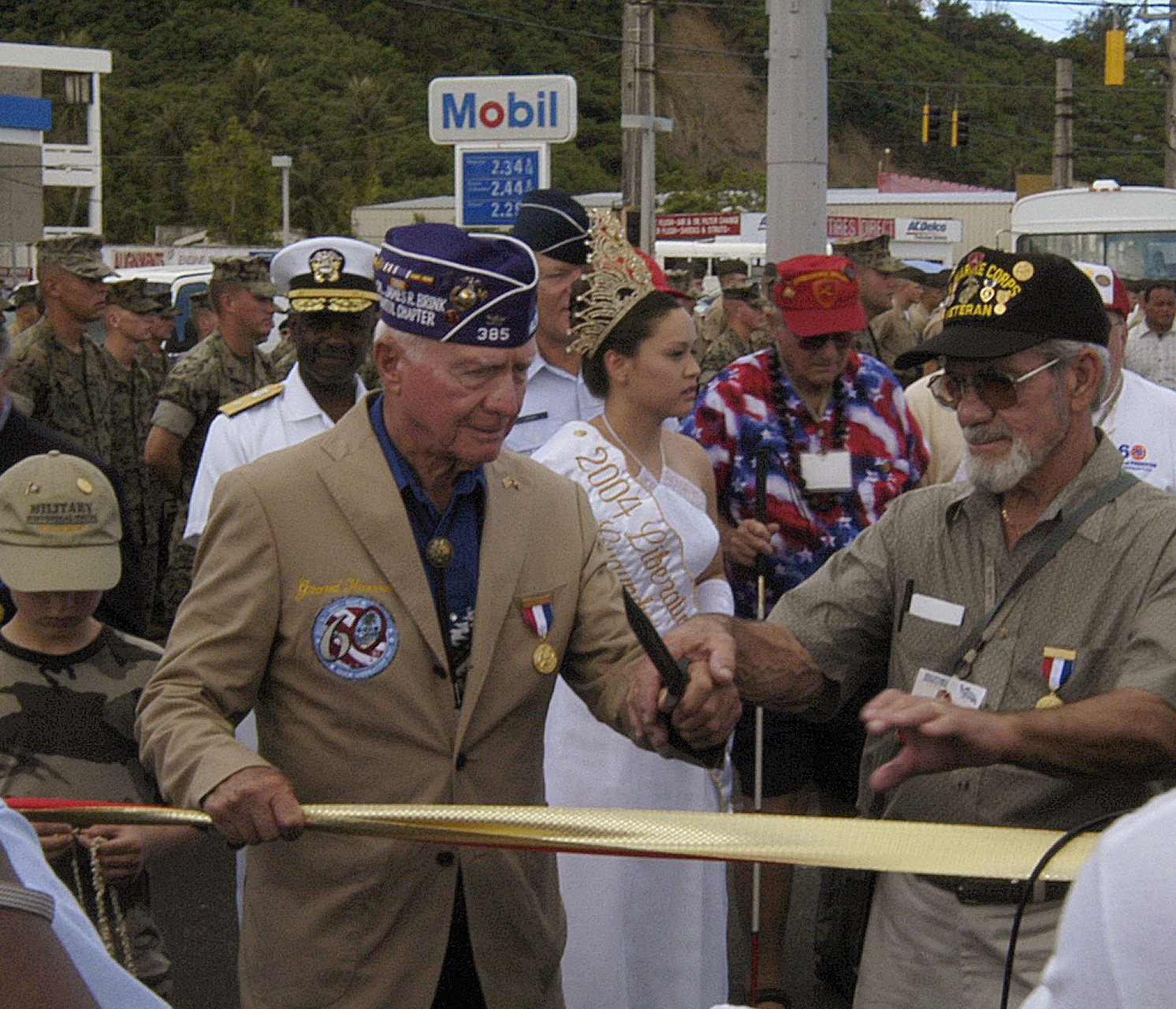
Retired WWII veteran, U.S. Marine Corps Colonel Fraser West, left, prepares to cut the ribbon officially renaming GH-1 to Marine Corps Drive

The United States military began to develop and construct roads on the island in 1941. Some roads had existed prior to this, but improvements were beginning to take shape. Only one road, which encircled most of the island, had been graded. It was the primary route linking Agana (the name of the capital at the time) to Piti and Asan. This was the foundation for Marine Corps Drive. After the Japanese invasion, little infrastructure improvements were made by the occupiers. Road construction resumed by the US military after the island was invaded in 1944. In 60 days, a 12-mile (19 km), four-lane super-highway with nine bridges was built after the invasion. The remainder of the roadway was built and numbered under the local administration after Guam was given civil government in 1950.

The road was known as simply Marine Drive until it was rededicated by Governor Felix Perez Camacho in 2004. In 2012, the DPW has started to install LED streetlights along Marine Corps Drive. At the same time, construction has started to replace the Agana Bridge along GH-1.

== Major intersections ==
Location	mi	km	Destinations	Notes
Santa Rita	0.00	0.00	Entrance to Naval Base Guam	Western terminus
Santa Rita	0.05	0.080	GH-2A south – Agat	Northern terminus of GH-2A
Piti	2.72	4.38	GH-18 west – Port Authority Beach	Eastern terminus of GH-18
Piti	2.82	4.54	GH-6 east – Nimitz Hill	Western terminus of GH-6
Piti	3.10	4.99	GH-11 west – Commercial Port	Eastern terminus of GH-11
Asan	6.00	9.66	GH-6 west – Nimitz Hill	Eastern terminus of GH-6
Hagåtña	7.66	12.33	GH-4 west – Sinajana	Eastern terminus of GH-4
Hagåtña	7.84	12.62	GH-8 east (Purple Heart Highway) – Mongmong	Western terminus of GH-8
Tamuning	10.34	16.64	GH-14B north (Ypao Road) – Tumon	Southern terminus of GH-14B
Tamuning	10.70	17.22	GH-10A east – Airport	Western terminus of GH-10A
Tumon	11.30	18.19	GH-14A north – Tumon	Southern terminus of GH-14A
Tumon	13.19	21.23	GH-16 east – Barrigada	Western terminus of GH-16
Tumon	13.29	21.39	GH-34 west	Southern terminus of GH-34
Tumon	13.79	22.19	GH-3 north	Southern terminus of GH-3
Dededo	13.99	22.51	GH-27A west	Eastern terminus of GH-27A
Dededo	14.70	23.66	GH-27 west	Eastern terminus of GH-27
Dededo	15.11	24.32	GH-26 south – Mangilao	Northern terminus of GH-26
Dededo	15.30	24.62	GH-28 north	Southern terminus of GH-28
Yigo	18.92	30.45	GH-29 east to GH-15	Western terminus of GH-29
Yigo	21.04	33.86	GH-9 – Andersen AFB	Eastern terminus; entrance to Andersen Air Force Base
1.000 mi = 1.609 km; 1.000 km = 0.621 mi
