= Guam Highway 10 =

Highway in Guam

Guam Highway 10
- GH-10 highlighted in red

Route information
- Maintained by Guam Department of Public Works

Major junctions
- West end: GH-4 in Chalan Pago-Ordot
- GH-32 in Mangilao; GH-15 in Mangilao
- East end: GH-8 in Barrigada

Location
- Country: United States
- Territory: Guam

Highway system
- Guam Highways
← GH-9	→ GH-10A

Guam Highway 10 (GH-10) is one of the primary automobile highways in the United States territory of Guam.

== Route description ==
GH-10 begins at a junction off GH-4 near Pago Bay. It trends eastward into the coastal village of Mangilao. GH-32 then spurs off the route towards the University of Guam. GH-10 then turns generally northward and intersects GH-15 before crossing into Barrigada and ending at a junction with GH-8. The road itself continues beyond the intersection into the Tiyan area, formerly Naval Air Station Guam. Although there exists a suffixed GH-10A, it is not in any way connected to GH-10: being located on the other side of Tiyan and primarily serving Antonio B. Won Pat International Airport.

== Major intersections ==
Location	mi	km	Destinations	Notes
Chalan Pago-Ordot			GH-4	Western terminus
Mangilao			GH-32	
Mangilao			GH-15	
Barrigada			GH-8	Eastern terminus
1.000 mi = 1.609 km; 1.000 km = 0.621 mi
