= Guam Highway 12 =

Highway in Guam

Guam Highway 12
- GH-12 highlighted in red

Route information
- Maintained by Guam Department of Public Works
- Length: 3.2 km (2.0 mi)

Major junctions
- West end: GH-2 in Agat
- East end: GH-5 in Santa Rita

Location
- Country: United States
- Territory: Guam

Highway system
- Guam Highways
← GH-11	→ GH-14

Guam Highway 12 (GH-12) is one of the primary automobile highways in the United States territory of Guam.

== Route description ==
GH-12 is a short connector route that runs eastward from GH-2 through the northern part of residential Agat towards the Ordnance Annex Naval facility in Santa Rita. At the entrance, GH-12 turns north and connects to GH-5 running north then west.

== Major intersections ==
Location	mi	km	Destinations	Notes
Agat			GH-2	Western terminus
Santa Rita			GH-5	Eastern terminus
1.000 mi = 1.609 km; 1.000 km = 0.621 mi
