= SR27 =

SR27 or similar terms may refer to:

- Various highways named "State Route 27" or "State Road 27", see List of highways numbered 27
- Sr27 (gene), a rye immunity gene found in some Triticeae
