= Guam Highway 8 =

Highway in Guam

Guam Highway 8
- Purple Heart Highway
- GH-8 highlighted in red

Route information
- Maintained by Guam Department of Public Works

Major junctions
- West end: GH-1 in Hagåtña
- GH-33 in Mongmong-Toto-Maite GH-10 in Barrigada GH-16 in Barrigada
- East end: Unnumbered road in Barrigada

Location
- Country: United States
- Territory: Guam

Highway system
- Guam Highways
← GH-7	→ GH-9

Guam Highway 8 (GH-8) is one of the primary automobile highways in the United States territory of Guam.

== Route description ==
The route is one of the more important highways in the island and is designated the Purple Heart Highway. The primary means of traversing the plateaued central part of the island, the route begins running south from a junction with GH-1 and almost immediately curves eastward into Mongmong-Toto-Maite. It shortly intersects the east end of GH-33, which provides a route into downtown Hagåtña. From there, the route continues eastward into the community of Barrigada. A significant amount of the land north of the road was once Naval Air Station Agana, and GH-8 used to be the primary route to the base, but after the Base Realignment and Closure Commission chose to have its operations relocated, the base was closed and the land has been returned to the local government, which has restored the area's original name of Tiyan. Most of the land has been used to expand the adjacent Antonio B. Won Pat International Airport and support industrial operations, so the main road in Tiyan remains an important though unnumbered highway junction. Towards its east end, GH-8 junctions two other important routes: GH-10 towards Mangilao and the south coast and GH-16 back north towards Tamuning and Dededo. Traffic at the latter junction defaults to GH-16 for travel towards GH-1. GH-8 then curves east-northeast through undeveloped land before emerging at the US Naval Communication Station, Barrigada, a Naval facility dominated by the Admiral Nimitz Golf Course. The route itself ends at an unremarkable T-intersection within the grounds.

== Major intersections ==
Location	mi	km	Destinations	Notes
Hagåtña			GH-1	Western terminus
Mongmong-Toto-Maite			GH-33	
Barrigada			GH-10	
Barrigada			GH-16	
1.000 mi = 1.609 km; 1.000 km = 0.621 mi
