= List of highways numbered 27A =

The following highways are numbered 27A:

== United States ==
- Maryland Route 27A
- Nebraska Spur 27A
- New York State Route 27A
  - County Route 27A
  - County Route 27A (St. Lawrence County, New York)
  - County Route 27A (Westchester County, New York)

Territories

- Guam Highway 27A

Preceded by 27	Lists of highways sharing the same number 27A	Succeeded by 28
