= Guam Highway 5 =

Highway in Guam

Guam Highway 5
- GH-5 highlighted in red

Route information
- Maintained by Guam Department of Public Works
- Length: 6.5 km (4.0 mi)

Major junctions
- West end: GH-2A in Santa Rita
- GH-17 in Santa Rita
- East end: GH-12 in Santa Rita

Location
- Country: United States
- Territory: Guam

Highway system
- Guam Highways
← GH-4	→ GH-6

Guam Highway 5 (GH-5) is one of the primary automobile highways in the United States territory of Guam.

== Route description ==
The western end of GH-5 is in Santa Rita at a junction with GH-2A. The roadway runs east and then turns south through Apra Heights, intersecting with the western terminus of GH-17, Cross Island Road. The eastern end of the roadway is at an intersection with GH-12 at the entrance to the Ordnance Annex.

== Major intersections ==
The entire route is in Santa Rita.

mi	km	Destinations	Notes
		GH-2A	Western terminus
		GH-17	
		GH-12	Eastern terminus
1.000 mi = 1.609 km; 1.000 km = 0.621 mi
