= Guam Highway 3 =

Highway in Guam

Guam Highway 3
- GH-3 highlighted in red

Route information
- Maintained by Guam Department of Public Works

Major junctions
- South end: GH-1 in Tamuning
- GH-28 in Gugagon
- North end: GH-3A / GH-9 in Dededo

Location
- Country: United States
- Territory: Guam

Highway system
- Guam Highways
← GH-2	→ GH-4

Guam Highway 3 (GH-3) is one of the primary automobile highways in the United States territory of Guam.

== Route description ==
It runs in a south to north direction, from a junction with GH-1 near the Micronesia Mall in the southern community of Tamuning in a general northeasterly direction to the community of Dededo, where it meets GH-3A and GH-9. In between, it passes Naval Computer and Telecommunications Station Guam and the newly-established Marine Corps Base Camp Blaz.

== Major intersections ==
Location	mi	km	Destinations	Notes
Tamuning			GH-1	Southern terminus
Gugagon			GH-28	
Dededo			GH-3A; GH-9	Northern terminus
1.000 mi = 1.609 km; 1.000 km = 0.621 mi

== Suffixed route ==
Guam Highway 3A
- Location: Tamuning–Dededo

Guam Highway 3A (GH-3A) connects GH-3 and GH-9 to Ritidian Point at the northern tip of the island of Guam in Dededo. It is undergoing expansion to accommodate increased activity from the activation of Camp Blaz.
