= Guam Highway 14 =

Highway in Guam

Guam Highway 14
- Chalan San Antonio; Pale San Vitores Road
- GH-14 highlighted in red

Route information
- Maintained by Guam Department of Public Works

Major junctions
- West end: GH-1 in Tamuning
- GH-30A in Tamuning GH-14A in Tamuning GH-14B in Tamuning
- East end: GH-1 in Tamuning

Location
- Country: United States
- Territory: Guam

Highway system
- Guam Highways
← GH-12	→ GH-15
← GH-30	GH-30A	→ GH-31

Guam Highway 14 (GH-14) is one of the primary automobile highways in the United States territory of Guam.

== Route description ==
GH-14, a diversion route off Guam Highway 1, is the resort road of Guam. It and its suffixed child routes are the means to reach the resorts and beaches of Tumon Bay, Guam's primary resort area. The road begins running north off a four-way junction with GH-1 at the Guam International Trade Center building: the busiest intersection on Guam in terms of traffic density. Known at this point as Chalan San Antonio, the route passes Guam Premier Outlets, one of the bigger shopping centers on the island, as well as various other commercial facilities. After passing GH-30A, GH-14 passes three schools and the remnants of Guam Greyhound Park: a dog racing track which closed in 2008 due to declining revenues (the territorial government outlawed the practice two years later). Eventually, Chalan San Antonio reaches the shrine of Padre Diego Luis de San Vitores and enters a roundabout (a statue of Padre San Vitores stands in the middle of the roundabout). GH-14 continues east along Pale San Vitores Road into lower Tumon and Guam's resort strip. As the route curves to the north along the strip, child routes (see below) provide quick connections back to GH-1. GH-14 finally itself turns east up the hill at the last connector to end at a direct junction with GH-1.

== Major intersections ==
The entire route is in Tamuning.

mi	km	Destinations	Notes
		GH-1	Western terminus
		GH-30A	
		GH-14A	
		GH-14B	
		GH-1	Eastern terminus
1.000 mi = 1.609 km; 1.000 km = 0.621 mi

== Suffixed routes ==
Guam Highway 14A
- Location: Tamuning, Guam

Guam Highway 14A (GH-14A), known as Tumon Bay Road, connects GH-14 to GH-1 in Tamuning, approximately halfway along the diversion.

Guam Highway 14B
- Location: Tamuning, Guam

Guam Highway 14B (GH-14B), known as Ypao Road, connects GH-14 to GH-1 in Tamuning, approximately halfway between Chalan San Antonio and GH-14A.
