= Guam Highway 15 =

Highway in Guam

Guam Highway 15
- GH-15 highlighted in red

Route information
- Maintained by Guam Department of Public Works

Major junctions
- West end: GH-4 in Chalan Pago-Ordot
- GH-10 in Mangilao GH-26 in Mangilao GH-29 in Yigo
- East end: Rear Gate to Andersen AFB

Location
- Country: United States
- Territory: Guam

Highway system
- Guam Highways
← GH-14	→ GH-16

Guam Highway 15 (GH-15) is one of the primary automobile highways in the United States territory of Guam.

== Route description ==
GH-15's route covers mainly the northeast coast of Guam. Beginning off of GH-4 in Chalan Pago-Ordot, GH-15 proceeds eastward into Mangilao, where it intersects GH-10. GH-15 continues east until it approaches the east coast. From there, GH-15 generally follows the coastline. Towards the northern edge of Mangilao, GH-15 meets the southern end of GH-26, heading north towards Dededo. GH-15 eventually crosses into Yigo and starts moving gradually inland. Shortly after passing GH-15's most notable attraction, the Guam International Raceway, GH-15 makes its final major junction, with GH-29, a connector to GH-1 and the main gate to Andersen Air Force Base. GH-15 finally continues north until it ends at Andersen AFB's rear gate.

== Major intersections ==
Location	mi	km	Destinations	Notes
Chalan Pago-Ordot			GH-4 – Yona, Hagåtña	Western terminus
Mangilao			GH-10 to GH-4 – Barrigada	
Mangilao			GH-26 north – Dededo	
Yigo			GH-29 west to GH-1	
Yigo			Andersen AFB Rear Gate	Eastern terminus
1.000 mi = 1.609 km; 1.000 km = 0.621 mi
