= Guam Highway 9 =

Highway in Guam

Guam Highway 9
- GH-9 highlighted in red

Route information
- Maintained by Guam Department of Public Works
- Length: 5.1 km (3.2 mi)

Major junctions
- West end: GH-3 / GH-3A in Dededo
- East end: GH-1 in Yigo/ Entrance Gate to Andersen AFB

Location
- Country: United States
- Territory: Guam

Highway system
- Guam Highways
← GH-8	→ GH-10

Guam Highway 9 (GH-9) is one of the primary automobile highways in the United States territory of Guam.

== Route description ==
This northern route is a relatively short connector between GH-3 (and its spur route GH-3A) and GH-1, skirting the southern reaches of Andersen Air Force Base. At the western terminus, traffic defaults onto GH-3 heading south back towards Dededo through the Finegayan area while at the eastern terminus, at the main entrance to Andersen AFB, traffic defaults onto GH-1 heading south back into Yigo proper.

== Major intersections ==
Location	mi	km	Destinations	Notes
Dededo			GH-3; GH-3A	Western terminus
Yigo			GH-1	Eastern terminus
1.000 mi = 1.609 km; 1.000 km = 0.621 mi
