= List of highways numbered 27 =

Route 27, or Highway 27, may refer to:

== Australia ==
- Burke Developmental Road (Queensland)
- Zeehan Highway (Tasmania)

== Canada ==
- Alberta Highway 27
- British Columbia Highway 27
- Manitoba Highway 27
- Prince Edward Island Route 27
- Saskatchewan Highway 27

Ontario

- Ontario Highway 27
  - York Regional Road 27, formerly Highway 27 in York Region
  - Simcoe County Road 27, formerly Highway 27 in Simcoe County

== Chile ==
- Chile Route 27

== Costa Rica ==
- National Route 27

== Croatia ==
- D27 road (Croatia)

== Czech Republic ==
- part of I/27 Highway; Czech: cz:Silnice I/27

== France ==
- A27 autoroute
- Route nationale 27

== Germany ==
- Bundesautobahn 27
- Bundesstraße 27

== Greece ==
- A27 motorway, from Kozani to Ptolemaida and from Florina to Niki
- A27 road, a limited-access road from Ptolemaida to Florina
- EO27 road, from Amfissa to Bralos

== India ==
- National Highway 27 (India)

== Iran ==
- Road 27

== Ireland ==
- N27 road (Ireland)

== Italy ==
- Autostrada A27

== Japan ==
- Japan National Route 27
- Maizuru-Wakasa Expressway

== Korea, South ==
- Suncheon–Wanju Expressway
- National Route 27

== Malaysia ==
- East Klang Valley Expressway
- FT 27 KLIA Outer Ring Road

== Montenegro ==
- R-27 regional road (Montenegro)

== Netherlands ==
- A27 motorway (Netherlands)

== New Zealand ==
- New Zealand State Highway 27

== Norway ==
- Norwegian County Road 27

== Russia ==
- M27 highway (Russia)

== Spain ==
- Autovía A-27

== Switzerland ==
- European route E27 (partly also in France and Italy)

== United Kingdom ==
- British A27 (Whiteparish-Pevensey)
- M27 (Cadnam-Portsmouth)

== United States ==
- Interstate 27
- U.S. Route 27
- Alabama State Route 27
  - County Route 27 (Lee County, Alabama)
- Arkansas Highway 27
  - Arkansas Highway 27B
  - Arkansas Highway 27N (former)
- California State Route 27
  - County Route A27 (California)
  - County Route J27 (California)
  - County Route S27 (California)
- Connecticut Route 27
- Florida State Road 27
- Georgia State Route 27
- Idaho State Highway 27
- Illinois Route 27 (former)
- Iowa Highway 27
- K-27 (Kansas highway)
- Louisiana Highway 27
- Maine State Route 27
- Maryland Route 27
  - Maryland Route 27B
  - Maryland Route 27C
  - Maryland Route 27D
  - Maryland Route 27E
- Massachusetts Route 27
- M-27 (Michigan highway)
- Minnesota State Highway 27
  - County Road 27 (Hennepin County, Minnesota)
  - County Road 27 (Ramsey County, Minnesota)
  - County Road 27 (Scott County, Minnesota)
  - County Road 27 (Washington County, Minnesota)
- Mississippi Highway 27
- Missouri Route 27
  - Missouri Route 27 (1922) (former)
- Nebraska Highway 27
  - Nebraska Spur 27D
  - Nebraska Recreation Road 27B
  - Nebraska Recreation Road 27C
- Nevada State Route 27 (former)
- New Hampshire Route 27
- New Jersey Route 27
  - County Route 27 (Bergen County, New Jersey)
  - County Route 27 (Monmouth County, New Jersey)
  - County Route 27 (Ocean County, New Jersey)
- New Mexico State Road 27
- New York State Route 27
  - County Route 27 (Allegany County, New York)
  - County Route 27 (Cattaraugus County, New York)
  - County Route 27 (Clinton County, New York)
  - County Route 27 (Columbia County, New York)
  - County Route 27 (Dutchess County, New York)
  - County Route 27 (Erie County, New York)
  - County Route 27 (Greene County, New York)
  - County Route 27 (Lewis County, New York)
  - County Route 27 (Livingston County, New York)
    - County Route 27B (Livingston County, New York)
  - County Route 27 (Nassau County, New York)
  - County Route 27 (Ontario County, New York)
  - County Route 27 (Oswego County, New York)
  - County Route 27 (Rensselaer County, New York)
  - County Route 27 (Rockland County, New York)
  - County Route 27 (Schoharie County, New York)
  - County Route 27 (Schuyler County, New York)
  - County Route 27 (St. Lawrence County, New York)
  - County Route 27B (Suffolk County, New York) (former)
  - County Route 27 (Ulster County, New York)
  - County Route 27 (Washington County, New York)
  - County Route 27 (Westchester County, New York)
  - County Route 27 (Wyoming County, New York)
  - County Route 27 (Yates County, New York)
- North Carolina Highway 27
- North Dakota Highway 27
- Ohio State Route 27 (1923-1927) (former)
- Oklahoma State Highway 27
- Oregon Route 27
- Pennsylvania Route 27
- South Carolina Highway 27
- South Dakota Highway 27
- Tennessee State Route 27
- Texas State Highway 27
  - Farm to Market Road 27
  - Texas Park Road 27
- Utah State Route 27
- Virginia State Route 27
  - Virginia State Route 27 (1918-1933) (former)
  - Virginia State Route 27 (1940–1953) (former)
- Washington State Route 27
- West Virginia Route 27
- Wisconsin Highway 27

Territories

- Guam Highway 27
- Puerto Rico Highway 27

== See also ==
- List of highways numbered 27A

Preceded by 26	Lists of highways 27	Succeeded by 28
