= Guam Highway 2 =

Highway in Guam

Guam Highway 2
- GH-2 highlighted in red

Route information
- Maintained by Guam Department of Public Works

Major junctions
- South end: GH-4 in Umatac
- GH-12 in Agat
- North end: GH-2A in Santa Rita/Naval Base Guam Gate 2

Location
- Country: United States
- Territory: Guam

Highway system
- Guam Highways
← GH-1	→ GH-3

Guam Highway 2 is one of the primary automobile routes in the United States territory of Guam.

== Route description ==
The route runs in a south to north direction, from the Magellan Monument in the southern community of Umatac in a general northward direction to the community of Santa Rita, where it meets Highway 2A (which connects to Guam Highway 1 Marine Corps Drive) and Gate 2 of Naval Base Guam.

== Major intersections ==
Location	mi	km	Destinations	Notes
Umatac			GH-4	Southern terminus
Agat			GH-12	Western terminus
Santa Rita			GH-2A	Northern terminus
1.000 mi = 1.609 km; 1.000 km = 0.621 mi

== Suffixed route ==
Guam Highway 2A
- Location: Santa Rita, Guam

Guam Highway 2A (GH-2A) connects GH-2 to GH-1 in Santa Rita, junctioning with GH-5 along the way.
