= Guam Highway 4 =

Highway in Guam

Guam Highway 4
- GH-4 highlighted in red

Route information
- Maintained by Guam Department of Public Works

Major junctions
- West end: GH-2 in Umatac
- GH-4A in Talofofo GH-17 in Yona; GH-10 in Chalan Pago-Ordot GH-15 in Chalan Pago-Ordot
- East end: GH-1 in Hagåtña

Location
- Country: United States
- Territory: Guam

Highway system
- Guam Highways
← GH-3	→ GH-5

Guam Highway 4 (GH-4) is one of the primary automobile highways in the United States territory of Guam.

== Route description ==
GH-4 is the major highway along the southeastern coast of Guam, comprising the majority of a loop around the southern half of the island (the rest is taken up by GH-1, GH-2A, and GH-2). The highway begins at the south end of GH-2 at the Magellan Monument in Umatac (the road officially changes designations at the crossing of the Umatac River). The road then begins its counterclockwise journey around the southern half of the island, first going south to the southernmost tip of the island at Merizo and then proceeding along the coast, first eastward to Inarajan and then north to Talofofo and Yona, where it meets GH-17 (Cross Island Road). From there, it turns northwest as it passes through Chalan Pago-Ordot (junctioning with GH-10 and GH-15 to points east) and Sinajana before finally reaching its eastern terminus in Hagåtña, junctioning with GH-1 (Marine Corps Drive) at Chief Quipuha Park.

== Major intersections ==
Location	mi	km	Destinations	Notes
Umatac			GH-2	Western terminus
Talofofo			GH-4A	
Yona			GH-17	
Chalan Pago-Ordot			GH-10	
Chalan Pago-Ordot			GH-15	
Hagåtña			GH-1	Eastern terminus
1.000 mi = 1.609 km; 1.000 km = 0.621 mi

== Suffixed route ==
Guam Highway 4A
- Location: Talofofo, Guam

Guam Highway 4A (GH-4A) connects GH-4 to GH-17 in Talofofo.
