= Micronesia Mall =

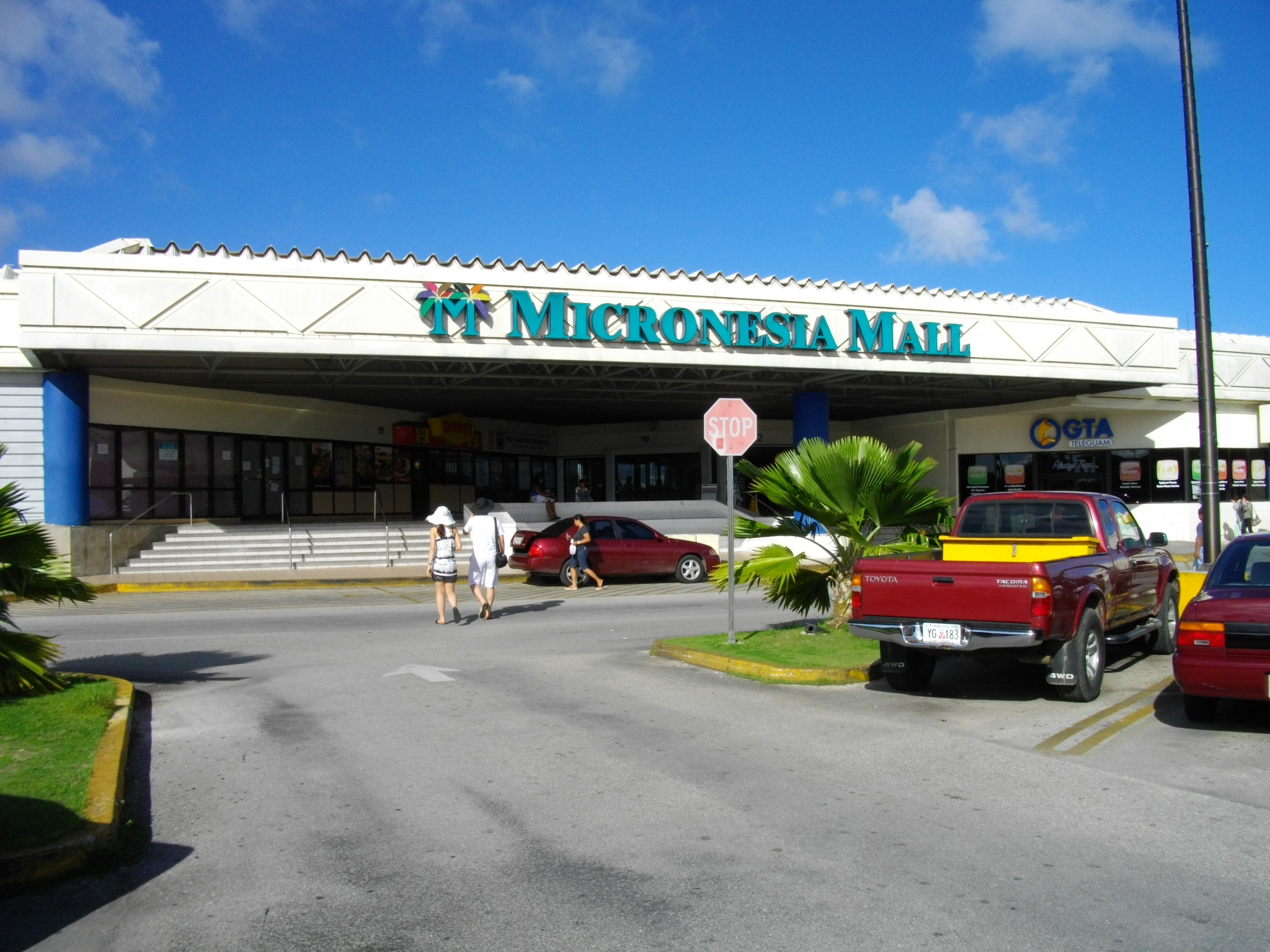
- Location: Dededo, Guam
- Coordinates: 13°31′10.06″N 144°49′2.79″E
- Address: 1088 West Marine Corps Drive
- Opened: August 8, 1988
- Owner: Goodwind Corporation
- Num. of stores: 102 (as of March 2021)
- Num. of anchor tenants: 4
- Floor area: 700,000 sq ft (65,000 m^{2})
- Floors: 2
- Parking: 7 levels of garage parking and 1000 ground level parking spaces
- Website: micronesiamall.com

Micronesia Mall is a shopping mall in Dededo, Guam. Located at the intersection of Guam highways 1 and 16, it is the largest shopping center in the United States territory of Guam with over 100 stores and restaurants.

The four anchor stores are Ross Dress for Less, two 149,377 sq ft (13,877.6 m^{2}) Macy's stores, which are the only Macy's west of Hawaii, and a 24-hour Payless Supermarket. The mall is also home to stores such as Gap, Guess, Levi's, and Foot Locker. The mall is also home to a 24-restaurant food court and a 12-screen movie theater featuring all stadium 3D/digital technology.

Other retail chains include ABC Store, Vitamin World, GNC, Bench, GTA, and Docomo Pacific. Toys "R" Us' only location in Guam was in this mall up until the 2018 bankruptcy, when the store closed on June 27, with no prior announcement or liquidation sale.

Fast food, restaurant and snack chains include Burger King, Panda Express, Cold Stone Creamery, Häagen-Dazs, Denny's, Great American Cookies, KFC, Pretzelmaker, Raising Cane's, Sbarro, Subway, Taco Bell, Tutti Frutti, Chatime, Coffee Beanery, Honolulu Cookie Company, Cinnabon, Pepper Lunch, Robeks, as well as Jollibee and Winchell's Donuts on the outskirts of the mall.

== History ==
The Micronesia Mall opened on August 8, 1988, a date chosen by its owners for luck: The number "8" is considered a lucky number by Chinese and other Asian cultures. Its first store was a Sterling Department Store, which opened ahead of the rest of the mall. The store was later purchased by Liberty House in 1994, which was replaced by Macy's in 2001. A major expansion was completed in 1998, doubling the mall's size.
