= Guam Highway 11 =

Highway in Guam

Guam Highway 11
- GH-11 highlighted in red

Route information
- Maintained by Guam Department of Public Works

Major junctions
- East end: GH-1 in Piti
- West end: Glass Breakwater access road

Location
- Country: United States
- Territory: Guam

Highway system
- Guam Highways
← GH-10A	→ GH-12

Guam Highway 11 (GH-11) is one of the primary automobile highways in the United States territory of Guam.

== Route description ==
This spur route from GH-1 runs westward along Cabras Island, a narrow peninsula which forms the northern edge of Apra Harbor. This area houses Guam's commercial port facilities, making GH-11 an important transport route. The Port Authority of Guam is located on this highway within the port facilities. The road's designation ends at the control gate to the access road leading out to the man-made Glass Breakwater.

== Major intersections ==
The entire highway is in Piti, Guam. The entire route is in Piti.

mi	km	Destinations	Notes
		GH-1	Eastern terminus
		Glass Breakwater access road	Western terminus
1.000 mi = 1.609 km; 1.000 km = 0.621 mi
