= Guam Highway 16 =

Highway in Guam

Guam Highway 16
- Army Drive
- GH-16 highlighted in red

Route information
- Maintained by Guam Department of Public Works

Major junctions
- South end: GH-8 in Barrigada
- GH-10A / GH-25 in Barrigada–Dededo GH-27 in Dededo GH-27A in Dededo
- North end: GH-1 in Tamuning/Dededo

Location
- Country: United States
- Territory: Guam

Highway system
- Guam Highways
← GH-15	→ GH-17

Guam Highway 16 (GH-16), also named Army Drive, is one of the primary automobile highways in the United States territory of Guam .

== Route description ==
GH-16 serves as one of the chief routes of the island's central plateau, splitting off from GH-8 in Barrigada and turning northeast, skirting around the eastern reaches of Tiyan (formerly Naval Air Station Guam) and the neighboring Antonio B. Won Pat International Airport, eventually reaching an interchange. This single-point urban interchange is with two routes: GH-10A (which heads west back towards the airport's terminals) and GH-25, which heads east towards Dededo. From the interchange, GH-16 hugs the edge of the plateau, overlooking the Harmon Industrial Park, before turning north-northeast, descending, and forming the border between the communities of Tamuning (on the west) and Dededo (on the east). GH-16 intersects GH-27 and GH-27A before reaching Micronesia Mall and ending at a T-intersection with GH-1, alongside the mall and still on the Tamuning/Dededo border.

== Major intersections ==
Location	mi	km	Destinations	Notes
Barrigada			GH-8	Southern terminus
Barrigada			GH-10A; GH-25	Guam's sole interchange
Dededo			GH-27	
Dededo			GH-27A	
Tamuning–Dededo village line			GH-1	Northern terminus
1.000 mi = 1.609 km; 1.000 km = 0.621 mi
