= Guam Highway 18 =

Highway in Guam

Guam Highway 18
- GH-18 highlighted in red

Route information
- Maintained by Guam Department of Public Works
- Length: 2.3 km (1.4 mi)

Major junctions
- East end: GH-1 in Piti
- West end: Dead end at Drydock Island

Location
- Country: United States
- Territory: Guam

Highway system
- Guam Highways
← GH-17	→ GH-26

Guam Highway 18 (GH-18) is one of the primary automobile highways in the United States territory of Guam.

== Route description ==
In spite of its main highway designation, GH-18 is a short spur route, running westward from GH-1 across from the Guam Veterans Cemetery and along onto Drydock Island, a small peninsula located in the middle of Apra Harbor and just to the south of Cabras Island. This peninsula forms the northern edge of Sasa Bay; its south edge is formed by Polaris Point, a Naval site. The waters of Sasa Bay are a marine preserve, making the peninsula a tourist attraction. The peninsula is home to the Marianas Yacht Club, several public beaches, and an Atlantis tourist submarine. Route 18 ends at a dead-end at the west edge of the peninsula.

== Major intersections ==
The entire route is in Piti.

mi	km	Destinations	Notes
		GH-1	Eastern terminus
		Drydock Island	Western terminus
1.000 mi = 1.609 km; 1.000 km = 0.621 mi
