= Guam Highway 27 =

Highway in Guam

Guam Highway 27
- GH-27 highlighted in red

Route information
- Maintained by Guam Department of Public Works
- Length: 1.1 mi (1.8 km)

Major junctions
- West end: GH-16 in Tamuning
- East end: GH-1 in Dededo

Location
- Country: United States
- Territory: Guam

Highway system
- Guam Highways
← GH-26	→ GH-28

Guam Highway 27 (GH-27), also known as Hamburger Highway or Harmon Loop Road, is a short highway in the United States territory of Guam. The highway runs in an east–west direction from a junction with GH-16 to a junction with GH-1, and is located almost entirely in the southern region of the city of Dededo. The highway gets its name from the fact that it provides access to a large McDonald's restaurant located at the intersection with GH-16.

== Route description ==
GH 27 begins at an intersection with GH 16 (Army Drive). The highway begins as a six lane, paved highway, and proceeds east, passing a few small businesses, including a small hotel. The highway continues past several small businesses and the Juan Mendiola Guerrero Elementary School. The highway continues past a few large neighborhoods, before intersecting GH 1, and passing a few small businesses in the process. The highway terminates at this intersection.

== Major junctions ==
Location	mi	km	Destinations	Notes
Tamuning	0.0	0.0	GH-16	
Dededo	1.1	1.8	GH-1	
1.000 mi = 1.609 km; 1.000 km = 0.621 mi

== Related route ==
Guam Highway 27A
- Location: Dededo
- Length: 2.00 mi (3.22 km)

Guam Highway 27A (GH-27A) is a 2.00-mile-long (3.22 km) territorial highway in the U.S. overseas territory of Guam. It stretches from GH-28 at its eastern terminus to GH-16 at its western terminus, intersecting with GH-1 as it does so.
