= ABC Stores =

Chain of convenience stores based in Honolulu

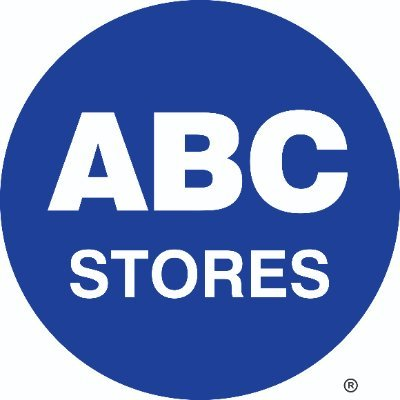
- Formerly: Mister K
- Type: Private
- Founded: 1964
- Founder: Sidney Kosasa
- Headquarters: Honolulu, Hawaii, U.S.
- Key people: Paul Kosasa (President & CEO)
- Services: Convenience store
- Parent: MNS Ltd.
- Subsidiaries: Island Gourmet Markets; Island Country Markets; Island Deli; Honolua Store; Dukes Lane Market & Eatery
- Website: abcstores.com

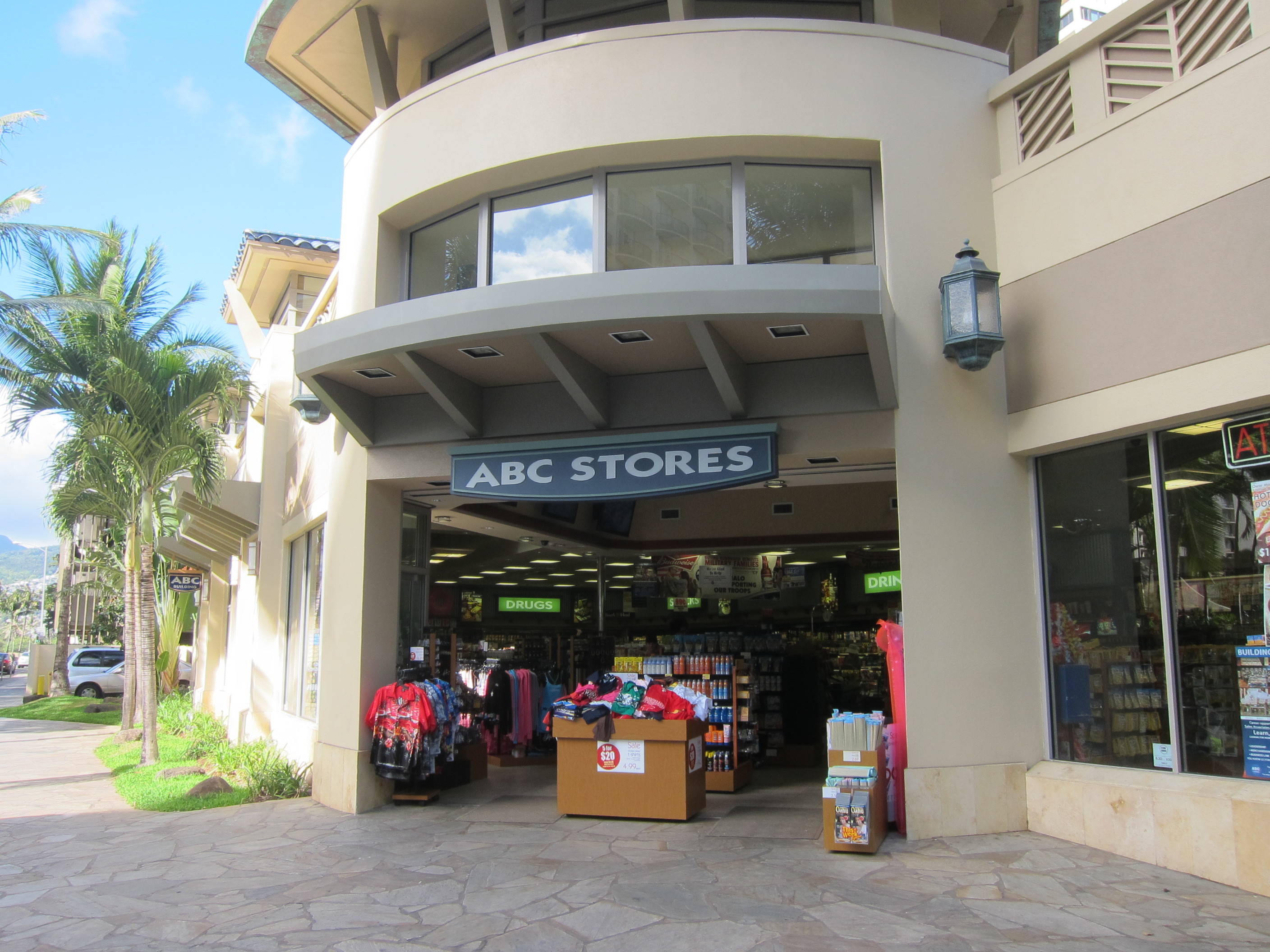
An ABC Store in Honolulu, Hawaii in 2012

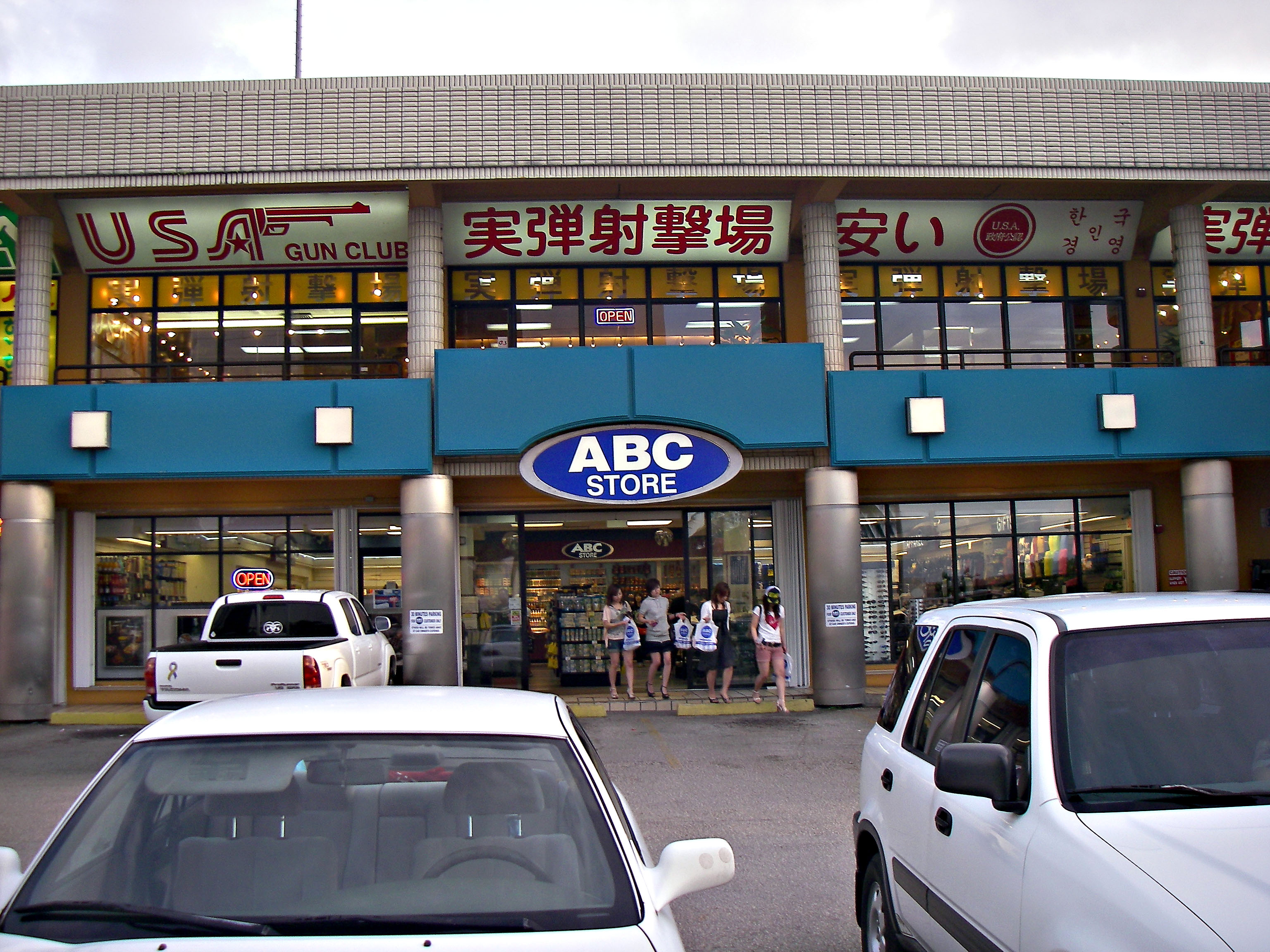
An ABC Store in Tamuning, Guam in 2009

ABC Stores is a chain of convenience stores based in Honolulu. The chain operates 73 stores, 58 of which are located in the state of Hawaii, with the remaining locations in the Mariana Islands (1), Las Vegas (6), and Guam (8). The company now generates more than $230 million in annual sales and employs over 1500 staff, and is described as the 37th largest company in Hawaii.

== Products ==
The stores sell convenience items such as groceries, as well as tourist-oriented products such as Macadamia nuts, sunscreen and sunglasses.

== History ==
The chain was started by a Japanese-American, Sidney Kosasa, who opened his first store in Waikīkī in 1964. The stores were originally named "Mister K." Later, in order to make the store name easier to remember, the name of the stores were changed to "ABC Stores." The last Mister K was changed to ABC in 2009.

The son of a first generation Japanese immigrant, Sidney Kosasa (or rather ‘Mr. K’- known by his ABC Stores ‘Ohana’ or family) was born in Palolo Valley, Hawaii in December 1919. His first experiences in retail began while working in his parents’ grocery store in Palolo. Sidney was a senior at UC Berkeley when the Japanese military bombed Pearl Harbor. He was rounded up along with other Japanese Americans and sent to the internment camp at Tulelake.

In 1949, Mr. and Mrs. K. opened their first pharmacy/convenience store in Kaimuki, Hawaii – known later as Thrifty Drugs. As business grew, his entrepreneurial and business philosophies resulted in the opening of four locations within 10 years. While attending a business convention in Miami Beach, Florida, Mr. K noticed all the tourists near the large hotels and had a vision to build a chain of resort stores in Hawaii. The first ABC Store was opened on Kalakaua Avenue in Waikīkī, Hawaii in 1964.

Mr. Kosasa died on November 17, 2006. His son Paul is the current CEO of ABC.

== Brands ==
=== ABC Stores ===
The company's namesake brand is also its largest sub-brand, having more than 58 locations across the Hawaiian Islands and beyond, with 40 in Waikiki alone. These convenience store style shops carry local Hawaiian products like macadamia nuts, chocolates, and coffee as well as apparel, groceries, and all types of alcoholic products.

=== Island Gourmet Markets ===
Island Gourmet Markets is described by the company as a "lifestyle market and gift shop." These large format stores carries a more expanded assortment of grocery items including fresh produce and meats as well as the traditional products find in standard ABC Stores like apparel, gifts, and snacks. This brand currently has two locations - one in Waikoloa's Queens’ MarketPlace and the other in the Shops at Wailea on the Hawaiian Island of Maui. Similar establishments are also operated by them under another name at the Kapalua Resort on in Maui (the Honolua Store) and in Koloa on Kauaʻi (Sueoka Market).

=== Island Country Markets ===
Island Country Markets are officially described by the company also as a "lifestyle market and gift shop." Country Markets are generally smaller than the large Gourmet Markets but larger than the traditional ABC Store. They have a stronger emphasis on fresh and prepared food than ABC Stores but lack the same level of groceries available at their larger cousin. The brand currently has three locations; one at the Ritz Carlton Residences Waikīkī beach, one at the Ko Olina Resorts on the Island of Oahu, and one in Kapaʻa on the island of Kauai.

=== Dukes Lane Market & Eatery ===
In 2017, the company opened a restaurant and food hall known as the Dukes Lane Eatery in Waikīkī.

=== Restaurants ===
The company also owns and operates a number of restaurants with the most popular being Lineage in Wailea, Basalt in Waikīkī, and Island Deli locations in some of its various retail establishments.
