= Barrigada, Guam =

Coordinates: 13°28′06″N 144°47′56″E

Barrigada Barigåda
- Village
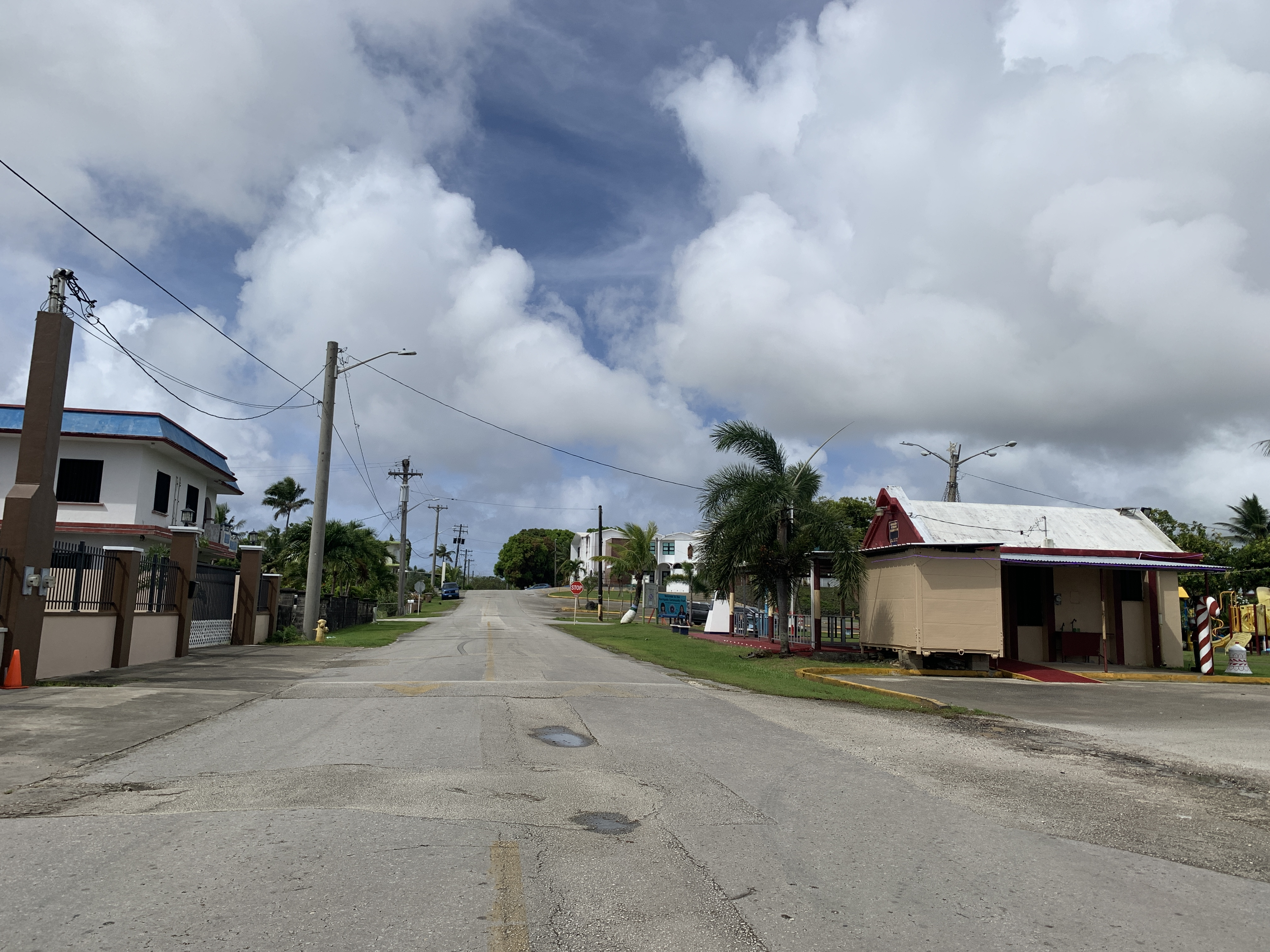
- Looking down San Roque Drive near San Vicente Church

- Location of Barrigada within the Territory of Guam.
- Country: United States
- Territory: Guam

Government
  - Mayor: June U. Blas (D)
  - Vice mayor: Jessie P. Bautista (D)

Population (2020)
  - Total: 7,956
- Time zone: UTC+10 (ChST)
- ZIP Code: 96921

Historical population
Census	Pop.	Note	%±
1960	5,430		—
1970	6,356		17.1%
1980	7,756		22.0%
1990	8,846		14.1%
2000	8,652		−2.2%
2010	8,875		2.6%
2020	7,956		−10.4%

Barrigada (Chamorro: Barigåda) is a village in the United States territory of Guam. A largely residential municipality, its main village is located south of the Antonio B. Won Pat International Airport, near the intersections of Routes 8, 10, and 16. East of the airport is Mount Barrigada, which has an elevation of nearly 200 meters above sea level, and on its western slope is Barrigada Heights, an affluent neighborhood with excellent views overlooking much of the island including hotels along Tumon Bay. The mountain’s central location means it houses most of the island's radio masts and towers; the position and height make it easier for radio signals to reach the entire island.

== History ==
From 2 to 4 August 1944, the United States Marine Corps engaged troops from the Empire of Japan at present-day Barrigada Heights during the battle of Guam, a year before the end of the Second World War. When the Japanese line collapsed, American forces pursued them to the north, winning the battle. In recent years, the three main highways in Barrigada have been renamed in honor of the U.S. Military. Route 8 is designated Purple Heart Memorial Highway; Route 10 is designated Vietnam Veterans Highway; and Route 16 is designated Army Drive.

== Tiyan (former NAS Agana) ==
North of Routes 8 and 16 is the former Naval Air Station Agana, most of which lies within the boundary of Barrigada. When NAS Agana (now Antonio B. Won Pat International Airport; (IATA: GUM, ICAO: PGUM)) was closed in the mid-1990s, the land and buildings were handed over to the Government of Guam, which utilized many former base buildings as government offices; some agencies, such as the Guam Department of Revenue and Taxation, have since moved elsewhere. Most of the original NAS housing facilities have been demolished to make room for airport-related commercial buildings. The original Chamorro-language toponym for the area, Tiyan (/ˈtiːdʒən/, "belly"), has been restored and is in common use.

The closing of NAS Agana resulted in the opening of Central Avenue and Sunset Boulevard on the north side of the runways to the general public. This busy, but yet unnumbered highway offers a shortcut from Barrigada to Tamuning and Tumon, Guam's economic center.

== Demographics ==
The U.S. Census Bureau includes the municipality in the Barrigada, and Barrigada Heights census-designated places.

== Infrastructure and government ==
=== Government of Guam ===
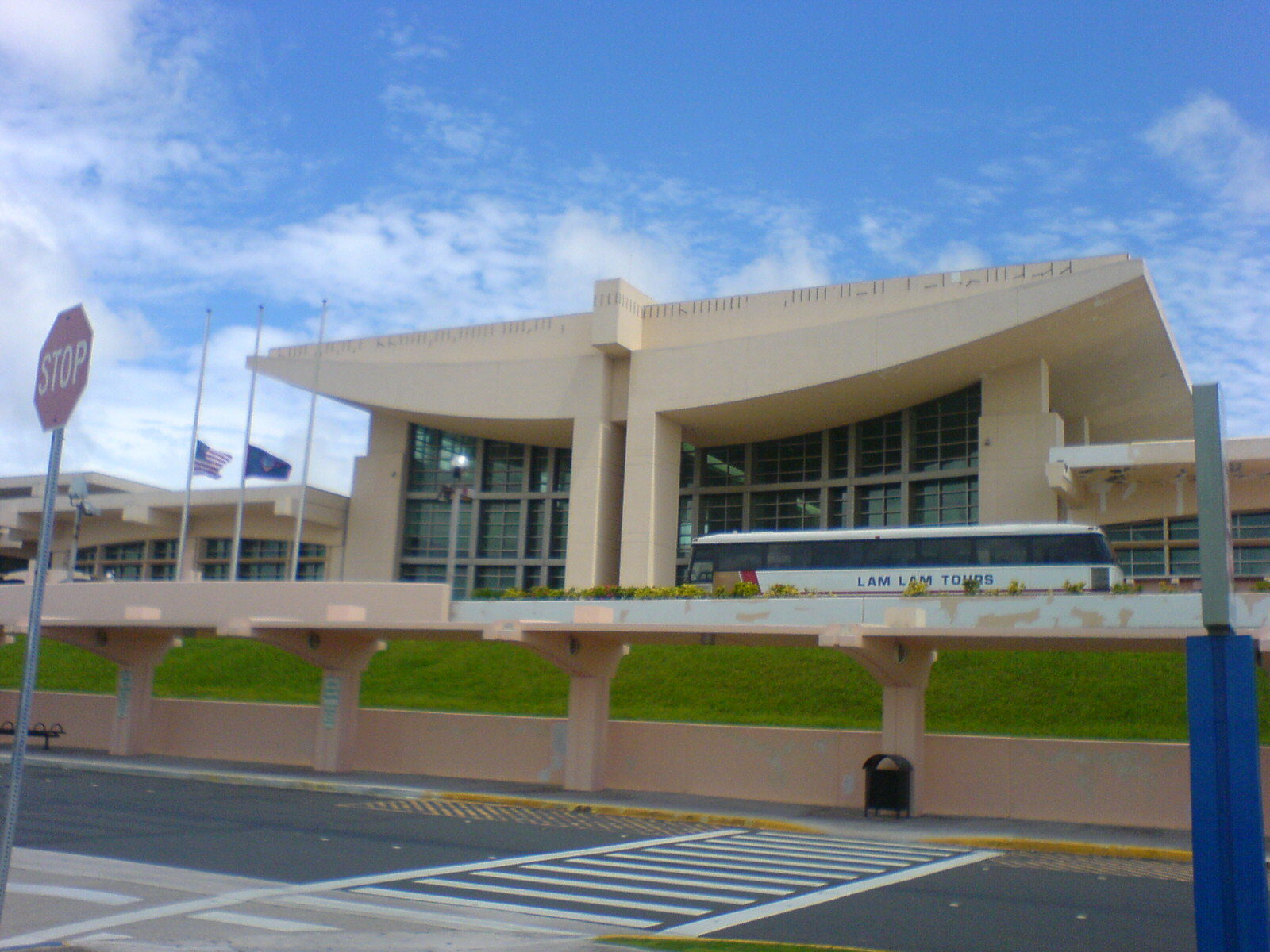
The Antonio B. Won Pat International Airport main passenger terminal, which houses the offices of the Guam International Airport Authority

The offices of the A.B. Won Pat International Airport Authority (GIAA; Chamorro: Aturidat Puetton Batkon Airen Guahan Entenasionat) is located in the main passenger terminal, on the airport property and in Barrigada.

The Guam Environmental Protection Agency has its administrative headquarters and its operation building in Tiyan, as does the Guam Police Department.

=== U.S. federal government ===
The Federal government of the United States owns portions of the land in Barrigada; the Government of Guam stated that it was one of several villages that are "characterized primarily by the large proportion of land owned by the federal government".

The United States Postal Service operates the Barrigada Post Office, which is Guam's main post office and commonly known as "Guam Main Facility" (GMF).

The Federal Aviation Administration operates the Guam Air Route Traffic Control Center at 1775, Admiral Sherman Boulevard in Tiyan. The Guam ARTCC serves as the TRACON and en route control for the airspace within radar range of Guam.

The National Weather Service operates a Weather Forecast Office at 3232, Hueneme Road in Tiyan. This office provides services to Guam, the Commonwealth of the Northern Mariana Islands, and U.S.-affiliated Federated States of Micronesia.

Radio Barrigada, a military communications facility with properties operated by Naval Base Guam and Andersen Air Force Base is located mostly in Barrigada.

== Economy ==
Fly Guam and Freedom Air have their headquarters in Building 17–80 in Tiyan, Barrigada.

== Education ==
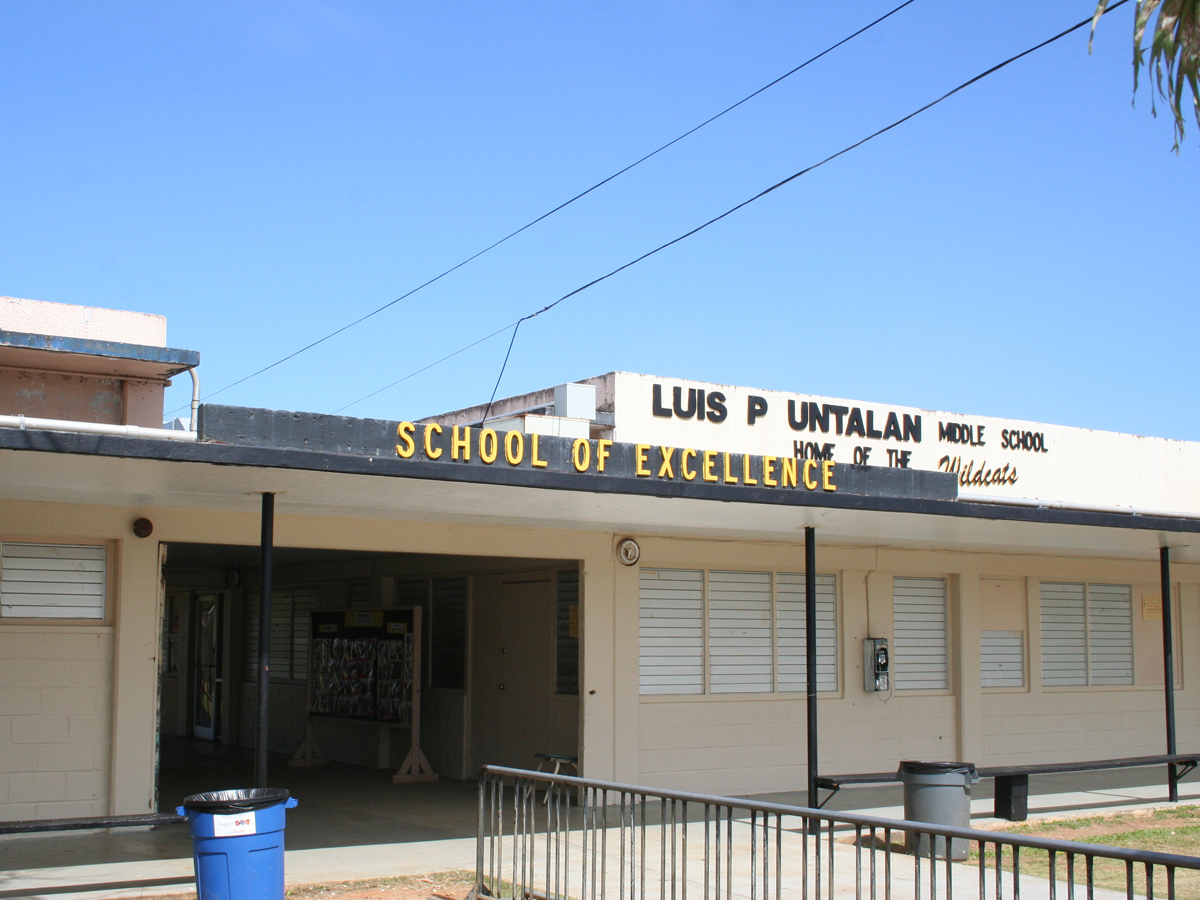
Luis P. Untalan Middle School

=== Primary and secondary schools ===
Guam Public School System serves the island. Two K-5 elementary schools (Baltazar Pangelinan Carbullido Elementary School, Pedro C. Lujan Elementary School) and Luis P. Untalan Middle School are in Barrigada. Tiyan High School is in Barrigada. The school opened in August 2014. Historically George Washington High School in Mangilao has served the village.

In regards to the Department of Defense Education Activity (DoDEA), Barrigada is in the school transportation zone for Andersen Elementary and Andersen Middle School, while Guam High School is the island's sole DoDEA high school.

The Protestant Harvest Christian Academy is located in Barrigada.

=== Public libraries ===
Guam Public Library System operates the Barrigada Library at 177 San Roque Drive.

== Government ==
Mayor of Barrigada
Name	Party	Term begin	Term end
Pedro T. Rosario	Republican	January 1, 1973	January 3, 1977
Raymond S. Laguana	Democratic	January 3, 1977	January 1, 2001
Peter S. Aguon	Republican	January 1, 2001	January 3, 2005
Jessie B. Palican	Democratic	January 3, 2005	January 7, 2013
June U. Blas	Democratic	January 7, 2013	present

Vice-Mayor of Barrigada
Name	Party	Term begin	Term end
Raymond S. Laguana	Democratic	January 1, 1973	January 3, 1977
Bernardo L.G. Mafnas	Republican	January 3, 1977	January 5, 1981
Jose F. Mendiola	Democratic	January 5, 1981	January 7, 1985
Jessie B. Palican	Democratic	January 7, 1985	January 6, 1997
Vicente Leon Guerrero	Republican	January 6, 1997	January 1, 2001
June U. Blas	Democratic	January 1, 2001	January 7, 2013
Jessie P. Bautista	Democratic	January 7, 2013	present

== Gallery ==
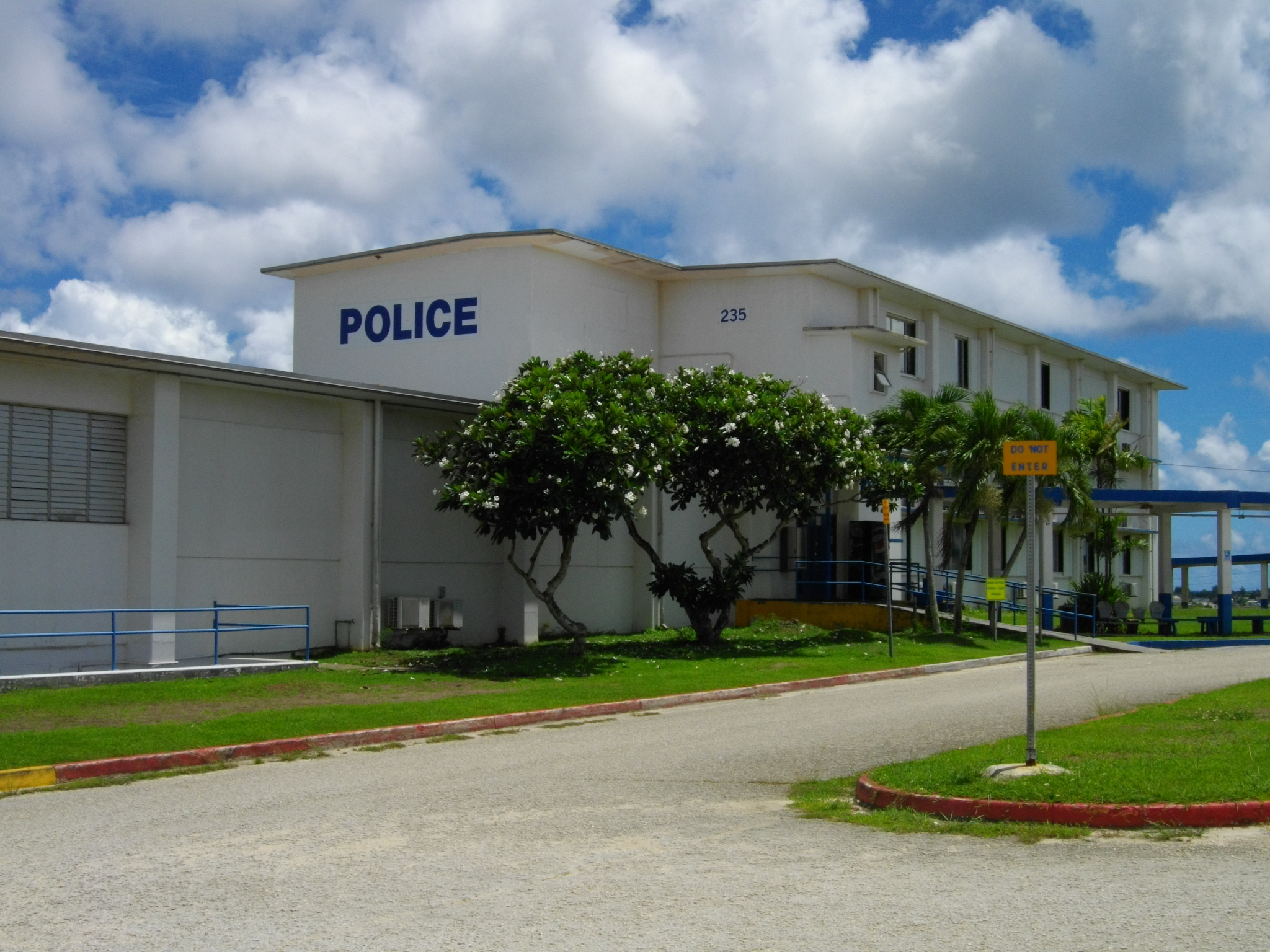
Old Guam Police Department Building in Tiyan, Barrigada (no longer standing)

== See also ==
- Villages of Guam
- Barrigada LORAN-C transmitter
