= Sånta Rita-Sumai, Guam =

Coordinates: 13°23′10″N 144°40′08″E

Sånta Rita-Sumai (formerly Sumay)
- Village
- Location of Santa Rita within the Territory of Guam.
- Country: United States
- Territory: Guam

Government
  - Mayor: Dale Alvarez Jr. (D)

Population (2020)
  - Total: 6,470
- Time zone: UTC+10 (ChST)

Sånta Rita-Sumai, formerly known as Santa Rita and encompassing the former municipality of Sumay, is a village located on the southwest coast of the United States territory of Guam with hills overlooking Apra Harbor. According to the 2020 census it has a population of 6,470, which is up slightly from 6,084 in 2010 but down from 11,857 in 1990. Santa Rita is the newest village in Guam, having been established after the Second World War.

== History ==
Historical population
Census	Pop.	Note	%±
1960	12,126		—
1970	8,109		−33.1%
1980	9,183		13.2%
1990	11,857		29.1%
2000	7,500		−36.7%
2010	6,084		−18.9%
2020	6,470		6.3%

As the rest of the island, Sånta Rita-Sumai was under Spanish rule. Prior to the War, the village of Sumay was on the Orote Peninsula, which forms the southern boundary of Apra Harbor. Once a thriving commercial center, it suffered severe devastation from bombardment by the United States military forces during the Liberation of Guam from the Empire of Japan. The U.S. military assumed control over the ruins of Sumay and built Naval Base Guam on the old village site, while the residents of Sumay were relocated to the hills between their former village and Fena.

They established a new village, naming the settlement after Saint Rita of Cascia. The Fena area, which houses Ordnance Annex and Fena Lake (the main source of fresh water for the island), borders the eastern boundary of Sånta Rita-Sumai.

In August 2021, Gov. Lou Leon Guerrero signed a bill officially changing the name of the village.

== Demographics ==
The U.S. Census Bureau counts it under multiple census-designated places: Santa Rita, and Apra Harbor.

== Education ==
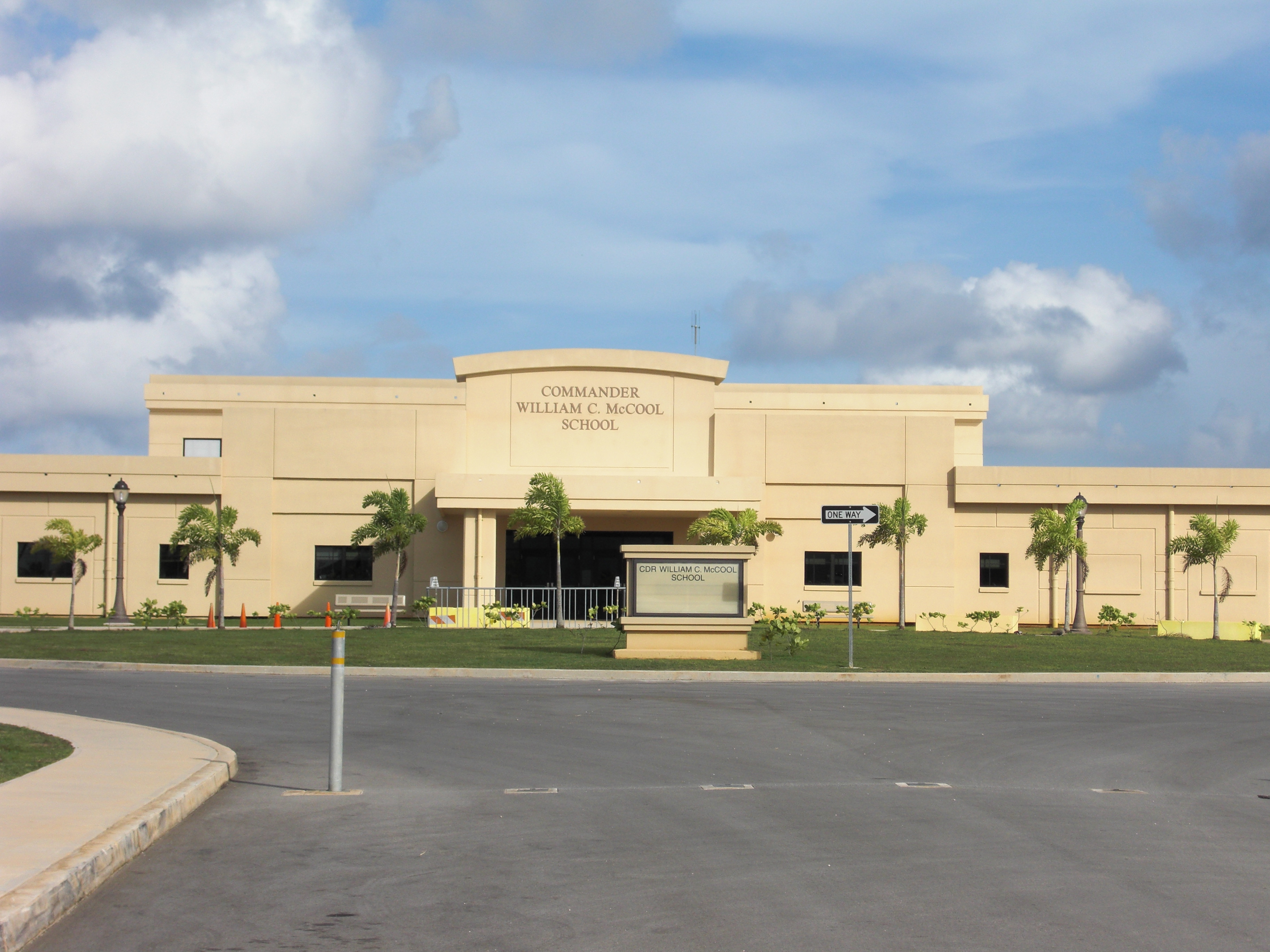
Commander William C. McCool School

The Department of Education serves the public schools in Sånta Rita-Sumai. Sånta Rita-Sumai contains Harry S. Truman Elementary School, Southern High School, and PACE (Program of Alternative Certification for Educators), which was once Santa Rita Elementary School. H.S. Truman Elementary serves Santa Rita residents, while Southern High School serves Santa Rita, Agat and villages allocated by DoE districting. PACE serves students in need throughout the DoE program. Oceanview Middle School in Agat serves middle school residents.

In regards to the Department of Defense Education Activity (DoDEA), Sånta Rita-Sumai is in the school transportation zone for Commander William C. McCool Elementary/Middle School, while Guam High School is the island's sole DoDEA high school. McCool Elementary/Middle School is located on Naval Base Guam, nearly the old Sumay village site.

== Notable Resident ==
- Speaker Antonio Unpingco (1942–2007) - Member of the Guam Legislature

== Government ==
=== Commissioners (Sumay) ===
- Joaquin C. Diego (1927–1930)
- Vicente T. Borja (1930–1931)
- Tomas P. Sablan (1931–1935)
- Gregorio S. Borja (1935–1937)
- Vicente D. Lizama (1937–1939)
- Juan P. Sarmiento (1939–1941)

=== Commissioner (Sånta Rita-Sumai) ===
- Juan N. Perez (1945–1952)
- Joaquin D. Perez (1952–1969)
- Pedro L.G. Roberto (1969–1973)

Mayor of Sånta Rita-Sumai
Name	Party	Term begins	Term end
Juan N. Perez	Democratic	January 1, 1973	January 7, 1985
Pedro L.G. Roberto	Republican	January 7, 1985	January 2, 1989
Gregorio M. Borja	Democratic	January 2, 1989	January 6, 1997
Joseph C. Wesley	Republican	January 6, 1997	January 5, 2009
Dale E. Alvarez	Democratic	January 5, 2009	January 4, 2025
Dale Alvarez Jr.	Democratic	January 6, 2025	present

== See also ==
- Villages of Guam

== References and external links ==
- Rogers, Robert F (1995). Destiny's Landfall: A History of Guam: University of Hawaii Press. ISBN 0-8248-1678-1
