= Antonio B. Won Pat International Airport =

Airport in Tamuning, Guam, United States

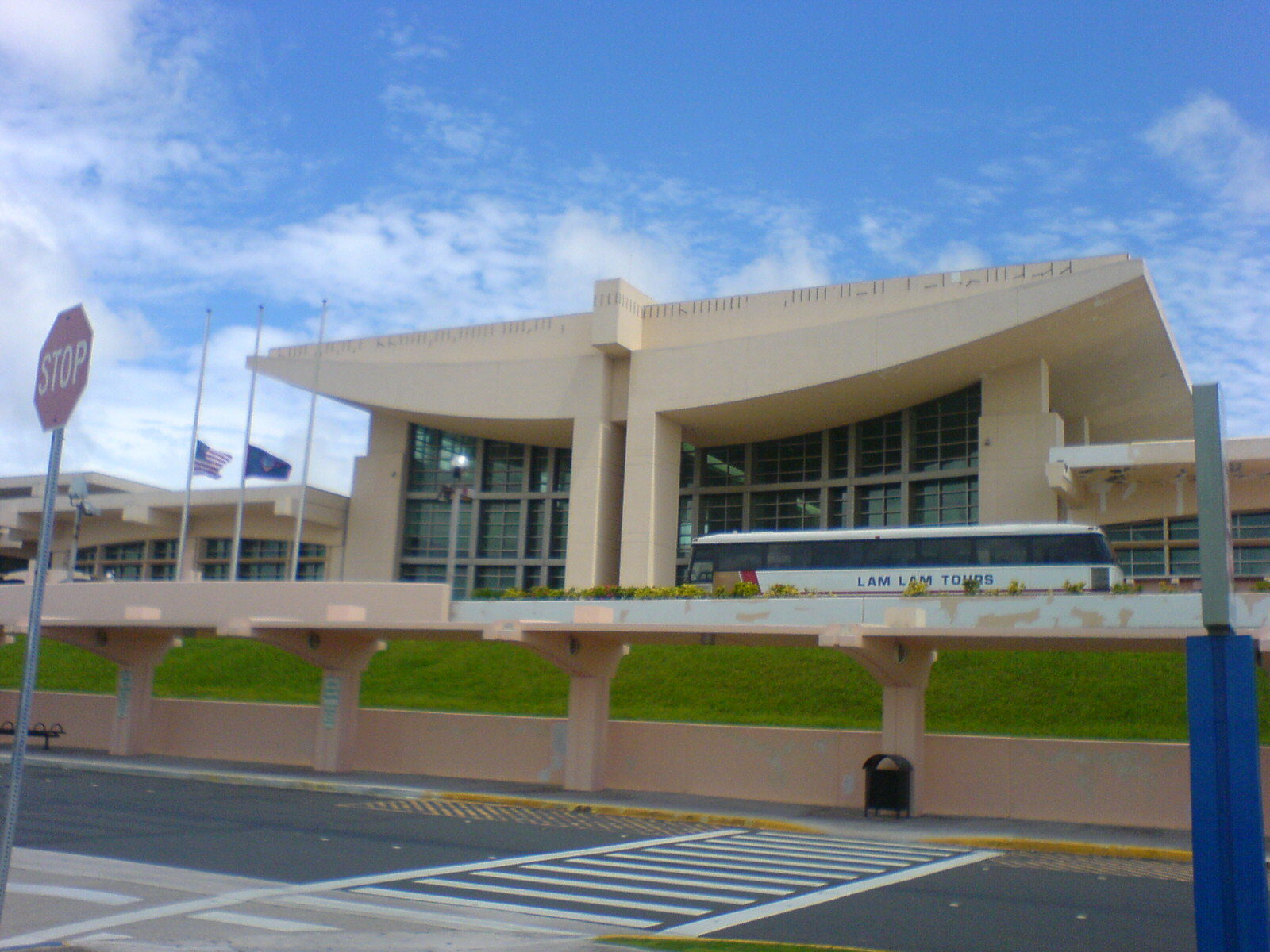
- IATA: GUM; ICAO: PGUM; FAA LID: GUM; WMO: 91212

Summary
- Airport type: Public
- Owner/Operator: A.B. Won Pat International Airport Authority, Guam
- Serves: Guam
- Location: Barrigada and Tamuning, Guam
- Opened: 1943; 83 years ago
- Hub for: Asia Pacific Airlines; United Airlines
- Elevation AMSL: 305 ft (93 m)
- Coordinates: 13°29′06″N 144°47′51″E
- Website: guamairport.com

Maps
- FAA airport diagram
- Interactive map of Antonio B. Won Pat International Airport

Runways
Direction	Length		Surface
Direction	m	ft	Surface
6L/24R	3,662	12,014	Asphalt/concrete
6R/24L	3,052	10,014	Asphalt/concrete

Statistics (FY25 [Oct. 2024–Sep. 2025])
- Flights: 32,780
- Arrivals: 935,980
- Departures: 938,413
- Transit: 122,570
- Source: Federal Aviation Administration, airport website, Bureau of Transportation Statistics

Antonio B. Won Pat International Airport (IATA: GUM, ICAO: PGUM), also known as Guam International Airport, is an international airport serving Guam, located in the municipalities of Tamuning and Barrigada, three miles (4.8 km) east of the capital, Hagåtña (formerly Agana). It is a hub for United Airlines and the primary cargo hub for Asia Pacific Airlines. The airport occupies the site of the former Naval Air Station Agana and is the only international airport in the territory.

The airport is named for Antonio Borja Won Pat, the first delegate from Guam to the United States House of Representatives. It is operated by the A.B. Won Pat International Airport Authority, Guam (GIAA; Chamorro: Aturidat Puetton Batkon Airen Guahan Entenasionat), an agency of the Government of Guam.

== History ==
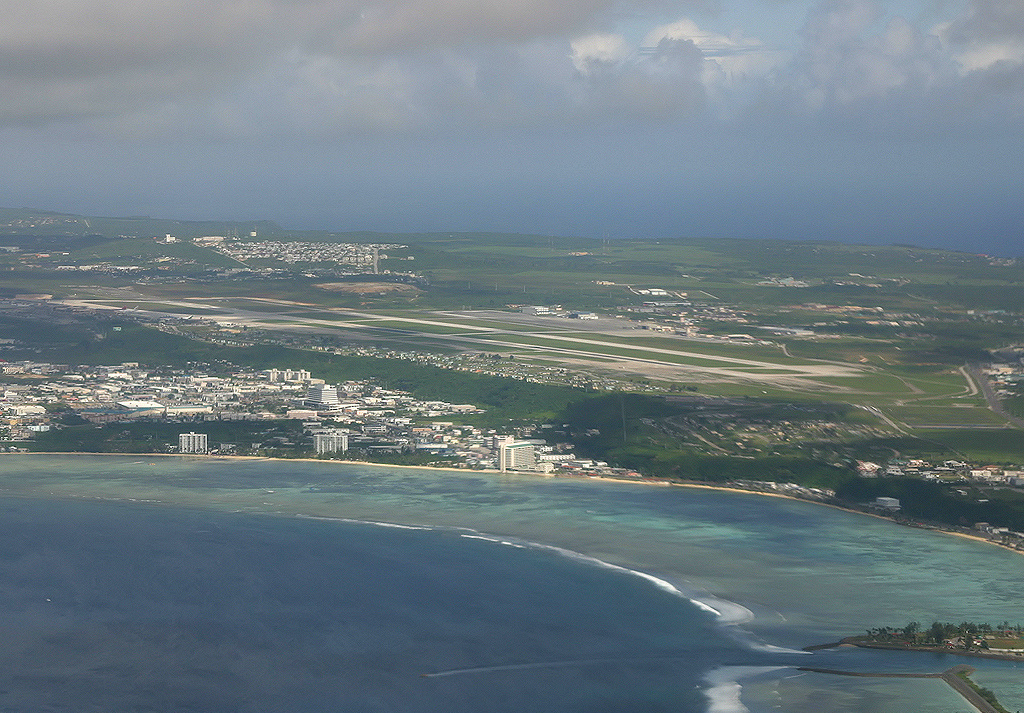
Aerial photograph of the airport

=== Military use ===
The airport was built by the Japanese Navy about 1943, calling the military airfield Guamu Dai Ni (Guam No. 2) as part of their defense of the Marianas. After the island was recaptured by American forces in 1944, it was renamed Agana Airfield, due to the proximity of the town. After being repaired by Seabees of the 5th Construction Brigade in October 1944, the United States Army Air Forces Seventh Air Force used the airfield as a base for the 11th Bombardment Group, which flew B-24 Liberator bombers from the station until being moved to Okinawa in July 1945. With the reassignment of the heavy bombers, the 41st Photographic Reconnaissance Squadron flew long-range reconnaissance aircraft (F-5 Lightnings) from the field until January 1946.

After the war, the USAAF used the airfield for fighter defense of the Marianas (21st Fighter Group), (549th Night Fighter Squadron) until early 1947 and as a transport hub (9th Troop Carrier Squadron). In 1947, the USAAF turned over the airfield to the United States Navy, which consolidated its facilities with those at the closing Harmon Air Force Base in 1949, and operated Naval Air Station Agana until it was closed by the 1993 Base Realignment and Closure Commission.

=== Civilian use ===
Travel to Guam was restricted to military personnel with a security clearance until 1962. During these early years, a single Quonset hut served as Guam's air terminal. The lifting of this travel restriction spurred the development of the airport; its International Air Terminal opened in March 1967 and accommodated its first tour group from Japan two months later. Operations of the terminal were passed onto the Government of Guam's Department of Commerce in 1969. In 1975, the Guam International Airport Authority (GIAA) was created as a separate agency. After NAS Agana was closed in April 1995, GIAA took over the entire airport's operations.

A new passenger terminal building was opened in 1982, and the current, much larger terminal building was opened in phases between 1996 and 1998.

After a period of seasonal charters, the first regular flight to Mainland China from Guam was established in 2014. The United Airlines service to Shanghai Pudong International Airport began on October 29, 2014.

=== Project Hulo' ===
In July 2017, the A.B. Won Pat International Airport Authority launched its Vision Hulo' campaign, which includes around $167 million in capital improvement projects to help boost services and operation for the airport. The projects are set to increase the airport's passenger capacity, which already annually serves 3.55 million departing and transiting passengers. The projects include the relocation of bulky baggage screenings, additional security lanes, the expansion of parking spaces, and more.

A $110 million international arrivals corridor, the largest in the project, is the airport's newest capital improvement project. The third level corridor will finally put the airport compliance with federal regulations by the U.S. Transportation Security Administration in 2005, in response to 9/11, by separating arriving international passengers with departing passenger and allowing the airport to finally remove the semi-permanent barriers and reclaim full use of the concourse.

In the initial months of the COVID-19 pandemic in Guam, flights to and from Guam stopped, except for United Airlines, which maintained daily service to Honolulu and thrice-weekly service to Narita. A year later in April 2021, limited flights were being conducted by United Airlines, Philippine Airlines and Jin Air.

== Customs, immigration, and security inspections ==
Arrival passenger inspection is conducted by the U.S. Customs and Border Protection (immigration only) and Guam Customs and Quarantine Agency. Departure security checks are conducted by the U.S. Transportation Security Administration.

=== Customs ===
Because Guam is outside the United States customs jurisdiction, passengers from all arrival flights go through Guam Customs and Quarantine Agency inspection. Passengers bound for Honolulu, which is currently the only USA destination, go through a normal U.S. Customs and Border Protection customs inspection upon arrival.

=== Immigration ===
The U.S. Customs and Border Protection inspects all arriving passengers from foreign points.

Passengers arriving from the Commonwealth of the Northern Mariana Islands, a separate U.S. immigration jurisdiction with slightly different visa requirements, are pre-inspected there for admissibility to Guam. Nonstop passengers bound for Honolulu are pre-inspected at Guam's boarding gate for admissibility to the United States because of the Guam and Northern Mariana Islands Visa Waiver Program, which allows visa-free entry to Guam for tourists from Australia, Brunei, mainland China, Hong Kong (with a Hong Kong Identity Card), Japan, Malaysia, Nauru, New Zealand, Papua New Guinea, Singapore, South Korea, Taiwan (with a Republic of China passport with a National ID number and a valid Republic of China national identity card), and United Kingdom (with a British Citizen passport or a British National Overseas passport).

For U.S. citizens, passports are not required to enter Guam from the Northern Mariana Islands; other forms of identification proving admissibility are accepted. Passports are required for those transiting a foreign country between the United States and Guam.

Transit passengers, except from Honolulu and the Northern Mariana Islands, are also inspected by the U.S. Customs and Border Protection before being allowed to proceed to their connecting gate. Because all onward flights depart Guam's customs jurisdiction, no baggage claim is necessary.

=== Security ===
The Transportation Security Administration conducts security inspection for departing passengers and all transit passengers.

Transit passengers who arrive from the United States or the Northern Mariana Islands are screened by Transportation Security Administration at their origins, so they are not screened again in Guam.

Guam–Honolulu passengers who have onward connections must go through Transportation Security Administration inspection again in Honolulu because they will have come into contact with their checked baggage during U.S. customs inspection there.

== Facilities ==
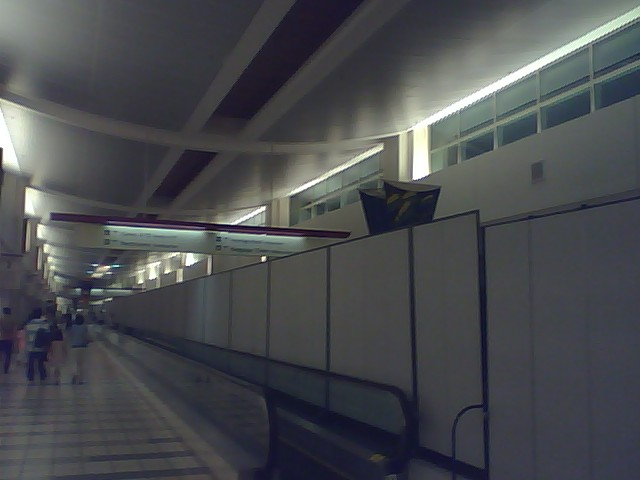
Semi-permanent barriers separating arrival and departure passengers

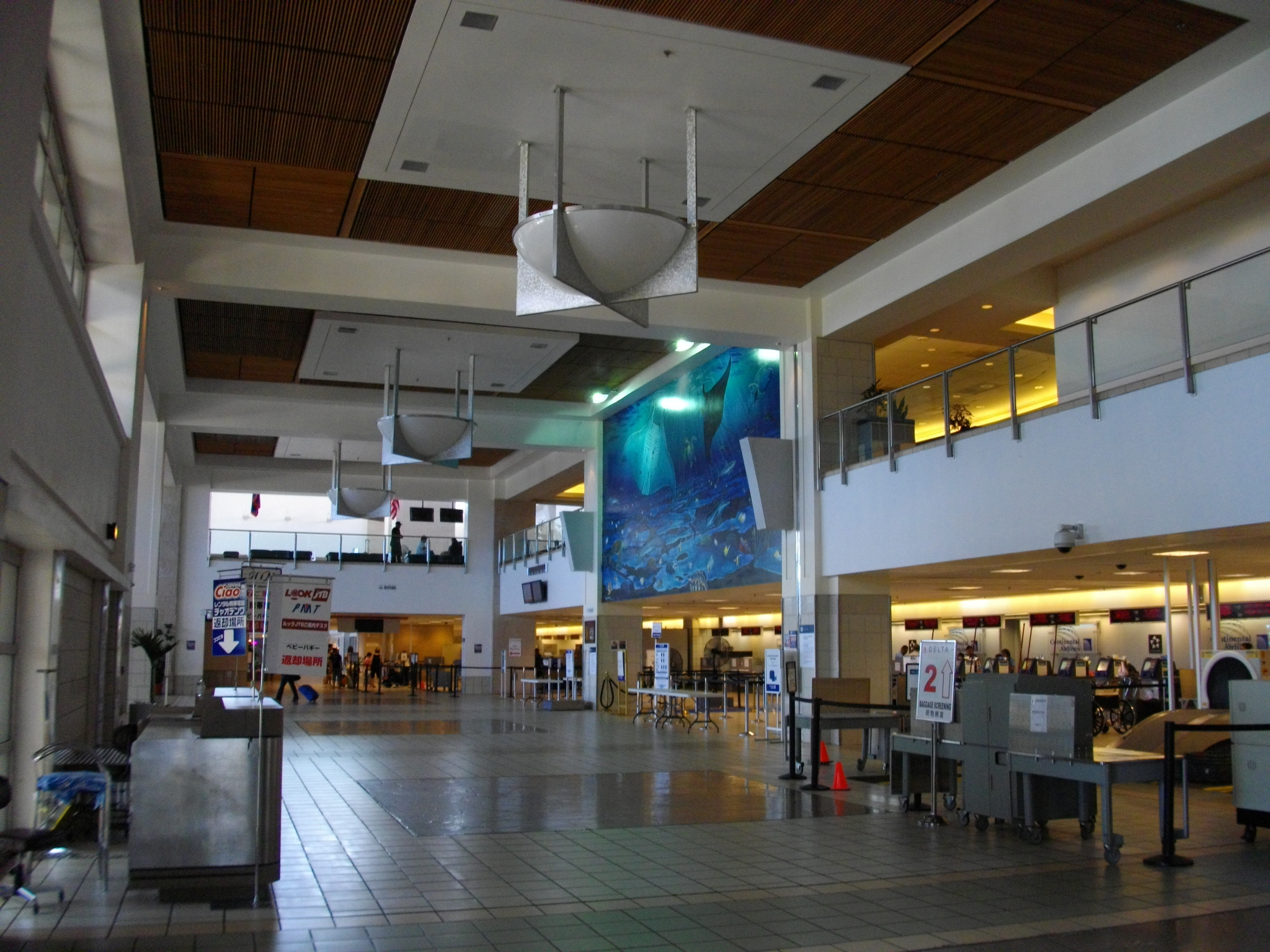
Ticket counters

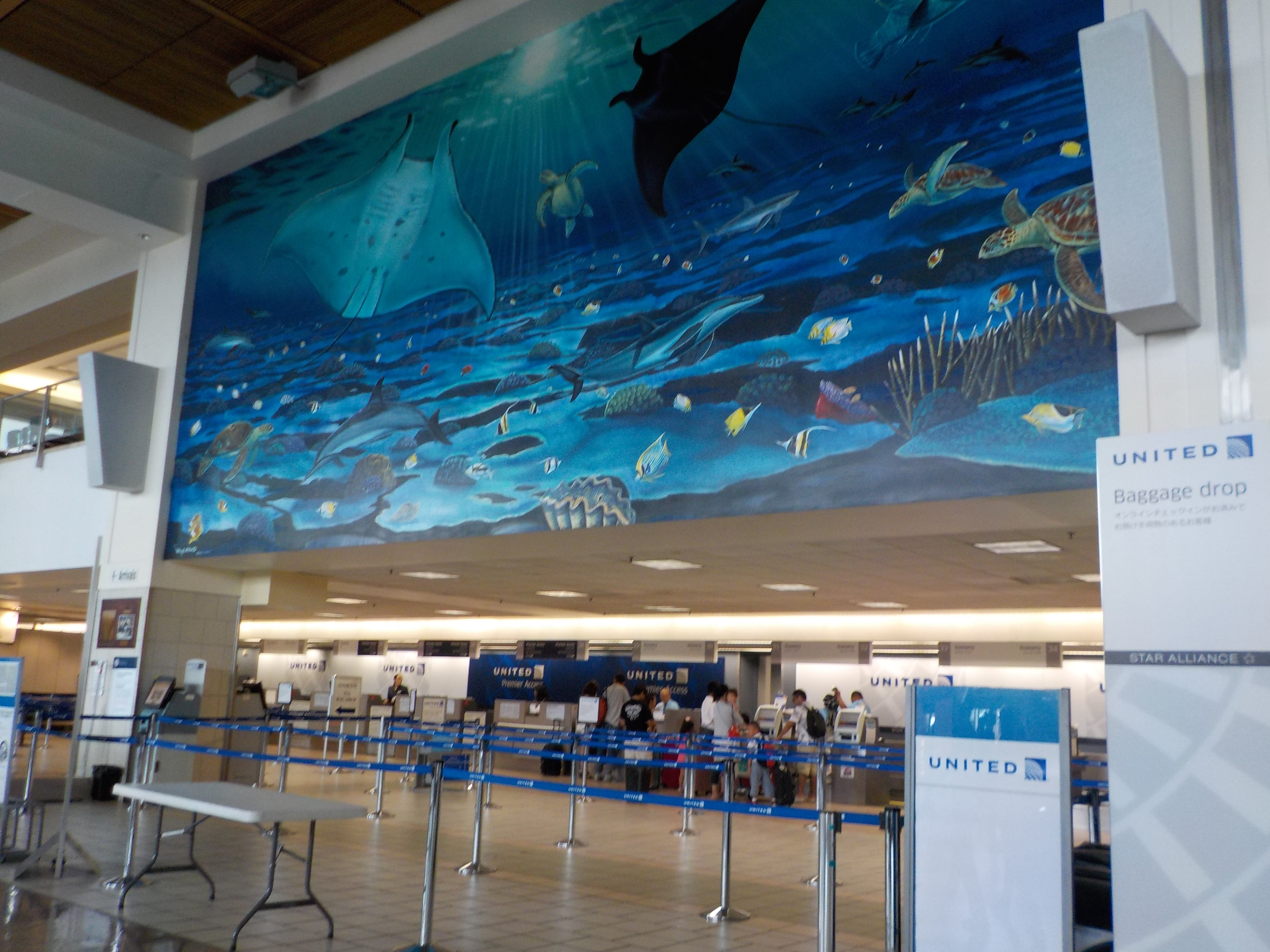
United Airlines check-in

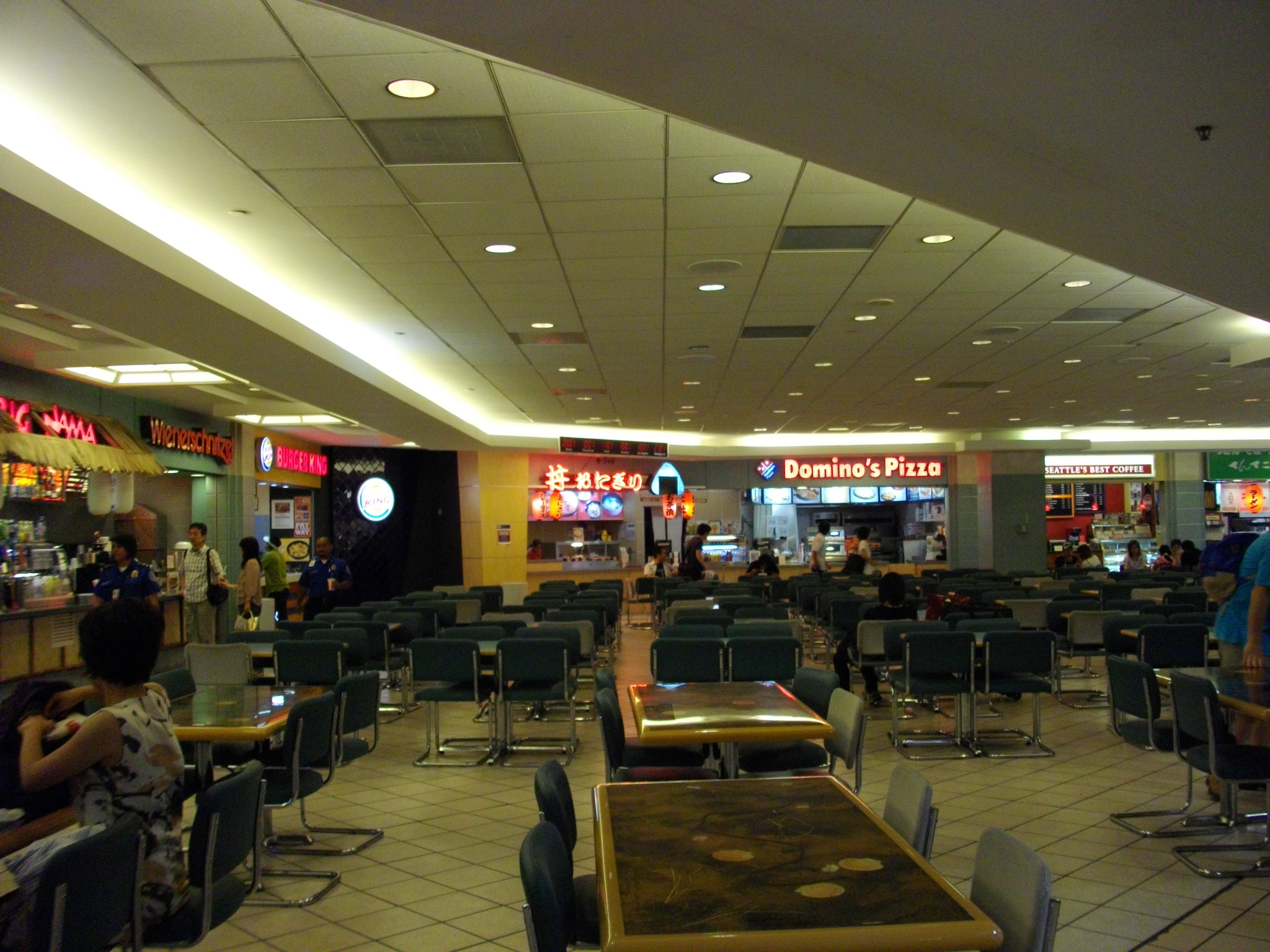
Food court

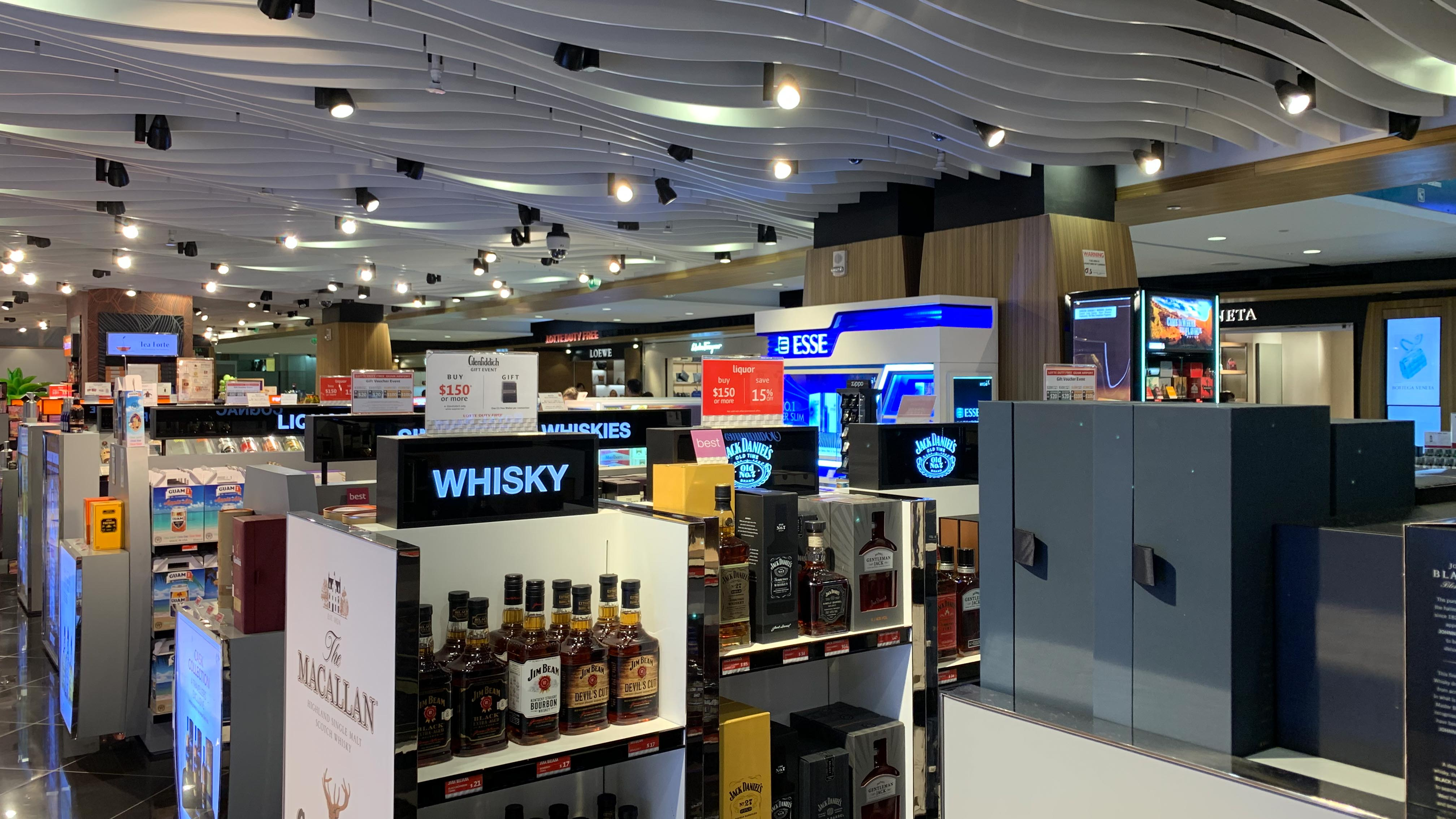
Whisky at the Lotte Duty Free shop

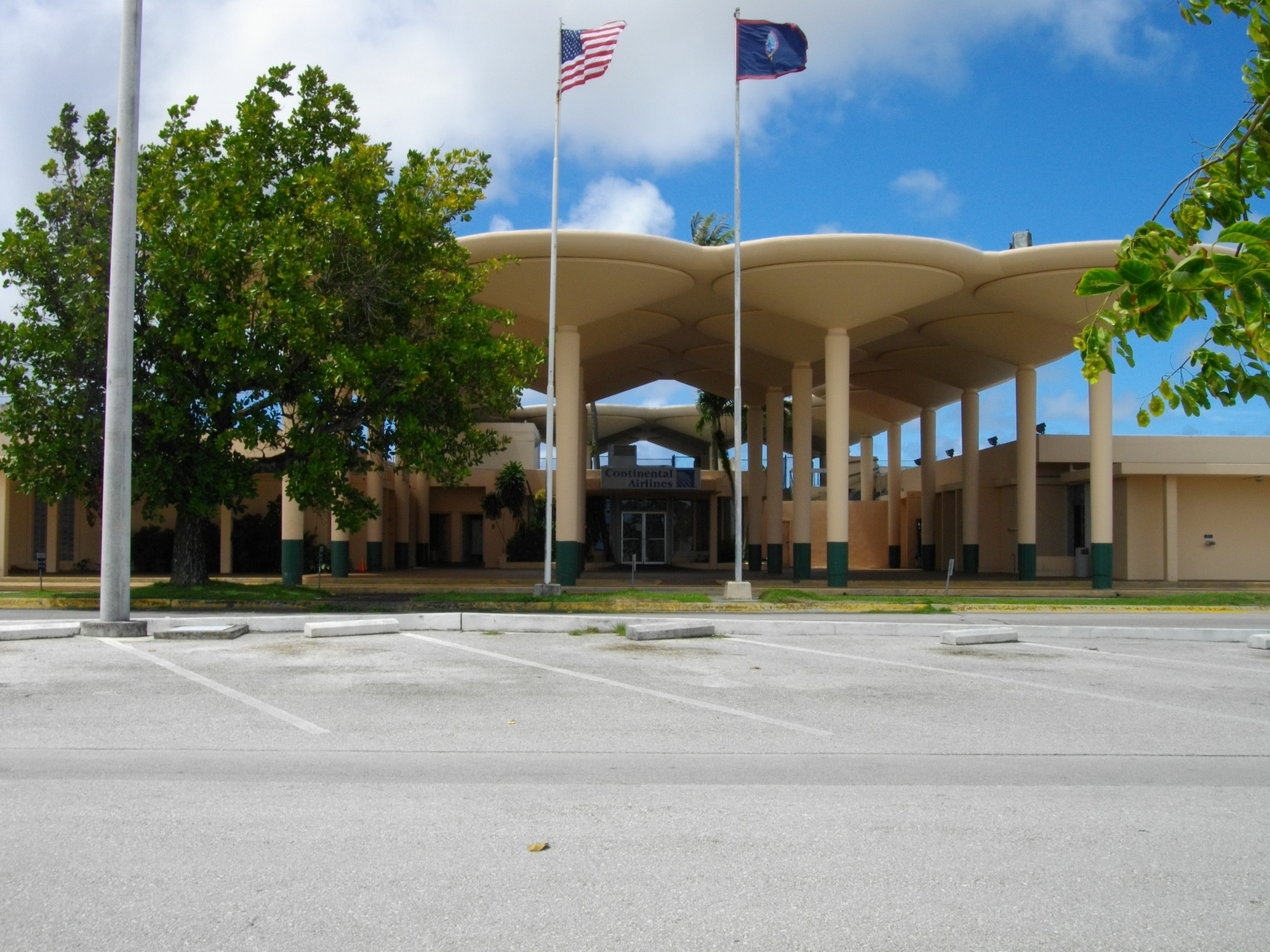
Old terminal building

The airport covers 1,657 acres (6.71 km^{2}) at an elevation of 305 feet (93 m) above sea level. It has two asphalt runways:

- Runway 6L/24R: 12,014 x 150 ft (3,662 x 46 m.), surface: asphalt, ILS/DME equipped, with approved GPS and VOR/DME approaches
- Runway 6R/24L: 10,014 x 150 ft (3,052 x 46 m.), surface: asphalt, ILS/DME equipped, with approved GPS approaches

=== Passenger terminal ===
The current passenger terminal's first phase was completed on September 10, 1996. The 550,000-square-foot (51,000 m^{2}) terminal included a new customs and immigration hall and a 710 space parking lot. In August 1998, the second phase of the current passenger terminal opened. The expansion program that opened the current terminal had a cost of $741 million.

The terminal has three levels. The basement level houses arrival facilities, including customs and baggage claim. The basement also houses the GIAA Airport Police and GIAA Arcade offices and the Hafa Adai Gardens. The apron level (the departure level) houses the ticketing counters. The third floor houses the departure gates, immigration facilities, and GIAA administrative offices. The front of the airport displays stylized latte stone motifs; the latte stone is an icon of modern Chamoru identity.

Since all flights require customs or immigration inspection, the airport's post-security concourse and gate area was not designed to separate arriving and departing passengers. The only normal passenger entrance is through security and the only normal exit is through immigration. Except for the few gates designated for Honolulu arrivals, which route passengers directly to customs, all other gates do not have a separate arrival corridor. Arrival passengers walk directly into the gates' waiting area, and in the past could purchase food or merchandise before entering the immigration hall.

The original design is said to be compliant with security standards at the time of opening. However, after the September 11, 2001, attacks, the U.S. government began to require separation of uninspected arrival passengers. The airport initially used a system of chairs, moving sidewalks, retractable belts and security/police staffing to usher arriving passengers from the gate to the immigration hall without coming into physical contact with departing passengers. In recent years, semi-permanent movable walls separate much of the length of the terminal building into two halves, decreasing the need for human staffing and those lighter objects previously in use.

Two lounges are available to passengers at Guam, the Sagan Bisita Lounge and the United Club.

=== Old terminal building ===
The old terminal served as the corporate headquarters of Continental Micronesia until late 2010. The 220,000-square-foot (20,000 m^{2}), $43 million Commuter Terminal was dedicated on January 19, 1982. At the time of opening, the Guamanian people referred to the terminal as a "white elephant," believing that the terminal was so large that it would never be fully used. After the current terminal building opened, the old terminal building became the Commuter Terminal (serving Freedom Air and Pacific Island Aviation). By 2003, the Guam International Airport Authority moved commuter airlines out of the Commuter Terminal and leased the entire facility to Continental Micronesia.

=== Other facilities ===
- Cargo facilities are located between the main terminal and the commuter terminal.
- Japan Airlines opened a flight crew training center at GUM in October 2013. JAL trains Boeing 737 and Boeing 767 pilots at the airport, including touch-and-go operations during off-peak hours.
- The airport can handle multiple larger aircraft, including the former world's largest aircraft, the Antonov An-225 Mriya.
- United Airlines opened a new City Ticket Office location on the airport grounds in 2017.

== Airlines and destinations ==
=== Passenger ===
Airlines	Destinations
Air Busan	Busan
Air Seoul	Seoul–Incheon
Japan Airlines	Tokyo–Narita
Jin Air	Busan, Seoul–Incheon
Korean Air	Seoul–Incheon
Philippine Airlines	Manila; Seasonal: Cebu (resumes 18 December 2026)
Star Marianas Air	Rota
Starlux Airlines	Charter: Taipei–Taoyuan
Trinity Airways	Osaka–Kansai (resumes 1 December 2026)
United Airlines	Chuuk, Honolulu, Koror, Kosrae, Kwajalein, Majuro, Manila, Nagoya–Centrair, Osaka–Kansai, Pohnpei, Saipan, Taipei–Taoyuan, Tokyo–Haneda, Tokyo–Narita, Yap

=== Cargo ===
Airlines	Destinations
Asia Pacific Airlines	Chuuk, Honolulu, Koror, Kosrae, Kwajalein, Majuro, Pago Pago, Pohnpei, Yap
DHL Aviation	Seoul–Incheon
FedEx Express	Anchorage, Shanghai–Pudong
UPS Airlines	Hong Kong, Honolulu

== Statistics ==
=== Top destinations ===
Busiest domestic routes from GUM (August 2025 – July 2026)
Rank	City	Passengers	Top carriers
1	Honolulu, Hawaii	95,270	United
2	Saipan, Northern Mariana Islands	43,010	Star Marianas, United
3	Rota, Northern Mariana Islands	1,370	Star Marianas

Busiest international routes from GUM (October 2021 – September 2022)
Rank	City	Passengers	Carriers
1	Seoul–Incheon, South Korea	115,680	Jeju Air, Jin Air, Korean Air, T'way Air
2	Manila, Philippines	110,348	Philippine Airlines, United
3	Tokyo–Narita, Japan	99,529	Japan Airlines, United
4	Busan, South Korea	29,435	Jeju Air, Jin Air
5	Koror, Palau	22,755	United

== Accidents and incidents ==
Several fatal accidents have occurred on and near Guam over the years. In total, 367 deaths occurred from six aircraft accidents.

- On August 6, 1997, Korean Air Flight 801, a Boeing 747-300, crashed as it was attempting to land at the airport. Of the 254 people on board, 229 were killed.
- On June 10, 2009, Jetstar Flight 20 flying from Kansai International Airport to Gold Coast Airport experienced a small fire in the cockpit apparently caused by a fault in the heating system. The fire was quickly extinguished by the pilots who subsequently diverted the plane to Guam. All 203 people on board were unharmed in the incident. The Australian Transport Safety Bureau determined the cause of the fire to be an overheat related to the use of a polysulfide sealant in the electrical connections to the windshield.

== See also ==
- Island Hopper scheduled air service from Hawaii to Guam
