= List of schools in Guam =

The following is a list of schools offering courses in Guam.

== Guam Department of Education schools ==
=== Elementary schools ===
- Adacao Elementary (Mangilao)
- Agana Heights Elementary (Agana Heights)
- Astumbo Elementary (Dededo)
- C.L. Taitano Elementary (Sinajana)
- Carbullido Elementary (Barrigada)
- Chief Brodie Elementary (Tumon)
- Daniel L. Perez Elementary (Yigo)
- F.Q. Sanchez Elementary
- Finegayan Elementary (Dededo)
- Harry S. Truman Elementary (Santa Rita)
- Inarajan Elementary (Inarajan)
- J.Q. San Miguel Elementary (Toto)
- Juan M. Guerrero Elementary
- Liguan Elementary School (Dededo)
- Lyndon B. Johnson Elementary
- M.U. Lujan Elementary
- Machananao Elementary (Yigo)
- Marcial Sablan Elementary (Agat)
- Maria A. Ulloa Elementary (Dededo)
- Merizo Elementary (Merizo)
- Ordot/Chalan Pago Elementary (Chalan Pago)
- P.C. Lujan Elementary (Barrigada)
- Price Elementary (Mangilao)
- Talofofo Elementary (Talofofo)
- Tamuning Elementary (Tamuning)
- Upi Elementary (Yigo)
- Wettengel Elementary (Dededo)

=== Middle schools ===
- Agueda Johnston Middle School (Ordot)
- Astumbo Middle School (Dededo)
- F.B. Leon Guerrero Middle School (Yigo)
- Inarajan Middle School (Inarajan)
- Jose Rios Middle School (Piti)
- Luis P. Untalan Middle School (Barrigada)
- Oceanview Middle School (Agat)
- Vicente San Agustin Benavente Middle School (Dededo)

=== High schools ===
- George Washington High School (Mangilao)
- John F. Kennedy High School (Tamuning)
- Okkodo High School (Dededo)
- Simon Sanchez High School (Yigo)
- Southern High School (Santa Rita)
- Tiyan High School (Barrigada)

== Department of Defense Education Activity ==
- Andersen Elementary School
- Andersen Middle School
- Commander William C. McCool Elementary/Middle School (originally Guam South Elementary/Middle School; located in the Apra Heights area of Santa Rita)
- Guam High School

== Private schools ==
- Asumyao Community School (9-12)
- Montessori School of Guam

=== Catholic schools ===
- Academy of Our Lady of Guam (Hagatna)
- Bishop Baumgartner Memorial Catholic School (Sinajana)
- Dominican Catholic School (Yigo)
- Dominican Child Care (Ordot)
- Father Duenas Memorial School (Mangilao)
- Infant of Prague Catholic Nursery & Kindergarten (Mangilao)
- Maria Artero
- Mercy Heights
- Notre Dame High School (Talofofo)
- Saint Anthony Catholic School (Tamuning)
- Saint Francis Catholic School (Yona)
- St. Thomas Aquinas Catholic High School
- Santa Barbara Catholic School (Dededo)

=== Protestant schools ===
- Blessed Seed Christian Academy
- Evangelical Christian Academy
- Family Baptist Church-School (K-12)
- Grace Academy Guam (PK-12)
- Guam Adventist Academy (K-12)
- Guam International Christian Academy
- Harvest Christian Academy (PK-12)
- Pacific Christian Academy, Dededo (K4-12)
- Providence International Christian Academy (K-12)
- St. John's School (PK-12)
- St. Paul Christian School
- Southern Christian Academy (PK2-12)
- Temple Christian School, Chalan Pago (K-12)
- Trinity Christian School (K-12)

=== Chamorro language schools ===
- Chief Gadao Academy of Arts, Science and Chamorro Culture (PK-12)
- Sagan Fina' na' guen Fino' Chamorro

=== Japanese school ===
- Japanese School of Guam (Guam Nihonjin gakko and Hoshuko)

== Charter schools ==
- Guahan Academy Charter School
- iLearn Academy Charter School
- SIFA Learning Academy Charter School
- Career Tech High Academy Charter School
- Mount Carmel Academy Charter School
- Business and Technology Academy Charter School

== Colleges and universities ==
- Guam Community College
- Pacific Islands University
- University of Guam

== See also ==
- List of schools in United States territories
