= Esther Aguigui =

Guam Adjutant General

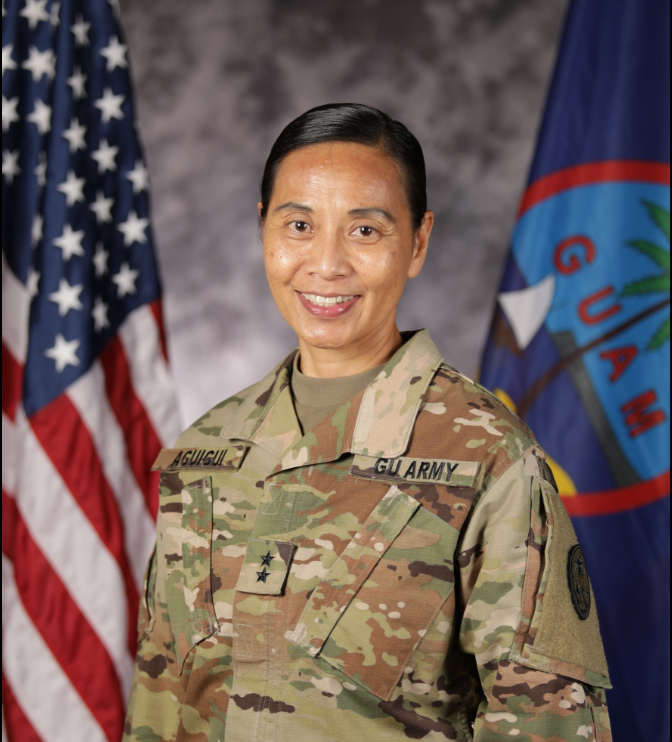
- 2019 official portrait of Major General (GU) Aguigui
- Born: November 13, 1961 (age 64)
- Military career
- Allegiance: United States
- Branch: United States Air Force Reserve; United States Air National Guard; United States Army National Guard
- Service years: 1985–2023
- Rank: Major General (GU); Lieutenant Colonel
- Commands: Guam National Guard; Guam Army National Guard Recruiting and Retention Battalion; Army Element - Guam Joint Force Headquarters
- Conflicts: War in Afghanistan
- Awards: Bronze Star Medal; Meritorious Service Medal (2); Afghanistan Campaign Medal

Esther Aguigui (born 13 November 1961) is an Army National Guard officer who served as the Adjutant General of the Guam National Guard from 2019 to 2023. She was appointed by Governor of Guam Lou Leon Guerrero in 2019. She was the first female officer to lead the Guam National Guard.

As the Adjutant General, she was responsible for leading and coordinating the use of the Guam National Guard in both territorial and federal matters.

== Education ==
Esther Aguigui graduated from George Washington High School in Mangilao, Guam in 1980. She earned a B.A. in Education from the University of Guam in 1989. Aguigui also earned a M.A. in Strategic Studies from the United States Army War College in 2017.

== Military career ==
Esther Aguigui began her military career in 1985, enlisting in the United States Air Force Reserve as an administrative specialist. She served in the Air Force Reserve until 1997 when she transferred to the Guam Air National Guard to become the first female First Sergeant in Guam's history. In 2000 she was direct commissioned as a 2nd Lieutenant in the Guam Army National Guard and became an Adjutant General officer. From 2006 to 2007 Aguigui was deployed to Afghanistan as a counterintelligence officer. She was also deployed to assist with the Hurricane Katrina response in 2006.

From there, Aguigui then became the first female officer to command a battalion level unit in the Guam National Guard when she commanded the Recruiting and Retention Battalion from 2014 to 2016. She then became the first female from the Guam National Guard to attend and graduate the resident course of the U.S. Army War College at Carlisle Barracks, Pennsylvania.

== Adjutant General ==
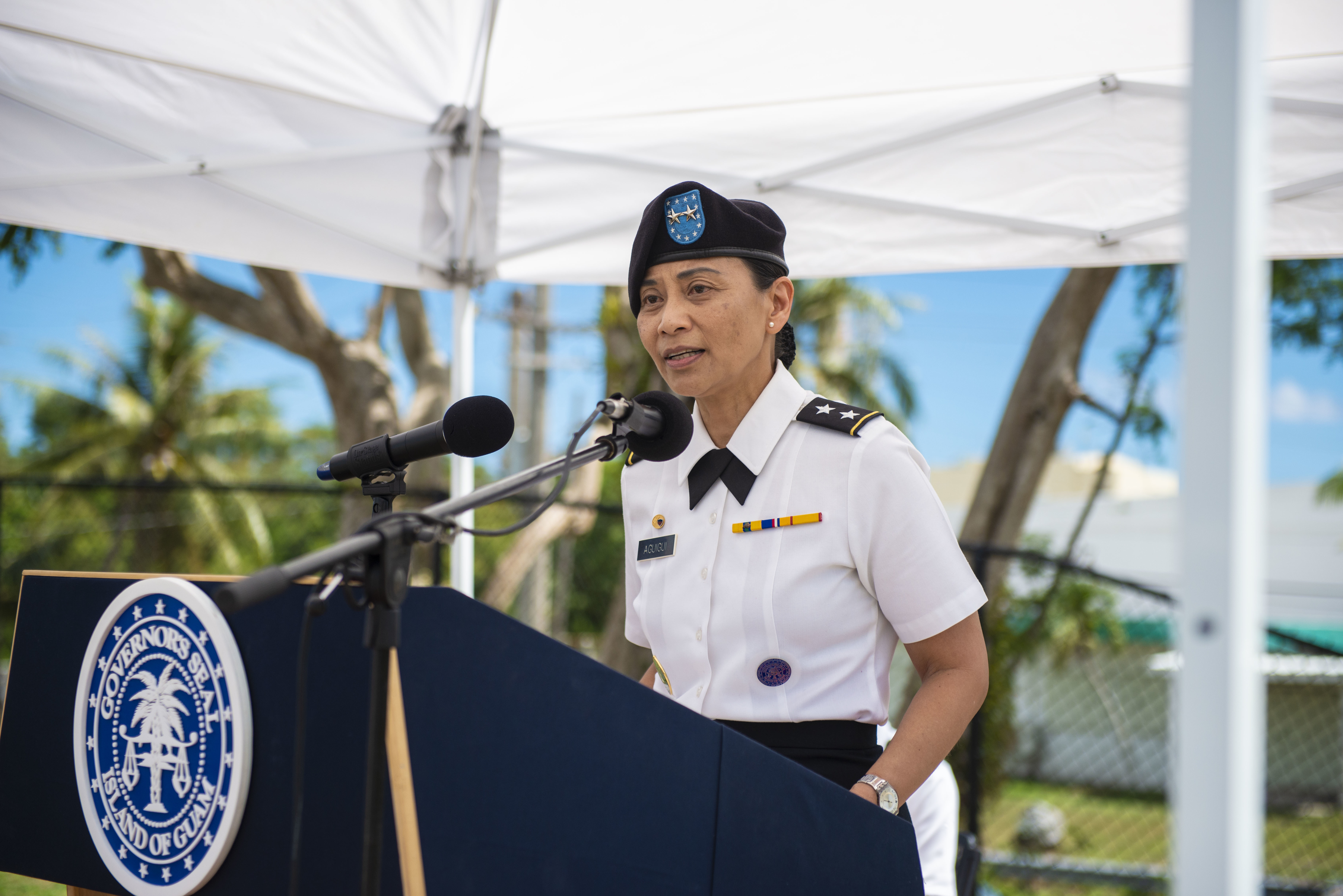
Guam National Guard Adjutant General Major General (GU) Esther Aguigui delivers remarks during a Memorial Day ceremony at the Guam Veterans Cemetery in Piti May 27 (U.S. Navy photo by Alana Chargualaf.)

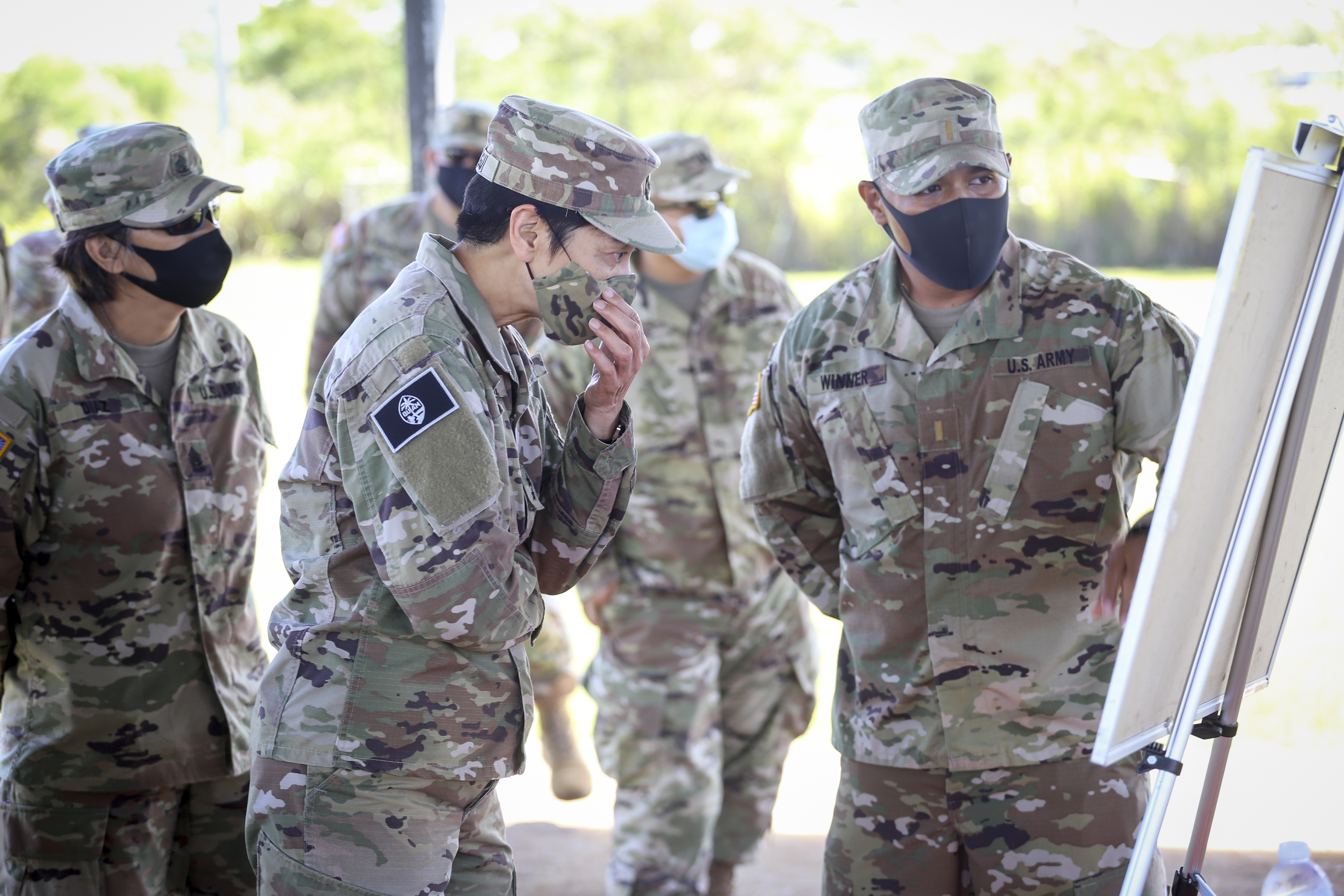
Major General (GU) Esther Aguigui is briefed on an engineering project for the Guam National Guard. Note the Guam flag patch on her shoulder indicating that her rank is recognized in Guam only. (U.S. Army photo by Mark Scott.)

On January 27, 2019, Guam Governor Lou Leon Guerrero nominated Lieutenant Colonel Esther Aguigui to be the next adjutant general of Guam, replacing Brigadier General Roderick R. Leon Guerrero who had been serving as adjutant general since 2015. The appointment was met with controversy as to whether or not Aguigui met the qualifications and rank to take command of the Guam National Guard, and due to a letter of reprimand issued to her by the outgoing Adjutant General. The reprimand was later found to have been inappropriately issued. However her rank caused Brigadier General Diron J. Cruz, the current Assistant Adjutant General to resign to avoid being subordinate to a lower ranking officer. To address this issue, the Guam Government state that Adjutant General is a position and not a rank. While awaiting formal approval by the Guam Legislature, Aguigui was promoted to the state-level rank of colonel on March 15, 2019, by Governor Guerrero. Her federal recognition as a Colonel was pending, due to undisclosed reasons, despite a personal appeal from the Governor of Guam.

Aguigui was unanimously approved by the Guam Legislature as the Adjutant General on April 16, 2019. Governor Guerrero promoted Aguigui to the rank of major general of the Guam Militia on May 5, 2019. Her promotion has proven controversial as Guam law states that "No person shall be a member of the Guam Militia while a federally recognized member of the National Guard, or any active or reserve military organization." and Major General (GU) Aguigui continues to hold the federally recognized rank of Lieutenant Colonel. Aguigui has also received criticism for her staff picks and leadership from members of the Guam National Guard in letters sent to the Governor of Guam.

Aguigui retired from the military in 2023 and was succeeded by Michael Cruz.

== Civilian career ==
From 1985 until 2001, Aguigui worked as a teacher at George Washington High School in Mangilao and Agueda Johnston Middle School in Chalan Pago-Ordot, Guam for the Guam Department of Education.

== Dates of rank ==
Insignia	Rank	Component	Dates
	Second Lieutenant	ARNG	29 July 1999
	First Lieutenant	ARNG	26 July 2001
	Captain	ARNG	16 January 2004
	Major	ARNG	20 August 2008
	Lieutenant Colonel	ARNG	14 April 2014
	Colonel (GU)	GU	15 March 2019
	Major General (GU)	GU	5 May 2019
