= Uruno =

Uruno may refer to:

- Uruno Beach on Guam
- Jun Uruno (born 1979), Japanese football player
- Uruno, a character in the Japanese manga Damekko Dōbutsu
