= 254th Air Base Group =

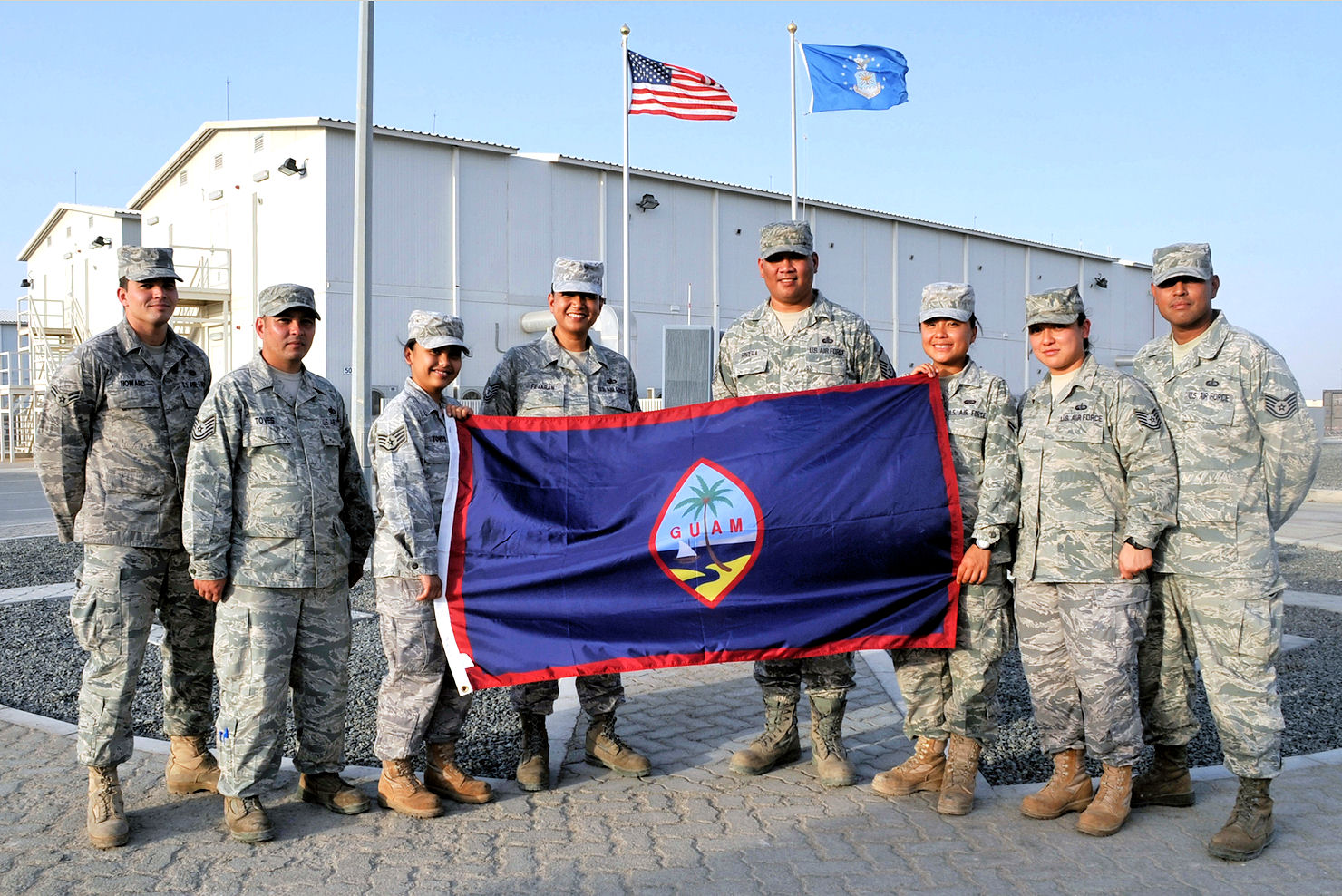
- Airmen of the 254th Air Base Group at Al Dhafra Air Base in the United Arab Emirates.
- Country: United States of America
- Branch: United States Air Force
- Part of: Air National Guard; Guam National Guard
- Garrison/HQ: Andersen Air Force Base, Guam

The 254th Air Base Group is a unit of the Guam Air National Guard, a part of the larger Guam National Guard. The current duties of the 254th Air Base Group are to assist active duty Airmen and Air Force units at Andersen Air Force Base near Yigo, Guam, as well as provide meteorological and civil support to the Governor of Guam and the entire Guam National Guard. If activated to federal service, the unit is gained by the Pacific Air Forces. It is based at Andersen Air Force Base.

== History ==
The 254th Air Base Group was earlier known as the 254th Force Support Squadron. Its original mission included personnel services, education and other force support measures to the Guam National Guard. The 254th Force Support Squadron currently serves as the 254th Air Base Group and has a different mission, now focusing on augmentation of the rest of the Guam National Guard in addition to the Pacific Air Forces on the island of Guam and surrounding islands.

== See also ==
- Guam Army National Guard
