= Guam Department of Education =

Government agency of Guam

Department overview
- Jurisdiction: Guam
- Headquarters: 501 Mariner Avenue, Barrigada, Guam
- Employees: 4,000 (2024)
- Department executive: Judith Won Pat, Superintendent
- Website: gdoe.net

The Guam Department of Education (GDOE), formerly the Guam Public School System, is a school district that serves the United States territory of Guam. The school district can be thought of as analogous to the school districts of other cities and communities in the United States, but in some manners, it can also be thought of as analogous to the state education agencies of other states and territories.

The district is headquartered at the GDOE Headquarters on 500 Mariner Avenue Barrigada, Guam. Its headquarters were formerly at the Manuel F. L. Guerrero Administration Building at 312 Espinall Avenue, Hagåtña.

The Guam Department of Education is a single unified school district consisting of grades kindergarten through 12th grade, with 26 elementary schools, eight middle schools, six high schools and alternative school serve over 30,000 students. In 1998, the U.S. Department of Defense opened schools for children of American military personnel. DODEA schools had an attendance of 2,500 in 2000.

== Guam Board of Education ==
The elected members of the Guam Board of Education is listed below. They are elected at-large in Guam general elections every two years with no term limits. The election is formally nonpartisan, with the party affiliations below reflecting known political history, candidate self-declaration, or state party support. They are listed in alphabetical order.

Name	Start	Party	Next Election
Peter Ada (retiring)	January 4, 2021	Republican	2026
Judi Guthertz, Chair (retiring)	January 6, 2025	Democratic	2026
Maria Gutierrez (retiring)	January 1, 2007	Democratic	2026
Ron McNinch	January 2, 2023	Republican	2026
Mary Okada, Vice Chair (retiring)	January 4, 2021	Republican	2026
Angel Sablan (retiring)	January 2, 2023	Democratic	2026

== School uniforms ==
In the fall of 2008, the district required all schools to have school uniform policies for students. Any new schools opening must have policies in place after one year of opening. Students eighteen years of age or older may opt out of the uniforms for medical, religious, or other reasons as approved by the building principal.

== Schools ==
=== Elementary schools ===
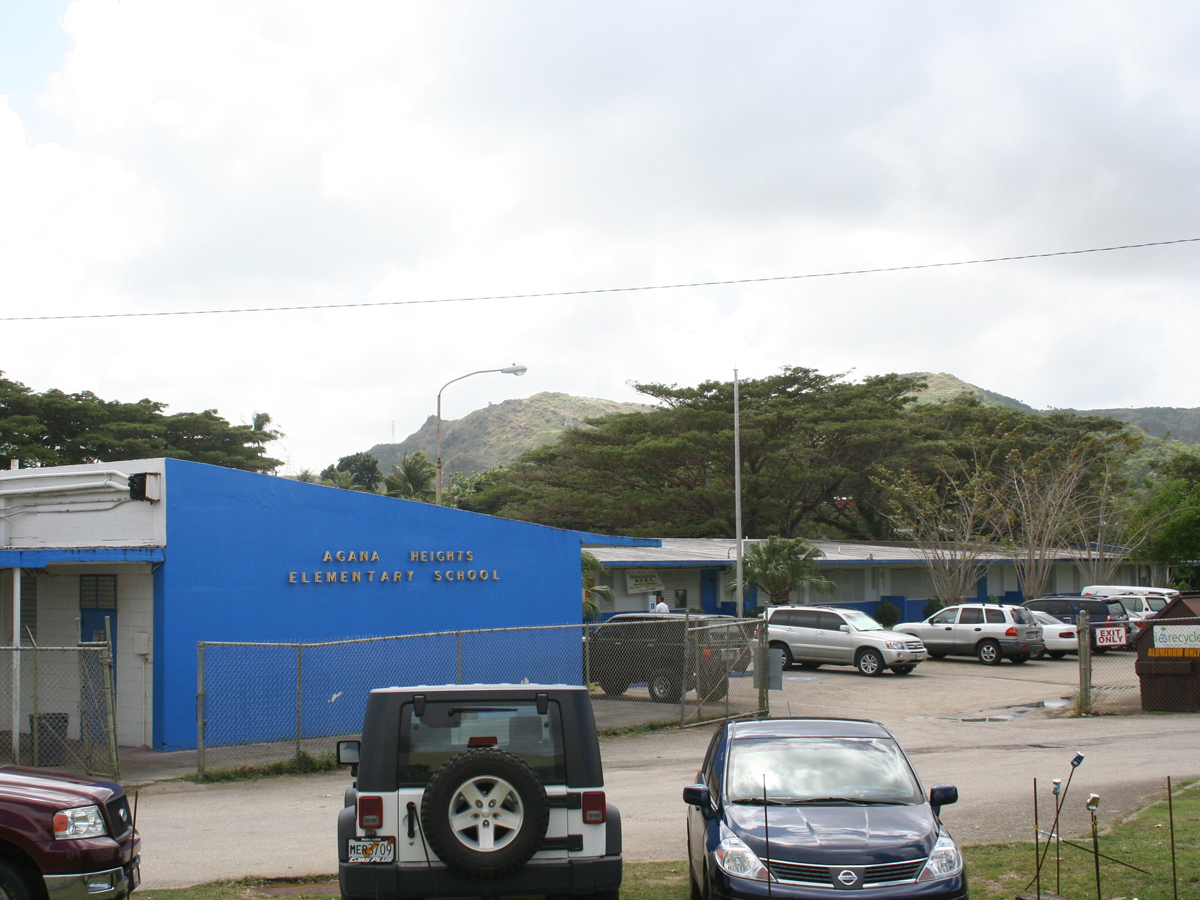
Agana Heights Elementary School

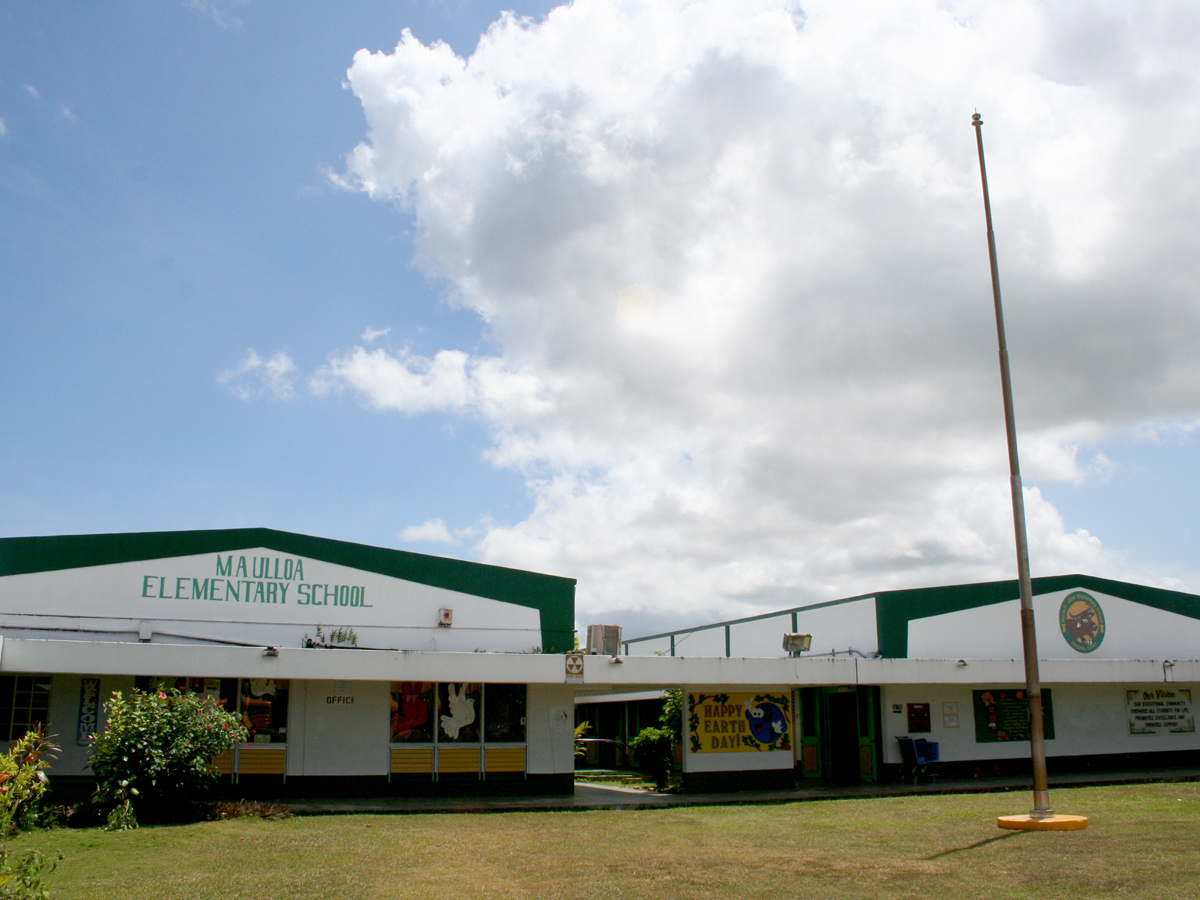
Maria A. Ulloa Elementary School

- Adacao Elementary School (Mangilao, opened 2009)
- Agana Heights Elementary School (Agana Heights, opened 1958)
- Astumbo Elementary School (Dededo, opened 1997)
- B.P. Carbullido Elementary School (Barrigada, opened 1965)
- Chief Brodie Memorial Elementary School (Tumon, Tamuning, opened 1965)
- C.L. Taitano Elementary School (Sinajana, opened 1958)
- Daniel L. Perez Elementary School (Yigo, opened 1968)
  - Formerly Yigo Elementary School (name changed in 1998)
- F.Q. Sanchez Elementary School (Umatac, opened 1953)
- Finegayan Elementary School (Dededo, opened 1972)
- Harry S. Truman Elementary School (Santa Rita, opened 1966)
- Inarajan Elementary School (Inarajan, opened 1953)
- J.Q. San Miguel Elementary School (Mongmong-Toto-Maite, opened 1971)
- Juan M. Guerrero Elementary School (Dededo, opened 1971)
- Lyndon B. Johnson Elementary School (Tamuning, opened 1974)
- Liguan Elementary School (Dededo, opened August 21, 2008)
- Maria A. Ulloa Elementary School (Dededo, opened 1965)
- Machananao Elementary School (Yigo, opened 1998)
- Marcial Sablan Elementary School (Agat, opened 1998)
- Merizo Martyrs Elementary School (Merizo, opened 1966)
- Manuel Ulloa Lujan Elementary School (Yona, opened 1971) ()
- Ordot/Chalan Pago Elementary School (Chalan-Pago-Ordot, opened 1997)
- Pedro C. Lujan Elementary School (Barrigada, opened 1962)
- Captain Henry B. Price Elementary School (Mangilao, opened 1958)
- Talofofo Elementary School (Talofofo, opened 1965)
- Tamuning Elementary School (Tamuning, opened 1965)
- Upi Elementary School (Yigo, opened 1958)
  - Formerly Andersen Elementary (name changed in 1990)
- Wettengel Elementary School (Dededo, opened 1968)

=== Middle schools ===
- Astumbo Middle School (Dededo, opened on August 21, 2008)
- Agueda Johnston Middle School (Chalan Pago-Ordot, opened 1966)
- F.B. Leon Guerrero Middle School (Yigo, opened 1974)
- Inarajan Middle School (Inarajan, opened 1973)
- Jose Rios Middle School (Piti, opened 1973)
- Luis P. Untalan Middle School (Barrigada, opened 1958)
- Oceanview Middle School (Agat, opened 1959)
  - Originally Oceanview High School; became Oceanview Middle School in 1997.
- Vicente San Agustin Benavente Middle School (Dededo, opened 1966)
  - Originally known as Dededo Middle School or Dededo Junior High; became VSA Benavente Middle School in 1999.

=== High schools ===
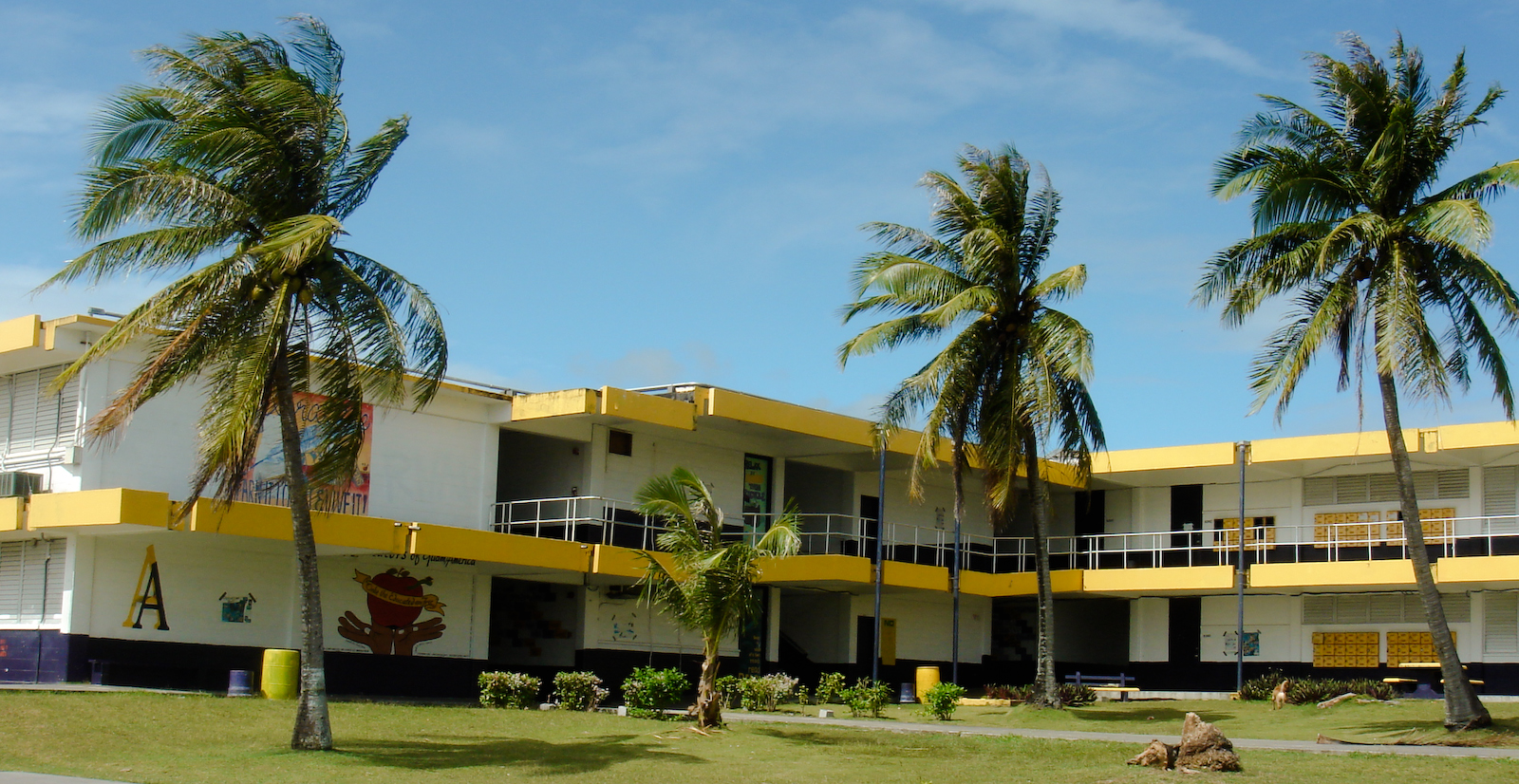
George Washington High School

- John F. Kennedy High School (Tumon, Tamuning, opened 1959)
  - Originally called Tumon High School
- Okkodo High School (Dededo, opened on August 21, 2008)
- Simon Sanchez High School (Yigo, opened 1974)
  - Founded as a junior high school in 1974, became a high school in 1981.
- Southern High School (Santa Rita, opened 1997)
- Tiyan High School (opened 2014)
- George Washington High School (Mangilao, opened 1965)

== Former schools ==
- Inarajan High School (Inarajan) (Closed in 1997 and reopened as Inarajan Middle School)

== See also ==
- List of schools in Guam
