= Dededo, Guam =

Dededo Dedidu
- Village
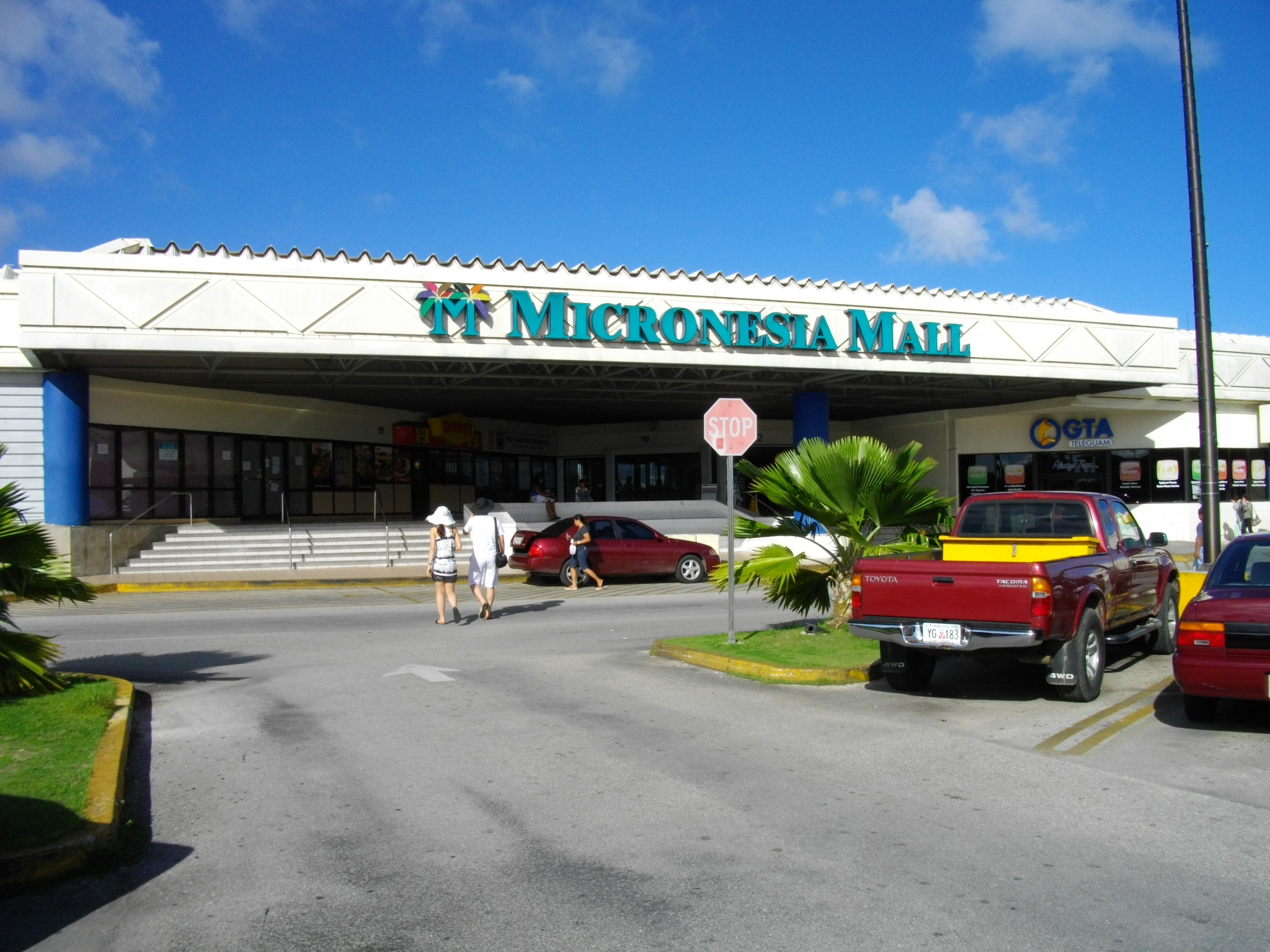
- Micronesia Mall, Guam's largest shopping mall.

- Coordinates: 13°30′34.17″N 144°50′11.50″E
- Country: United States
- Territory: Guam

Government
  - Mayor: Peter J. Benavente (D)
  - Vice Mayor: Ann S.A. Leon Guerrero (D)

Area
  - Village: 30.56 sq mi (79.16 km^{2})
  - Urban: 60.41 sq mi (156.5 km^{2})

Population (2020)
  - Village: 44,908
  - Density: 1,498.1/sq mi (578.4/km^{2})
  - Urban: 139,825
  - Urban density: 2,314.8/sq mi (893.7/km^{2})
- Time zone: UTC+10:00 (ChST)

Dededo (Chamorro: Dedidu; Spanish pronunciation: [deˈðeðo]) is the most populated village in the United States territory of Guam. According to the U.S. Census Bureau, Dededo's population was just under 45,000 in 2020. The village is located on the coral plateau of Northern Guam. The greater Dededo-Machanao-Apotgan Urban Cluster had a population of 139,825 as of the 2010 census, making up 87.7% of Guam's population and 29.8% of its area.

== Etymology ==
The origin of the village name Dededo (Chamorro: Dedidu), may have come from measuring the original village using fingers, as the Spanish word for finger is dedo.

Another possibility is the word dededo comes from the word dedeggo, "heel of the foot," or deggo, "to walk on tiptoes."

== History ==
Before World War II, the main portion of Dededo was at the bottom of Macheche Hill. Dededo grew into a major village after the war when the U.S. Navy constructed housing for displaced Guamanians, and for laborers from off-island helping Guam's development.

Following Typhoon Karen in 1962, Kaiser Subdivision in Dededo was constructed for islanders displaced by the storm. Further housing subdivisions were constructed increasing the village's population.

The first McDonald's in Guam was opened in the village on June 10, 1971.

In 1984, the Northern Community Health Center opened. In addition to traditional health services provided by village clinics, the center offered communicable disease control, dental health, chronic disease care, and crippled children services.

In October 1988, the island's first large-scale and fully enclosed shopping mall, Micronesia Mall, opened in Dededo.

U.S. military installations in the village include Marine Corps Base Camp Blaz, Naval Computer and Telecommunications Station Guam, and portions of Andersen Air Force Base, including Northwest Field.

== Demographics ==
The U.S. Census Bureau has the municipality in multiple census-designated places: Dededo, Astumbo, Finegayan Station, Liguan, Machanao, Machananao East, Machananao West, Macheche, Mogfog, Ukudu, Wusstig, Y Papao, and Y Sengsong.

== Economy ==
Micronesia Mall is the largest shopping mall in Guam and serves as a cultural and recreational venue as well, with movie theaters and an amusement park.

There is also a popular weekend flea market in town which attracts large crowds of vendors.

There are many small commercial businesses near the village center.

== Geography ==
Dededo is situated on a relatively flat limestone plateau in the northern part of the island. It is located at the north central part of the island roughly at the center of population. It encompasses an area of about 30 square miles (78 km^{2}) of Guam's 209 square miles (540 km^{2}). The headquarters for the Guam National Wildlife Refuge are in Dededo.

Tourist sites in Dededo include the Ritidian Unit of the Guam National Wildlife Refuge, the Micronesia Mall, Two Lovers Point, as well as parks, trails, and beaches. Beaches include Tanguisson Beach, Shark Cove Beach, Haputo Beach, and Urono Beach. Haputo and Urono Beaches are listed on the U.S. National Register of Historic Places. The South Finegayan Latte Stone Park is also listed on the National Register of Historic Places.

The Federal government of the United States owns portions of the land in Dededo; the Government of Guam stated that it was one of several villages that are "characterized primarily by the large proportion of land owned by the federal government".

== Climate ==
Climate data for Dededo, Guam
Month	Jan	Feb	Mar	Apr	May	Jun	Jul	Aug	Sep	Oct	Nov	Dec	Year
Mean daily maximum °F (°C)	82 (28)	82 (28)	84 (29)	86 (30)	86 (30)	86 (30)	86 (30)	86 (30)	86 (30)	86 (30)	84 (29)	84 (29)	85 (29)
Mean daily minimum °F (°C)	69 (21)	69 (21)	71 (22)	71 (22)	73 (23)	71 (22)	71 (22)	71 (22)	71 (22)	71 (22)	73 (23)	71 (22)	71 (22)
Average precipitation inches (mm)	5.7 (140)	4.8 (120)	3.8 (97)	4.0 (100)	5.2 (130)	6.4 (160)	11.1 (280)	15.3 (390)	14.3 (360)	13.0 (330)	9.4 (240)	6.5 (170)	99.6 (2,530)
Source: Weatherbase

== Education ==
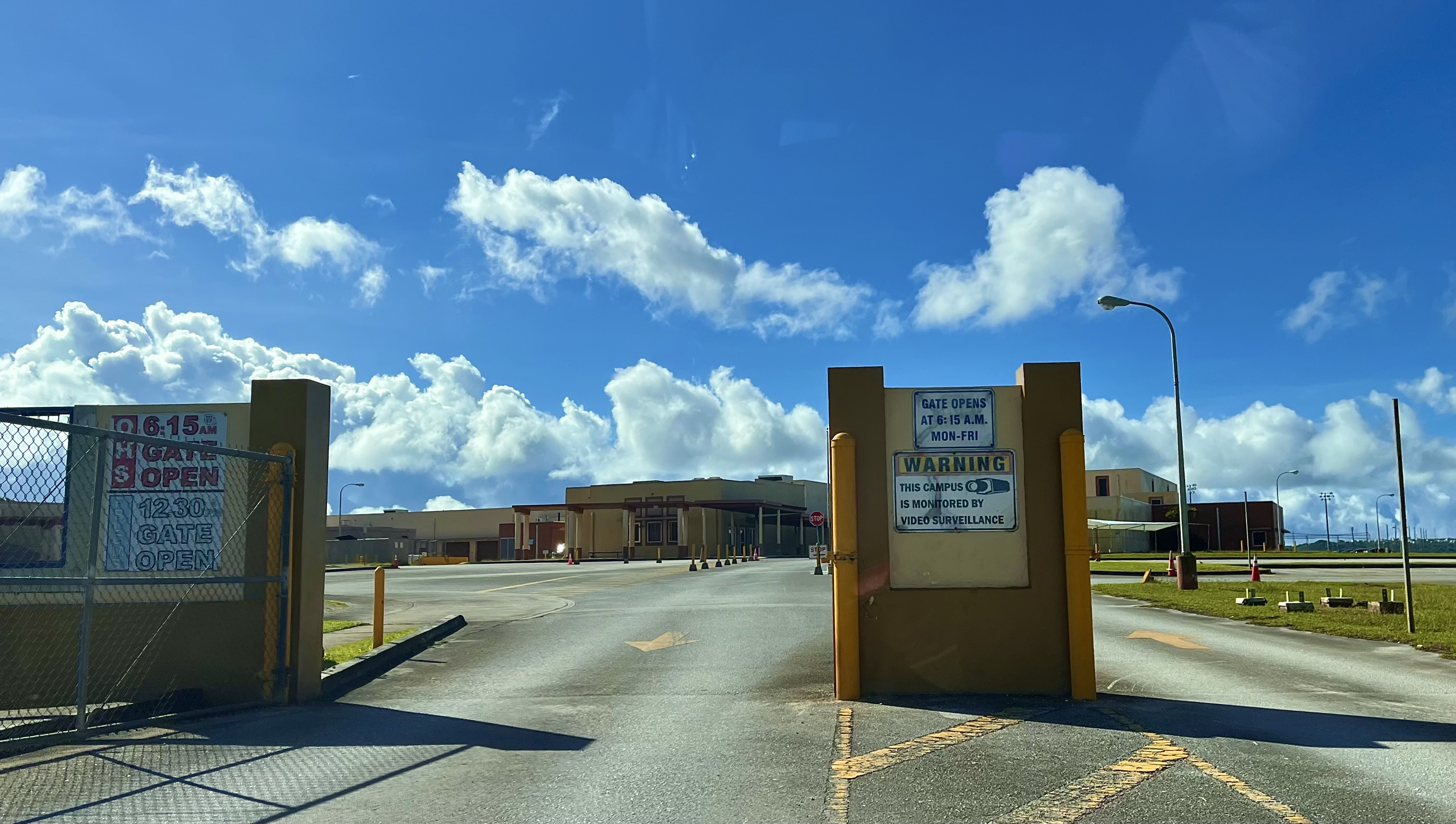
Okkodo High School

Dededo has several public and private schools to accommodate the growing number of residents of the island's most populous village including Guam Department of Education institutions. The village is served by six elementary schools, two middle schools, and one high school.

- Astumbo Elementary School
- Finegayan Elementary School
- Juan M. Guerrero Elementary School
- Maria A. Ulloa Elementary School
- Wettengel Elementary School
- Liguan Elementary School
- Vicente S. A. Benavente Middle School
- Astumbo Middle School
- Okkodo High School

In regards to the Department of Defense Education Activity (DoDEA), Dededo is in the school transportation zone for Andersen Elementary and Andersen Middle School, while Guam High School is the island's sole DoDEA high school.

Private schools:

- Santa Barbara Catholic School
- St. Paul's Christian School
- Pacific Christian Academy

== Government ==
Commissioner of Dededo
Name	Term begin	Term end
Jose F. Lujan	1932	1934
Ignacio A. Santos	1934	1940
Juan Pangelinan	1940	1941
Hector Sgambelluri	1941	1944
Ramon S. San Agustin	1944	1952
Vicente S.A. Benavente	1952	1976
Prospero C. Zamora	1976	January 3, 1977

Mayor of Dededo
Name	Party	Term begin	Term end
Jose M. Garrido	Republican	January 3, 1977	January 5, 1981
Martin C. Benavente	Democratic	January 5, 1981	January 7, 1985
Patricia S. Quinata	Democratic	January 7, 1985	January 2, 1989
Jose A. Rivera	Republican	January 2, 1989	January 1, 2001
Scott D. Duenas	Republican	January 1, 2001	January 3, 2005
Melissa B. Savares	Democratic	January 3, 2005	January 4, 2025
Peter J.S. Benavente	Democratic	January 4, 2025	present

Assistant Commissioner of Dededo
Name	Term begin	Term end
Ignacio A. Santos	1918	1934
Manuel M. Lujan	1934	1941
Teresita B. Umagat	1971	1973
Prospero C. Zamora	1973	January 3, 1977

Vice Mayor of Dededo
Name	Party	Term begin	Term end
Erwin F. Flauta	Democratic	January 3, 1977	1978
Martin C. Benavente	Democratic	1978	January 5, 1981
Patricia S. Quinata	Democratic	January 5, 1981	January 7, 1985
Jose A. Rivera	Republican	January 7, 1985	January 2, 1989
Doris S. Palacios	Republican	January 2, 1989	January 1, 2001
Melissa B. Savares	Democratic	January 1, 2001	January 3, 2005
Andrew A. Benavente	Democratic	January 3, 2005	January 2, 2017
Frank A. Benavente	Republican	January 2, 2017	January 4, 2021
Peter J.S. Benavente	Democratic	January 4, 2021	January 4, 2025
Ann S.A. Leon Guerrero	Democratic	January 4, 2025	present

== Sports ==
Wettengel Rugby Field and GFA National Training Center are located in Dededo. Guam Track and Field Association is also located in the village.

== Notable people ==
- Joe Duarte, mixed martial artist
- Ping Duenas, politician
- Louise Borja Muna - Guamanian singer, radio host, and politician.
- Anthony Paulino, soccer player
- Ray Robson, chess grandmaster
- Regine Tugade, sprinter
- Rain Valdez, actress

== Gallery ==
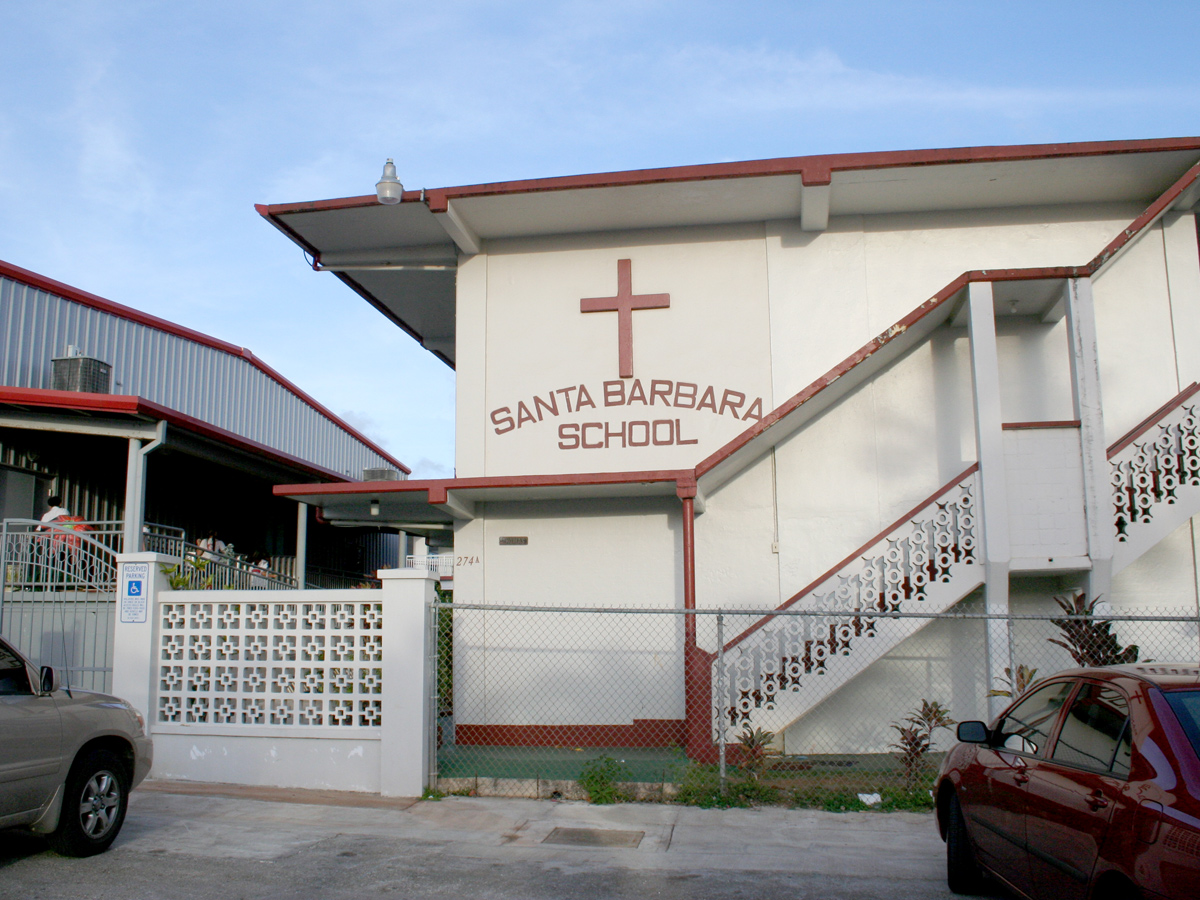
Santa Barbara School

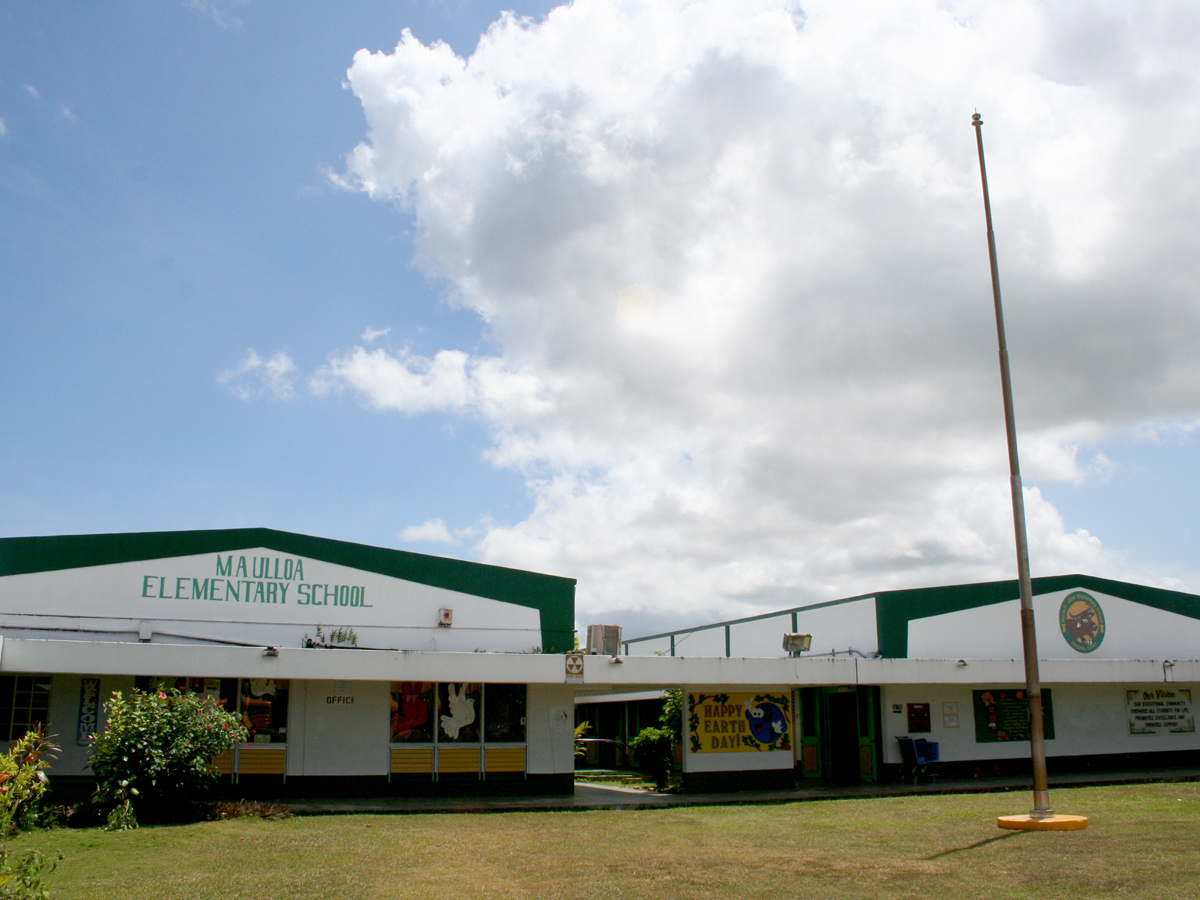
Maria A. Ulloa Elementary School in Dededo
