= Northern Mariana Islands National Guard =

Component of the US National Guard of the territory of the Northern Mariana Islands

The Northern Mariana Islands National Guard is a proposed National Guard unit to be formed in the Commonwealth of the Northern Mariana Islands. Currently, residents of the Northern Mariana Islands may serve in the Guam National Guard.

== History ==
Currently, there are National Guard units in all 50 U.S. states, the District of Columbia, Guam, Puerto Rico and the United States Virgin Islands. The Northern Mariana Islands and American Samoa are the only permanently inhabited U.S. territories that do not have a National Guard unit.

The first legislative attempt at forming a National Guard unit in the Northern Mariana Islands occurred on October 12, 2001. Democratic U.S. House Delegate Robert A. Underwood of Guam introduced H.R. 3128 to the 107th United States Congress that proposed the establishment of a National Guard of the Northern Mariana Islands. The bill, which would have amended titles 32 and 37 of the United States Code, was sent to the House Armed Services Subcommittee on Military Personnel where it eventually died in committee.

In 2002, Senate Bill 13-11, also known as the Northern Mariana Islands National Guard Act, was proposed to the Northern Mariana Islands Commonwealth Legislature that established a militia for the Northern Mariana Islands. The bill was signed to law by Northern Mariana Islands governor Juan Babauta as Public Law 13-32 on November 25, 2002. In 2003, the U.S. House of Representatives declined to authorize $275 million in funding for the creation of the proposed National Guard unit due to budget constraints and concerns over whether the Northern Mariana Islands could form such a unit given the commonwealth's population of roughly 50,000 (about one-third the population of Guam). In 2004, Gov. Babauta met with the adjutant general of the Guam National Guard to discuss the militia’s composition, organization, and other pertinent matters, including funding.

On August 1, 2011, U.S. House Delegate Gregorio Sablan of the Northern Mariana Islands introduced H.R. 2773 to the 112th United States Congress again seeking to establish a National Guard unit in the Northern Mariana Islands. The bill was originally co-sponsored by Republican representative Walter B. Jones, Jr. (North Carolina) and Democratic delegates Donna Christian-Christensen (U.S. Virgin Islands) and Eleanor Holmes Norton (District of Columbia). Later co-sponsors were Democratic representative Mike Honda (California) and Democratic delegate Eni Faleomavaega (American Samoa). The bill sought to amend titles 10, 32 and 37 of the United States Code. The bill was introduced again to the House Armed Services Subcommittee on Military Personnel but did not make it out of committee.

== Typhoon Soudelor ==
On August 2, 2015, Typhoon Soudelor struck the Northern Mariana Islands as the equivalent of a Category 2 hurricane, causing over $20 million in damage to the island of Saipan. On August 4, units of the Guam National Guard and the United States Coast Guard were deployed to assist in relief efforts. Del. Sablan renewed the call for a separate National Guard unit in the Northern Mariana Islands, later commenting, “We pray we never have to experience another disaster like Typhoon Soudelor. But if we do, we will be better prepared to respond if we have our own National Guard to call to service.”

== Feasibility study ==
The National Defense Authorization Act for Fiscal Year 2014 mandated that the National Guard Bureau conduct a study regarding the feasibility of establishing a National Guard unit in the Northern Mariana Islands. Released in August 2015, the study concluded that a National Guard for the Northern Mariana Islands composed of two company-sized units (in addition to U.S. Army Reserve personnel already residing in Saipan) was feasible but required several major actions, including changes to the federal law that governs the National Guard.

On September 29, 2015, Del. Sablan introduced H.R. 3649, which was a reintroduction of H.R. 2773, to the 114th United States Congress. The bill was referred to the House Armed Services Subcommittee on Readiness, but again failed to make it out of committee.
