= Anthony Paulino =

Personal information
- Full name: Anthony Paulino
- Date of birth: 8 June 1994 (age 32)
- Height: 1.82 m (6 ft 0 in)
- Position: Defender

Team information
- Current team: Washington Huskies

Youth career
- 2009–2012: Salesian Mustangs
- 2012: Crossfire Premier
- 2012–: Washington Huskies

International career
Years	Team	Apps	(Gls)
2012	Guam	2	(0)

Anthony Paulino (born 8 June 1994 in Lower Astumbo, Dededo) is a Guamanian international footballer, who currently plays for the Washington Huskies soccer team.

== Career ==
He attended the Father Duenas Memorial School and played for the soccer team of the Friars. In 2010 Paulino moved to LA and played for the Salesian High School (Los Angeles). Paulino played in 2012 during his senior year of Salesian High, for the Crossfire Premier soccer team in the U.S. Soccer Development Academy.

After his graduating in 2012 from the High School, signed for his studium with the University of Washington.

=== International ===
The former Guam national under-16 Captain, made his first appearance for the Guam national football team in 2012.
