= Harvest Christian Academy (Guam) =

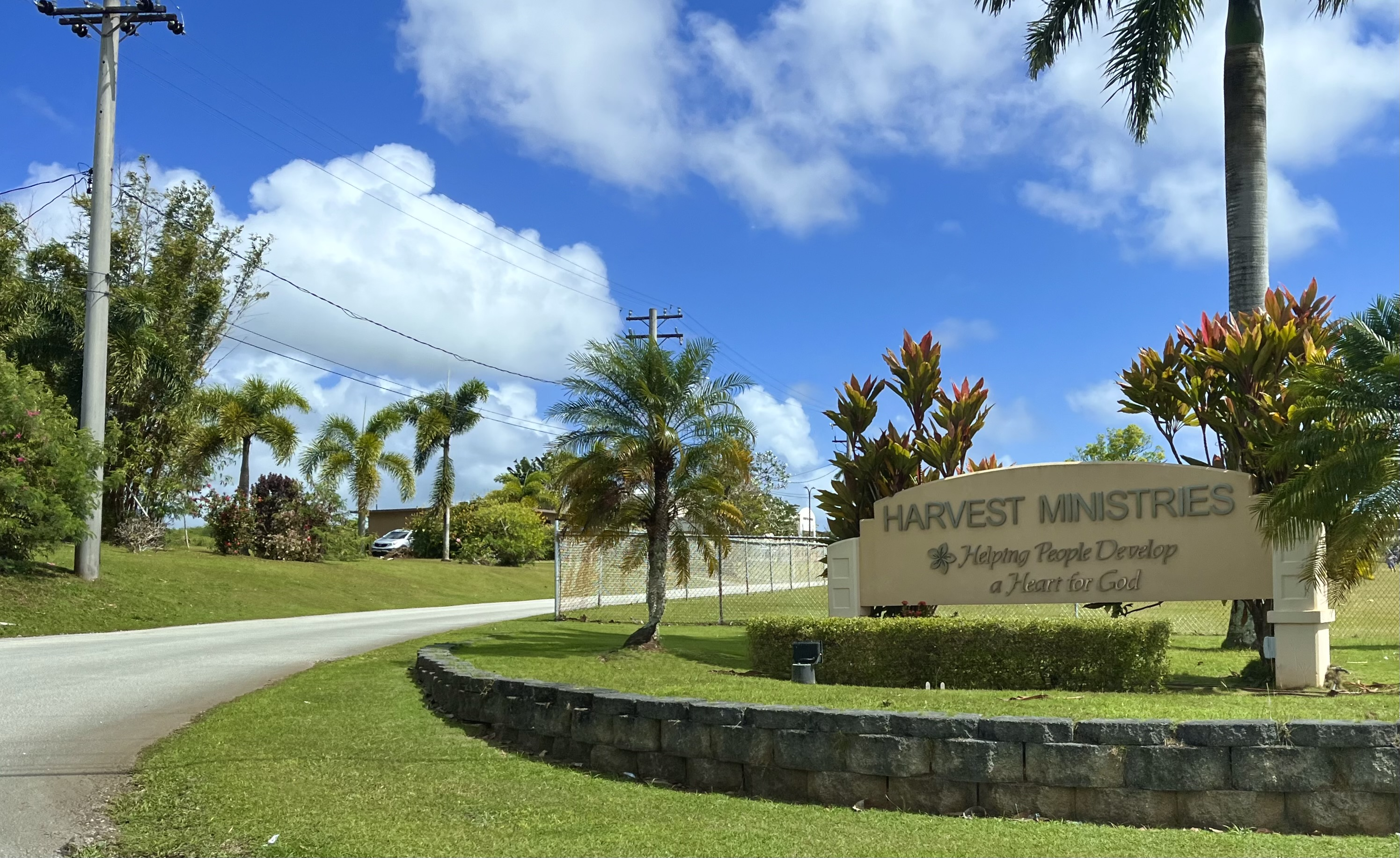

Location
- 170C Machuate Street; Barrigada, Guam 96913
- Coordinates: 13.4695°N 144.7848°E

Information
- Established: 1975
- Grades: K3-12
- Website: hcaguam.org

Harvest Christian Academy (HCA) is a private Christian school in Barrigada, Guam.

The school offers open enrollment for grades K3-12. HCA is administrated by and closely associated with Harvest Baptist Church (HBC). HBC was started in 1975 as a missionary church. The school was started the same year for the children of the congregation members. Over the years, the school's enrollment was opened to the community of Guam and now enrolls nearly 1,000 students each year in K3-12th grade. Harvest Ministries, Guam now also owns and operates KHMG radio station.

The campus is spread out on 12 acres (49,000 m^{2}) consisting of classrooms for kindergarten, elementary, junior and senior high. HCA also offers two computer labs, science lab, and library to their students. The school has an outdoor basketball court, soccer field, art room and piano lab for extracurricular activities. Also available to the school and public is a bookstore and cafe.

In April 2009, the Family Life Center, also known as the FLC, was added to Harvest's list of buildings. This is the main site of Harvest's wrestling and American football games for the junior high and high school. Harvest's middle school soccer team has won the championship four times in a row, while the high school team has won it once. Harvest's sports' teams are called the HCA Eagles and Lady Hawks.

== See also ==
- List of schools in Guam
