= Japanese School of Guam =

- グアム日本人学校

Location
- 170 Terao Street, Mangilao, GU 96913; Mangilao, Guam; United States
- Coordinates: 13.447854°N 144.809026°E

Information
- Type: Primary & middle school
- Grades: 1-9
- Website: japaneseschoolguam.com

The Japanese School of Guam (グアム日本人学校, Guamu Nihonjin Gakkō) is a Japanese international school in Mangilao, Guam. It includes both day school and weekend supplementary school divisions, and the school also holds Japanese language classes. As of April 2013 Toyohito Yoneyama is the chairperson of the school.

== History ==
Prior to the establishment of the day school, Japanese children in Guam attended a special supplementary Japanese school. The Guam Japanese Association began considering making one in March 1972 and it opened by May 1973. It occupied the conference room of the Japan Airlines office at Guam Airport, then St. John's School beginning in September 1975, then to the Fujita Hotel beginning in September 1979, then six classrooms in Tamuning Elementary School beginning in July 1987.

Around the years 1987-1989 there was a committee held to establish a Japanese day school in Guam, with the decision to formally create a Japanese school being made in April 1988. The day school opened in April 1989 as the Agana Japanese School (アガナ日本人学校 Agana Nihonjin Gakkō). Originally its campus was the Pacific Islands Club (PIC) Hotel in Tamuning, near Hagåtña (Agana), which now housed both day and weekend schools. In April 1990 the permanent campus in Mangilao opened. The dedication occurred the previous March. The building, with 10 classrooms, had a total cost of $2,000,000.

The school received its current name on March 17, 1999 (Heisei 11).

A kindergarten division was created in 2002, with 2 students enrolling that year.

== See also ==
- Japanese language education in the United States
- American School in Japan, American international school in Tokyo
