= George Washington High School (Guam) =

Public high school in Mangilao, Guam, United States

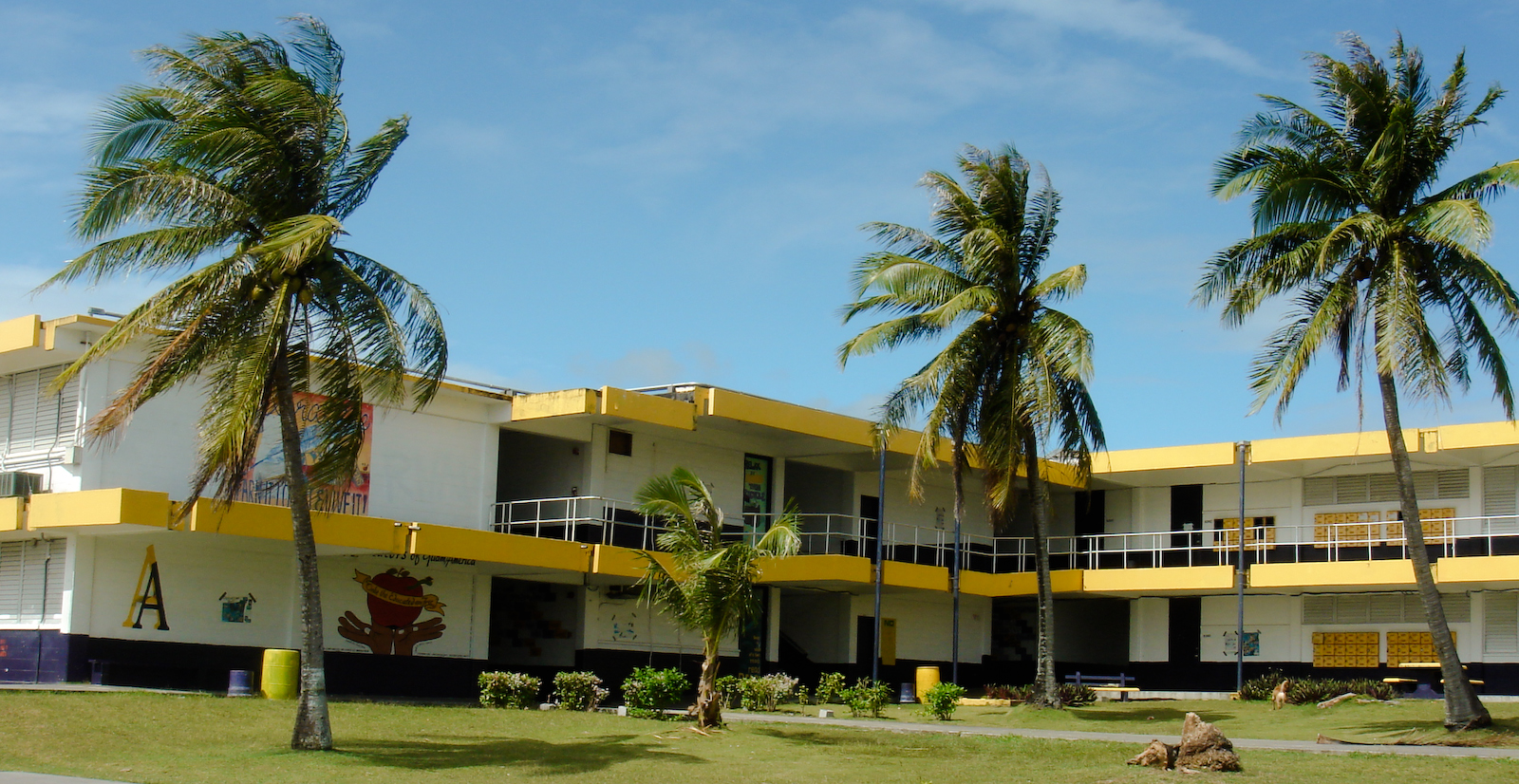
- George Washington High School in 2007

Location
- 298 Washington Drive; Mangilao, Guam 96913; United States; 13°26′17″N 144°48′21″E

Information
- Opened: 1965
- Principal: Dexter Fullo
- Grades: 9-12
- Enrollment: 2,610 (2009-10)
- Website: gwhsgeckos.com

George Washington High School is a public secondary school located at 298 Washington Drive in Mangilao, in the United States territory of Guam.

The school, a part of the Guam Department of Education (formerly Guam Public School System), opened in 1965 and serves grades 9 through 12.

As of 2014 the school serves the villages of Mangilao, Agana Heights, Chalan Pago-Ordot, and Sinajana. At the start of this school year, students residing in the villages of Barrigada and Mongmong-Toto-Maite are required to attend Tiyan High School.

The U.S. Census Bureau puts the school into the University of Guam census-designated place.

== Student body ==
During the 2009-2010 school year, the school had 2,610 students. Of them, 1,750 (67%) were Chamorro, 346 (13.3%) were Filipino, 199 (7.6%) were Chuukese, 60 (2.3%) were Palauan, 43 (1.6%) were Yapese, 37 (1.4%) were Others/Mixed, 34 (1.3%) were White, 32 (1.2%) were Pohnpeian, 17 were from Saipan, 14 were Korean, 13 were other Pacific Islanders (such as Fijians), 12 were African American, 11 were Marshallese, 8 were Chinese, 6 were Hawaiian, 6 were Latino, 6 were Kosraean, 5 were from Rota, 3 were Japanese, 3 were Samoan, 2 were Native American/Alaska Natives, 2 were Vietnamese, and 1 was Indonesian.

As of 2025, 74% of the students are eligible for Free Lunch and 26% are eligible for Reduced Lunch under the National School Lunch Program.

George Washington High School requires uniforms, along with the rest of the schools under the Guam Public School System.

== Notable alumni ==
- Esther Aguigui, Guam adjutant general
- Bob Barney, American academic and sports historian
- Dave Barney, American educator and swimming coach
- Lourdes Perez Camacho, Guamanian Medical Technologist and First Lady of Guam.
- Carmen Fernandez, Guamanian businesswoman, politician, and college administrator.
- Franklin Quitugua, Guam politician
- Rosanne Santos Ada, Guamanian First Lady of Guam.
- Roman Tmetuchl, Paluan politician
- Frances Tydingco-Gatewood, Judge of the District Court of Guam
