= Tiyan High School =

High school in Barrigada, Guam, United States

Location
- 13-15 Mariner Ave; Barrigada, Guam 96913; United States; 13.4780°N 144.8033°E

Information
- Type: Public school
- Opened: August 14, 2014
- School district: Guam Department of Education
- Principal: Sophia Duenas
- Grades: 9–12
- Enrollment: 1,100 (2024-2025)
- Colors: Black, White, and Gold
- Team name: Titans
- Website: sites.google.com/gdoe.net/ths/

Tiyan High School (THS) is a senior high school in Barrigada, Guam. It is a part of the Guam Department of Education.

The school district encompasses students from the villages of Adelup, Anigua, Barrigada, Barrigada Heights, Hagåtña, Macheche, Asan-Maina, Mogfog, Mongmong-Toto-Maite, Tiyan

The school first opened in August 2014, making it the newest high school to open on the island. Approximately 1,400 students were scheduled to attend the school on opening day. It opened with a practice gymnasium. Construction on the school's full-size gymnasium began in 2015. The full-size gym is being built for $14.4 million, or $576,218.61 each year for 25 years. The full-size gym was completed in December 2015, being the primary location for basketball and volleyball games at the campus.

On August 13, 2026, Tiyan High School's campus was closed after failing a sanitary inspection conducted by the Guam Department of Public Health and Social Services (DPHSS). The closure followed concerns regarding unsanitary conditions at the campus. Guam Department of Education (GDOE) and CoreTech had previously been working to address the reported issues before the inspection.

== Student life ==
=== Academics ===
In accordance with Guam Education Board policy, Tiyan High students are required to have 24 credits and 75 service learning hours in order to graduate. Tiyan High School is notable for being the only "model career academy" school on the island, as recognized by the National Career Academy Coalition. All three academies at the school received model status designations during this accreditation.

Students also participate in academic competitions such as the Academic Challenge Bowl and mock trial.

=== Athletics ===
Tiyan High School participates in the GDOE-sanctioned Interscholastic Sports Association array of sports for both boys and girls divisions. Sports available at the school include cross country, bowling, football, soccer, track and field, baseball, softball, rugby, basketball, volleyball, dance, and cheer. The boys volleyball team won the ISA League Title three years in a row from 2021-2023. The dance team placed in several categories during its first year of competition.

=== Air Force Junior Reserve Officers Training Corps (AFJROTC) ===
Tiyan High School started offering an Air Force JROTC program to its students in SY 2017-2018. The unit is officially designated under unit number GU-2017-1st. Under the AFJROTC program, cadets develop leadership skills, discipline, and time-management skills. In SY 2024-2025, Tiyan's AFJROTC unit achieved the highest possible inspection grade, receiving an "Exceeds Standards" on their official unit evaluation.
