= St. John's School (Guam) =

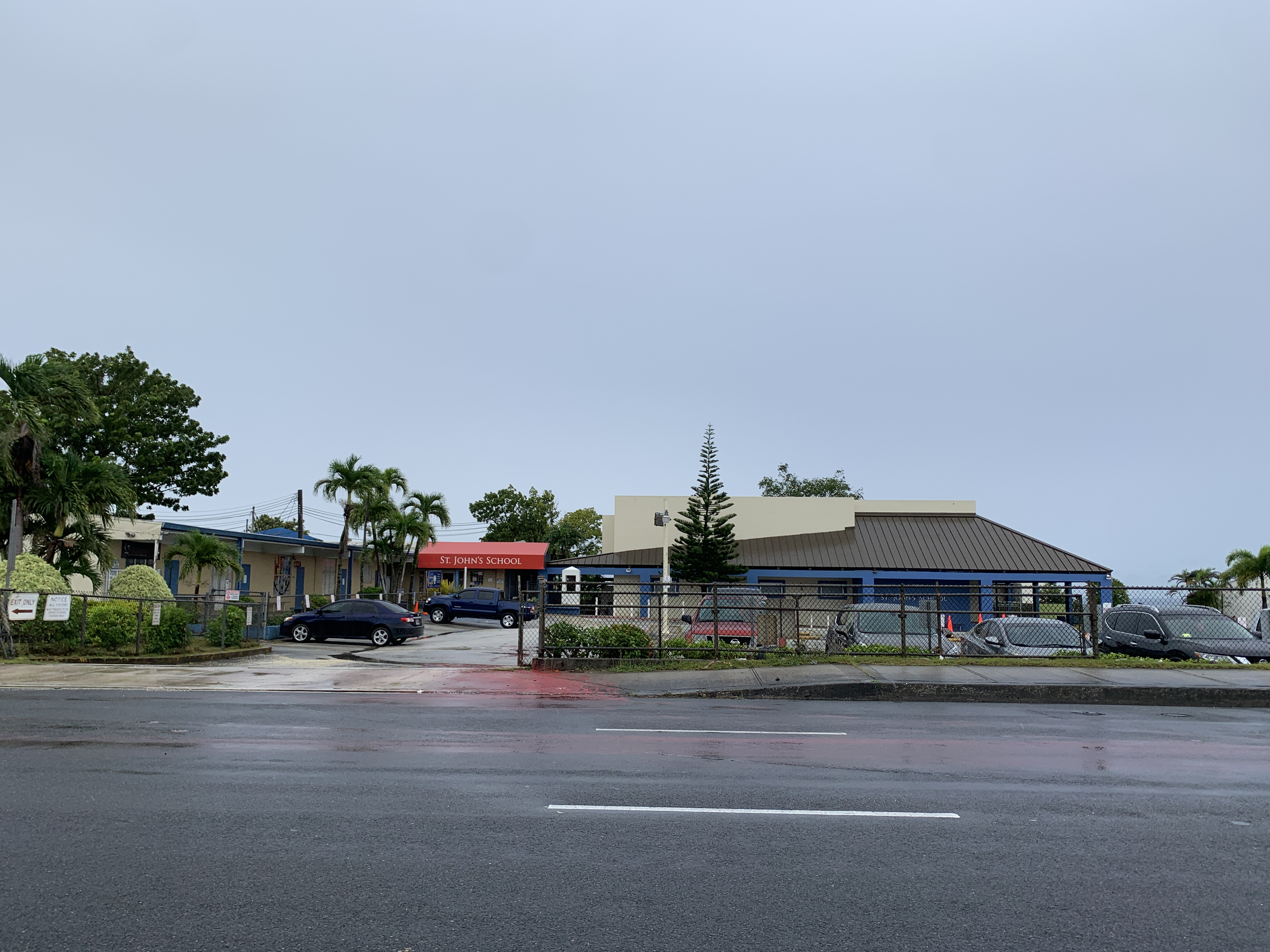

Location
- 911 North Marine Corps Drive; Tumon Bay, GU 96913
- 13.5080°N 144.8093°E

Information
- Type: Private primary and secondary school
- Motto: Ad Astra per Optima or Reach for the stars.
- Established: 1962
- President: Bart Jackson
- Head of school: Michelle Untalan
- Grades: Pre-K3 to 12
- Colors: Red and white
- Athletics: Mr. Chris Shepherd
- Athletics conference: Independent Interscholastic Athletic Association of Guam
- Mascot: Knights
- Affiliation: Episcopal
- Information: 671-646-8080
- Website: www.stjohnsguam.com

St. John's School is a private college preparatory school located in the Tumon area of Tamuning, Guam, United States.

The school, affiliated with the Episcopal Church in Micronesia, serves students from pre-kindergarten through 12th grade. The school is accredited by the Western Association of Schools and Colleges (WASC) and authorized by the International Baccalaureate Organisation (IBO) to provide the IBO Diploma.

== History ==
The first off-base Episcopal Church established on Guam is St. John the Divine, which was established in Upper Tumon, Guam in 1957. The church originally occupied three Quonset huts donated by the Navy, but a parish hall was built in 1961, making two of the huts vacant and motivating the parishioners to request they be used for a school.

St. John's School opened in September 1962 with five teachers to serve children in kindergarten through fourth grade age groups. In November 1962, Super Typhoon Karen destroyed the Quonset huts, which were replaced with tents by the Marines. Since the island's public schools were badly damaged, the Air Force requested St. John's to immediately add grades 5 and 6 because of the need on the island.

In April 1963, Typhoon Olive tore apart the school tents. New tents were put up by the Marines and instructional kits given by the Red Cross helped the school get going again. Soon after, the school hired Perez Brothers to build the 10-room Butler building. In 1964, the five-room concrete building in front of the school was added.

== The beginnings of St. John's Church and School ==
In the mid-1950s a group of stateside civil workers primarily for Anderson Air Force Base submitted a petition to Bishop Kennedy in Honolulu requesting for an Episcopal mission here.

In 1957, the Rev. Richard Baker of Western New York started the mission, serving one 3-year term. At that time, the island would not sell land to a non-Roman Catholic church. However, eventually the church was able to buy the 7.5-acre (30,000 m^{2}) Upper Tumon land from Vance O. Smith.

In 1960, the Rev. Grosvenor Needham of Chicago, together with his wife Bernice and his children Margo and Jonathan, moved to Guam to head the Guam mission. He had expressed an interest in an overseas assignment and chose Guam out of four possibilities because his sister-in-law recommended it.

Bishop Kennedy showed Rev. Needham the plans for the property which included the church and eventual school. He told him his job at the moment was to build a vicarage and a Parish Hall. During that time, the property had three Quonset huts donated by the Navy. The large one served as the Church while the two smaller ones housed the Sunday School and the custodian, Mr. York.

In 1961 a Parish Hall was built. The church also moved into the Hall, making two Quonset huts vacant. Seeing this, the parishioners believed that a school could be started using the huts. The desire of building a school of USDe quality, with its curriculum patterned after California schools, was the driving force which motivated these group of people.

The planners, who also composed the first board of the school included Gordon and Eleanor Mailloux, jewelers; Pat Ehrhart; Dottie Benson; Bob Hartin (Guam Ship Repair executive); and Frank Edwards, a businessman, who oversaw the modifying of the Quonsets to make them suitable for classrooms.

In September 1962, St. John’s School started in the two Quonset huts with five teachers. It opened its doors to children of kindergarten to fourth grade age groups. Rev. Needham served as headmaster/principal. Having a background in education as well as a master's degree in Music, he also taught band and chorus on the secondary level. The school community met together for service in the church once a week.

In November 1962, Super Typhoon Karen destroyed the Quonset huts. A platoon of Marines came to the rescue and put up tents so that the school could go on. Within a month, the school was able to reopen. The Air Force requested St. John’s to add grades 5 and 6 because of the huge need on the island. The request was accommodated, so the school grew that first year.

In April 1963, Typhoon Olive came and tore apart the school tents. The new tents were put up by the Marines and instructional kits given by the Red Cross helped the school get going again. Soon after, the school hired Perez Brothers to build the 10-room Butler building. In 1964, the five-room concrete building in front of the school was added. The year after, a vicarage was built on the property.

In 1964, Marge Drive became principal so Rev. Needham could focus on his duties as headmaster/chaplain. The following year, Pat Ehrhart became principal.

Rev. Needham served two 3-year terms, leaving Guam in 1966. Bishop Kennedy gave him the Distinguished Service Cross for his great contribution to the church on Guam.

In 1970 Dr. Maryly Van Leer Peck came to run the school, during her tenure the school expanded and now runs all the way through high school.

== Students ==
St. John's has an average class size of 15. Students of color make up 90% of the student body; international students make up the other 10%.

== Extracurricular activities ==
The Knights field teams in seven sports: basketball, cross country, golf, rugby, soccer, tennis, and volleyball. All of the teams compete within the Independent Interscholastic Athletic Association of Guam.

St. John's offers the following extracurricular activities:

- Academic Challenge Bowl
- Art Club
- Aviation Club
- Awareness for Special Kids club
- Chemistry Club
- Debate Club
- Engineering Club
- Environmental Club
- Fencing Club
- Filipino Club
- Finance Club
- Handbell Club
- Humanitarian Club
- Japanese Club
- Korean Club
- Mandana Club
- Model UN
- Newspaper Club
- Paws for Life
- Pre-Medical Club
- Service Club
- STUCO
- Tech Support
- Tri-M Music Honor Society

== Notable alumni ==
Pia Mia Perez — singer, actress, author

== See also ==
- List of schools in Guam
