= Guam Air National Guard =

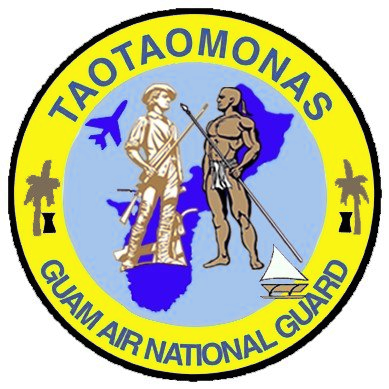
- Guam Air National Guard Emblem
- Active: 24 December 1980 - present
- Country: United States of America
- Allegiance: United States of America; Guam
- Branch: Air National Guard
- Type: Military reserve force
- Role: "To meet commonwealth and federal mission responsibilities
- Part of: Guam National Guard; National Guard; United States National Guard Bureau
- Garrison/HQ: Andersen Air Force Base, Guam

Commanders
- Civilian leadership: President Donald Trump (Commander-in-Chief); Troy Meink (Secretary of the Air Force); Governor Lou Leon Guerrero (Governor of Guam)
- State military leadership: BG

Insignia
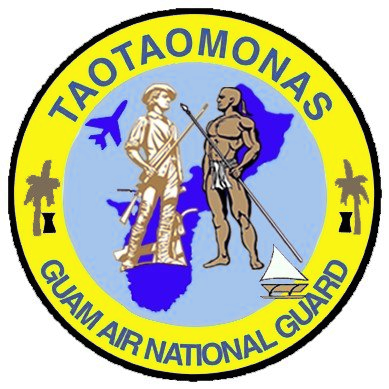
- Emblem of the Guam Air National Guard

The Guam Air National Guard (GU ANG) is the aerial militia of Guam, an unincorporated territory of the United States. It is, along with the Guam Army National Guard, an element of the Guam National Guard, National Guard and United States National Guard Bureau. It is also a reserve of the United States Air Force.

As territorial militia units, the units in the Guam Air National Guard are not in the normal United States Air Force chain of command. They are under the jurisdiction of the governor of Guam though the office of the Guam Adjutant General unless they are federalized by order of the president of the United States. The Guam Air National Guard is headquartered at Andersen Air Force Base, and its commander is Colonel Botha.

== Overview ==
Under the "Total Force" concept, Guam Air National Guard units are considered to be Air Reserve Components (ARC) of the United States Air Force (USAF). Guam ANG units are trained and equipped by the Air Force and are operationally gained by a major command of the USAF if federalized. In addition, the Guam Air National Guard forces are assigned to Air Expeditionary Forces and are subject to deployment tasking orders along with their active duty and Air Force Reserve counterparts in their assigned cycle deployment window.

Along with their federal reserve obligations, as territorial militia units the elements of the Guam ANG are subject to being activated by order of the governor to provide protection of life and property, and preserve peace, order and public safety. Territorial missions include disaster relief in times of earthquakes, hurricanes, floods and forest fires, search and rescue, protection of vital public services, and support to civil defense.

== Components ==
- 254th Air Base Group

Gained by: Pacific Air Forces
During exercises, contingencies, or actual war, the 254th Air Base Group's mission is to provide meteorological support and deploy with, advise, and assist the ground force commander in planning, requesting, coordinating and controlling close air support, tactical air reconnaissance, and tactical airlift. The Guam Air National Guard has a strength of about 450 men and women.
