= Guam Army National Guard =

Joint Forces Headquarters Guam Army National Guard Element
- Guam Army National Guard SSI
- Founded: December 24, 1980
- Country: United States
- Allegiance: Guam
- Type: ARNG Headquarters Command
- Part of: Army National Guard; Guam National Guard
- Garrison/HQ: Guard Readiness Center, Barrigada
- Mottos: Live here, serve here

Commanders
- Current commander: Brigadier General Michael Cruz

Insignia
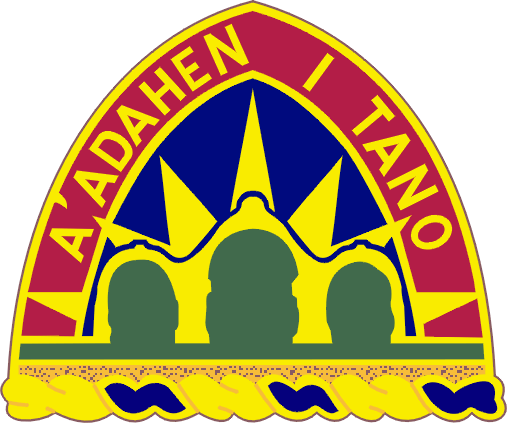
- Guam ARNG Headquarters DUI

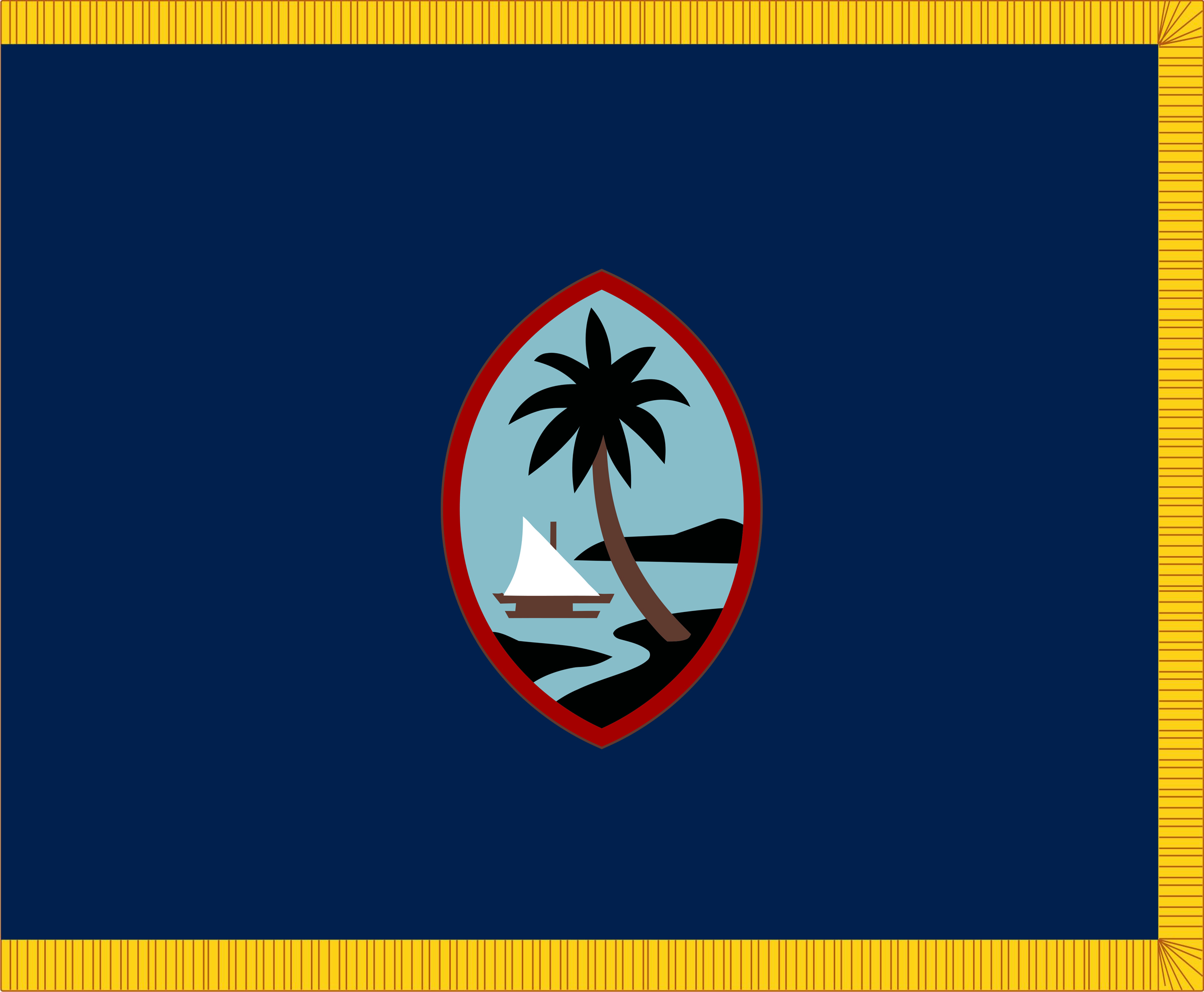
- Guam ARNG Headquarters Flag

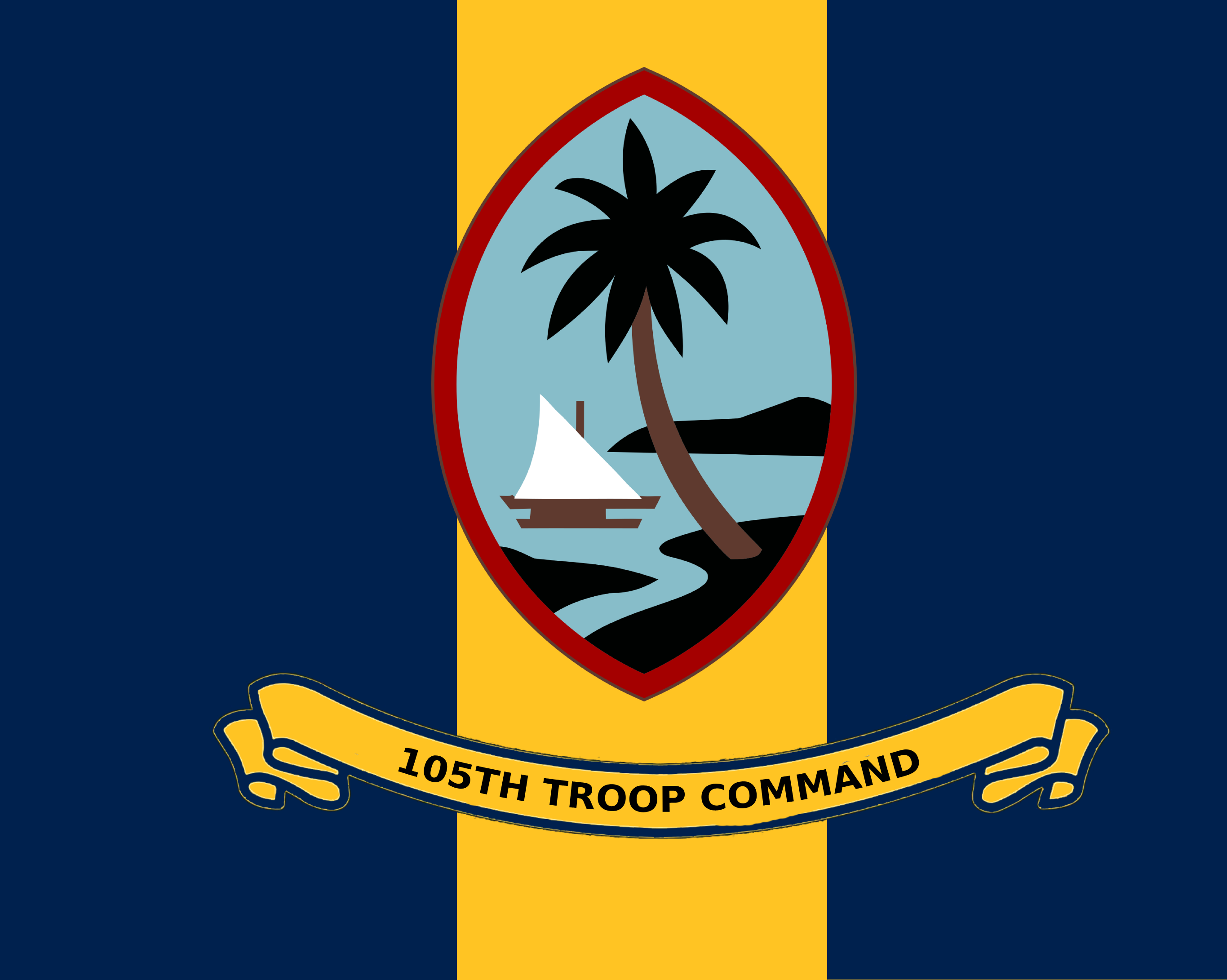
- Guam ARNG 105th Troop Command Flag

- Guam Army National Guard Crest

The Guam National Guard is a federally funded military force, part of the National Guard of the United States. Guam Army National Guard (GU ARNG) is the Army National Guard of Guam which, together with the Guam Air National Guard, comprises the Guam National Guard. GU ARNG is the ground component of the Guam National Guard under control of the governor of Guam that performs missions equivalent to those of the Army National Guards of the different states of the United States, including ground defense, disaster relief, and control of civil unrest.

The Guam Army National Guard also includes residents of the Commonwealth of the Northern Mariana Islands. A proposal has been introduced by U.S. Delegate Gregorio Sablan to form a National Guard unit in the Northern Mariana Islands, and feasibility studies are in progress in response to the proposal.

== History ==
On June 27, 1980, Democratic U.S. House Delegate Antonio Won Pat of Guam introduced H.R. 7694 to the 96th United States Congress which would authorize the establishment of a National Guard unit in Guam. On December 24, 1980, President Jimmy Carter signed the bill into law as Public Law 96-600. On June 5, 1981, Public Law 16-18 established the Guam Army National Guard and the Guam Air National Guard.

On August 6, 1997, the Guam Army National Guard assisted with the recovery efforts of Korean Air Flight 801, which crashed on approach to Antonio Won Pat International Airport. In December 1997, the Guam Army National Guard was activated by Guam governor Carl Gutierrez to assist with relief and cleanup efforts after Supertyphoon Paka struck Guam, causing over $100 million in damage.

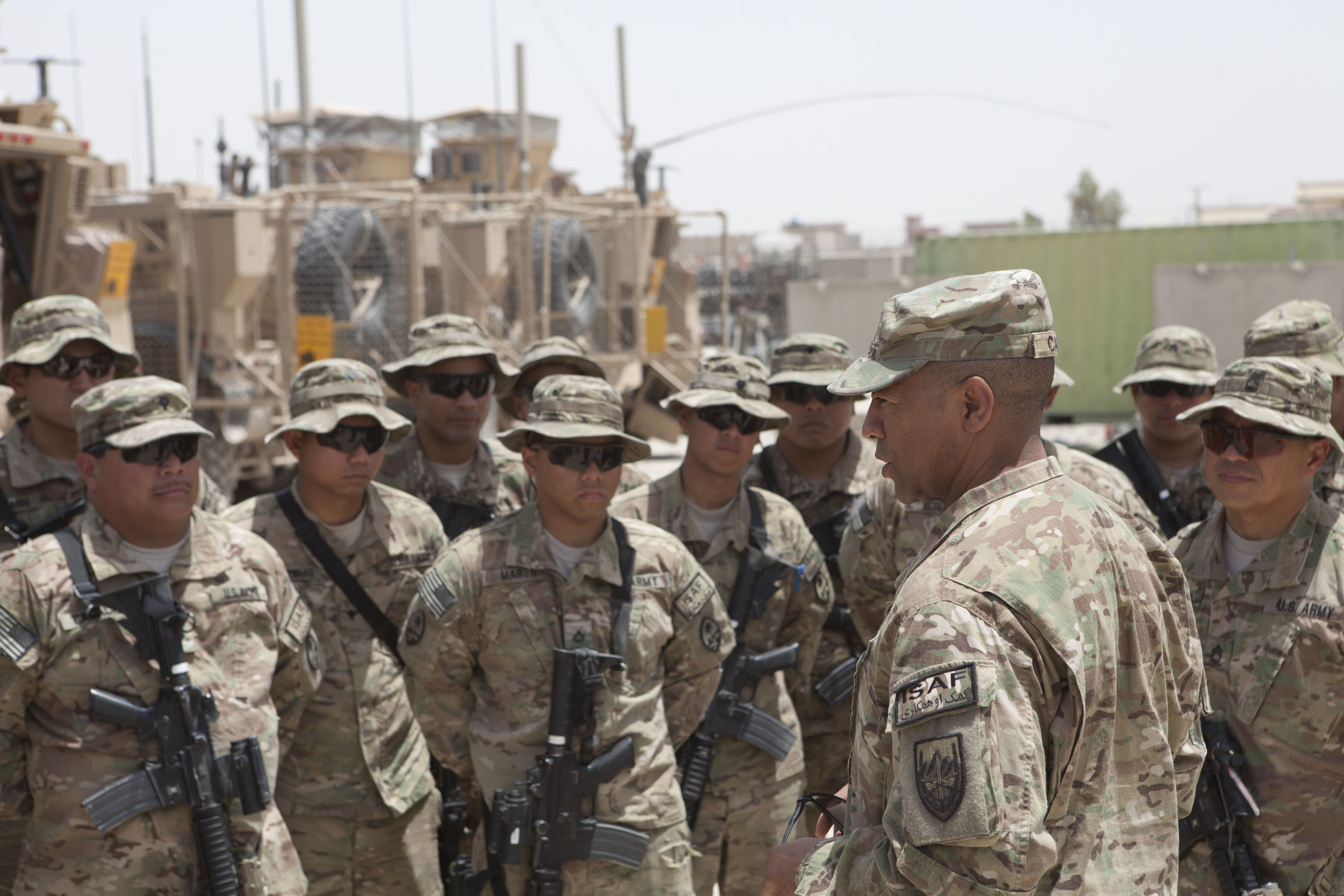
Guam Army National Guardsmen in Lashkar Gah, Afghanistan, May 2013

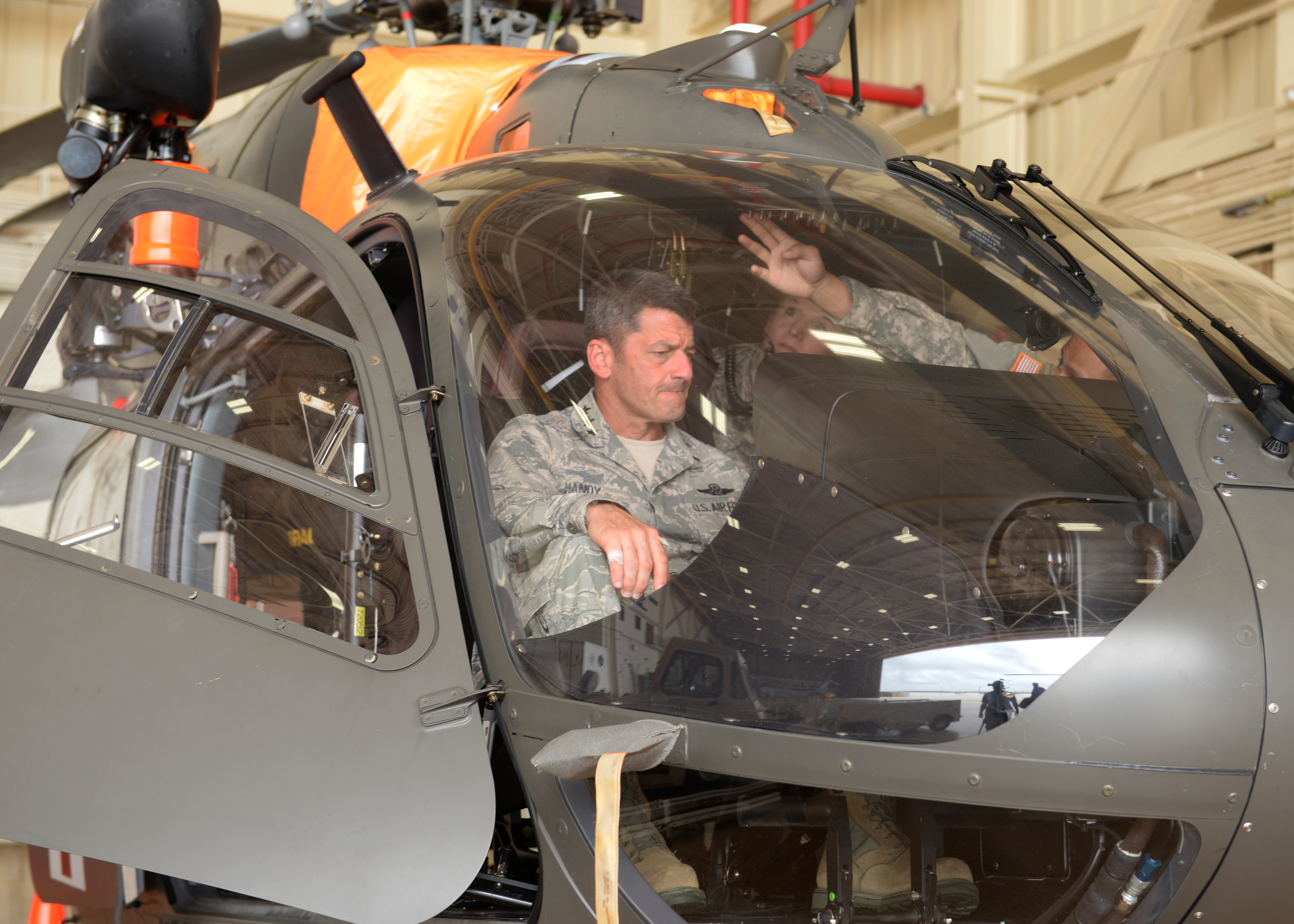
U.S. Air Force Lt. Gen. Russell Handy, 11th Air Force commander, tours a UH-72 Lakota of the Guam Army National Guard housed at Andersen Air Force Base

In 2002, members of the Guam Army National Guard's 1st Battalion, 294th Infantry Regiment and the 105th Troop Command were deployed to Afghanistan as a part of Operation Enduring Freedom. In October 2012, over 500 GU ARNG personnel formed Task Force Guam and trained at Camp Roberts, a California Army National Guard facility near Paso Robles, California prior to their deployment to Camp Phoenix near Kabul and other forward operating bases in Afghanistan. In April 2013, Task Force Guam replaced Task Force Centurion Prime, composed of 1st Battalion, 167th Infantry Regiment of the Alabama Army National Guard. Task Force Guam was the largest deployment in the history of GU ARNG and also included 17 soldiers who resided in the Northern Mariana Islands. Task Force Guam returned to Barrigada in December 2013 and was replaced in Afghanistan by Task Force Fury, composed of elements of the 508th Infantry Regiment, 82nd Airborne Division.

On June 10, 2015, the Guam Army National Guard gained its first aviation assets with the delivery of two UH-72 Lakota helicopters previously assigned to D Company, 1st Battalion, 224th Aviation Regiment, District of Columbia Army National Guard. The helicopters were delivered via a U.S. Air Force C-17 Globemaster II and transferred to the newly activated Detachment 2 within D Company. The aircraft are currently housed at Andersen Air Force Base and will eventually be based at a new complex to be built at the Guard Readiness Center in Barrigada.

As of January 2016, the Guam Army National Guard has about 1,300 members, with about 280 of them authorized as full-time support.

== Organization ==
As of February 2026 the Guam Army National Guard consists of the following units, which are all based in Barrigada:

- Guam Army National Guard
  - Joint Force Headquarters-Guam, Army Element, in Barrigada
    - Headquarters and Headquarters Detachment, Joint Force Headquarters-Guam, Army Element
    - Guam Recruiting & Retention Battalion
    - Guam Medical Detachment
    - Army Aviation Operations Facility #1, at Guam Airport
    - Combined Support Maintenance Shop #1
    - Field Maintenance Shop #1
    - 105th Troop Command
      - Headquarters and Headquarters Company, 105th Troop Command
      - 94th Civil Support Team (WMD)
      - 473rd Judge Advocate General Trial Defense Team
      - 721st Army Band
      - 1224th Engineer Company (Engineer Support Company)
      - Detachment 2, Company D (MEDEVAC), 1st Battalion (Security & Support), 224th Aviation Regiment, at Guam Airport (UH-72A Lakota)
      - Detachment 2, Company B, 1st Battalion (Security & Support), 376th Aviation Regiment, at Guam Airport (UH-72A Lakota)
      - 1st Battalion, 294th Infantry Regiment (part of 29th Infantry Brigade Combat Team)
        - Headquarters and Headquarters Company, 1st Battalion, 294th Infantry Regiment
          - Detachment 2, Headquarters and Headquarters Battery, 1st Battalion, 487th Field Artillery Regiment
        - Company A, 1st Battalion, 294th Infantry Regiment
        - Company B, 1st Battalion, 294th Infantry Regiment
        - Company C, 1st Battalion, 294th Infantry Regiment
        - Company D (Weapons), 1st Battalion, 294th Infantry Regiment
        - Company H (Forward Support), 29th Brigade Support Battalion
  - 203rd Regiment, Regional Training Institute
