= Uruno Beach =

- Uruno Beach Site
- U.S. National Register of Historic Places
- Location: Address restricted
- Nearest city: Dededo, Guam
- Area: 53.3 acres (21.6 ha)
- NRHP reference No.: 74002306
- Added to NRHP: December 27, 1974

Uruno Beach (also, Urunao Beach) is a private beach in the north of Guam. It is located southwest along the coast from Ritidian Point along unimproved gravel roads. Several resorts offer access to the beach for a price.

The vicinity contains the Uruno Beach Site, an archaeological site containing prehistoric cultural remains listed on the National Register of Historic Places in 1974. The site is on private property and not accessible to the public.
