= Okkodo High School =

Public high school in Dededo, Guam, United States

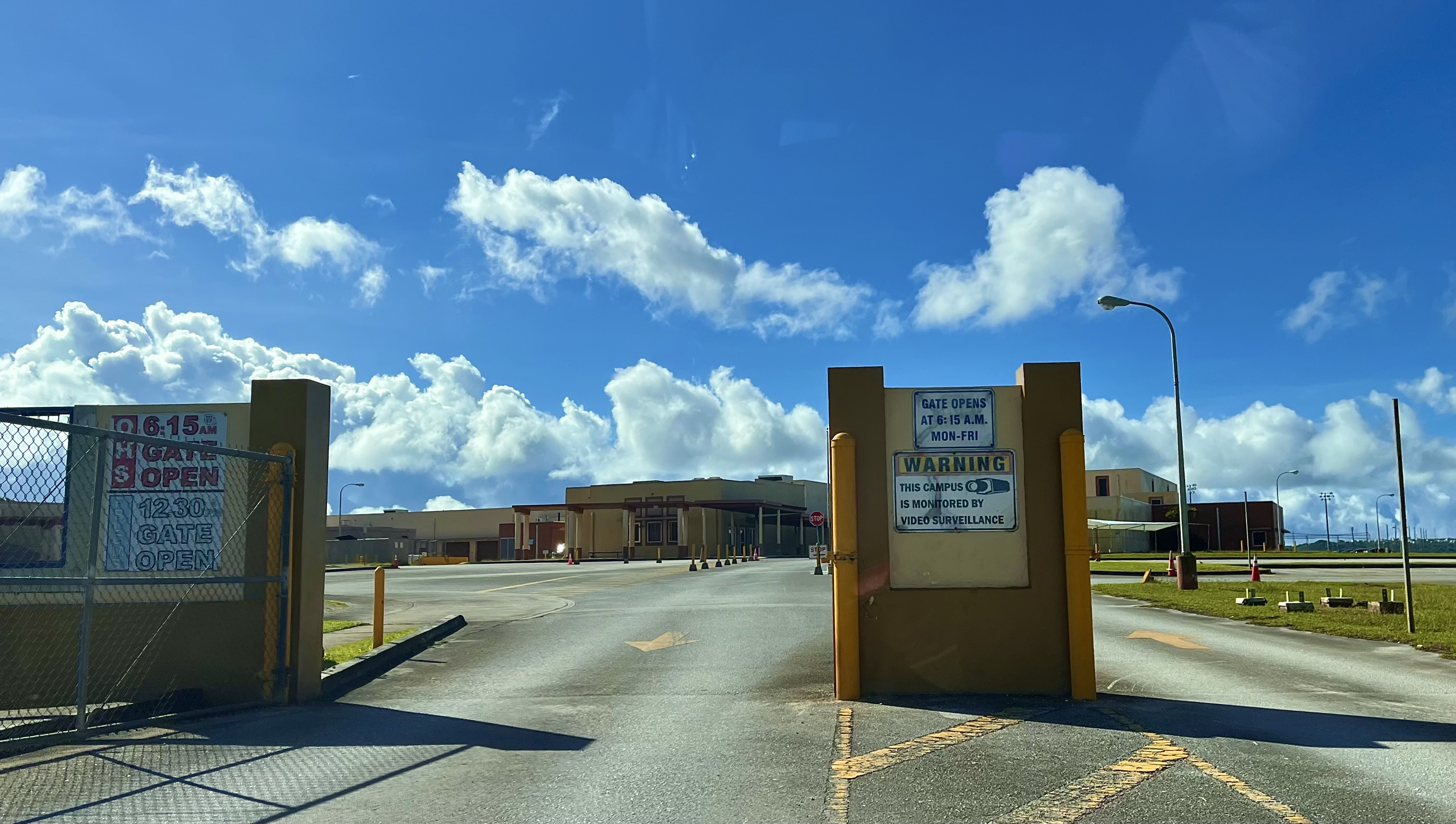

Location
- 660 Route 3 Dededo, Guam 96929; United States; 13.53479°N 144.83205°E

Information
- Type: Public secondary school
- Motto: "Excellence by Choice"
- Established: 2008
- School board: Guam Education Board
- School district: Guam Department of Education
- Superintendent: Erik Swanson
- Principal: Rita Flores
- Staff: 30
- Faculty: 85
- Employees: 115
- Grades: 9–12
- Enrollment: 1,500 (SY 2024-2025)
- Colors: Cardinal Red, Gray, and Navy Blue
- Athletics conference: Interscholastic Sports Association (ISA)
- Mascot: Bulldogs
- Accreditation: Western Association of Schools and Colleges
- Website: okkodohighschool.net

Okkodo High School (Chamorro: Ukudu Mina'takhelo na Eskuela) is a public high school located in Dededo in the United States territory of Guam. The school occupies 62 acres (25 ha) of the island's most populated village, Dededo. Okkodo High School opened its doors on August 21, 2008, making it the fifth public high school under the Guam Department of Education. The school's district encompasses the areas of Astumbo Gardens, Liguan Terrace, NCS/Munoz/Finegayan, Fern Terrace, Machanao, Santa Ana, Harmon Loop, and the surrounding Okkodo area. Okkodo High School is accredited by the Western Association of Schools and Colleges.

== Student life ==
=== Academics ===
In compliance with Guam Education Board policy, Okkodo High School students are required 24 credits and 75 hours of service learning in order to graduate. Students are given the opportunity to choose between a college path or a career path. Students under the college path are required to take 4 years of English, social studies, math, and science. Students in the career prep program are required to take a career and technical education or CTE program which are offered in the school through the Guam Community College. The school offers several honors and advanced placement (AP) courses, including:

- English 9 & 10 Honors
- Human Anatomy & Physiology Honors
- Pre-Calculus Honors
- Geometry Honors
- World Geography Honors
- Physics Honors
- Chemistry Honors
- Organic Chemistry Honors
- Biology Honors
- Marine Biology Honors
- Algebra II Honors
- Honors Select Chorus
- Band Honors
- AP United States History
- AP Calculus
- AP Statistics
- AP Government and Politics: United States
- AP English Literature and Composition
- AP English Language and Composition

Students at Okkodo High School compete in numerous academic competitions each year, including the Academic Challenge Bowl and Mock Trial.

=== Athletics ===
Okkodo High School participates in the GDOE Interscholastic Sports Association (ISA) sports for both boys and girls. The sports offered include basketball, volleyball, golf, tennis, baseball, paddling, football, cross country, rugby, track and field, and wrestling.

The school also has sports facilities that include fields and courts for softball, baseball, soccer, football, basketball, volleyball and tennis. The track and field area was recently renovated to include a concession stand, restrooms, and updated rubberized surface for the track. Along with providing for the needs of the school's athletic program, the campus hosts sports competitions for other public schools and for notable community events such as the Special Olympics Guam.

=== Marine Corps JROTC Program (MCJROTC) ===
At the start of SY 2009–2010, Okkodo High School started offering the Marine Corps Junior Reserve Training Corps Program to its student population, being the first and only MCJROTC program on island. The MCJROTC program provides students with skills in citizenship and leadership. The program motivates students to learn, fosters a disciplined constructive learning environment, and instills essential skills such as time organization, responsibility, goal-setting, and teamwork. In 2012, the Okkodo High School Junior Reserve Training Corps competed in the National High School Drill Team National Championship held in Daytona Beach, Florida and brought home 1st place for the regulation drill competition, 2nd place for best armed drill commander, and 5th place in open color guard division.

=== Guam Community College CTE Programs ===
Okkodo High School, in partnership with the Guam Community College, offers career and technical education programs that provide students with the knowledge and skills for entry in workforce or post-secondary college programs. The following are the offered CTE courses in OHS:

- Automotive Services
- Carpentry
- Electronics
- Marketing (DECA)
- Tourism (Lodging Management Program)
- Tourism (ProStart)

In May 2017, the Guam Community College's CTE ProStart team from Okkodo High School placed 2nd place in the 2017 National Restaurant Association Educational Foundation (NRAEF) ProStart National Competition in Charleston, South Carolina.

=== Freshmen Academy ===
In 2014, Okkodo High School started implementing the Freshmen Academy program. The program is intended to offer transition support for incoming freshmen and to provide them with a foundation for success. The expansion to the school facilities allows the freshmen to be apart from the rest of the school population. Classrooms and a dining area are designated for freshmen only. The students are divided into teams to increase support and monitoring from teachers. A Freshman Advisory Program (FAP) was implemented in 2014, as a component of the School-wide Intervention System (SIS).

=== Clubs and Organizations ===
There are currently 52 clubs and organizations offered to students as of SY 2025-2026:

- Student Body Association
- Senior Class of 2026
- Junior Class of 2027
- Sophomore Class of 2026
- Freshman Class of 2025
- Academic Challenge Bowl Club (ACB)
- Ambassador Club
- Animal Care Club
- Artified Club
- OHS Badminton Club
- Bookmarked Club
- Boys Basketball Club
- Boys Volleyball Club
- Close-Up Club
- DECA
- Dolce Primavera Choir
- Drama Club
- Electronics Club
- Fashion Club
- Filipino Student Association
- Girls Basketball Club
- Girls Soccer Club
- Girls Softball Club
- Girls Volleyball Club
- H.O.P².E Club
- HOSTS Club
- How Young People Entertain (HYPE)
- Hygiene, Empowerment, Access, Life Club (HEAL)
- Lemon-Aid Club
- Lend Earth a Friend Club (LEAF)
- Magnifico!
- MCJROTC
- Mock Trial and Debate Club
- Mu Alpha Theta: Mathematics Honor Society
- National English Honor Society (NEHS)
- National Honor Society (NHS)
- National Technical Honor Society (NTHS)
- OHS Oncology Club
- OHS Outrigger Paddling Club
- Paw Print Club
- PROSTART
- PSYCH!
- Rugby Club
- Running Club
- School-to-Work Club
- Students Helping Students (SHS)
- SPARKS
- Tennis Club
- Tri-M Music Honor Society
- United Nesians of Okkodo (UNO)
- Wrestling Club
- Yearbook Club

== History ==
The $78M construction of the four new Guam schools were initiated by Iron Bridge Capital in October 2006. The school constructions built a total of 326,650 square feet of 148 classrooms, laboratories, storage areas, and many more. For the Okkodo High School project, a 12,744 square feet high school gymnasium, built with a synthetic floor system, motorized basketball goals, and stacking bleachers, and state-of-the-art sports facilities were built to accommodate athletic events, including IIAAG middle school and high school games. All four projects were ahead of schedule and were ready for SY 2008–2009.

Situated along Route 3, the school is named after the area in which it is built. "Okkodo" is Chamorro for the word "trap". It was also the name of a Chamorro chief who resided in the village of Dededo.

The school opened its doors on August 24, 2008, serving students in the 9th, 10th, 11th, and 12th grades. Mr. Kenneth Denusta was the first principal of the high school. Upon its opening, Okkodo High School had 1,500 students, 300 students more than originally intended. In December 2008, the principal stated that a riot that had occurred would "tarnish the image of this school."

In early 2012, Okkodo High School earned a three-year accreditation after a first full-visit by the Western Association of Schools and Colleges. In 2015, the school once again gained another three-year accreditation from W.A.S.C.

In July 2014, a $21.8M expansion project, now known as the Freshmen Academy, increased the high school's student capacity from 1,200 to 2,000 students, adding 800 more students from its current capacity. This project adds 23 standard classrooms, 7 science labs, an Electronics lab, a Drama lab, 4 Special Education resource classrooms, and more. This annex facility is currently being utilized by the 9th grade population of the school. The girls' locker room was expanded and an additional boy's locker room was constructed. The existing boys and girls locker rooms were expanded. The final part of the expansion included a culinary arts classroom and laboratory that was constructed adjacent to the original facilities. The Culinary Arts building include a commercial grade kitchen for the Guam Community College staff to teach and train the Okkodo High School students on the culinary arts subject. The Culinary Arts facility has a training kitchen where students learn and prepare meals, and a separate dining area where students will enjoy their culinary creations.
