= Guam National Guard =

United States military unit in Guam

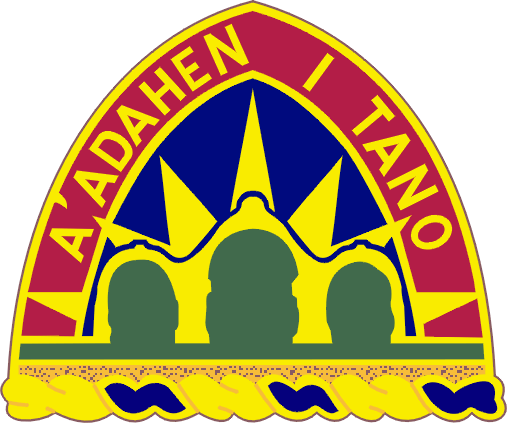
- Guam National Guard DUI
- Founded: 1917
- Country: United States
- Allegiance: Guam
- Branch: United States Army; United States Air Force
- Type: Joint
- Role: United States Army National Guard; United States Air National Guard
- Garrison/HQ: 430 Army Drive, Building 350, Barrigada
- Motto: Where America's Day Begins

Commanders
- Commander-in-Chief: President Donald Trump
- Governor of Guam: Lou Leon Guerrero
- Adjutant General: Brigadier General Karin L. Watson

Insignia
- Shoulder sleeve insignia of the Guam Army National Guard

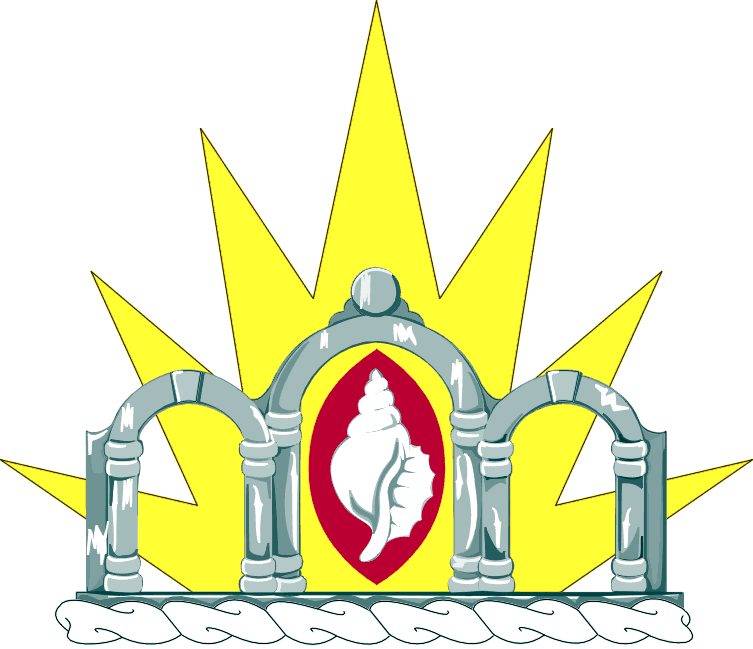
- Regimental crest of the Guam Army National Guard

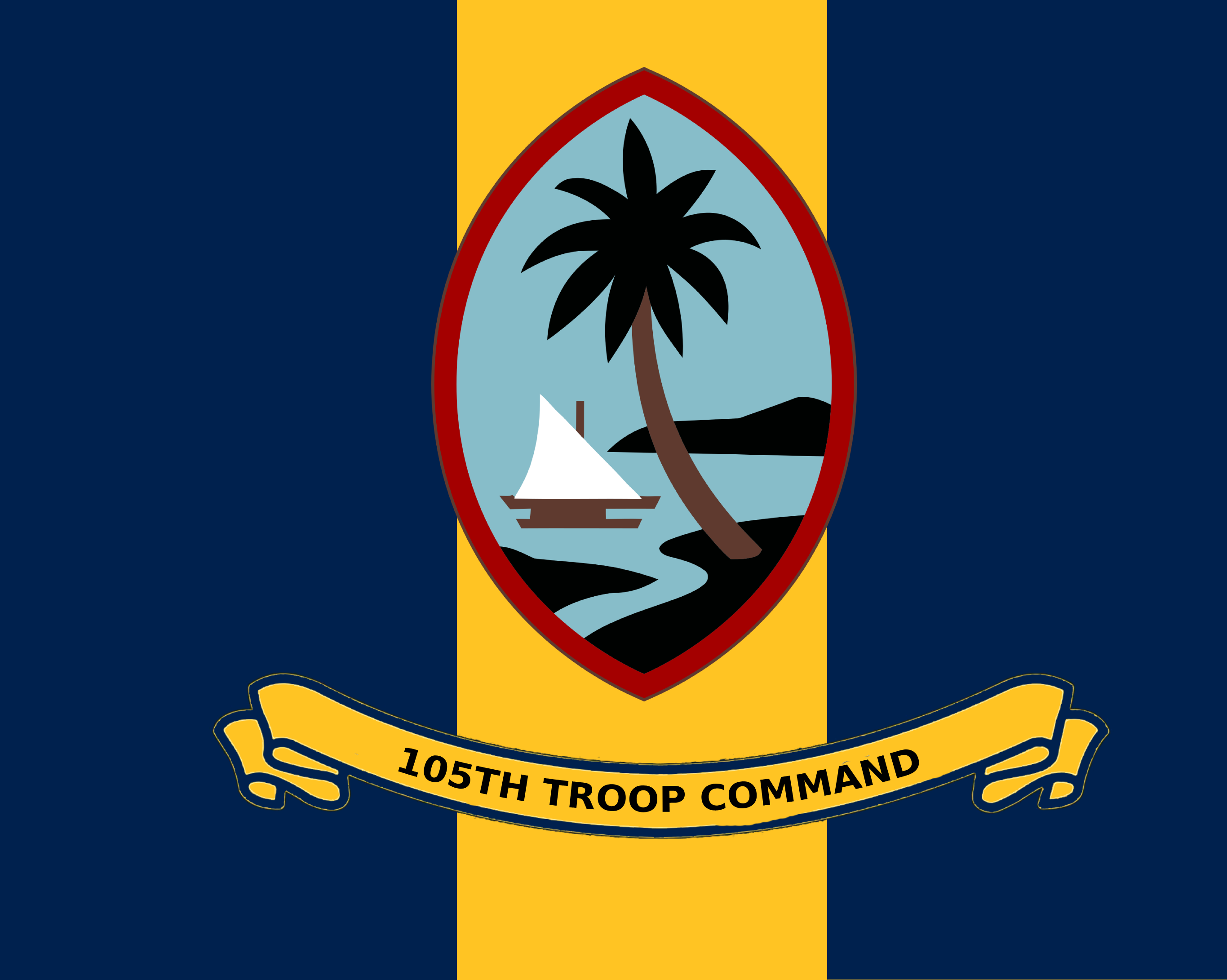
- Flag of the 105th Troop Command Guam ARNG

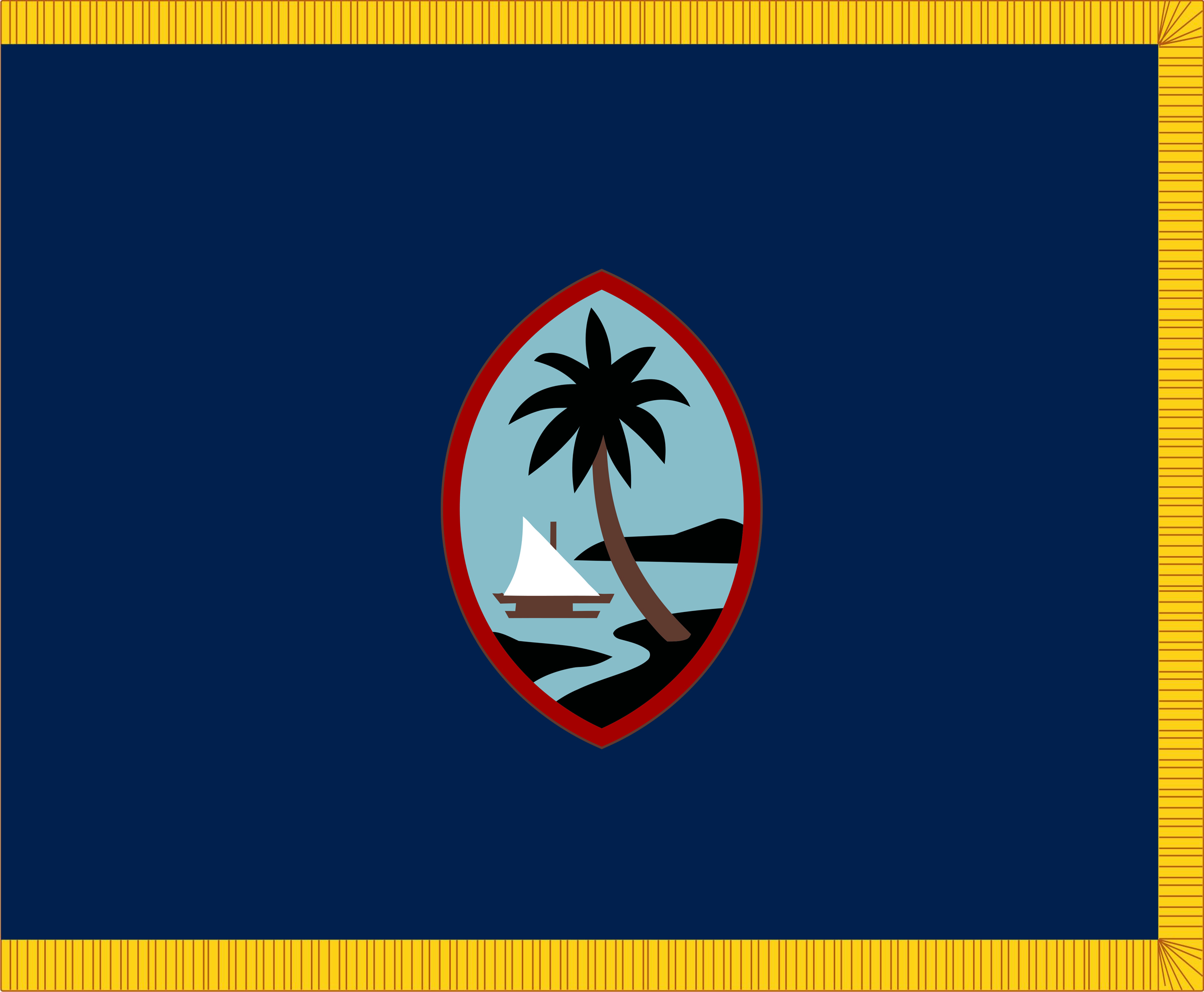
- Flag of the Guam Army National Guard

The Guam National Guard is the National Guard in the United States territory of Guam, made up of the Guam Army National Guard and the Guam Air National Guard.

== History ==
The National Guard of the Island of Guam can be traced back to the first military organization on the island known as the Guam Militia. The Guam Militia was first organized by Governor Mariano Tobias during the Spanish colonial period on Guam in 1771 but was disbanded in 1885. It was later reestablished on March 25, 1917, under U.S. Naval governor Roy C. Smith because island residents requested more physical and military training be required of their younger male population. Thus, it became mandatory for males, 18 years or older, to attend drills on Sundays from 8 a.m. to 11:30 pm. at the Plaza de Espana in Hagatna. As a quasi-military force, the unit members were neither compensated nor provided with uniforms and equipment. However after World War I salvage operations on the scuttled SMS Cormoran led to recovered Mauser rifles being issued to the militia before they were replaced with newer weapons in 1921.

The Guam Militia grew to as many as 1,750 members, consisting of 77 officers and 1,674 enlisted men, by March 1, 1935 and was later reorganized into a voluntary military force.

On December 10, 1941, U.S. Naval governor Captain George J. McMillin conceded to the Imperial Japanese Army who forced the Militia to become inactive; however, it was never disbanded. During the Japanese occupation of Guam, the Imperial Japanese Forces subjected the island natives, Chamorros, to death, torture and enslavement over the next two and a half years.

The U.S. Marines’ recapture of Guam on July 21, 1944 liberated the Chamorro people and returned full ownership of the island to the United States. Guam is the only U.S. possession, with a sizable population, to ever be controlled by a foreign government for a significant period of time.

By December 11, 1950, Governor Carlton Skinner had the Guam Militia reconstituted as a voluntary force commanded by Colonel Juan Muna, whose name is still used to day for the Guard’s main headquarters, Fort Juan Muna. Militiamen Tomas R. Santos and Joaquin Charfauros, members of the original pre-World War II Guam Militia, were appointed as honorary Generals of the Guam National Guard. The Guam Militia was legally deactivated in 1956 after the 4th Guam Legislature passed Public Law 23 to provide the necessary basis toward establishing a National Guard for the island of Guam. Congressman Antonio A.B. Won Pat and Governor Ricardo J. Bordallo made significant contributions to the Guam Guard through their negotiations with the U.S. Congress and the National Guard Bureau to establish a Guard structure for Guam.

On December 24, 1980, President Jimmy Carter signed Public Law 96-600 introduced by the 96th United States Congress authorizing the establishment of the Guam National Guard. Governor Paul M. Calvo served as the first Commander-In- Chief and Brigadier General Robert H. Neitz was appointed as the first Adjutant General. On July 21, 1981, the Guam National Guard’s Command headquarters was officially established with 32 original charter members. The organization’s personnel strength has grown to over 1,700 members between its Army and Air Guard commands. In 1982, the Guam Militia was also legally reestablished as Guam's non-federal state defense force, separate from the Guam National Guard, but is currently inactive.

In 2002, members of the Guam Army National Guard were deployed to participate in Operation Enduring Freedom.

== Units ==
Guam Army National Guard
Key components of the Guam ARNG include the 1st Battalion, 294th Infantry Regiment, and the 105th Troop Command, consisting of two quartermaster detachments, a military intelligence detachment and an engineer detachment.

Guam Air National Guard
Currently, the Guam Air National Guard consists of a single, non-flying unit, the 254th Air Base Group. The main goal of the Guam Air Guard is to provide ready forces to the governor of Guam during emergencies, civil crises, and for civil support, as well as to augment and assist the active duty military located at Guam. If activated to federal service, the 254th Air Base Group is gained by the Pacific Air Forces.

== See also ==
- Guam Air National Guard
- Guam Army National Guard
