= Pago =

Pago may refer to:

== Places ==
- the Italian name for Pag (island), off the coast of Croatia
  - Pag (town), on the island
- Pago (Papua New Guinea), a volcano in Papua New Guinea
- Pago (American Samoa), an ancient volcano in American Samoa
- Pago, a historical community on Pago Bay, Guam
- Pago Bay, on Guam
- Pago River, a river on Guam
- Pago Pago, the territorial capital of American Samoa, on the main island Tutuila
- Pago Pago Harbor in American Samoa
- Pago del Vallo di Lauro, a town and comune in the province of Avellino, Campania, Italy.
- Pago Veiano, a comune in the Province of Benevento in the Italian region Campania

== Other uses ==
- Pago International, juice manufacturer
- pago, the Chamorro word for Hibiscus tiliaceus

== See also ==
- Bago, Burma, a regional capital; formerly named Pegu and Hanthawaddy
- Chalan Pago-Ordot, Guam, a municipality
- Vino de Pago, a classification for Spanish wine
