= Ordot Dump =

Former landfill on the Pacific island of Guam

- Superfund site
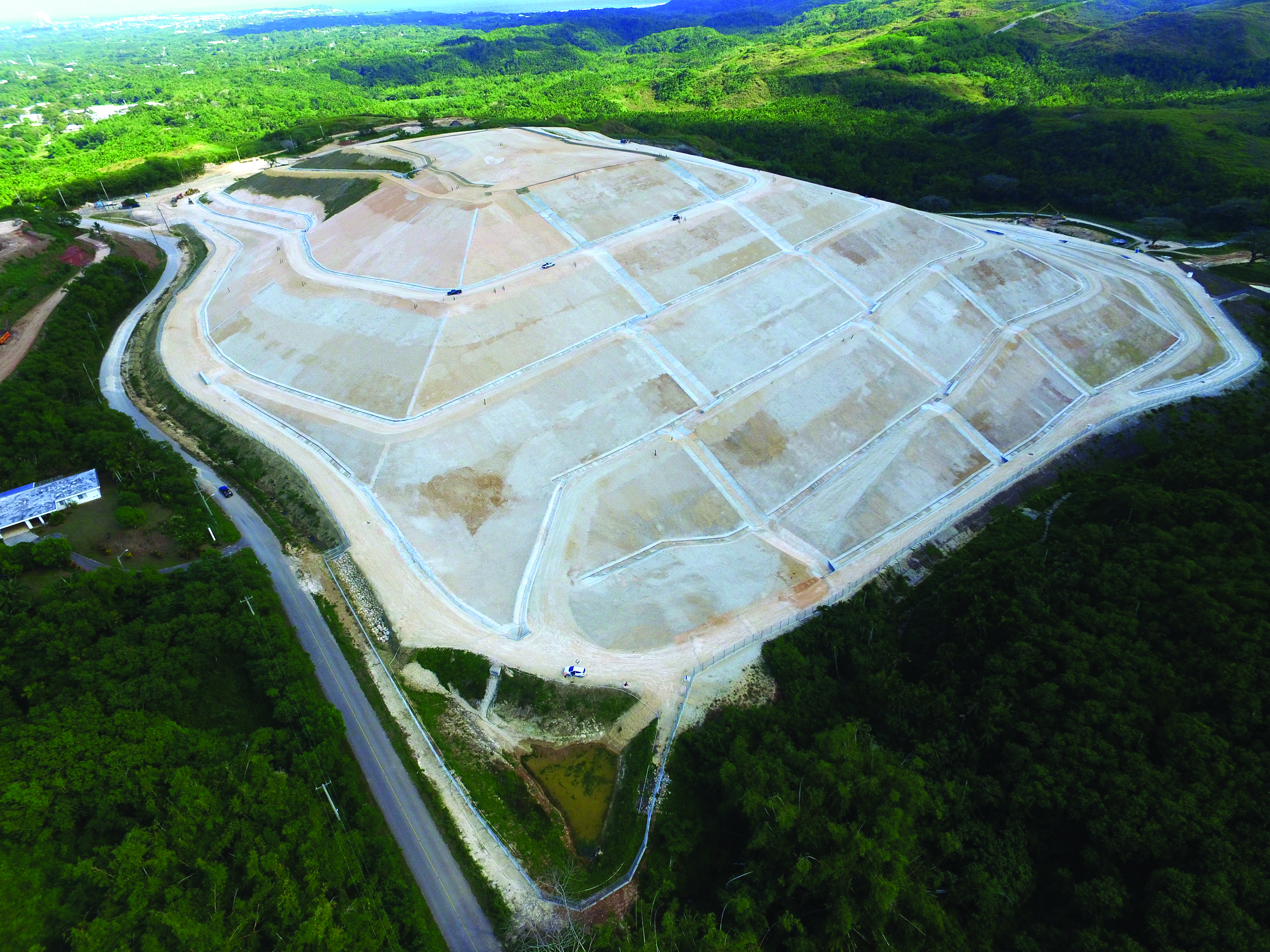
- Ordot Dump in 2016, looking northeast with the Lonfit River to the right

- Location within Guam
- Location: Ordot, Chalan Pago-Ordot, Guam; 13.4389°N 144.7504°E

Information
- CERCLIS ID: GUD980637649
- Contaminants: Hazardous waste landfill leachate

Progress
- Proposed: 20 December 1982
- Listed: 8 September 1983
- Construction completed: 9 September 1992

Ordot Dump, also known as Ordot Landfill, was a landfill on the western Pacific island of Guam that operated from the 1940s until 2011. Originally operated by the U.S. military, ownership was transferred to the Government of Guam in 1950, though it continued to receive all waste on the island, including from Naval Base Guam and Andersen Air Force Base, through the 1970s.

The Environmental Protection Agency (EPA) designated Ordot Dump a Superfund site in 1983. In 2002, the U.S. government sued Guam under the Clean Water Act to force it to clean up Ordot Dump, resulting in Guam entering into a consent decree to close and cover the dump. After Guam failed to do so, the EPA put the landfill into receivership. The receiver closed Ordot Dump in 2011.

In 2017, Guam sued the U.S. government for part of the costs of cleaning up the dump, which were estimated to range as high as $160 million. The Federal government argued that the statute of limitations had already run out for Guam to file suit. The Supreme Court of the United States heard the case, Guam v. United States, and decided unanimously in May 2021 to allow Guam's case to continue.

== Geography and geology ==
Ordot Dump comprises 63 acres (25 ha) in the community of Ordot in the village municipality of Chalan Pago-Ordot. It lies about 2.5 miles (4 km) south of Guam's capital Hagåtña and about 1 mile (1.6 km) southwest of the intersection of Guam Highway 4 and Dero Drive.

The landfill is located in the upland at the divide between the southern volcanic and northern limestone geologic provinces. A 1988 EPA report noted that a suspected geologic fault under the landfill may provide a connection to the primary aquifer providing drinking water for Guam. The dump is located in a ravine that is a tributary to the Lonfit River, which itself feeds into the Pago River, which empties into Pago Bay on Guam's eastern coast with the Pacific Ocean. The soil underlying the landfill is very fine-grained volcanic sediment with high clay content. Its low levels of permeability may explain the lack of evidence for bacteria and heavy metals migrating into the soil. The midpoint of the landfill is a peak of approximately 90 metres (300 ft).

== History ==
It is unknown when the site was first used for waste disposal, but it was in use prior to World War II. During the Japanese occupation of Guam, it continued to be used for disposal. Following the Second Battle of Guam, the U.S. Navy had absolute control over Guam and created the sole landfill on the island at Ordot Dump, with an unlined bottom and uncapped top. As part of the Guam Organic Act of 1950, the United States unilaterally transferred Ordot Dump to the Government of Guam (GovGuam) to operate as a municipal landfill. However, the Navy continued to use the Ordot Dump through the Korean and Vietnam Wars. In the 1970s, with the creation of military landfill options, it became solely a civilian landfill and remained the only public landfill on Guam until its closure in 2011.

There are multiple anecdotes that the site was used to dump polychlorinated biphenyl (PCB)-containing wastes, pesticides and military ordnance, but there is no confirming documentation. It is considered common knowledge on Guam that both Japanese and U.S. forces placed unexploded ordnance (UXO) in the dump, in particular during World War II, with multiple anecdotes of explosions at the landfill sometimes causing fires. However, there are no records of serious injuries resulting from these explosions. Based on the history of the site, it is believed that any remaining UXO would be located in the northwest corner of the existing landfill. There have been many fires at the landfill; since 1990, there has been an average of a fire every two years. The only substantial documentation of these fires is of a 1998 tire fire that continued burning underground and was largely left to burn itself out. The Legislature of Guam appropriated $250,000 to cover the costs of fire at the landfill that occurred on 25 October 2002. The nearby residents of Chalan Pago-Ordot protested the presence of the dump, which forced evacuations when subsurface fires emerged, gave off a bad smell particularly after heavy rains, contaminated the nearby Lonfit River, and sustained a large number of flies that occupied the nearby area.

Following the enactment of the Comprehensive Environmental Response, Compensation, and Liability Act of 1980 (CERCLA), the Governor of Guam designated Ordot Dump as Guam's highest priority for Superfund clean-up. It was then included on the initial National Priorities List that was finalized on 8 September 1983. On 26 March 1986, the United States Environmental Protection Agency found Ordot Landfill in violation of the Clean Water Act because of discharge of landfill leachate into the Lonfit River without a National Pollution Discharge Elimination System permit, and ordered the Dump to cease discharges. In its final Record of Decision, the EPA noted as potentially responsible parties for the contamination as the U.S. Navy, GovGuam, and the Department of Public Works, among other reported landfill users. In response to continued discharge of leachate, on 24 July 1990 the EPA ordered the Guam Department of Public Works to cease the discharge from the Dump. In 2002 the Federal government sought to require GovGuam to pay for the cleanup, rather than use Federal Superfund money, though GovGuam continued to insist that they could not afford the cost of a cleanup. On 11 February 2004, after continued discharge in violation of the Clean Water Act, the District Court of Guam issued a Consent Decree in which GovGuam agreed to cease the discharge of pollutants from Ordot Dump, close Ordot Dump within 45 months, begin implementing a post-closure plan, and obtain permits for and begin operating a new municipal sanitary waste landfill within 44 months. As part of the settlement, the Consent Decree stated that it was entered into "without any finding or admission of liability against or by the Government of Guam." On 17 March 2008, the District Court, noting the lack of progress in implementing the 2004 Consent Decree, appointed as Federal Receiver the company Gershmann, Brickner & Bratton, Inc. (GBB) to manage and supervise Guam's Solid Waste Management Division and achieve compliance with the Consent Decree. On 31 August 2011, Ordot Dump was closed and its role taken by the newly constructed Layon Landfill in Inalåhan, which began operation on 1 September 2011.

=== Guam v. United States ===
Estimating that the cost of cleaning Ordot Dump could run as high as $160 million, Guam sued the Navy in Guam v. United States in 2017 for part of the cleanup costs, per it being listed as a potentially responsible party under CERCLA Section 107(a) or, alternatively, under CERCLA Section 113(f)(3)(B) for "liability to the United States or a State for some or all of a response action or for some or all of the costs of such action in a […] judicially approved settlement agreement." The United States Court of Appeals for the District of Columbia Circuit ruled that only the Section 113(f)(3)(B) action could apply to the case, but that a three-year statute of limitations had been triggered by the 2004 Consent Decree related to violations of the Clean Water Act and that therefore Guam could not sue the Navy. The DC Circuit Court of Appeals noted that the ruling was "harsh" as the Navy had "deposited dangerous munitions and chemicals at the Ordot Dump for decades and left Guam to foot the bill."

The case went to the Supreme Court of the United States in 2021. An amicus brief in support of Guam was filed by the attorneys general of 24 states, the District of Columbia, and the Northern Mariana Islands. SCOTUSblog called the amicus brief "extraordinary" as "the states are evenly divided between red states and blue states and large states and small states, from all regions of the nation." The attorneys general maintained that only settlements explicitly linked to CERCLA could start the CERCLA Section 113(f)(3)(B)'s statute of limitations clock and that the DC Circuit Court ruling would allow the U.S. military to evade responsibility for its many contaminated military bases around the nation.

In a unanimous decision, the Supreme Court on 24 May 2021 ruled with Guam. In the opinion for the Court, Justice Clarence Thomas rejected the Navy's argument and agreed with Guam that only a settlement of CERCLA-specific liability could trigger the CERCLA Section 113(f)(3)(B) statute of limitations. Thomas noted that, while CERCLA and other environmental statutes may have functionally similar steps, "relying on that functional overlap to reinterpret the phrase 'resolved its liability … for some or all of a response action' to mean 'settled an environmental liability that might have been actionable under CERCLA' would stretch the statute beyond Congress' actual language." Guam was thus allowed to proceed with its action seeking Navy contribution to the cost of the Ordot Landfill cleanup.

== See also ==
- List of Superfund sites in Guam
