= 2015–16 Ligue 1 =

78th season of top-tier French football

Ligue 1
- Season: 2015–16
- Dates: 7 August 2015 – 14 May 2016
- Champions: Paris Saint-Germain; 6th Ligue 1 title 6th French title
- Relegated: Troyes; Gazélec Ajaccio; Reims
- Champions League: Paris Saint-Germain; Lyon; Monaco
- Europa League: Nice; Lille; Saint-Étienne
- Matches: 380
- Goals: 960 (2.53 per match)
- Top goalscorer: Zlatan Ibrahimović (38 goals)
- Biggest home win: Marseille 6–0 Troyes (23 August 2015); Paris Saint-Germain 6–0 Caen (16 September 2016)
- Biggest away win: Troyes 0–9 Paris Saint-Germain (13 March 2016)
- Highest scoring: Troyes 0–9 Paris Saint-Germain (13 March 2016)
- Longest winning run: 9 matches Paris Saint-Germain
- Longest unbeaten run: 27 matches Paris Saint-Germain
- Longest winless run: 21 matches Troyes
- Longest losing run: 6 matches Reims
- Highest attendance: 63,235; Marseille 1–2 Paris Saint-Germain (8 February 2016)
- Lowest attendance: 3,465; Gazélec Ajaccio 2–2 Toulouse (3 October 2015)
- Total attendance: 7,920,621
- Average attendance: 20,560

The 2015–16 Ligue 1 season was the 78th season of the Ligue de Football Professionnel first division since its establishment. It started on 7 August 2015 and concluded on 14 May 2016. Paris Saint-Germain were the defending champions, and retained the title with a 9–0 win at Troyes on 13 March. It was their fourth consecutive Ligue 1 title.

== Teams ==
There were 20 clubs in the league, with three promoted teams from Ligue 2 replacing the three teams that were relegated from Ligue 1 following the 2014–15 season. All clubs that secured Ligue 1 status for the season were subject to approval by the DNCG before becoming eligible to participate. Originally, only two teams were planned to be relegated at the end of the season. However, this proposal was appealed and eventually overturned, so as in past seasons, three teams are to be relegated. Evian, Metz and Lens were relegated to Ligue 2 at the conclusion of the 2014–15 season. Troyes, Gazelec Ajaccio and Angers were promoted to the top level. Troyes returned after being relegated in 2012–13 season. Gazelec Ajaccio secured their second consecutive promotion and joined Ligue 1 for the first time in the club's history. Angers returned to the top level after 21 years.

=== Stadia and locations ===
Location of teams in 2015–16 Ligue 1

| Club | Location | Venue | Capacity |
|---|---|---|---|
| Angers | Angers | Stade Jean Bouin | 17,835 |
| Bastia | Bastia | Stade Armand Cesari | 16,480 |
| Bordeaux | Bordeaux | Matmut Atlantique | 42,115 |
| Caen | Caen | Stade Michel d'Ornano | 21,215 |
| Gazélec Ajaccio | Ajaccio | Stade Ange Casanova | 6,000 |
| Guingamp | Guingamp | Stade du Roudourou | 18,126 |
| Lille | Villeneuve-d'Ascq | Stade Pierre-Mauroy | 50,186 |
| Lorient | Lorient | Stade du Moustoir | 18,890 |
| Lyon | Lyon | Stade de Gerland (fall 2015); Parc Olympique Lyonnais (spring 2016) | 41,842; 59,186 |
| Marseille | Marseille | Stade Vélodrome (revamped for Euro 2016) | 67,000 |
| Monaco | Monaco | Stade Louis II | 18,500 |
| Montpellier | Montpellier | Stade de la Mosson | 32,939 |
| Nantes | Nantes | Stade de la Beaujoire | 38,285 |
| Nice | Nice | Allianz Riviera | 35,624 |
| Paris Saint-Germain | Paris | Parc des Princes | 48,712 |
| Reims | Reims | Stade Auguste Delaune | 21,684 |
| Rennes | Rennes | Roazhon Park | 29,376 |
| Saint-Étienne | Saint-Étienne | Stade Geoffroy-Guichard | 42,000 |
| Toulouse | Toulouse | Stadium Municipal | 35,470 |
| Troyes | Troyes | Stade de l'Aube | 21,684 |

=== Personnel and kits ===
| Team | Manager | Captain | Kit Manufacturer | Shirt sponsors (front) | Shirt sponsors (back) | Shirt sponsors (sleeve) | Shorts sponsors |
|---|---|---|---|---|---|---|---|
| Angers | (France) Stéphane Moulin | (France) Olivier Auriac | Kappa | Scania (H)/Bodet (A), L'Atoll Angers, Brioche Pasquier, Angers | La Boucherie | Algimouss | Système U, babygro |
| Bastia | (France) François Ciccolini | (France) Yannick Cahuzac | Kappa | Oscaro, Collectivité Territoriale de Corse, Corsica Ferries, AM Environnement, Ford | Pago | Certifoot.com, Haute-Corse | Orezza, Kontakt |
| Bordeaux | (France) Ulrich Ramé | (Senegal) Ludovic Sané | Puma | Kia | Yezz | Groupe Pichet | Winamax |
| Caen | (France) Patrice Garande | (France) Julien Féret | Nike | Campagne de France (H)/Maisons France Confort (A & 3), Groupe IDEC, Künkel, Petit Forestier | Wati B | Guy Dauphin Environnement | Wati B |
| Gazélec Ajaccio | (France) Thierry Laurey | (France) Louis Poggi | Macron | Carrefour, Casino d'Ajaccio, Collectivité Territoriale de Corse, Foxy Auto, NetBet | Département Corse-du-Sud | Corsea Promotion | Banette Boulanger, Air Corsica |
| Guingamp | (France) Jocelyn Gourvennec | (France) Lionel Mathis | Patrick | Celtigel, Société ADS, Breizh Cola | Mère Lalie | Celtarmor | BRIEUC biscuiterie, caramelerie, confiturerie |
| Lille | (France) Frédéric Antonetti | (France) Rio Mavuba | Nike | Partouche, etixx | Vacansoleil | Godin | No Publik |
| Lorient | (France) Sylvain Ripoll | (France) Yann Jouffre | Adidas | B&B Hotels (H)/Jean Floc'h (A), Jean Floc'h (H)/B&B Hotels (A), Breizh Cola | Salaün Holidays | Virage Conseil | Lorient Agglomération |
| Lyon | (France) Bruno Génésio | (France) Maxime Gonalons | Adidas | Hyundai/Veolia (in UEFA matches), Cegid, MDA Electroménager | Intermarché | 24Option.com | Oknoplast |
| Marseille | (France) Franck Passi | (France) Steve Mandanda | Adidas | Intersport | Turkish Airlines | Mutuelles du Soleil | Winamax |
| Monaco | (Portugal) Leonardo Jardim | (France) Jérémy Toulalan | Nike | Fedcom, Alain Afflelou | Alain Afflelou | Triangle Intérim | Orezza |
| Montpellier | (France) Frédéric Hantz | (Brazil) Vitorino Hilton | Nike | Sud de France, Dyneff Gaz, Montpellier Métropole, Mutuelles du Soleil | La Région Languedoc-Roussillon | FAUN-Environnement | Système U, Wati B |
| Nantes | (Armenia) Michel Der Zakarian | (Venezuela) Oswaldo Vizcarrondo | Umbro | Synergie, Système U, Proginov | Anvolia | None | Winamax, etixx |
| Nice | (France) Claude Puel | (France) Nampalys Mendy | Burrda | Mutuelles du Soleil, Métropole Nice Côte d'Azur, Ville de Nice | Pizzorno Environnement | Nice Start(s) Up (H)/interactive-option.com (T) | Winamax |
| Paris Saint-Germain | (France) Laurent Blanc | (Brazil) Thiago Silva | Nike | Fly Emirates | Ooredoo | QNB | None |
| Reims | (France) David Guion | (Algeria) Aïssa Mandi | Hummel | Sanei Ascenseurs, Geodis, Transports Caillot | SOS Malus | Certifoot.com, Reims Métropole (H)/Reims (A) | None |
| Rennes | (France) Rolland Courbis | (France) Romain Danzé | Puma | Samsic, Del Arte, Armor-Lux, Association ELA | Blot Immobilier | rennes.fr | Bretagne Structures |
| Saint-Étienne | (France) Christophe Galtier | (France) Loïc Perrin | Le Coq Sportif | EoviMcd Mutuelle, Loire | BewellConnect | MARKAL | Desjoyaux Piscines |
| Toulouse | (France) Pascal Dupraz | (Ivory Coast) Jean-Daniel Akpa Akpro | Joma | Triangle Intérim, Natur House, LP Promotion | Newrest | Prévoir Assurances | So Toulouse |
| Troyes | (Algeria) Mohamed Bradja | (France) Benjamin Nivet | Kappa | Babeau Seguin, First Securite Events, Intermarché, Festilight | Premium Automobiles | None | Troyes |

=== Managerial changes ===
| Team | Outgoing manager | Manner of departure | Date of vacancy | Position in table | Incoming manager | Date of appointment |
|---|---|---|---|---|---|---|
| Lille | (France) René Girard | Mutual consent | 24 May 2015 | Pre-season | (France) Hervé Renard | 25 May 2015 |
| Marseille | (Argentina) Marcelo Bielsa | Resigned | 8 August 2015 | 19th | (Spain) Míchel | 19 August 2015 |
| Lille | (France) Hervé Renard | Mutual consent | 11 November 2015 | 16th | (France) Frédéric Antonetti | 22 November 2015 |
| Troyes | (France) Jean-Marc Furlan | Mutual consent | 3 December 2015 | 20th | (France) Claude Robin | 8 December 2015 |
| Montpellier | (France) Rolland Courbis | Resigned | 23 December 2015 | 15th | (France) Frédéric Hantz | 27 December 2015 |
| Lyon | (France) Hubert Fournier | Sacked | 24 December 2015 | 9th | (France) Bruno Génésio | 24 December 2015 |
| Rennes | (France) Philippe Montanier | Sacked | 20 January 2016 | 6th | (France) Rolland Courbis | 21 January 2016 |
| Bastia | (France) Ghislain Printant | Sacked | 28 January 2016 | 15th | (France) François Ciccolini | 29 January 2016 |
| Troyes | (France) Claude Robin | Sacked | 4 February 2016 | 20th | (Algeria) Mohamed Bradja | 5 February 2016 |
| Toulouse | (France) Dominique Arribagé | Resigned | 27 February 2016 | 19th | (France) Pascal Dupraz | 2 March 2016 |
| Bordeaux | (France) Willy Sagnol | Sacked | 14 March 2016 | 14th | (France) Ulrich Ramé | 14 March 2016 |
| Marseille | (Spain) Míchel | Sacked | 19 April 2016 | 15th | (France) Franck Passi (caretaker) | 19 April 2016 |
| Reims | (France) Olivier Guégan | Sacked | 23 April 2016 | 17th | (France) David Guion (caretaker) | 23 April 2016 |

== League table ==
| Pos | Team | Pld | W | D | L | GF | GA | GD | Pts | Qualification or relegation |
|---|---|---|---|---|---|---|---|---|---|---|
| 1 | Paris Saint-Germain (C) | 38 | 30 | 6 | 2 | 102 | 19 | +83 | 96 | Qualification for the Champions League group stage |
| 2 | Lyon | 38 | 19 | 8 | 11 | 67 | 43 | +24 | 65 | Qualification for the Champions League group stage |
| 3 | Monaco | 38 | 17 | 14 | 7 | 57 | 50 | +7 | 65 | Qualification for the Champions League third qualifying round |
| 4 | Nice | 38 | 18 | 9 | 11 | 58 | 41 | +17 | 63 | Qualification for the Europa League group stage (Note: Since the winners of the 2015–16 Coupe de France and the 2015–16 Coupe de la Ligue, Paris Saint-Germain, qualified for European competition based on their league position, the spot awarded to the Coupe de France winners (Europa League group stage) was passed to the fourth-placed team and the spot awarded to the Coupe de la Ligue winners (Europa League third qualifying round) was passed to the sixth-placed team. The fifth-placed team received the spot in Europa League third qualifying round originally designated to the fourth-placed team.) |
| 5 | Lille | 38 | 15 | 15 | 8 | 39 | 27 | +12 | 60 | Qualification for the Europa League third qualifying round |
| 6 | Saint-Étienne | 38 | 17 | 7 | 14 | 42 | 37 | +5 | 58 | Qualification for the Europa League third qualifying round |
| 7 | Caen | 38 | 16 | 6 | 16 | 39 | 52 | −13 | 54 | |
| 8 | Rennes | 38 | 13 | 13 | 12 | 52 | 54 | −2 | 52 | |
| 9 | Angers | 38 | 13 | 11 | 14 | 40 | 38 | +2 | 50 | |
| 10 | Bastia | 38 | 14 | 8 | 16 | 36 | 42 | −6 | 50 | |
| 11 | Bordeaux | 38 | 12 | 14 | 12 | 50 | 57 | −7 | 50 | |
| 12 | Montpellier | 38 | 14 | 7 | 17 | 49 | 47 | +2 | 49 | |
| 13 | Marseille | 38 | 10 | 18 | 10 | 48 | 42 | +6 | 48 | |
| 14 | Nantes | 38 | 12 | 12 | 14 | 33 | 44 | −11 | 48 | |
| 15 | Lorient | 38 | 11 | 13 | 14 | 47 | 58 | −11 | 46 | |
| 16 | Guingamp | 38 | 11 | 11 | 16 | 47 | 56 | −9 | 44 | |
| 17 | Toulouse | 38 | 9 | 13 | 16 | 45 | 55 | −10 | 40 | |
| 18 | Reims (R) | 38 | 10 | 9 | 19 | 44 | 57 | −13 | 39 | Relegation to Ligue 2 (Note: Starting this season, Ligue 1 decided to reduce the number of relegation spots from three to two. However, the decision was appealed and overturned so three teams were relegated.) |
| 19 | Gazélec Ajaccio (R) | 38 | 8 | 13 | 17 | 37 | 58 | −21 | 37 | Relegation to Ligue 2 |
| 20 | Troyes (R) | 38 | 3 | 9 | 26 | 28 | 83 | −55 | 18 | Relegation to Ligue 2 |

Source: Ligue 1, Soccerway
Rules for classification: 1) Points; 2) Goal difference; 3) Goals scored; 4) Head-to-head points; 5) Head-to-head goal difference; 6) Fairplay ranking.
(C) Champions; (R) Relegated

== Results ==
| Home \ Away | ANG | BAS | BOR | CAE | GAZ | GUI | LIL | LOR | OL | OM | ASM | MHS | NAN | NIC | PSG | REI | REN | STE | TFC | TRO |
|---|---|---|---|---|---|---|---|---|---|---|---|---|---|---|---|---|---|---|---|---|
| Angers | | 1–0 | 1–1 | 2–0 | 0–0 | 0–0 | 2–0 | 5–1 | 0–3 | 0–1 | 3–0 | 2–3 | 0–0 | 1–1 | 0–0 | 0–0 | 0–2 | 0–0 | 2–3 | 1–0 |
| Bastia | 1–0 | | 1–0 | 1–0 | 1–2 | 3–0 | 1–2 | 0–0 | 1–0 | 2–1 | 1–2 | 1–0 | 0–0 | 1–3 | 0–2 | 2–0 | 2–1 | 0–1 | 3–0 | 2–0 |
| Bordeaux | 1–3 | 1–1 | | 1–4 | 1–1 | 1–0 | 1–0 | 3–0 | 3–1 | 1–1 | 3–1 | 0–0 | 2–0 | 0–0 | 1–1 | 1–2 | 4–0 | 1–4 | 1–1 | 1–0 |
| Caen | 0–0 | 0–0 | 1–0 | | 2–0 | 2–1 | 1–2 | 1–2 | 0–4 | 1–3 | 2–2 | 2–1 | 0–2 | 2–0 | 0–3 | 0–2 | 1–0 | 1–0 | 1–0 | 2–1 |
| Gazélec Ajaccio | 0–2 | 3–2 | 2–0 | 1–0 | | 0–0 | 2–4 | 1–1 | 2–1 | 1–1 | 0–1 | 0–4 | 1–1 | 3–1 | 0–4 | 2–2 | 1–1 | 0–2 | 2–2 | 2–3 |
| Guingamp | 2–2 | 1–0 | 2–4 | 1–1 | 2–1 | | 1–1 | 2–2 | 0–1 | 2–0 | 3–3 | 2–2 | 2–2 | 2–3 | 0–2 | 1–2 | 0–2 | 2–0 | 2–0 | 4–0 |
| Lille | 0–0 | 1–1 | 0–0 | 1–0 | 1–0 | 0–0 | | 3–0 | 1–0 | 1–2 | 4–1 | 2–0 | 0–1 | 1–1 | 0–1 | 2–0 | 1–1 | 1–0 | 1–0 | 1–3 |
| Lorient | 3–1 | 1–1 | 3–2 | 2–0 | 1–0 | 4–3 | 0–1 | | 1–3 | 1–1 | 0–2 | 1–1 | 0–0 | 0–0 | 1–2 | 2–0 | 1–1 | 0–1 | 1–1 | 4–1 |
| Lyon | 0–2 | 2–0 | 3–0 | 4–1 | 2–1 | 5–1 | 0–0 | 0–0 | | 1–1 | 6–1 | 2–4 | 2–0 | 1–1 | 2–1 | 1–0 | 1–2 | 3–0 | 3–0 | 4–1 |
| Marseille | 1–2 | 4–1 | 0–0 | 0–1 | 1–1 | 0–0 | 1–1 | 1–1 | 1–1 | | 3–3 | 2–2 | 1–1 | 0–1 | 1–2 | 1–0 | 2–5 | 1–1 | 1–1 | 6–0 |
| Monaco | 1–0 | 2–0 | 1–2 | 1–1 | 2–2 | 3–2 | 0–0 | 2–3 | 1–1 | 2–1 | | 2–0 | 1–0 | 1–0 | 0–3 | 2–2 | 1–1 | 1–0 | 4–0 | 3–1 |
| Montpellier | 0–2 | 2–0 | 0–1 | 1–2 | 0–2 | 2–1 | 3–0 | 2–1 | 0–2 | 0–1 | 2–3 | | 2–1 | 0–2 | 0–1 | 3–1 | 2–0 | 1–2 | 2–0 | 4–1 |
| Nantes | 2–0 | 0–0 | 2–2 | 1–2 | 3–1 | 1–0 | 0–3 | 2–1 | 0–0 | 0–1 | 0–0 | 0–2 | | 1–0 | 1–4 | 1–0 | 0–2 | 2–1 | 1–1 | 3–0 |
| Nice | 2–1 | 0–2 | 6–1 | 2–1 | 3–0 | 0–1 | 0–0 | 2–1 | 3–0 | 1–1 | 1–2 | 1–0 | 1–2 | | 0–3 | 2–0 | 3–0 | 2–0 | 1–0 | 2–1 |
| Paris SG | 5–1 | 2–0 | 2–2 | 6–0 | 2–0 | 3–0 | 0–0 | 3–1 | 5–1 | 2–1 | 0–2 | 0–0 | 4–0 | 4–1 | | 4–1 | 4–0 | 4–1 | 5–0 | 4–1 |
| Reims | 2–1 | 0–1 | 4–1 | 0–1 | 1–2 | 0–1 | 1–0 | 4–1 | 4–1 | 1–0 | 0–1 | 2–3 | 2–1 | 1–1 | 1–1 | | 2–2 | 1–1 | 1–3 | 1–1 |
| Rennes | 1–0 | 1–2 | 2–2 | 1–1 | 1–0 | 0–3 | 1–1 | 2–2 | 2–2 | 0–1 | 1–1 | 1–0 | 4–1 | 1–4 | 0–1 | 3–1 | | 0–1 | 3–1 | 1–1 |
| Saint-Étienne | 1–0 | 2–1 | 1–1 | 1–2 | 2–0 | 3–0 | 0–1 | 2–0 | 1–0 | 0–2 | 1–1 | 3–0 | 2–0 | 1–4 | 0–2 | 3–0 | 1–1 | | 0–0 | 1–0 |
| Toulouse | 1–2 | 4–0 | 4–0 | 2–0 | 1–1 | 1–2 | 1–1 | 2–3 | 2–3 | 1–1 | 1–1 | 1–1 | 0–0 | 2–0 | 0–1 | 2–2 | 1–2 | 2–1 | | 1–0 |
| Troyes | 0–1 | 1–1 | 2–4 | 1–3 | 0–0 | 0–1 | 1–1 | 0–1 | 0–1 | 1–1 | 0–0 | 0–0 | 0–1 | 3–3 | 0–9 | 2–1 | 2–4 | 0–1 | 0–3 | |

Source: Ligue 1
Legend: Blue = home team win; Yellow = draw; Red = away team win.

== Season statistics ==
=== Top goalscorers ===
| Rank | Player | Club | Goals |
|---|---|---|---|
| 1 | (Sweden) Zlatan Ibrahimović | Paris Saint-Germain | 38 |
| 2 | (France) Alexandre Lacazette | Lyon | 21 |
| 3 | (Uruguay) Edinson Cavani | Paris Saint-Germain | 19 |
| 4 | (Belgium) Michy Batshuayi | Marseille | 17 |
| 4 | (France) Hatem Ben Arfa | Nice | 17 |
| 4 | (France) Wissam Ben Yedder | Toulouse | 17 |
| 7 | (France) Valère Germain | Nice | 14 |
| 8 | (Cameroon) Benjamin Moukandjo | Lorient | 13 |
| 9 | (France) Andy Delort | Caen | 12 |
| 9 | (France) Ousmane Dembélé | Rennes | 12 |

=== Hat-tricks ===
| Player | Club | Against | Result | Date |
|---|---|---|---|---|
| (France) Nabil Fekir | Lyon | Caen | 4–0 (H) | 29 August 2015 |
| (France) Alexandre Lacazette | Lyon | Saint-Étienne | 3–0 (H) | 8 November 2015 |
| (France) Wissam Ben Yedder | Toulouse | Reims | 3–1 (H) | 9 January 2016 |
| (France) Ousmane Dembélé | Rennes | Nantes | 4–1 (H) | 6 March 2016 |
| (Sweden) Zlatan Ibrahimović^{4} | Paris Saint-Germain | Troyes | 9–0 (H) | 13 March 2016 |
| (Sweden) Zlatan Ibrahimović | Paris Saint-Germain | Nice | 4–1 (H) | 2 April 2016 |
| (France) Hatem Ben Arfa | Nice | Rennes | 3–0 (H) | 10 April 2016 |
| (Morocco) Sofiane Boufal | Lille | Gazélec Ajaccio | 4–2 (H) | 16 April 2016 |
| (Uruguay) Edinson Cavani | Paris Saint-Germain | Gazélec Ajaccio | 4–0 (A) | 7 May 2016 |
| (France) Alexandre Lacazette | Lyon | Monaco | 6–1 (H) | 7 May 2016 |

Note

^{4} Player scored 4 goals

== Awards ==
| Award | Winner | Club |
|---|---|---|
| Player of the Season | (Sweden) Zlatan Ibrahimović | Paris Saint-Germain |
| Young Player of the Season | (France) Ousmane Dembélé | Rennes |
| Goalkeeper of the Season | (France) Steve Mandanda | Marseille |
| Goal of the Season | (France) Pierrick Capelle | Angers |
| Manager of the Season | (France) Laurent Blanc | Paris Saint-Germain |

Team of the Year
| Goalkeeper | (France) Steve Mandanda (Marseille) | | | |
| Defenders | (Ivory Coast) Serge Aurier (Paris Saint-Germain) | (Brazil) David Luiz (Paris Saint-Germain) | (Brazil) Thiago Silva (Paris Saint-Germain) | (Brazil) Maxwell (Paris Saint-Germain) |
| Midfielders | (Italy) Marco Verratti (Paris Saint-Germain) | (France) Lassana Diarra (Marseille) | | (France) Blaise Matuidi (Paris Saint-Germain) |
| Forwards | (Argentina) Ángel Di María (Paris Saint-Germain) | (Sweden) Zlatan Ibrahimović (Paris Saint-Germain) | | (France) Hatem Ben Arfa (Nice) |

== Attendances ==
| # | Football club | Home games | Average attendance |
|---|---|---|---|
| 1 | Paris Saint-Germain | 19 | 46,160 |
| 2 | Olympique de Marseille | 19 | 42,015 |
| 3 | Olympique lyonnais | 19 | 40,296 |
| 4 | AS Saint-Étienne | 19 | 30,328 |
| 5 | Lille OSC | 19 | 30,268 |
| 6 | FC Nantes | 19 | 25,226 |
| 7 | Girondins de Bordeaux | 19 | 25,088 |
| 8 | Stade rennais | 19 | 23,180 |
| 9 | OGC Nice | 19 | 19,192 |
| 10 | SM Caen | 19 | 17,661 |
| 11 | Toulouse FC | 19 | 16,306 |
| 12 | EA Guingamp | 19 | 14,804 |
| 13 | Angers SCO | 19 | 13,500 |
| 14 | Stade de Reims | 19 | 13,482 |
| 15 | Montpellier HSC | 19 | 12,839 |
| 16 | ESTAC | 19 | 12,472 |
| 17 | FC Lorient | 19 | 11,988 |
| 18 | SC Bastia | 19 | 11,563 |
| 19 | AS Monaco | 19 | 7,838 |
| 20 | GFCA | 19 | 3,719 |
