= Sigua =

Sigua can mean:

- Tengiz Sigua
- Sigua (vegetable)
- Sigua River, in Guam
- Sigua Falls, in Guam
- Sigua, in Siguatepeque
