= Sumay, Guam =

Sumay
- Village
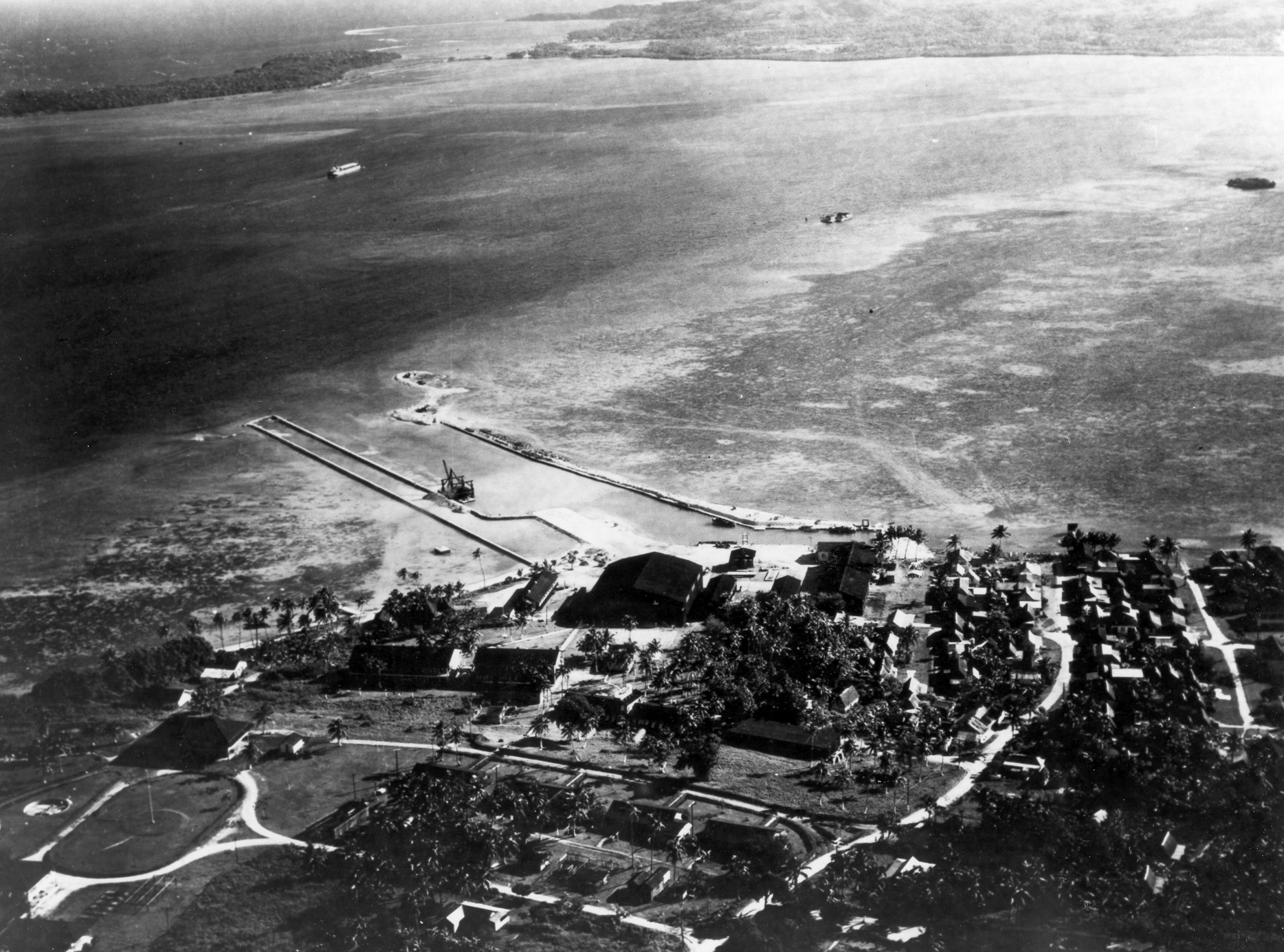
- Sumay in the 1930s

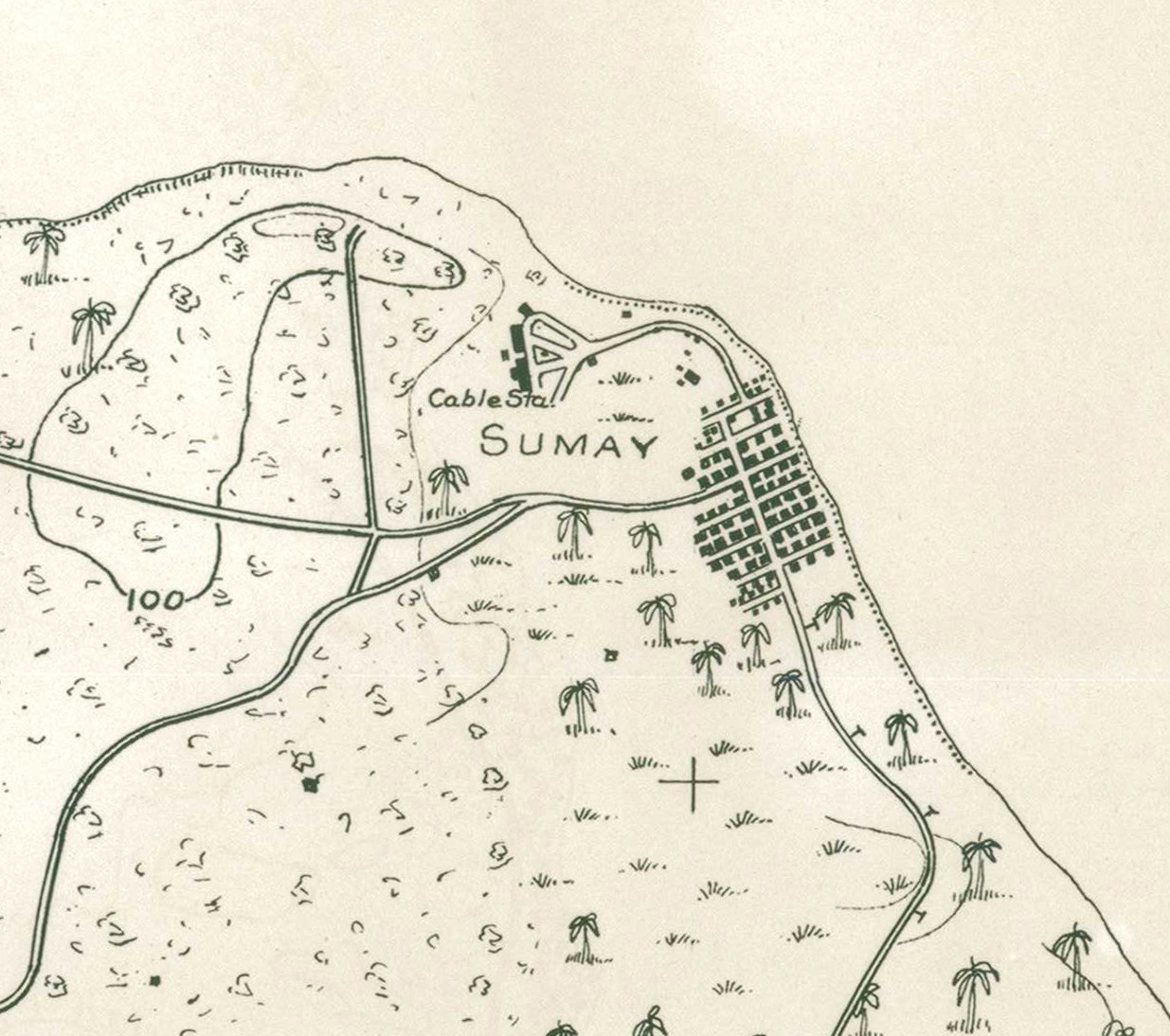
- Map of Sumay on Apra Harbor, 1912. Also seen is the Guam Cable Station

- Sumay on the Orote Peninsula, Guam Sumay (Earth)
- Coordinates: 13°26′13.8″N 144°39′11.5″E
- Country: United States
- Territory: Guam
- Taking by U.S. government: 1948

Population (1941)
  - Total: 1,997

Sumay, also Sumai, was a village on the United States territory of Guam. It was located on the north coast of the Orote Peninsula along Apra Harbor. It was inhabited by Chamorro people before contact with Europeans. Sumay became a prosperous port town serving whalers and other sailors in the 1800s and the second most populous settlement on Guam after Hagåtña, the capital of the Spanish Mariana Islands. Following the Capture of Guam by the United States in 1898 during the Spanish-American War, the village was the site of Marine Barracks Guam. In the early 1900s, it was a link for two firsts connecting the United States and Asia: the first submarine communications cable for telegraph and the China Clipper, the first air service. After the Japanese invasion of Guam in 1941, the residents were evicted and the village turned into a Japanese military garrison. Sumay was leveled during the U.S. liberation of the island in 1944. The U.S. military prohibited the residents from returning, relocating them to the hills of nearby Sånta Rita-Sumai. In 1948, the U.S. military exercised eminent domain and took all private and commercial property at Sumay. Its former location is now on Naval Base Guam.

== History ==
An old cave complex at Sumay indicates that the location was inhabited prior to contact with Europeans, but is not well documented. In June 1678, amid the Spanish-Chamorro Wars where Spain attempted to solidify control of the island, Governor Juan Antonio de Salas led a military column to Sumay and the nearby village of Orote, which were both considered hotbeds of anti-Spanish resistance, setting fire to homes. While the Spanish relocated much of the population into centralized villages during their rule, Sumay was allowed to continue. In 1734, Governor Francisco de Cárdenas Pacheco opened up new anchorages in Apra Harbor to better protect ships from attack. Sumay eventually became a thriving port town, in particular during the height of Pacific whaling in the 1800s. Following the 1856 smallpox epidemic, the survivors from Pago, as well as the Catholic mission, were transferred to Sumay.

=== American period ===
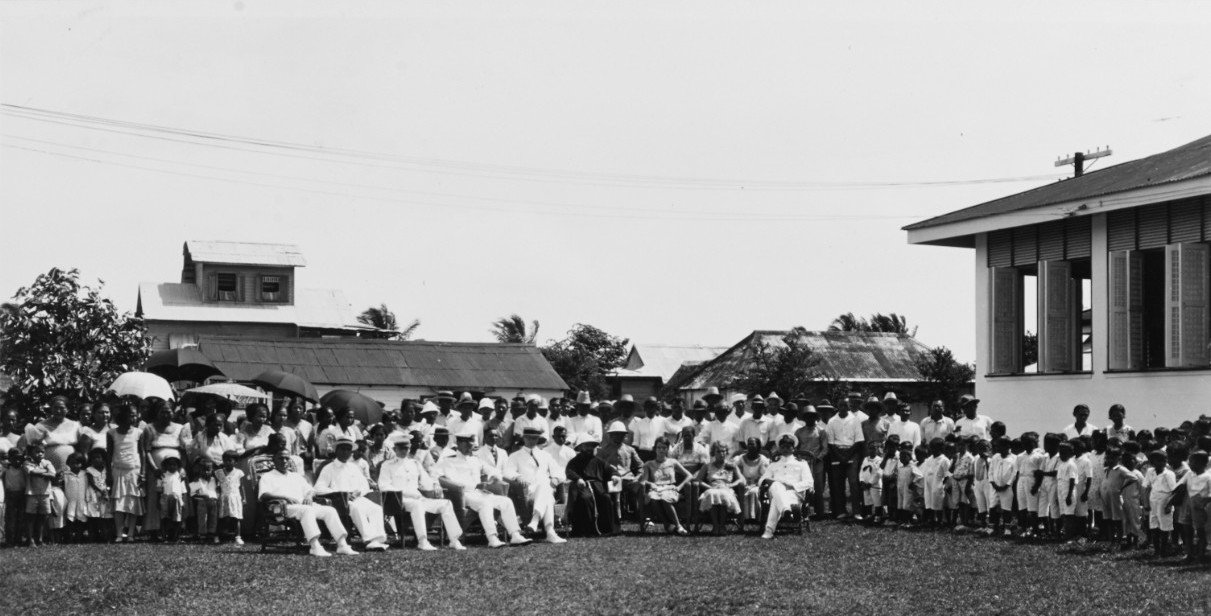
Governor Willis W. Bradley at the Maxwell School in Sumay, ca. 1930

After the American Capture of Guam in 1898, Sumay continued its existence as an economically important village in a strategic location on the island. On August 7, 1899, a Naval Governorship was established The Marine Barracks Guam was formally established at Sumay in 1901. In 1903, the Commercial Pacific Cable Company laid submarine communications cable for telegraph through a station at Sumay, linking the United States to Asia, and each to Guam, for the first time. On April 7, 1917, Marines from Sumay fired warning shots at a launch from SMS Cormoran, a German merchant raider that had been held in Apra Harbor for two years. Upon being informed that a state of war existed and that Cormoran would be confiscated, her crew scuttled her, resulting in seven deaths. This incident was the first violent action of the United States in World War I, first shots fired by the U.S. against Germany in WWI, the first German prisoners of war captured by the U.S., and the first Germans killed in action by the U.S. in WWI

Sumay was Guam's second most populous village in the 1920 census. In 1922, dredged materials from the harbor were used to fill the coastline at Sumay and a seawall was constructed, meaning that the village no longer followed the shoreline. On March 17, 1921, as the U.S. grew suspicious of Japanese intentions for its South Seas Mandate, including the Northern Mariana Islands, Scouting Squadron 1 of the new United States Marine Corps Aviation, organized as Flight L out of Parris Island, arrived at Sumay. Comprising 10 pilots and 90 enlisted men, the Marine aviators set up a shoreside base for their amphibious aircraft, which at first comprised Fairey N.9s, Curtiss HS-2Ls, and Felixstowe F.5Ls, and later Vought VE-7s and Loening OLs. The Marine Aviation unit also took detailed weather information that contributed to trans-Pacific aviation.

Guam's first golf course, Sumay Golf Links, was established in the village in 1923. In response to budgetary pressures after the Wall Street crash of 1929 and a new mood of isolationism the U.S. decided to close the seaplane base at Sumay on February 23, 1931. The Maxwell School, named after Governor William John Maxwell, was constructed in the early 1930s. In 1935, Pan American Airways established rights to use the former Marine Aviation facility and made Sumay a base for its China Clipper. The first trans-Pacific air cargo service, flying from San Francisco to Manila, arrived at Sumay on November 27, 1935, and the first passenger service flight on October 21, 1936. Pan American also built Guam's first hotel in the village for its wealthy Clipper passengers in March 1936 with supplies brought by the SS North Haven. The 20-room Skyways Inn became a popular gathering place for island political and business leaders to mingle with guests.

=== Destruction and taking ===
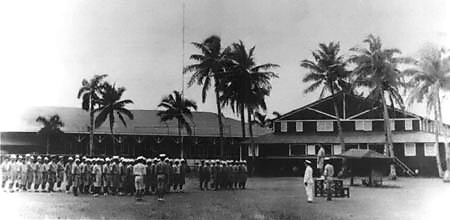
Imperial Japanese Navy troops mustering at the former Marine Barracks in Sumay

At least 2,000 people lived in Sumay before the Japanese invasion on December 8, 1941. Due to its strategic importance and Marine barracks, the village was the first target of Japanese bombing. Governor George McMillin wrote,

Enemy planes appeared from the direction of Saipan shortly after eight o'clock, and the first bombs were dropped on the Marine Reservation and vicinity at 0827. The Marines were in the barracks, or on their normal duties throughout the post. Several were injured running across the golf course, for protection in the surrounding thickets. The Pan Air Hotel kitchen received a direct hit, and several native employees were killed. [...] Bombing continued on Tuesday, [9] December. [...] Considerable additional material damage was done at the Marine Reservation, Pan Air Installation, Standard Oil tanks (which were set on fire by bombs on Monday, [8] December)

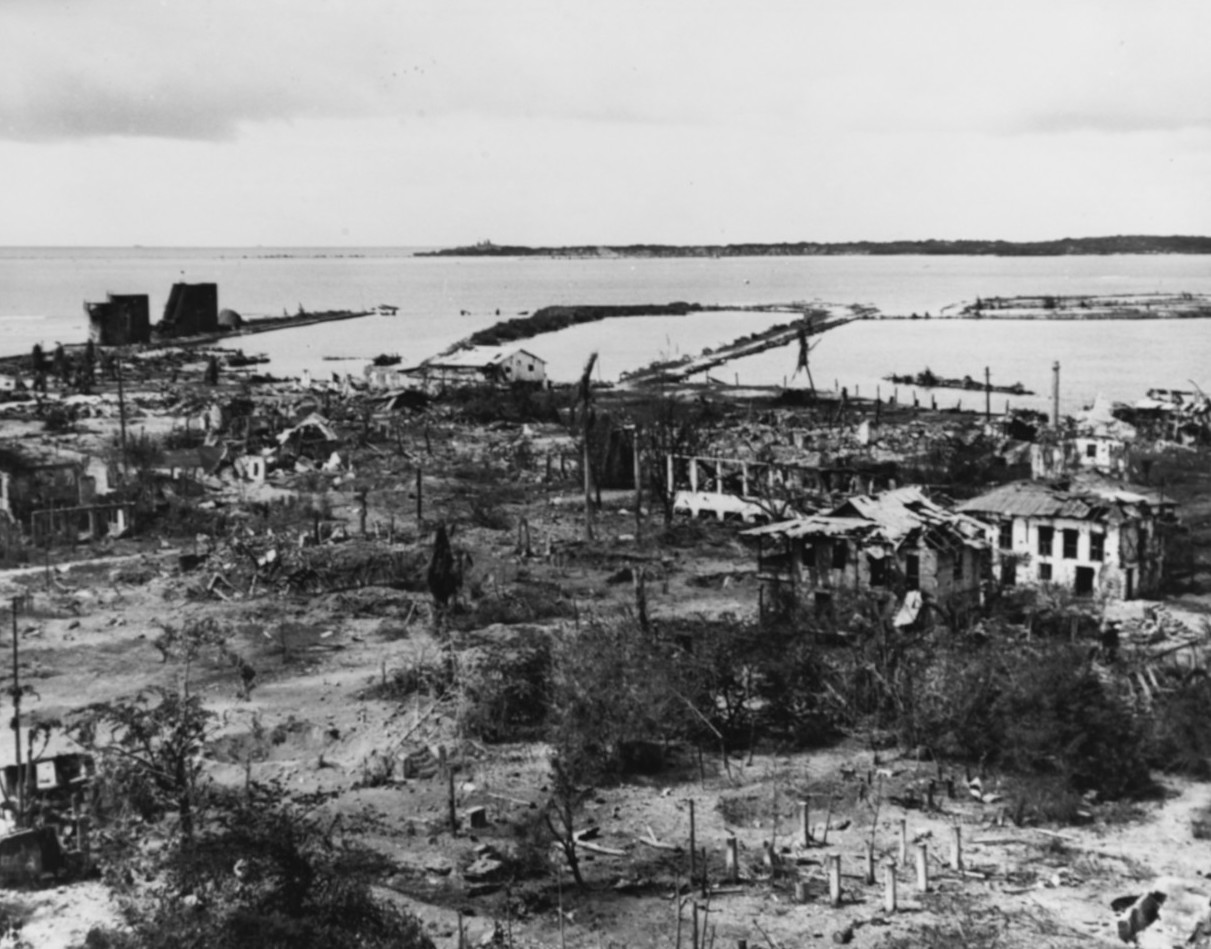
Destruction of Sumay after the 1944 Battle of Guam

The residents of Sumay had fled during the bombing, many to a ranch named Apla at the current location of the Navy Exchange and Commissary. Many families became separated during the confusion. Several days after the surrender of American forces on December 10, 1941, the Japanese forces evicted the residents of Sumay in order to turn it into a garrison, and residents were forbidden to return without permission. Five girls from Sumay were raped during eviction. During the Japanese occupation of Guam, some Sumay residents were conscripted into constructing Orote Field, and Santa Marian Guadalupe Church was turned into an auditorium for the Japanese military. In anticipation of an American attack, in July 1944 the Japanese military forced the residents of Sumay who had been living in Apla to march to the Manenggon Concentration Camp; 34 residents of Sumay and Agat were herded into caves at Fena and massacred with grenades. After fierce fighting during the American recapturing of Guam, U.S. forces declared the peninsula secured on July 29, 1944. An estimated 3,000 Japanese soldiers died defending the Orote Peninsula and the village of Sumay was essentially leveled.

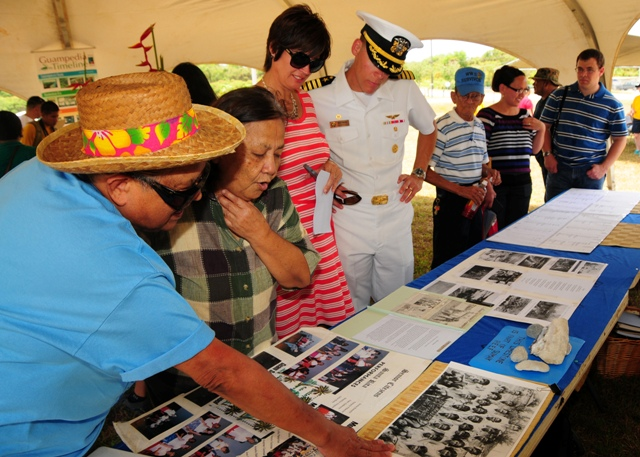
The commanding officer of Naval Base Guam and former residents of Sumay at the old location of the village on Back to Sumay Day, 2013

The U.S. military prohibited reentry to location of Sumay as Apra Harbor had become a key strategic location of the Pacific War, but residents eventually gathered at Apla, building makeshift homes as they awaited permission to return and rebuild. At one point, many were allowed back to gather small items in the ruins of houses that had survived. Meanwhile, Admiral Chester Nimitz requested 55% of Guam be set aside for military use, including all of Sumay. In 1945, the U.S. military gave the Sumay residents in Apla two resettlement options: to Agat or to a "temporary" refugee camp in the nearby hills of what is now Sånta Rita-Sumai, originally called just Santa Rita. Sumay residents chose the second option, moving through 1945 and 1946 to an undeveloped area with no roads, running water, or electricity. In 1946, the U.S. Congress passed Public Law 594, The Guam Acquisition of Lands Act, allowing the U.S. Navy to acquire any and all lands it deemed necessary on the island. In 1948, the military filed Civil Case No. 5-49 in the Superior Court of Guam, declaring a taking of all of Sumay, totaling 245 private and commercial plots, for little or no compensation.

In 1952, the village of Santa Rita completed its church, dedicating it to Our Lady of Guadalupe, the patron saint of Sumay. Sumay residents were allowed back to their old village for the first time in 1961 to tend the graves of their relatives on All Souls' Day, a traditional Chamorro practice. In 1968, Agat Park was renamed Agat-Sumay Memorial Park. In 1972, the Legislature of Guam passed a resolution recognizing the suffering of the people of Sumay and a housing division in Santa Rita called New Sumay was constructed; this subdivision is now referred to as Santa Rosa or Hyundai. The Sumay Memorial Park was dedicated in 1983 on the site of the old church. In 1988, the Santa Rita-Sumay Peace Memorial was erected at the former entrance to the refugee camp that residents moved to in 1945–1946. In 1999, Sumay Cemetery was listed in the National Register of Historic Places The cemetery, a cross from the village church, and ruins of a few structures are all that remain of the village.

In modern times, the location and name of Sumay are shared with Sumay Cove Marina, which offers outdoor recreation services on Naval Base Guam.

== Notable residents ==
- Antonio Borja Won Pat (1908–1987), first Delegate from Guam to the U.S. House of Representatives from 1973 to 1985 and namesake of Antonio B. Won Pat International Airport
- Vicente T. Blaz, known as Ben Blaz (1928–2014), first person of an ethnic minority to achieve general rank in the U.S. Marine Corps, first Chamorro to reach general rank in the U.S. Armed Forces, second Delegate from Guam to the U.S. House of Representatives from 1985 to 1993, namesake of Marine Corps Base Camp Blaz
