= Commercial Pacific Cable Company =

Former undersea cable company (1901–1951)

House flag of Commercial Pacific Cable Company

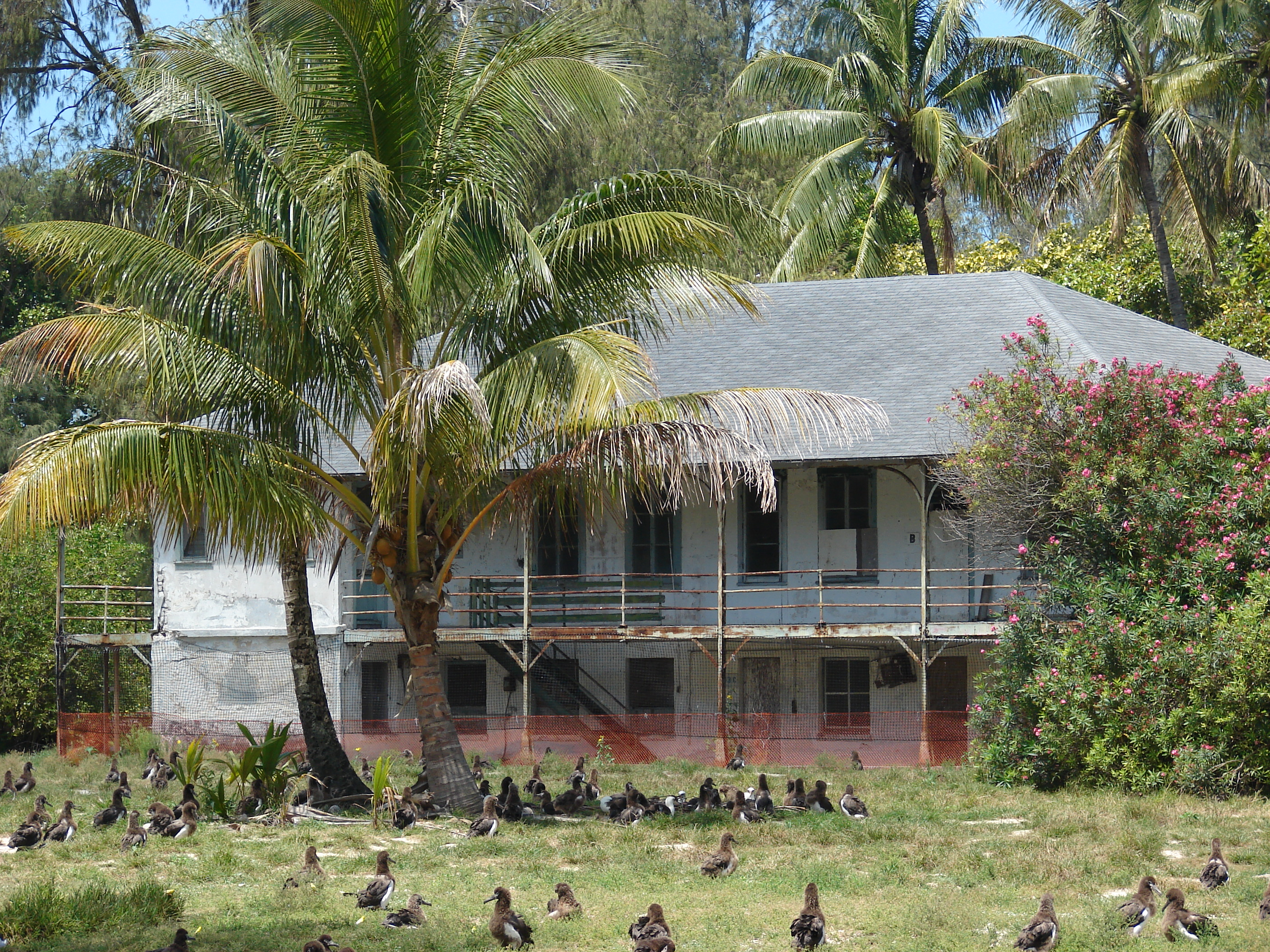
The buildings of the Commercial Pacific Cable Company on Midway Island date back to 1903 (2008).

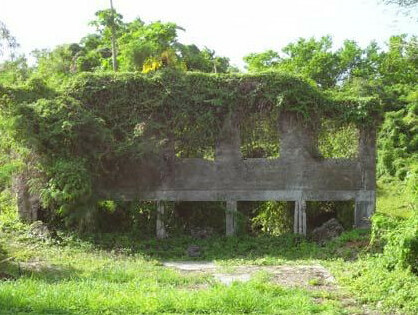
Ruins of Guam's first transpacific cable station.Reduced to ruins by the fighting of World War II, the ruins of the establishment remain on the grounds of Naval Base Guam on the west side of the island.

Commercial Pacific Cable Company was founded in 1901, and ceased operations in October 1951. It provided the first direct telegraph route from America to the Philippines, China, and Japan.

The company was established as a joint venture of three companies: the Commercial Cable Company (25%), the Great Northern Telegraph Company (25%), and the Eastern Telegraph Company (50%). Though the Eastern (a British firm) was the majority shareholder, the CPCC was registered in the United States.

The company used cable ships to lay its undersea cable across the Pacific Ocean from America's west coast. The cables extended a length of 6,912 miles (11,124 km) and the project cost about $12 million. Before this, messages had to travel across the Atlantic to the Far East via Cape Town and the Indian Ocean, or via London to Russia, then across the Russian landline to Vladivostok, then by submarine cable to Japan and the Philippines.

The first section of cable was laid in 1902 by the cable ship CS Silvertown from Ocean Beach, adjacent to the famous Cliff House in San Francisco to Honolulu. It began operating on January 1, 1903. Later that year, cables were laid from Honolulu to Midway Atoll, thence to Sumay, Guam, and thence to Manila. The cables carried the first message to ever travel around the globe from US President Theodore Roosevelt on July 4, 1903. He wished "a happy Independence Day to the US, its territories and properties..." It took nine minutes for the message to travel worldwide.

In 1906 Siemens made and laid the section from Guam to Bonin Islands in the Japanese archipelago. In the same year the India Rubber, Gutta Percha and Telegraph Works Company manufactured and laid a cable between Manila and Shanghai using CS Silvertown and CS Store Nordiske.

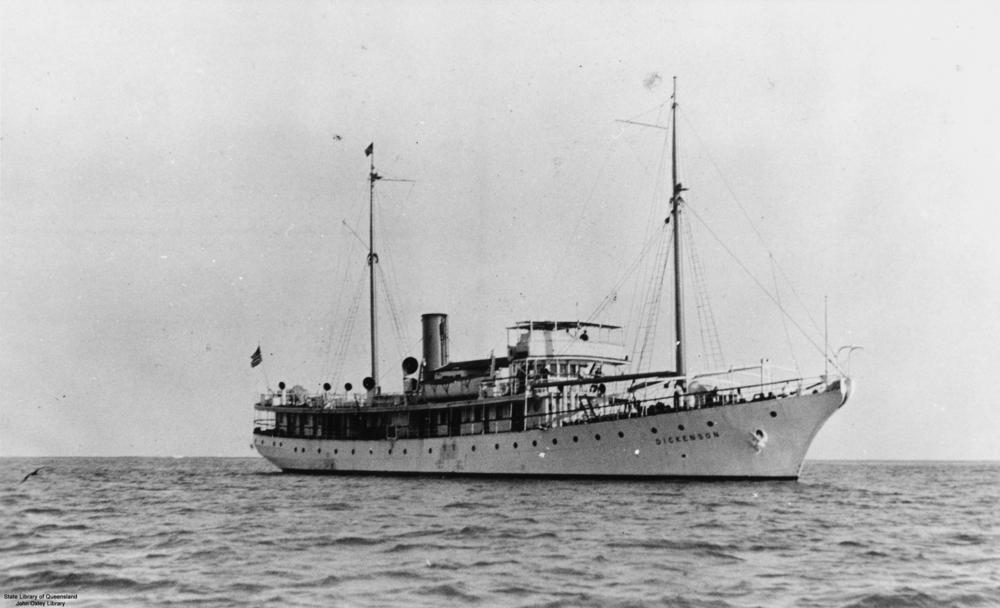
Commercial Pacific's CS Dickenson, built in 1923

In World War I, the trans-Pacific service slowed significantly from repeated faults and the general increase in war-related traffic. Despite repeated requests by United States businesses and the Federal government, the company would not invest in improvements to increase traffic volume or speed. After the war conditions eased, but demand continued to be high and the company made repeated promises to invest in a second cable, though it never followed through on these promises. When the US entered World War II, the cable connection from Midway to the Philippines closed quickly after 7 December 1941 and did not reopen until the war was over.

By 1946 the cables were developing serious faults. Over a million dollars was spent on repairs, but the company was unable to maintain a viable service and stopped operating in 1951. It merged with American Telephone and Telegraph (AT&T).

== See also ==
- Celso Caesar Moreno and Li Hongzhang had tried to establish a trans-Pacific telegraph cable in the 1870s.
