= St. Thomas Aquinas Catholic High School (Guam) =

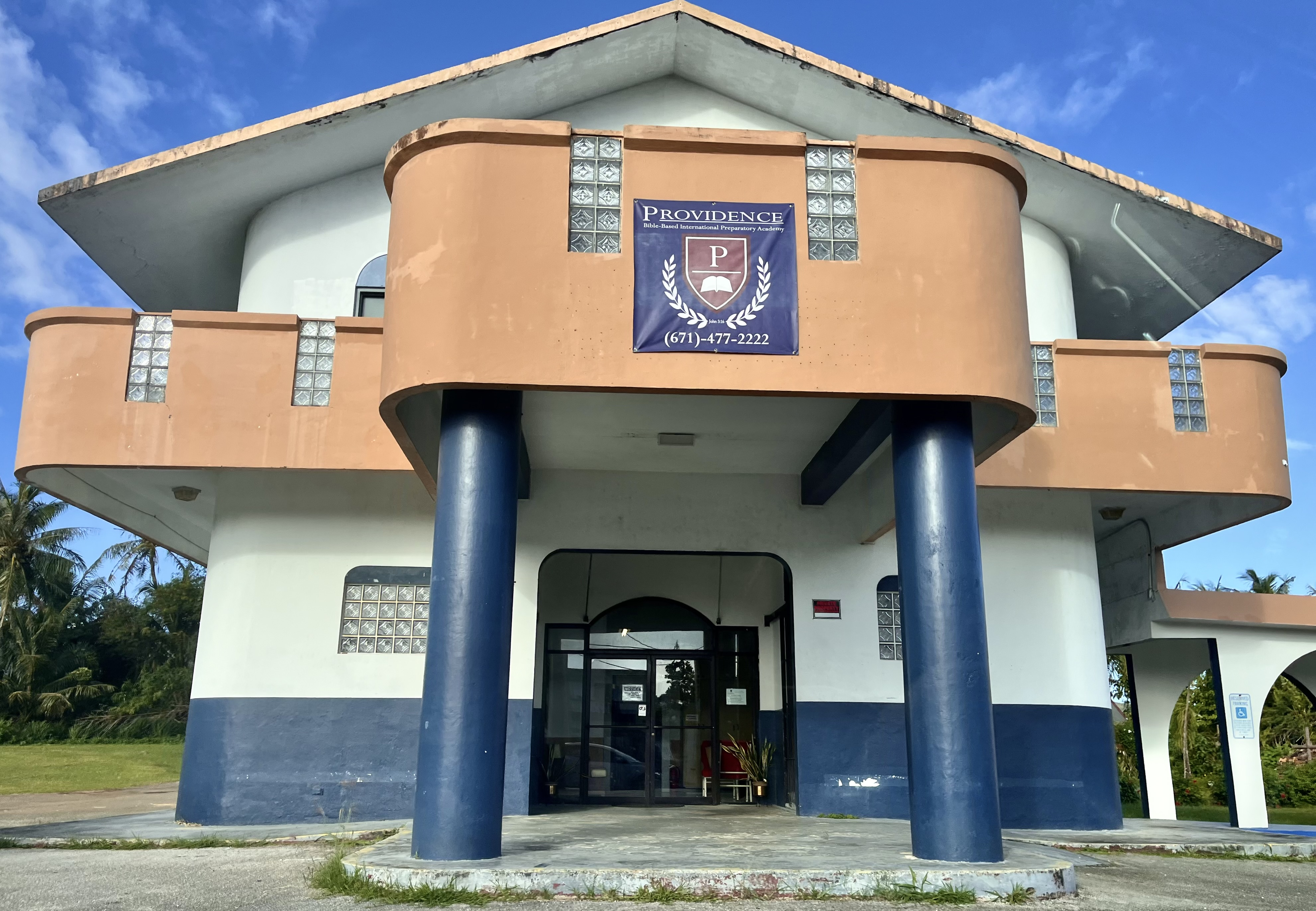

Location
- 131 Judge Sablan Street; Ordot, Guam; 13°26′38″N 144°46′6″E

Information
- Type: Private, Coeducational
- Motto: Admiratio est principium philosophandi (Wonder is the Desire for Knowledge)
- Religious affiliation: Roman Catholic
- Established: 2008
- Closed: 2015
- CEEB code: 525-209
- Administrator: Deacon Steve Martínez
- Director: Mrs. Ichie Shepherd
- Principal: Ms. Pilar Perez Williams
- Chaplain: Fr. Val Rodriguez
- Faculty: 13
- Grades: 9-12
- Enrollment: 71
- Student to teacher ratio: 7 to 1
- Classrooms: 6
- Colors: Midnight Blue and Gold
- Athletics: Member IIAAG
- Mascot: Lion
- Accreditation: WASC & WCEA
- Tuition: $8,575
- Affiliations: NCEA, BBBS, AP-Board, STEM Education Coalition, NHS, Tri-M.
- Website: staguam.com

St. Thomas Aquinas Catholic High School was a coeducational college preparatory Roman Catholic school located at 131 Judge Sablan Street in Ordot, Guam, a United States territory in the Western Pacific Ocean.

The school opened in the Fall of 2008, and was the newest Catholic High School on Guam, under the Archdiocese of Agana.

In 2015 the archdiocese decided that as the school did not have enough students, it should be closed.
