= Guam Cable Station =

- Cable Station Ruins
- U.S. National Register of Historic Places
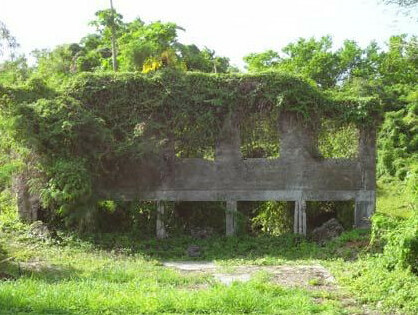
- Undated US Navy photo of the cable station remains

- Location within Guam
- Location: Sumay
- Nearest city: Santa Rita, Guam
- Coordinates: 13°26′20″N 144°39′01″E
- Area: 6 acres (2.4 ha)
- Built: 1903
- Built by: Commercial Pacific Cable Company
- NRHP reference No.: 79003742
- Added to NRHP: September 6, 1979

The Guam Cable Station is where the United States territory of Guam was first connected via modern telecommunications to the rest of the world. Reduced to ruins by the fighting of World War II, the ruins of the establishment remain on the grounds of Naval Base Guam on the west side of the island.

== History ==
In 1901, the Commercial Pacific Cable Company offered to lay a cable between the continental United States and Guam at no cost to the federal government. In 1903 the company began construction of a series of buildings near what was the village of Sumay which was leveled in 1944. Designed to be proof against typhoons, earthquakes, and other perils, the complex included the main cable station building, several buildings of living quarters, and a self-contained water supply system. The cable connecting Guam to Hawaii was completed in June 1903, marking the complete encirclement of the globe by communications cables. This station became a major communications hub, eventually also housing cables to China and the island of Yap, and becoming an early-warning center for typhoons. Operation of the cable was interrupted by the Japanese invasion of Guam in 1941. It resumed with the liberation of Guam in 1944, but continued only until 1951, when the cable between Guam and Hawaii was broken. Since then the remains of the cable station have been succumbing to the elements. Its remains were listed on the National Register of Historic Places listings in Guam in 1979.
