= 1856 Guam smallpox epidemic =

Disease outbreak in Guam

- Disease: Smallpox
- Location: Guam, Captaincy General of the Philippines, Spanish Empire
- First outbreak: American schooner E.L. Frost from the Philippines
- Arrival date: February 1856
- Deaths: 4,563

An epidemic of smallpox in 1856 on the west Pacific island of Guam, then under the control of Spain, resulted in the death of over half of the population, or about 4,500 people. The population collapse led Spanish authorities to transfer the population of Pago to Hagåtña, ending a settlement dating back before colonization. It also led the Governor of the Spanish Mariana Islands to encourage immigration to Guam.

The outbreak started in late February 1856, when the American schooner Edward L. Frost arrived in Guam, completing its voyage from the Philippines. A single passenger had died from smallpox on the trip. The Spanish government required a three-day quarantine, but two passengers were allowed to go ashore immediately. The passengers spread the disease to the local population. Governor Felipe María de la Corte y Ruano Calderón took the initiative in introducing a number of safety measures, but the local administration lacked professional medical personnel. The administration did not have a medical officer or any medical advisors.

== Background ==
Population of Guam from 1710 to 1830
Date	Total	Natives	Mixed/Mestizo
1710	3,614	3,143	471
1793	3,584	1,766	961
1795	3,500	1,894	537
1800	4,060	2,108	542
1816	5,389	2,559	1,109
1828	6,448	2,792	970
1830	6,490	2,652	1,012

The 1856 epidemic was part of a long decline in the population of the Guam under Spanish rule. While Jesuit missionary Diego Luis de San Vitores, who established the first permanent presence on Guam in 1668, estimated the CHamoru population to be 100,000, estimates by his contemporaries ranged as low as 24,000 indigenous inhabitants. Scholars dispute whether the CHamoru population at the time of San Vitores had already fallen due to exposure to disease brought by the up to 100 ships that had passed through the Mariana Islands before his arrival.

Epidemics of influenza, smallpox, or whooping cough are recorded throughout the Spanish-Chamorro Wars of the late seventeenth century. In a measure to control the population, Spanish authorities transferred the population of the many small villages into six towns, which may have compounded the spread of the infectious diseases. While some histories blame the depopulation on a genocide of the CHamorus by the Spanish, the historical record records relatively few deaths in the sporadic violence of the Wars. Meanwhile, 650 CHamorus died in an influenza epidemic in 1700. Between 1698 and 1702, there was an average 600 deaths per year, compared to 240 births, for a net population loss of 1,800 for these five years. In 1706, a famine was recorded, apparently due to the severe social disruption. The population nadir was reached in the Spanish census of 1795, which recorded a total population on Guam of 3,500, of which only 1,894 were classified as "natives." From about 1800 to the smallpox epidemic of 1856, the population rebounded. The population in 1856, before the pandemic, was 8,207.

There is very little evidence of the Spanish authorities providing medical care for the population. Records make occasional mention of individuals, often of doubtful credentials, providing treatment, but no mention of any organized effort to provide general care or treat individuals. The medical needs of the majority of the population were addressed by suruhåna , traditional herb doctors. At the beginning of the nineteenth century, a Spanish doctor named Balmis took the newly developed smallpox vaccine to half a dozen Spanish colonies, arriving in Manila in 1805. However, he never made it to the Spanish Marianas and none of Guam's indigenous population was vaccinated.

== History ==
In late February 1856, the American schooner Edward L. Frost anchored in Apra Harbor after completing its voyage from the Philippines. A passenger who had died from smallpox on the trip was buried at sea before anchoring. The Spanish government required a three-day quarantine, but two passengers were allowed to go ashore immediately. After the first island resident became symptomatic, Governor Felipe María de la Corte y Ruano Calderón initiated home quarantines, isolation zones, and construction of isolation wards. However, the administration did not have a medical officer or any medical advisors.

The Spanish priest Aniceto del Carmen wrote an account of the progress of the outbreak:

In the beginning the infested were only from Hagåtña. By the end of August, the epidemic had spread throughout the whole island and at the speed of lightning. The spectacle that the island presented by September was terrible, sad, very sad indeed and overwhelmingly heartbreaking. The (Filipinos) who resided in Guam, could do nothing else all day but carry the corpses in their carts to the hospital of (Adelup) and there give them burial in wide trenches where were laid as many corpses as would possibly fit.

The initial vaccines that arrived from Manila were spoiled. Usable vaccine eventually arrived and was used to inoculate the uninfected and stop the spread. The pandemic peaked between March and September 1856 and burnt itself out by November. Of Guam's pre-outbreak population of 8,207, survivors numbered 3,644. The smallpox pandemic had killed 4,563 people, or over 55% of the population.

== Effects ==
The Honolulu newspaper The Polynesian printed an account by the whaleship Champion, which had anchored at Guam on January 17, 1857, and reported "the inhabitants are starving by the thousands. Four thousand had died with smallpox in three months." It is possible that the lack of people to tend crops resulted in a food shortage.

The number of villagers in Pago fell from 356 to 108 and the Spanish authorities decided to abandon the village and transferred the survivors. In 1952, a marker at the site of old village stated, "abandoned in 1857 after the smallpox epidemic, the survivors moving to Sumay." The Catholic mission at Pago was also moved to Sumay.

Governor de la Corte encouraged immigration to the Marianas to recover the population, even seriously considering encouraging mating between Carolinians and Chinese immigrants to create a race that he believed would not be as vulnerable to disease. The rate and variety of immigration to Guam increased significantly in the decade after the pandemic. About 35 Japanese agricultural laborers arrived in 1867. Perhaps 63 Chinese laborers arrived in 1858, and about 39 more over the course of the 1860s. About 600 Carolinians were brought to Guam on labor contracts around 1861. They were followed between 1865 and 1869 by 1000 Carolinians, sent throughout the Marianas, to develop the copra industry. By 1868, 430 Carolinians were listed as residents of Tamuning. Nearly as many Filipinos as Carolinians also arrived, under a government-sponsored program. Anthropologist Jane H. Underwood, who uses the term "Neo-Chamorro," discusses the 1856 pandemic as a landmark date for her contention that "[t]he rise of a mestizo group was more likely to have involved mixed marriages between Filipinos and natives than a massive infusion of European and Asian genes."

Jose Bernardo Palomo y Torres, who was 20 years old when he lost both of his parents to the 1856 pandemic, stated that the experience convinced him to become the first CHamoru priest. Years later, construction at both Hagåtña and Asan uncovered three-foot deep trenches, each with 50 or more bodies piled on top of each other without ceremony. Over fifty years later in 1917, a U.S. military officer noted, "The scenes occurring during this terrible plague are recalled with the utmost horror by the oldest inhabitants, who describe them with much vividness."
