= Guam v. United States =

- Supreme Court of the United States

Argued April 26, 2021 Decided May 24, 2021
- Full case name: Territory of Guam v. United States
- Docket no.: 20-382
- Citations: 593 U.S. ___ (more) 141 S. Ct. 1608; 209 L. Ed. 2d 691

Case history
- Prior: Motion to dismiss denied, 341 F. Supp. 3d 74 (D.D.C. 2018); Reversed and remanded, 950 F.3d 104 (D.C. Cir. 2020); Cert. granted, 141 S. Ct. 976 (2021)
- Subsequent: Remanded for further proceedings, 852 F. App'x 14 (D.C. Cir. 2021)

Holding
- Section 113(f)(3)(B) did not apply to the consent agreement that Guam made with the EPA, so the three-year statute of limitations from Section 113(f)(3)(B) did not apply.

Court membership
- Chief Justice John Roberts Associate Justices Clarence Thomas · Stephen Breyer; Samuel Alito · Sonia Sotomayor; Elena Kagan · Neil Gorsuch; Brett Kavanaugh · Amy Coney Barrett

Case opinion
- Majority: Thomas, joined by unanimous

Laws applied
- Comprehensive Environmental Response, Compensation, and Liability Act of 1980

Guam v. United States, 593 U.S. ___ (2021), was a U.S. Supreme Court case dealing with a dispute on fiscal responsibility for environmental and hazardous cleanup of the Ordot Dump created by the United States Navy on the island of Guam in the 1940s, which Guam then ran after becoming a territory in 1950 until the landfill's closure in 2011. The Supreme Court ruled unanimously that under the Comprehensive Environmental Response, Compensation, and Liability Act of 1980 (aka Superfund), Guam had filed its lawsuit to recover a portion of cleanup costs for the landfill from the United States government in a timely manner, allowing their case to proceed.

== Background ==
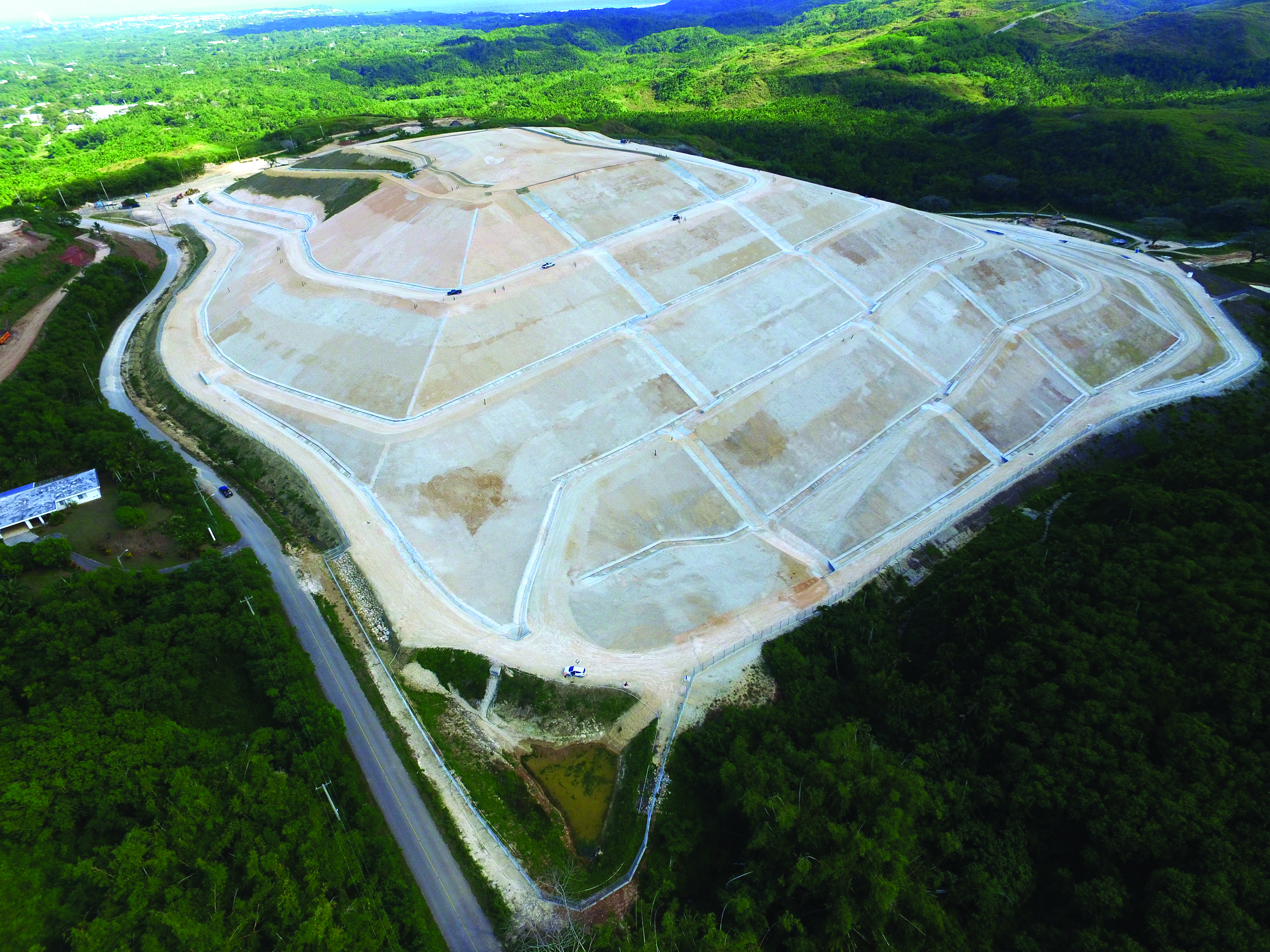
Ordot Landfill in 2016

Guam, an island in the Pacific Ocean, had become a key base for the United States Navy during World War II after the United States regained control of it from Japan in the Battle of Guam in 1944. As part of establishing ports and bases on the island, the Navy created the Ordot Dump landfill for disposal of waste, including material like DDT and Agent Orange. After the war, Guam was made into a U.S. territory by the Guam Organic Act of 1950. Since this gave the island its own governance, the Navy transferred control of the Ordot Dump to Guam that year. The Navy continued to use the landfill until the 1970s, while the landfill was the only solid waste disposal facility for Guam until the 2000s. As the landfill was built without liners or caps, it became an environmental hazard. The Environmental Protection Agency (EPA) added the Ordot Dump to the National Priorities List in 1983 and had named the Navy as a potentially responsible party to it in 1988.

In 2002, the EPA filed a complaint against Guam, stating that their management of the Ordot Dump violated the Clean Water Act, as waste contaminants from the dump were found to run off into the nearby Lonfit River and eventually into the Pacific Ocean. A consent decree was achieved in 2004, with Guam agreeing to pay a fine, close the site, and install a cover on the landfill. A separate action initiated by the EPA in 2004 led to the site's forced closure in 2011, and Guam agreeing to remediate affected areas around the landfill. Total costs for completing these, along with other cleanup efforts ordered by the court, were estimated at $160 million.

Guam filed a suit against the United States in 2017 under the Comprehensive Environmental Response, Compensation, and Liability Act of 1980 (CERCLA, or Superfund), asserting that since the Navy had been found as a potentially responsible party contributing to the site, the U.S. bears some of the cleanup costs, as outlined in CERCLA Section 107(a). The U.S. moved to close the suit, stating that under the clauses of CERCLA, there was a three-year statute of limitations for filing such complaints under CERCLA Section 113(f)(3)(B), which started with the consent agreement in 2004, and thus Guam had missed its window.

The case was first heard in the United States District Court for the District of Columbia in 2018. The District Court ruled to allow the case to proceed in favor of Guam in September 2018. Judge Ketanji Jackson ruled that the consent decree did not involve liability for the environmental cleanup, nor involved the ability of Guam to seek liability response actions under CERCLA. The government appealed to the District of Columbia Circuit, which reversed the District Court's decision in March 2020 and agreed that the statute of limitations for Guam had expired in 2007, three years after the 2004 consent agreement, as set by Section 113(f)(3)(B).

== Supreme Court ==
Guam petitioned their case to the Supreme Court, asking them to resolve the question of whether Section 113(f)(3)(B)'s three-year statute applied to the consent agreement they had made with the EPA. The Court granted certiorari to the case in January 2021, with oral arguments heard on April 26, 2021.

The Court issued its decision on May 24, 2021, reversing the D.C. Circuit Court's ruling and remanding the case for further review. In the unanimous opinion, the court ruled that Section 113(f)(3)(B) did not apply to the consent agreement that Guam had made with the EPA, and thus the three-year statute of limitations from Section 113(f)(3)(B) did not apply; as such, Guam had the ability to pursue action against the government as allotted by Section 107(a). Justice Clarence Thomas wrote the opinion, focusing on the statutory interpretation of CERCLA. The court held that, despite possible "functional overlap", the government taking "remedial measures ... under another environmental statue" does not necessarily settle its liability under CERCLA.

The decision has a potential impact on a number of pending lawsuits filed by states and local entities against the U.S. government and large companies to try to seek some recovery for the costs for cleanup of Superfund sites, as these suits had followed similar patterns of interaction between Guam and the EPA.
