= Sumay Cemetery =

Historic cemetery in Guam

- U.S. National Register of Historic Places
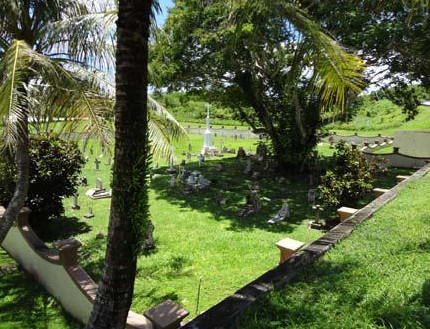
- Undated US Navy photo

- Location within Guam
- Location: Sumay Dr. and Guam Highway 1, Comnavmarians, Santa Rita, Guam
- Coordinates: 13°26′04″N 144°39′07″E
- Area: less than one acre
- Built: 1911
- NRHP reference No.: 99001184
- Added to NRHP: October 8, 1999

The Sumay Cemetery is a historic cemetery at the junction of Sumay Drive and Guam Highway 1 on the grounds of Naval Base Guam, located on the west side of the United States territory of Guam. It is a roughly square cemetery taking up about 0.7 acres (0.28 ha), and is surrounded by a decorative wall with gate. The cemetery was probably established in the late 19th century; its oldest legible marker bears the date 1911. It is the oldest known historic-era cemetery on the island, and is the only tangible reminder of the village of Sumay, which effectively ceased to exist when the naval base took over the area and its citizens were relocated to the village of Santa Rita.

The cemetery was listed on the National Register of Historic Places in 1999.

== See also ==
- National Register of Historic Places listings in Guam
