= Lonfit River =

Location
- Country: Guam

Physical characteristics
- Mouth
  - coordinates: 13.4350000°N 144.7530556°E

The Lonfit River is a river in the United States territory of Guam. It empties into the Pago River. Contaminants from the Ordot Dump in Chalan Pago-Ordot, Guam, which was closed in 2011, leached into the river.

== See also ==
- List of rivers of Guam
