= Chalan Pago-Ordot, Guam =

Coordinates: 13°26′26″N 144°46′17″E

Chalan Pago-Ordot Chålan Pågu-Otdot
- Village
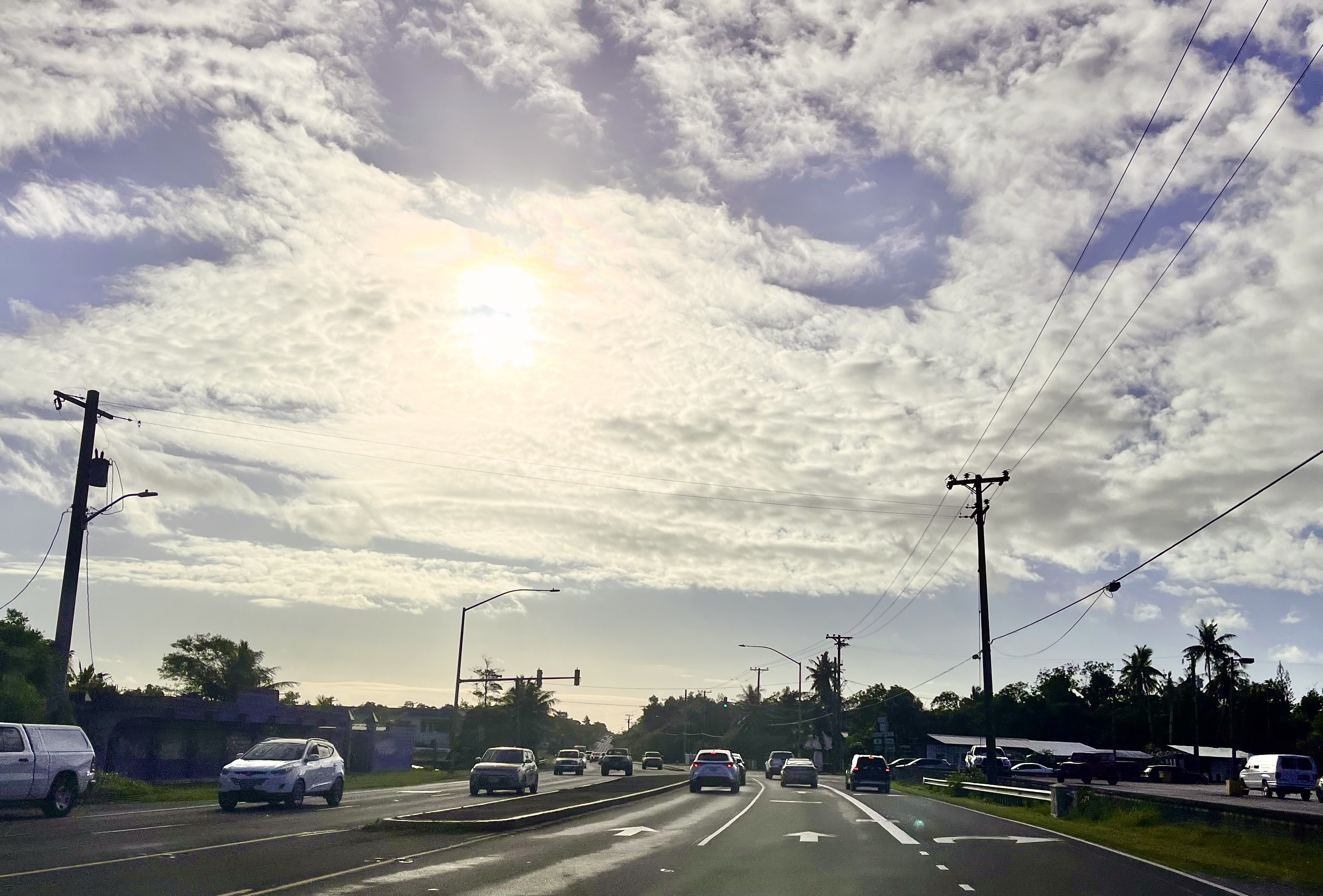

- Location of Chalan Pago-Ordot within the Territory of Guam.
- Country: United States
- Territory: Guam

Government
  - Mayor: Wayne S.N. Santos (D)

Population (2020)
  - Total: 7,064
  - Ethnic groups: (as of 2,000) 90% Chamorro Micronesian
- Time zone: UTC+10 (ChST)
- Village Flower: Pink Catharanthus roseus / Chichirica; Hibiscus tiliaceus / Pago

Historical population
Census	Pop.	Note	%±
1960	1,835		—
1970	2,931		59.7%
1980	3,120		6.4%
1990	4,451		42.7%
2000	5,923		33.1%
2010	6,822		15.2%
2020	7,064		3.5%

Chalan Pago-Ordot (Chamorro: Chålan Pågu-Otdot) is a village in the United States territory of Guam, containing the communities of Chalan Pago and Ordot. It is located in the eastern-central part of the island and is part of the Kattan (Eastern) District. The village's population has increased slightly since the island's 2010 census.

== Etymology ==
Pågu is the Chamorro word for the wild tree Hibiscus tiliaceus, while "chålan"' means "road". The name Chalan Pago is named after the path from Hagåtña to the Spanish village at Pago Bay. Ordot comes from the word otdot, or ant.

In World War II, the Japanese used the area as a supply depot during their occupation of the island. Ordot is also the site of the controversial Ordot Landfill, first constructed by the U.S. Navy in the 1940s, but now full and in violation of United States Environmental Protection Agency (EPA) regulations. It was added to the National Priorities List in 1983 by the EPA, with the Navy as a potential contributor to it. The landfill was forced closed in 2011 and Guam agreed to pay for remediation of the surrounding area atop implemented a cap on the landfill from a prior 2004 consent decree. Guam had been able to successfully initiate action to recover a portion of the estimated $160 million costs for this cleanup from the US government as a result of the Supreme Court case Guam v. United States in 2021.

== Demographics ==
The U.S. Census Bureau has the municipality in multiple census-designated places: Chalan Pago, and Ordot.

== Education ==
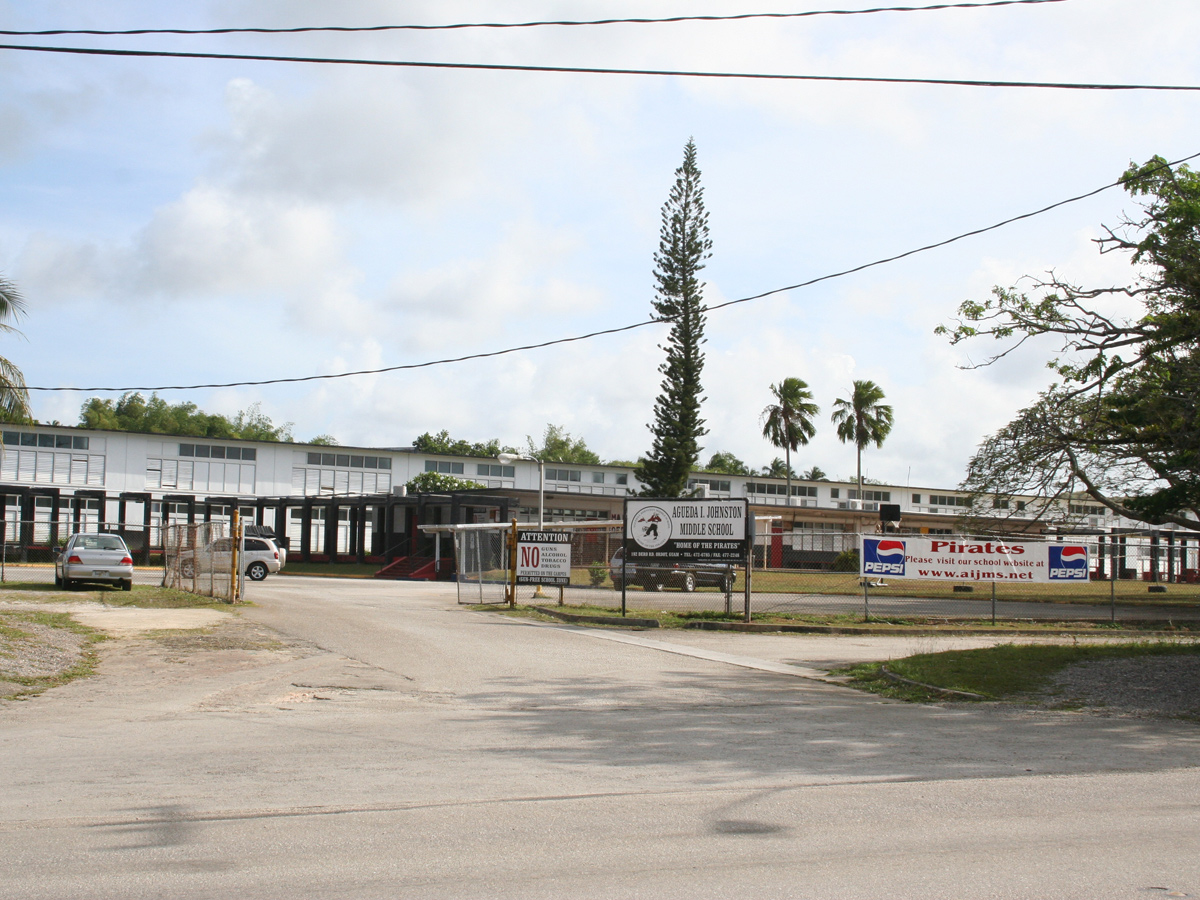
Agueda Johnston Middle School

The Guam Public School System serves the island. Ordot/Chalan Pago Elementary School and Agueda Johnston Middle School are located in Chalan-Pago-Ordot. Johnston is located in Ordot; originally it was named George Washington Junior High School. George Washington High School in Mangilao serves the village as a secondary school.

In regards to the Department of Defense Education Activity (DoDEA), Chalan Pago-Ordot is divided between two school transportation zones. People living north of Guam Highway 4 are zoned to Andersen Elementary and Andersen Middle School, while people living south of Guam Highway 4 are zoned to McCool Elementary and McCool Middle School. Guam High School is the island's sole DoDEA high school.

Father Dueñas Memorial School is in the area. St. Thomas Aquinas Catholic High School was open 2008–2015.

== Government ==
Commissioner of Chalan Pago-Ordot
Name	Term begin	Term end
Francisco L.G. Valenzuela	1956	1964
Thomas B. Anderson	1964	1969
Francisco C. Carbullido	1969	January 1, 1973

Mayor of Chalan Pago-Ordot
Name	Party	Term begin	Term end
Francisco C. Carbullido	Republican	January 1, 1973	January 3, 1977
Vicente S. San Nicolas	Democratic	January 3, 1977	January 6, 1997
Rossanna D. San Miguel	Democratic	January 6, 1997	January 1, 2001
Vicente I. Aguon	Democratic	January 1, 2001	January 3, 2005
Pedro I. Borja	Republican	January 3, 2005	January 5, 2009
Jessy C. Gogue	Democratic	January 5, 2009	January 4, 2025
Wayne S.N. Santos	Democratic	January 4, 2025	present

== See also ==
- Villages of Guam
