= Pago Bay =

Bay in Guam

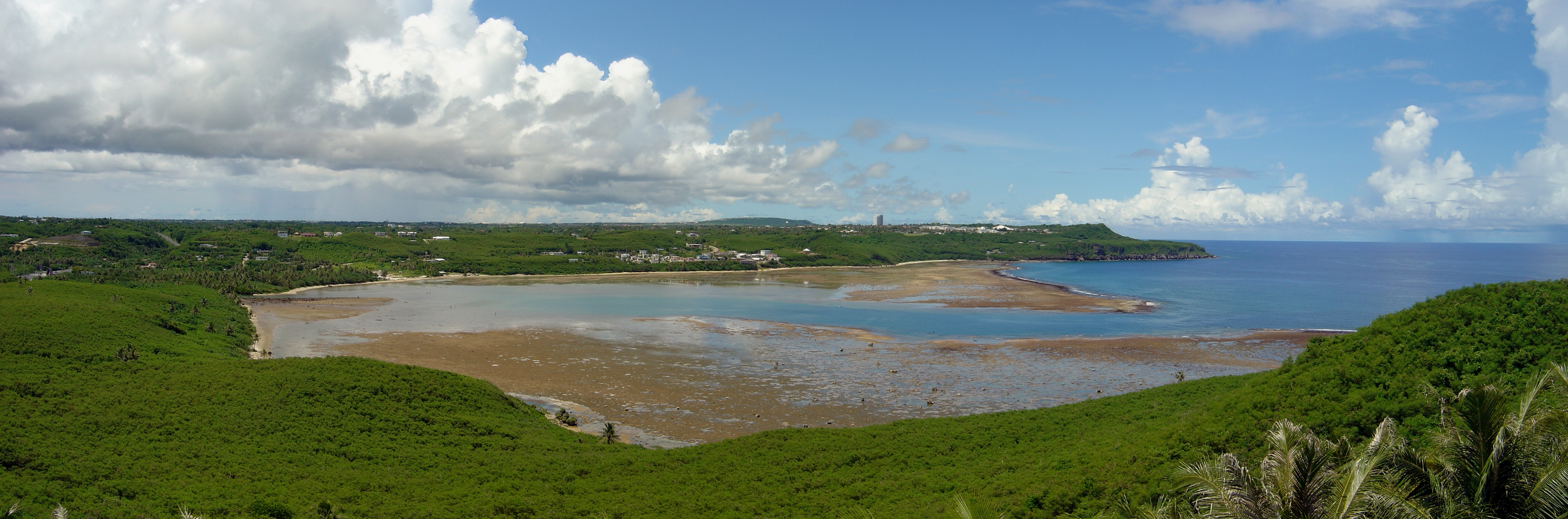
- Waters of the Pago River flow through Pago Bay's shallow reef flat at low tide. Seen from the south, prior to recent shoreline construction.

- Location within Guam
- Location: Chalan Pago-Ordot, Yona, and Mangilao, Guam
- Coordinates: 13.42°N 144.79°E
- Etymology: CHamoru for Hibiscus tiliaceus
- Primary inflows: Pago River
- Ocean/sea sources: Pacific Ocean
- Surface area: 1.5 square kilometres (370 acres)

Pago Bay is the largest bay on the U.S. territory of Guam, located at the mouth of Pago River on the island's eastern coast. There is extensive evidence of CHamoru settlement before Spanish colonization during the late seventeenth century. During the Spanish-Chamorro Wars, the Spanish transferred the populations of Tinian and Aguigan to the village of Pago (Pågu). However, a smallpox epidemic in 1856 killed much of the village's population and the Spanish moved survivors to other villages, leaving the bay shoreline largely uninhabited. The bay is popular with fishermen and recreationalists, and was the site of new housing development in the 2000s.

== Geography and ecology ==
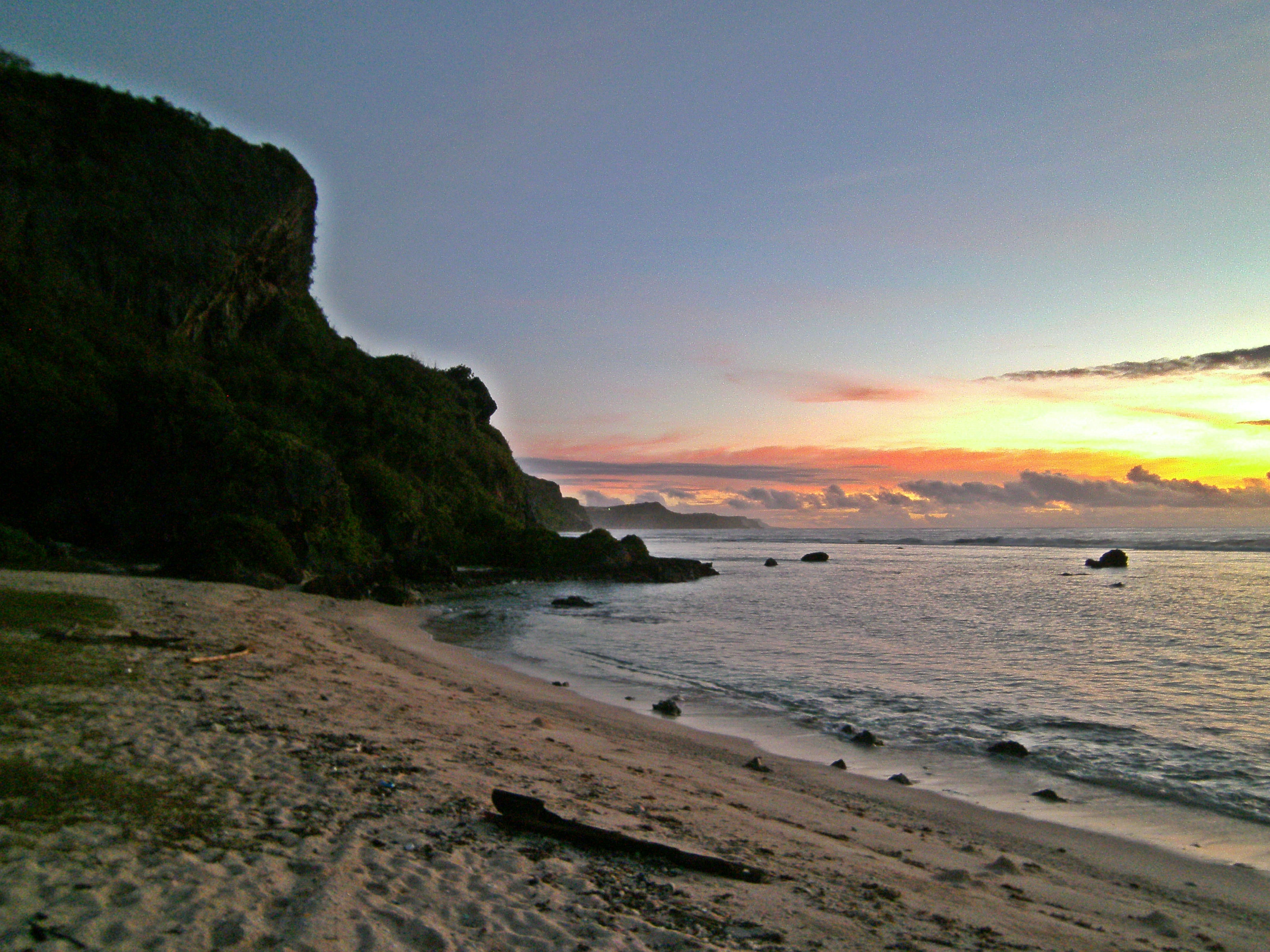
Sunrise at Pago Bay, 2014

Pago Bay is 1.5 square kilometres (370 acres). The mouth of the Pago River is along the southwestern shore of Pago Bay. The Pago River, which is itself fed by the Lonfit and Sigua Rivers, is the boundary between the village of Chalan Pago-Ordot to the north and Yona to the south. The shoreline of Mangilao, notably the Marine Lab of the University of Guam lies along the northeast bay, outside of the fringing reef. The east of the bay opens to the Pacific Ocean. The average annual rainfall is 288.29 centimetres (113.50 in), with a mean tidal range of 0.5 metres (1 ft 8 in). The bay is exposed to the easterly and northeasterly trade winds. The Frank Perez Park, a public recreation area, is located northeast of the river mouth.

Pago Bay may be divided into four habitat zones, three of which are features of the fringing reef: the Pago River channel; the shallow reef flats around the channel; a reef crest at the outer edge that dissipates most of the waves coming in from the open Pacific; and a fore reef, descending from the reef crest into the ocean. The river channel is about 140 metres (460 ft) wide, deepening to about 30 metres (98 ft) at the reef crest. The channel is largely uncolonized benthos of sand and mud. The reef crest and reef flats are shallow, with some areas exposed at low tide. These areas are colonized by turf algae, crustose coralline algae and seaweed, with small areas of seagrass shoreward. The fore reef has between 10-50% coral cover and a slope of 4.7-8.9° between 0 and 20 metres (0 and 66 ft).

== History ==
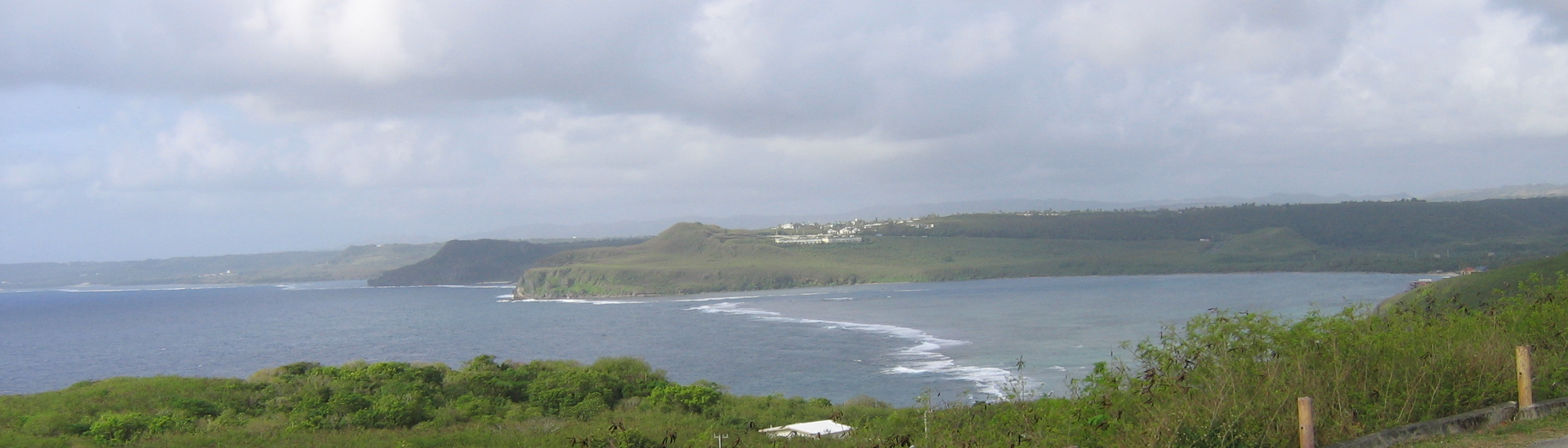
View of Yona south from the University of Guam across Pago Bay

Pago likely derives its name from the CHamoru word Pågu for Hibiscus tiliaceus, a flowering hibiscus that grew wild in the area. There are many archeological finds along both sides of the mouth of the river from the Latte Period (900-1521), including an earth-oven, human burials, pottery fragments, shells ornaments, and many other artifacts. Two pieces of ambergris with similar shapes are the only indication in Guam's archeological record that ambergris was used by ancient CHamorus for some purpose.

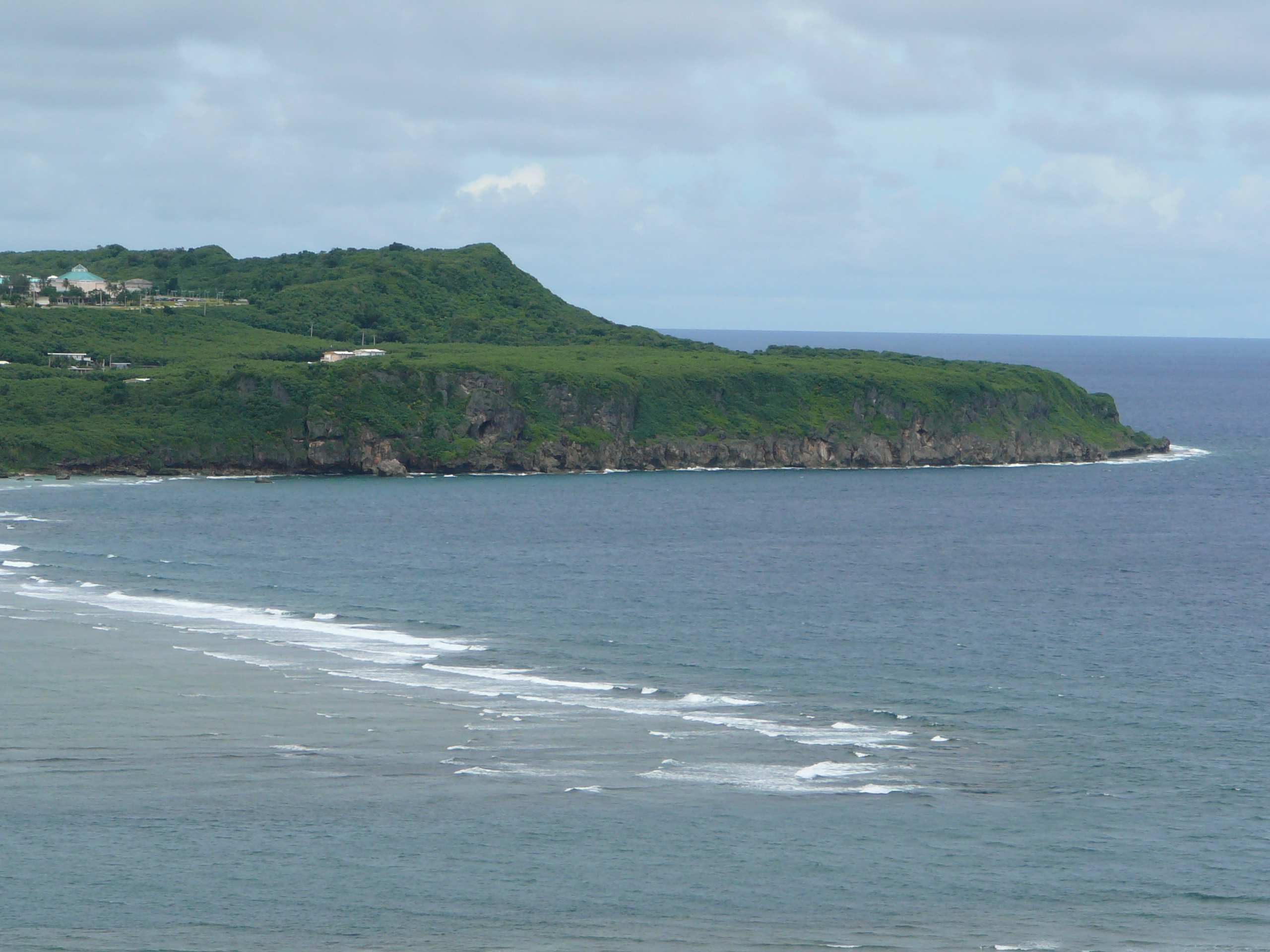
View of the Mangilao headland forming the northern boundary of Pago Bay

During the Spanish-Chamorro Wars of the late seventeenth century, the Spanish colonizers relocated CHamorus into centralized towns, a process of villagization to better control the population known as the Reducción. By 1680, Pago was one of seven towns on Guam. Pago and Ritidian were the centers of the final large-scale uprising against Spanish rule in 1683. In 1689, the enshrinement of Santa Marian Kamalen at the church in Pago was attended by Ignacio Hineti, Antonio Ayhi and other prominent pro-Spanish CHamoru Christians. As the Reducción of the Mariana Islands continued, the Spanish relocated thousands of CHamorus from the northern islands of Tinian and Aguigan to six villages on Guam, including Pago. The name of Chalan Pago, a community in the village of Chalan Pago-Ordot, translates as "Pago Road," as it lay between the capitol Hagåtña and Pago.

In 1856, Guam experienced a smallpox epidemic that killed an estimated 60% of the population. The population of the entire island fell to 3,644. Pago was abandoned, with the survivors moving to other villages. The area was briefly used as a leper colony in the early 1890s.

=== Folk tale: the giant fish that ate Guam ===
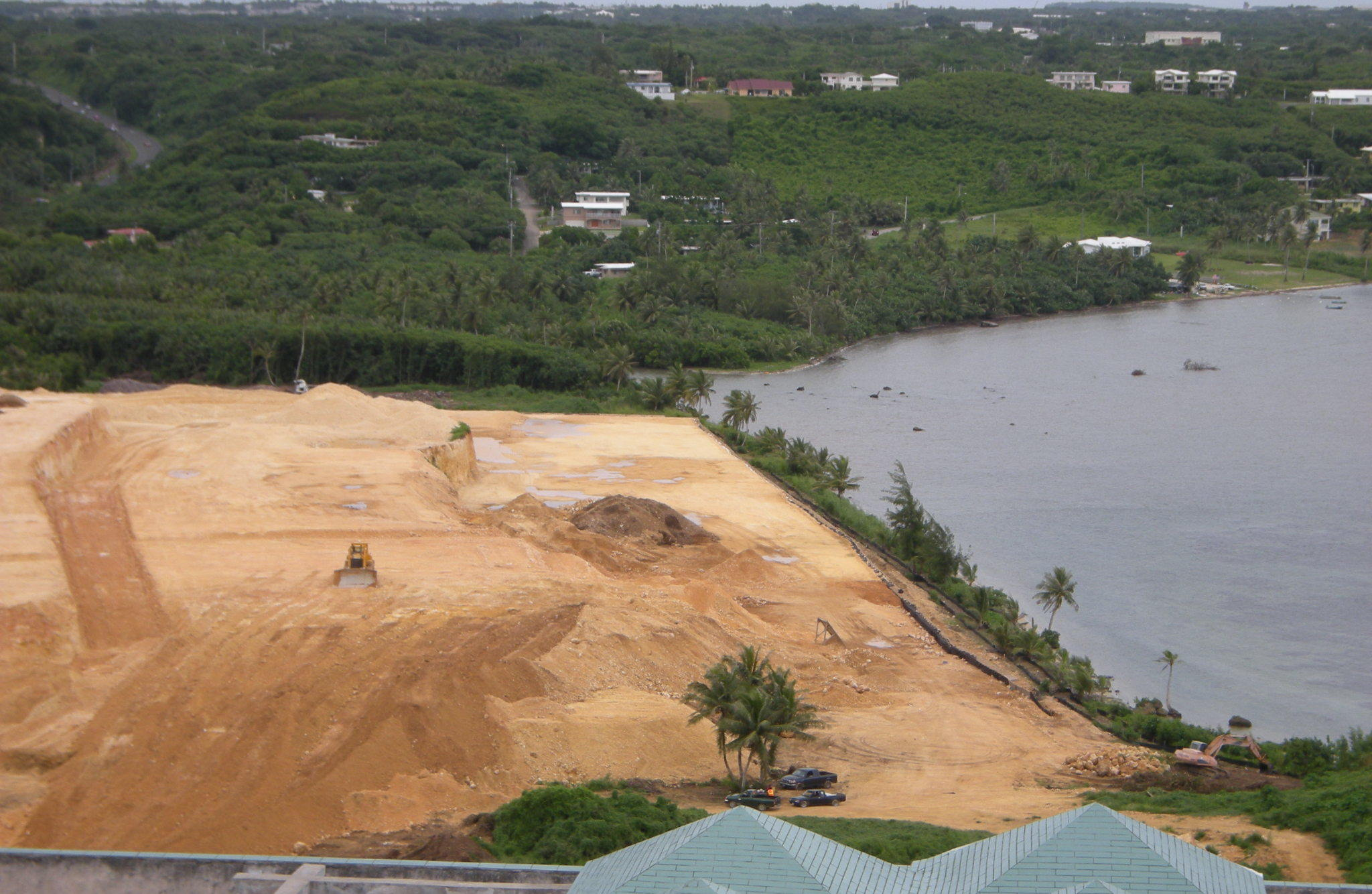
Land clearing on the south side of the Pago River in 2008

Pago Bay is integral to a CHamoru folktale explaining why Guam has a narrow central "waist." A long time ago, goes the story, fishermen at Pago and across the island at Hagåtña Bay noticed that their bays were growing larger, narrowing the land between Pago and Hagåtña every day. One morning, a fishermen in Pago Bay discovered that a giant fish that was eating chunks of land, causing the bays to grow further apart. All of the strong men and fishermen of the island could not find and kill the fish. Meanwhile, the young women who washed clothes (which dates the story to after the Spanish introduction of clothes) at the spring at the head of the Hagåtña River scented the clothes with fresh lemon, leaving the water covered in lemon peels. One day, a maiden in Pago noticed lemon peels floating in Pago Bay and realized that the giant fish had eaten a tunnel underneath the island between Pago and Hagåtña. The maidens gathered at Hagåtña Springs and cut off their long black hair to make a magical net and started to sing. They sang for hours and the fish was entranced and came to the surface, where the maidens captured it with their net. This is how they saved Guam and why the island has such a narrow middle.

=== Modern history ===
A land use application in 2008 to build 98 house lots in southern Pago Bay in Yona, which evolved into a proposed 300-unit building with 15-story towers, led to a decade of controversy. Protesters stated that the towers would block the iconic views along the Pago River Bridge and Guam Highway 4, with one Chamoru man bringing up the ancient legend: "It's a 21st century dangkolo na guihan, giant fish, makakanno I tano gi Pago Bay, eating away at Pago Bay land." By 2017, the proposed project had become the Pago Bay Ocean Resort with two condominiums up to 12 stories, removing the proposed marina and creation of an artificial sandy beach. The Guam Land Use Commission approved a less aggressive project. However, the developers have run afoul of regulators regarding reburial of ancient human remains and missing deadlines to give updates to the Guam Land Use Commission.

The University of Guam began a water quality data collection and management plan for the Pago Bay watershed in 2015. Called "Builders of a Better Bay," it uses student researchers to collect data on turbidity and water level, as well as interview historical experts about the cultural significance of the area.

In February 2021, a breath-hold spearfisherman drowned and was recovered in the bay.
