= Mohamed Bradja =

Footballer (born 1969)

Personal information
- Date of birth: 16 November 1969 (age 56)
- Place of birth: Troyes, France
- Height: 1.75 m (5 ft 9 in)
- Position: Centre-back

Team information
- Current team: Troyes (assistant head coach)

Youth career
- Troyes Aube Football
- 1986–1988: Valenciennes

Senior career*
Years	Team	Apps	(Gls)
1988–2003	Troyes		

International career
2001–2002	Algeria	10	

Managerial career
- 2015: Troyes
- 2016: Troyes
- * Club domestic league appearances and goals

Mohamed Bradja (born 16 November 1969) is a football coach and former player who is the assistant head coach of Ligue 1 club Troyes. A centre-back, he spent his entire playing career with Troyes. Born in France, he represented Algeria at international level, participating at the 2002 African Cup of Nations.

== Club career ==
Born in Troyes, Bradja began playing football at his hometown club. Due to the lack of stability after the bankruptcy of Troyes Aube Football, he left in 1986 to join Valenciennes as a trainee.

After two seasons, failing to win a professional contract, Bradja returned to Troyes and to the newly created Troyes, at regional level. He helped the club in achieving promotions from National 2 to Ligue 2 in only six years. He gained a professional contract with the club, and, three years after, secured the promotion of the club to the French top flight, Ligue 1, for the first time in almost 20 years. Even if he played less during the next seasons, he kept his place in the first team. With Troyes, he also played European football, winning the UEFA Intertoto Cup in 2001 by beating Newcastle United. He ended his career at the end of the 2002–03 season, when Troyes finished bottom of the Ligue 1 and were relegated to Ligue 2. He also captained the team on several occasions.

He was nicknamed "Momo".

== International career ==
Bradja represented Algeria at international level. He played in a 4–1 loss against France. In 2002, he participated at the African Cup of Nations. In total, he made ten appearances.

== Coaching career ==
One of the longest servants of the club, he was offered several roles in the technical staff after his retirement. He was a scout for the club, before being appointed first-team coach during the management of Ludovic Batelli.

He was once again assistant manager after the comeback of Jean-Marc Furlan in 2010. In December 2015, he became interim manager after Furlan's dismissal.

== Honours ==
Troyes

- UEFA Intertoto Cup: 2001
