= Pago River =

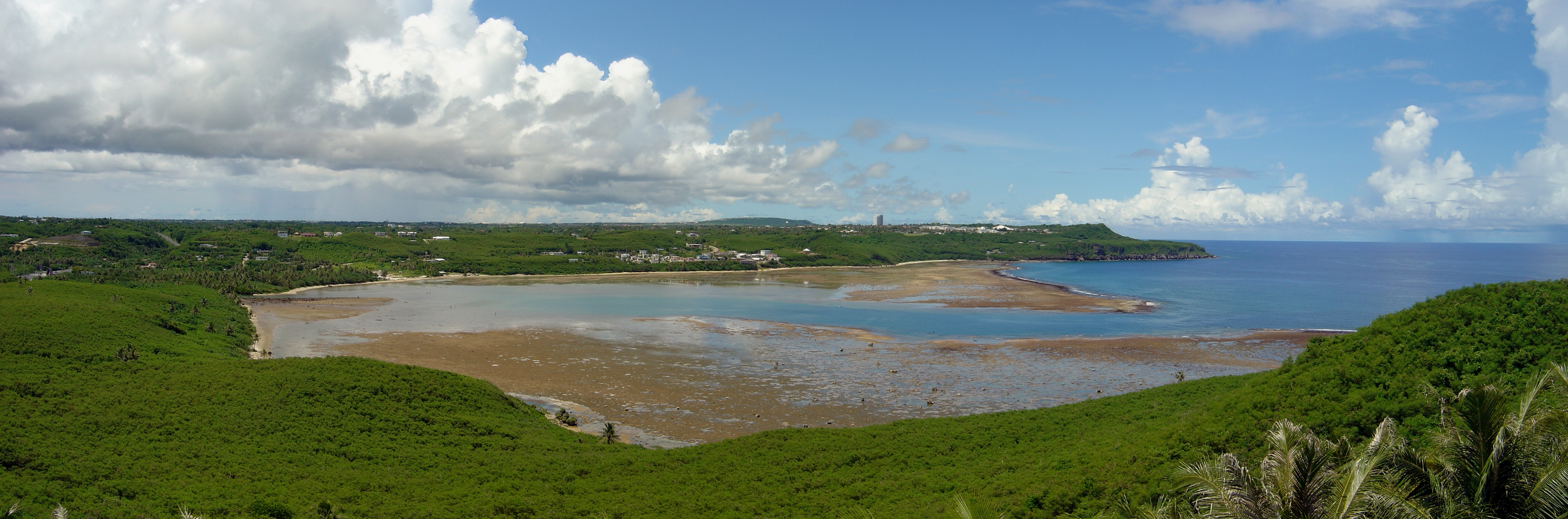
- The Pago River empties into Pago Bay

- Location within Guam

Physical characteristics
- Mouth
  - coordinates: 13.4202778°N 144.7816667°E

The Pago River is one of the longest rivers in the United States territory of Guam. It is fed by two inland rivers, Lonfit River and Sigua River. Rising close to the west coast, it traverses the island, flowing into the sea at Pago Bay in the central east coast. The village of Yona lies just to the south of the river's mouth.

== See also ==
- List of rivers of Guam
