= Pago International =

Fruit juice brand

Pago is a fruit juice producer operating internationally in the fruit juice sector. The company has been producing fruit juice for more than 100 years. In the past, Pago as a member of the Brau Union Group, belongs to the Dutch Heineken Group. Heineken sold Pago to Granini Juices. In the Netherlands Pago was distributed by Pago Nederland. They lost a lawsuit with Vrumona in 2013. Vrumona is doing now distribution in the Netherlands. In 2008, Pago sold 71 million litres worldwide, equating to 260 million bottles. The Pago group employs 292 persons worldwide.

== History ==
The company was founded in 1888 by the brothers Franz and Jakob Pagitz, who had then the idea of putting ‘liquid fruits’ in a bottle. In 1949, the brand name was born: derived from the first three letters of the founder's family name “Pagitz” and the first letter of the German word for fruit “Obst”. At the end of 1977, Brau-Beteiligungs AG bought 60 percent of Pago Fruchtsäfte GmbH and acquired the remaining shares in the former family business two years later. In turn, BBAG, and thus Pago, became part of Heineken International.

With the foundation of the first subsidiary in Italy in 1989, the internationalisation of the brand started. In the following years, Pago conquered other countries and within a few years founded more and more subsidiaries in Europe. Beginning with the foundation of Pago France in 1992, Pago, step by step, conquered the Spanish, and Croatian markets.

== Pack types and flavours ==
Apart from the 0,20 litre glass bottles, Pago flavours are available in different pack types and packsizes. Pago can also be obtained in PET bottles. The Pago PET range consists of the 0,20 litre, 0,33 litre and 0,75 litre PET bottles.

The Pago product portfolio currently consists of 37 flavours. Depending on the flavour, the juices and nectars are available in glass and/or PET bottles. ACE (Orange-Carrot-Lemon), Apple, Apricot, Banana, Bilberry, Blackcurrant, Blood Orange-Lime, Cloudy Apple, Cloudy Cherry, Cranberry, Grapefruit, Honey Melon, Kiwi, Lemon Lime, Mango, Multifruit Tropical, Multifruit Tropical Red, Orange, Peach, Pear, Pear-Pineapple, Pineapple, Pink Grapefruit, Plum ACE, Raspberry, Strawberry, Tomato, White Grape. Smoothies: Red Berry Mix, Gardenfruit, Mango-Maracuja, Superfruit (limited edition) Sparkling: Apple, Apricot, Mango, Orange Passion fruit.

== Production plant ==
Pago juices are produced at the factories located in Klagenfurt (Pago Fruchsäfte) in Austria and at La Selva del Camp in Tarragona, in Spain.

The headquarters of Pago (Pago International GmbH) is located in southern Austria, Carinthia - Klagenfurt. Pago International GmbH has subsidiaries in the following European countries:

- Austria: Marketing Sales Austria
- Italy: Pago Italia s.r.l.
- Croatia: Pago Croatia d.o.o.
- France: Pago France s.r.l.
- Spain: Pago Iberica de Bebidas S.L.

In 2012, Pago was distributed by WaverleyTBS in the UK, however, WaverleyTBS entered administration later that year. Since 2015, it has been distributed by Eckes Granini. It is distributed by Stanic Group in Croatia.
