= Sigua River =

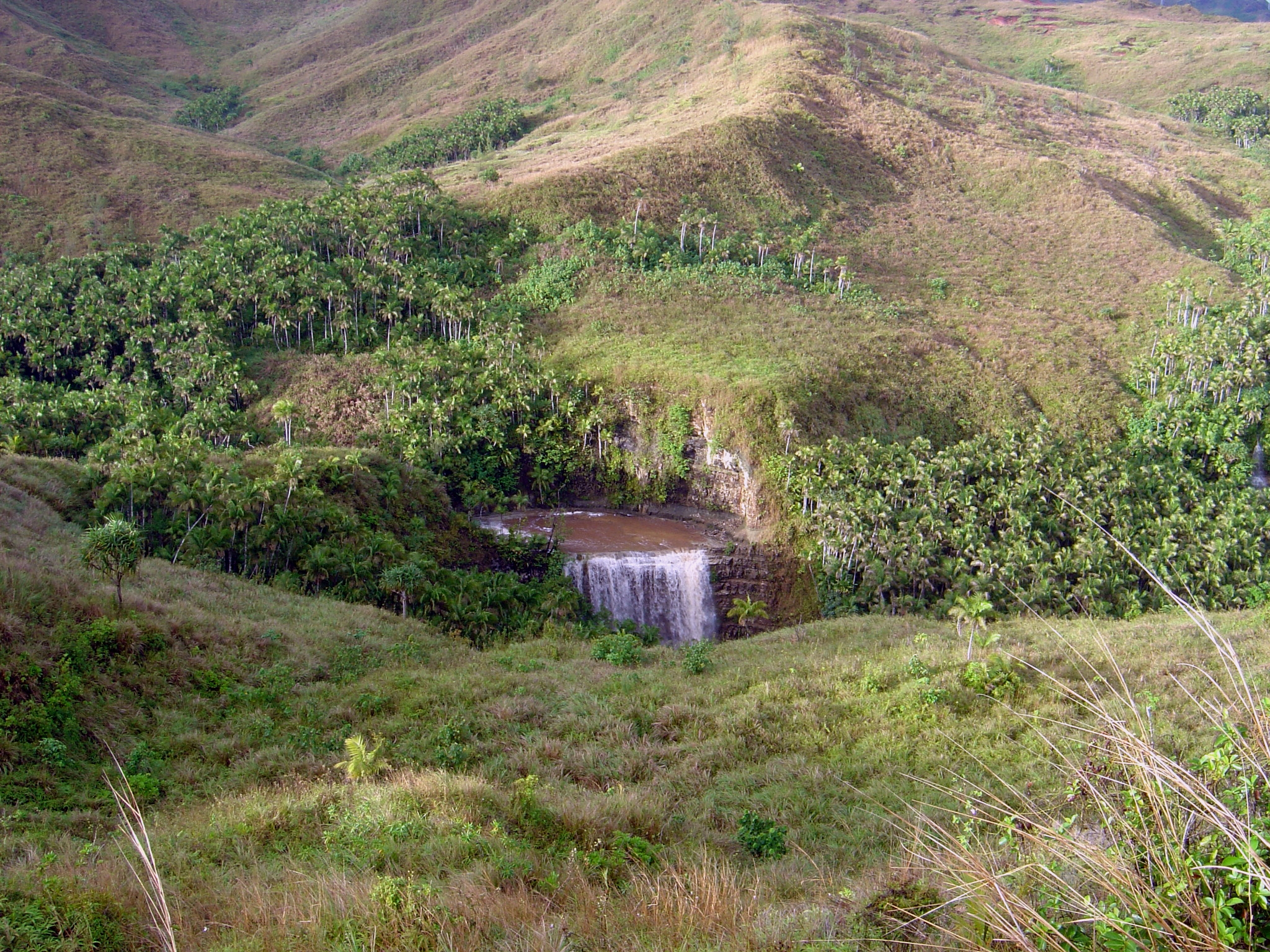
- Lower Sigua Falls in Yona

Location
- Country: Guam

Physical characteristics
- Source
  - location: Mount Alutum
- Mouth
  - location: Pago river
  - coordinates: 13.4350000°N 144.7533333°E

The Sigua River is a river in the United States territory of Guam. It empties into the Pago River.

== See also ==
- List of rivers of Guam
