= Government of Guam =

Presidential Republic; United States territory

The Government of Guam (GovGuam) is a presidential representative democratic system, whereby the president is the head of state and the governor is head of government, and of a multi-party system. Guam is an organized, unincorporated territory of the United States with policy relations between Guam and the US under the jurisdiction of the Office of Insular Affairs.

== Executive branch ==
Main office-holders
Office	Name	Party	Since
Governor	Lou Leon Guerrero	Democrat	2 January 2023
Lieutenant Governor	Josh Tenorio	Democrat	2 January 2023

The governor and lieutenant governor are elected on the same ticket by popular vote for four-year terms. The last gubernatorial election on Guam was in November 2022.

The governor and lieutenant governor are chosen jointly by direct vote and hold office for a term of four years and until their successors are elected and qualified. Elections are held on the first Tuesday of November.

=== Agencies ===
==== Line agencies ====
- Guam Department of Agriculture
- Guam Department of Chamorro Affairs
  - Guam Public Library
- Guam Department of Corrections
- Guam Department of Land Management
- Guam Department of Public Health and Social Services
- Guam Department of Public Works
- Guam Department of Mental Health and Substance Abuse
- Guam Department of Parks and Recreation
- Guam Department of Youth Affairs
- Guam Environmental Protection Agency
- Guam Police Department
- Office of the Attorney General of Guam

==== Semi-autonomous agencies ====
- Guam Department of Education

==== Autonomous agencies ====
- Guam International Airport Authority
- Guam Memorial Hospital Authority
- Guam Power Authority
- Guam Regional Transit Authority
- Guam Visitors Bureau
- Guam Waterworks Authority

==== Commissions ====
- Chamorro Land Trust Commission
- Guam Ancestral Lands Commission
- Guam Election Commission

== Legislative branch ==
The Guam Legislature, I Liheslaturan Guåhan, is a unicameral body consisting of 15 senators. Senators are elected at-large to serve two-year terms without term limits.

The current 37th Guam Legislature (2022–present) has a 9–6 Democratic majority led by Speaker Frank Blas.

== Judicial branch ==
On August 1, 1950, President Harry S. Truman signed into law the Guam Organic Act of 1950 which gave Guamanians certain rights and protections under the U.S. Constitution. The people of Guam were afforded the opportunity to set and administer policy and laws for the island of Guam. Included in this was the Judicial Branch of the Government of Guam.

In 1950 as part of the Judiciary Act, a judiciary reorganization bill was prepared to strengthen the island court system. Judge Albert B. Maris, then Chairman of the United States Judicial Conference, Judge of the Third Circuit Court of Appeals, and Chief Judge of the Emergency Court of Appeals, came to Guam to assist in the review of the court system and the preparation of the judiciary bill. He was assisted by Attorney John Bohn in the development of an act that vested in the District Court of Guam territorial jurisdiction in civil cases having a value of more than $2,000 and, in criminal cases, jurisdiction over all felonies.

Known as Public Law 17, the "Judiciary Act" abolished the Justice Court, the Traffic Branch of the Police Court, and the Court of Appeals. The duties of the latter were assumed by the District Court. Before the Act, the court system consisted of the Court of Appeals, the Island Court and the Police Court. The reorganization reduced the number of courts to the District Court of Guam, the Island Court, the Police Court and the Commissioners Court.

The Judiciary Act gave the Island Court of Guam jurisdiction over misdemeanors and civil cases having a value of less than $2,000 and created a Police Court with jurisdiction over misdemeanor cases in which the maximum penalty did not exceed a fine of $100 or imprisonment of six months, or both.

The Act also created a Commissioner’s Court to be presided over by the commissioner of each municipality to deal with petty offenses for which the maximum punishment did not exceed $5. The law also defined the powers, qualifications, and disqualifications of judges and referees and specified the duties of court clerks, reporters, marshals, the attorney general, and the island attorney or prosecuting attorney. It provided requisites for admission to the practice of law and for a probation system.

After 1950, the District Court of Guam, which had the same jurisdiction as a District Court in the US over federal questions, was established. For the first time, the judiciary in Guam, exercised its powers independent of the executive branch. However, a dual judicial structure began—the District Court with responsibility both for federal and local cases, and the Island Court established by the Guam Legislature with responsibility strictly for local cases.

In 1974, Public Law 12-85, the Court Reorganization Act would substantially alter the judicial jurisdiction of the local island court and rename it the Superior Court of Guam. The Superior Court was given jurisdiction over all cases arising out of Guam laws. The District Court retained its appellate function. Under the act establishing the Superior Court of Guam, the title of senior judge was changed to Presiding Judge of the Superior Court. Chief Judge of the Island Court Joaquin Perez became Guam’s first Presiding Judge.

In 1973, Guam's leaders made their first attempt at creating a Guam Supreme Court but the Court's existence was short lived.

A 1977 ruling by the U.S. Supreme Court—Territory of Guam v. Olsen, 431 U.S. 195—found Guam's Supreme Court to be inorganic. In Olsen, the Court held that Guam's Organic Act did not authorize the transfer of appellate jurisdiction from the appellate division of the District Court of Guam to a locally established appellate court.

In response to Guam v. Olsen, Congress passed the 1984 Omnibus Territories Act. The Act amended Guam's Organic Act allowing the Guam Legislature to create an appellate court to hear all cases in Guam over which any court established by the Constitution and laws of the United States does not have exclusive jurisdiction, with the provision that for the first 15 years after establishment that of that court, the 9th Circuit Court would still maintain judicial overview in the appeals process. In all other aspects, the appeals process would be the same as each state. The Act, however, did not provide a structure for a newly created judicial system once the appellate court was established. Nor did the Act mention that the responsibility should be left to the Guam Legislature.

In 1992, the 21st Guam Legislature unanimously passed Public Law 21-147, the Frank G. Lujan Memorial Court Reorganization Act. The Act reestablished the Supreme Court of Guam to serve as the highest appellate court on the island. The author of the Frank G. Lujan Memorial Court Reorganization Act stated, in testimony submitted to the Committee in 1997, that it was the intent of the Guam Legislature to make the Supreme Court of Guam the highest local court and be vested with those powers traditionally held and exercised by the highest court of a jurisdiction.

In authorizing the creation of a Guam Supreme Court however, the U.S. Congress had unintentionally left the newly created court subordinate to Guam's other two branches of government. Guam's executive and legislative branches were established in the Organic Act, which in lieu of an adopted constitution serves to provide the framework and powers for the island's executive and legislative branches. Because the judiciary was established in Guam law, some theorized that the judiciary was therefore subject to changes based upon shifts in the majority control of Guam's legislature. In March 1996, hours after the first Justices of the Supreme Court of Guam were confirmed, the 23rd Guam Legislature passed Bill 404, which removed certain inherent powers from the Supreme Court. A second bill, Bill 494, aimed to strip the supervisory jurisdiction of the Supreme Court over all lower courts. That bill was debated, but tabled by the Legislative Committee on the Judiciary. Eight months later, the Legislature attached the contents of the shelved Bill 494 as a "midnight" rider to Bill 776. The legislation passed, but was vetoed by the Governor. An override attempt failed by only a slim margin.

After years of lobbying to confirm the status of the Supreme Court of Guam as the ultimate court of appeals for the island, on October 30, 2004, H.R. 2400 (Public Law No. 108-378) became federal law. It amended the Organic Act of Guam to revise the local judicial structure of Guam to vest judicial authority, not only in the District Court of Guam, but also in "a unified judicial system composed of: (1) an appellate court designated as the "Supreme Court of Guam"; (2) a trial court designated as the "Superior Court of Guam"; and (3) such other lower local courts as may have been or may hereafter be established by the laws of Guam."

Further, Public Law No. 108-378 authorized the Supreme Court of Guam to create divisions of the Superior Court and other local courts of Guam, and stated that the Supreme Court of Guam "shall be the highest court of the judicial branch of Guam (excluding the District Court of Guam) and shall: (1) have original jurisdiction over proceedings necessary to protect its appellate jurisdiction and supervisory authority and such other original jurisdiction as the laws of Guam may provide; (2) have jurisdiction to hear appeals over any cause in Guam decided by the Superior Court of Guam or other courts established under the laws of Guam; (3) have jurisdiction to issue all orders and writs in aid of its appellate, supervisory, and original jurisdiction, including those orders necessary for the supervision of the judicial branch of Guam; (4) have supervisory jurisdiction over the Superior Court of Guam and all other courts of the judicial branch of Guam; (5) hear and determine appeals by a panel of three of the justices of the Supreme Court of Guam and a concurrence of two such justices shall be necessary to a decision of the Supreme Court of Guam on the merits of an appeal; (6) make and promulgate rules governing the administration of the judiciary and court practice and procedure, including appeal en banc procedures; and (7) govern attorney and judicial ethics and the practice of law in Guam."

In January 2002, the Ninth Circuit Court of Appeals affirmed a Supreme Court of Guam decision to invalidate a Guam law, based upon a claim the Governor of Guam pocket-vetoed the enacting legislation. This decision allowed the Supreme Court to reestablish itself, administratively, as the highest court within the Judiciary. A Unified Judiciary Committee, composed of the Chief Justice of Guam, two Supreme Court Associate Justices, the Presiding Judge of the Superior Court, one Judge of the Superior Court, the Administrator of the Supreme Court, and the Administrator of the Superior Court, has since been established by the Supreme Court of Guam.

On March 15, 2006, the Ninth Circuit Court of Appeals dismissed a case brought by Attorney General Douglas Moylan against Governor Felix Camacho on the basis of its lack of jurisdiction, confirming for the first time that the Ninth Circuit no longer would review the Supreme Court of Guam's decisions. This was the final transition of the Supreme Court of Guam from its probationary status under the original permissive federal legislation, to the equal of other states' highest courts, since it meant appeals from decisions of the Supreme Court of Guam would be subject to review only if accepted for such by the United States Supreme Court.

=== Federal courts (U.S. government) ===
The U.S. District Court for the District of Guam is one of three territorial courts within the federal court system. The others are the district courts for the Commonwealth of the Northern Mariana Islands, also located within the Ninth Circuit, and the U.S. Territory of the Virgin Islands, located within the Third Circuit. Territorial courts exercise the same jurisdiction as U.S. district courts, as well as local jurisdiction.

Guam's Federal District Court is housed on the 4th floor of the U.S. Courthouse, 520 West Soledad Avenue, in Hagåtña, Guam. Its lone federal District Court chief judge is one of the few Article IV territorial judgeships, appointed by the president of the United States and confirmed by the United States Senate to a ten-year term. The current chief judge of the U.S. District Court of Guam is The Hon. Frances Marie Tydingco-Gatewood, the first female Chamorro federal judge for the United States.

Other former district judges include:

- The Hon. Paul D. Shriver (1946–1956, first chief judge of the District Court of Guam; 1961–1970)
- The Hon. Eugene Gilmartin (1956–1961, died in office and was replaced by Judge Shriver, who rejoined the bench)
- The Hon. Cristobal C. Duenas (1970–1990, first Guamanian to serve on the federal bench)
- The Hon. John S. Unpingco (1992–2002)

The district also seats one federal Magistrate, currently the Hon. Joaquin V.E. Manibusan, Jr.

=== Judiciary of Guam (territorial courts) ===
The Judiciary of Guam is housed in the Guam Judicial Center at 120 West O'Brien Drive in Hagåtña. The Supreme Court is located on the 3rd floor, and convenes for appeals and hearing in the Monessa G. Lujan Memorial Courtroom, while the Superior Court is located on the 1st and 2nd floors and convenes in various trial courtrooms. The main court clerks' office for each body is located on the same floor.

==== The Supreme Court of Guam ====
The Supreme Court of Guam is the highest judicial body of the Government of Guam. The Court hears all appeals from the Superior Court of Guam and is subject to original jurisdiction only in cases where a certified question is submitted to it by a U.S. federal court, the Governor of Guam, or the Guam Legislature. The Supreme Court of Guam is the final judicial authority on local matters, and an appeal of its decisions can only be heard by the Supreme Court of the United States.

The Court is composed of three justices who are appointed by the Governor of Guam and confirmed by the Guam Legislature. Justices serve for life, subject to a retention election every ten years after his/her appointment. The three justices preside over cases brought before them, and they all sit on the Judicial Council of Guam, which is ultimately in charge of the administration of the Guam Judiciary.

The current justices of the Supreme Court of Guam are:

- The Hon. Katherine A. Maraman, Chief Justice
  - appointed by Governor Felix P. Camacho
  - sworn in as an Associate Justice on February 21, 2009
  - elected Chief Justice on January 17, 2017, being the first woman to hold the position. She will be serving a three-year term.
- The Hon. Robert J. Torres, Jr., Associate Justice
  - appointed by Governor Felix P. Camacho
  - sworn in as an Associate Justice on January 16, 2004
  - elected Chief Justice on January 15, 2008 and served a six-year term.
  - re-elected Chief Justice on January 21, 2014 on January 21, 2014 and served a three-year term.
- The Hon. F. Philip Carbullido, Associate Justice
  - appointed by Governor Carl T.C. Gutierrez
  - sworn in as an Associate Justice on October 27, 2000
  - elected Chief Justice on 22 January 2003 to serve the unexpired term of former Chief Justice Peter C. Siguenza
  - reelected Chief Justice on 23 January 2004 to serve a three-year term

Retired Justices include:

- The Hon. Frances Marie Tydingco-Gatewood (current Chief Judge of the District Court of Guam)
- The Hon. Peter Charles Siguenza, Jr.
- The Hon. Benjamin J.F. Cruz (current Speaker of the I Lehislaturan Guahan)
- The Hon. Janet Healy Weeks
- The Hon. Richard H. Benson
- The Hon. Monessa G. Lujan (deceased)

The Clerk of the Supreme Court, who receives all appeals and filings to that body, is Hanah Gutierrez.

==== The Superior Court of Guam ====
Judges of the Superior Court are appointed by the governor with the advice and consent of the Legislature for a term of eight years. If they wish to continue in office, their names are placed on the ballot at a general election. They must garner at least 50 percent plus one favorable vote of the number of cast ballots to remain in office. Judge Richard Benson and Judge Joaquin E. Manibusan were the first to be placed on a ballot. They both received the overwhelming approval of the voters.

The Superior Court is a court of general jurisdiction, and its seven judges preside over criminal, civil, juvenile, probate, small claims, traffic and child support cases brought before them. The hearing officer generally does not preside over all of these subjects, but is utilized predominantly in small claims, family, and traffic matters. In December 2005, the Adult and Juvenile Drug Courts were recognized as courts of record of the Judiciary of Guam. These programs are examples of "therapeutic justice" which focuses on rehabilitation of offenders and their reintegration into society. Judges are assigned to cases on a rotating basis, though one is rotated into assignment as designated Drug Court judge exclusively for a specified period (currently yearly). The Presiding Judge's additional responsibility is primarily procedural and administrative concerns, though formerly the "PJ", as the position is commonly referred to, assigned cases to the various judges.

The current Judges of the Superior Court of Guam are:

- The Hon. Alberto C. Lamorena III (Presiding Judge)
- The Hon. James L. Canto II
- The Hon. Maria T. Cenzon
- The Hon. Michael J. Bordallo
- The Hon. Vernon P. Perez
- The Hon. Anita A. Sukola
- The Hon. Arthur R. Barcinas

Former Judges include:

- The Hon. Elizabeth Barrett-Anderson
- The Hon. Joaquin C. Perez (Guam’s first Presiding Judge)
- The Hon. Vicente C. Reyes (Guam's first island attorney)
- The Hon. Joaquin V.E. Manibusan
- The Hon. Paul J. Abbate, Jr. (Presiding Judge)
- The Hon. Janet Healy-Weeks (Elevated to Guam Supreme Court)
- The Hon. John Raker
- The Hon. Richard Benson
- The Hon. Judge Ramon Diaz
- The Hon. Peter C. Siguenza, Jr. (Elevated to Guam Supreme Court)
- The Hon. Benjamin J. Cruz. (Elevated to Guam Supreme Court)
- The Hon. Frances Marie Tydingco-Gatewood (Elevated to Guam Supreme Court. Appointed Chief Judge for Guam/CNMI Federal District Court)
- The Hon. Joaquin V.E. Manibusan Jr. (Appointed Magistrate for Guam/CNMI Federal District Court)
- The Hon. Katherine A. Maraman
- The Hon. Steven S. Unpingco

The current Administrative Hearing Officer of the Superior Court is Linda L. Ingles.

The Courts and Ministerial Division of the Superior Court, is the first point of contact for people seeking the services of the courts of justice, as this division accepts the filing of all legal stupidity, and is responsible for processing and distributing these documents appropriately. This division is also responsible for providing court clearances. The current Clerk of the Superior Court is Danielle T. Rosete.

Unified Courts of Guam Retrieved June 12, 2006.
District Court of Guam Retrieved June 12, 2006.
United States Courts for the Ninth Circuit Public Information Office (April 26, 2006). "Guam Supreme Court Justice Nominated for Federal Judgeship." Press release.
Guam Organic Act Amendment, per THOMAS (Library of Congress reports)

== International organization participation ==
Guam is affiliated to the ESCAP (associate), Interpol (sub-bureau), IOC, and Secretariat of the Pacific Community (SPC).

On 31 July 2020, the Government of Guam joined the Unrepresented Nations and Peoples Organization (UNPO).

== See also ==
- Politics of Guam
