= Naval Air Station Agana =

Former United States Naval air station in Guam

- Brewer Field
- Barrigada and Tamuning, Guam
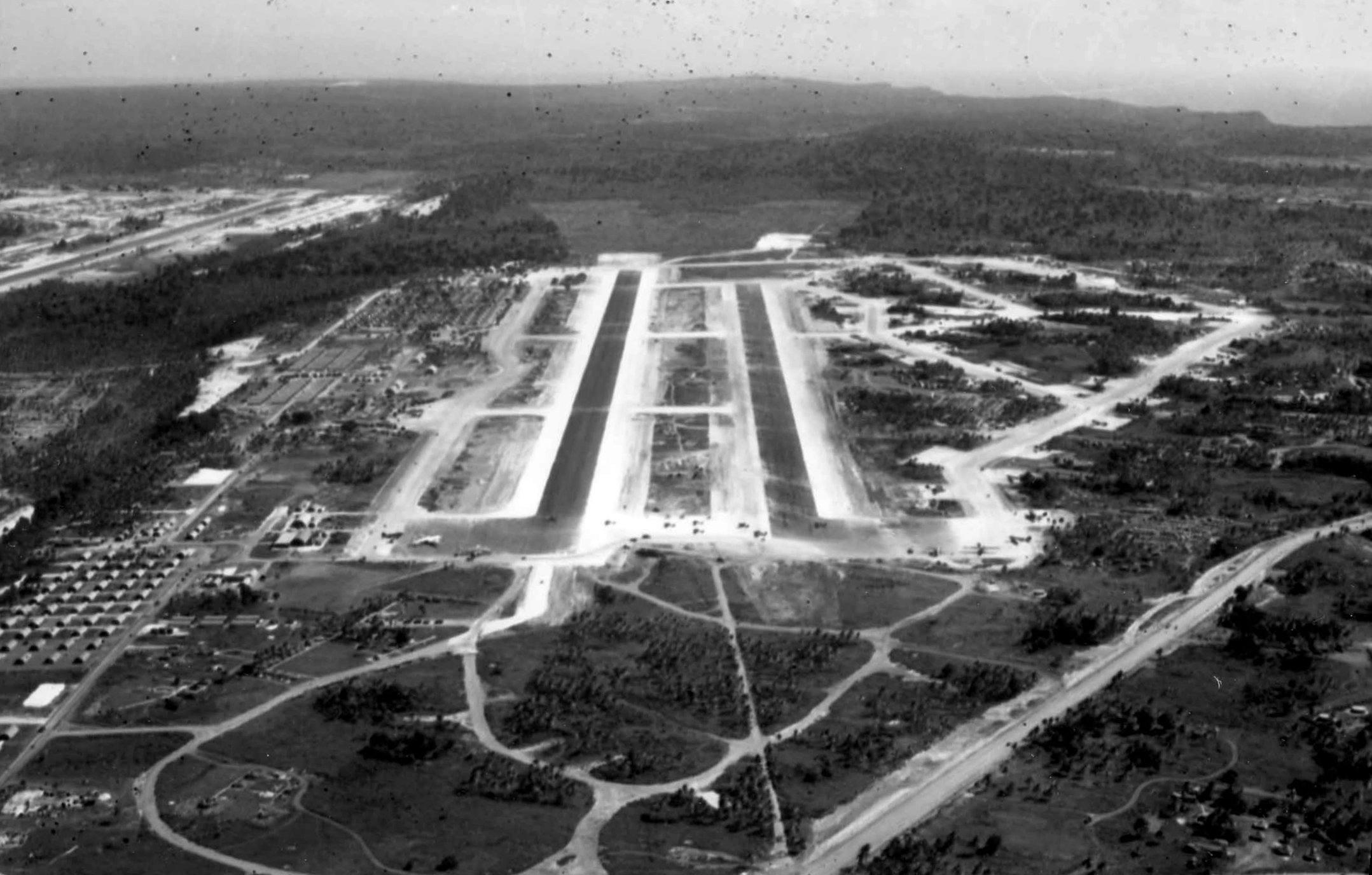
- NAS Agana in January 1945

Site information
- Owner: United States Navy

Location
- Coordinates: 13°29′02″N 144°47′50″E

Site history
- Built: c. 1943
- In use: 1943–1995
- Fate: In civilian operation as Antonio B. Won Pat International Airport

Airfield information
- Identifiers: IATA: GUM, ICAO: PGUM, FAA LID: GUM
- Elevation: 297 feet (91 m) AMSL
Runways
Direction	Length and surface
6L/24R	10,015 feet (3,053 m) Asphalt/concrete
6R/24L	10,014 feet (3,052 m) Asphalt/concrete

Naval Air Station Agana (IATA: GUM, ICAO: PGUM, FAA LID: GUM) is a former United States Naval air station located on the island of Guam. It was opened by the Japanese Navy in 1943 and closed by the United States government in 1995. During and after its closure, it was operated alongside Antonio B. Won Pat International Airport.

== History ==
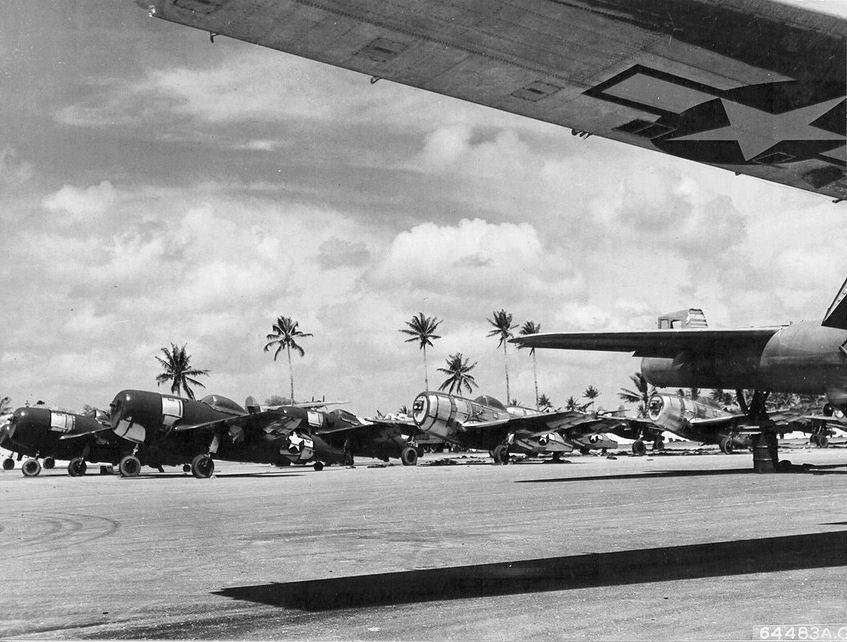
Newly arrived P-47 Thunderbolts lined up in a maintenance area at Agana Airfield on March 28, 1945

The airport was built by the Japanese Navy in about 1943, calling the military airfield Guamu Dai Ni (Guam No. 2) as part of their defense of the Marianas. After the island was recaptured by American forces in 1944, it was renamed Agana Airfield, due to the proximity of the town.

After being repaired in October 1944, the United States Army Air Forces Seventh Air Force used the airfield as a base for the 11th Bombardment Group, which flew B-24 Liberator bombers from the station until being moved to Okinawa in July 1945. With the reassignment of the heavy bombers, the 41st Photographic Reconnaissance Squadron flew long range reconnaissance aircraft (F-5 versions of the P-38 Lightning) from the field until January 1946.

After the war, the USAAF used the airfield for fighter defense of the Marianas (21st Fighter Group, 549th Night Fighter Squadron) until early 1947 and as a transport hub (9th Troop Carrier Squadron). In 1947, the USAAF turned over the airfield to the United States Navy, which consolidated its facilities with those at the closing Harmon Air Force Base in 1949, and operated Naval Air Station Agana until it was closed by the 1993 Base Realignment and Closure (BRAC) Commission.

In 1973, the NAS Agana's airfield was renamed Brewer Field in honor of U.S. Navy Commander Charles W. Brewer, who was shot down over Orote Field, Guam, in June 1944.

In 1992, Angel Santos and other Chamorro Nation members staged a protest outside the base. The protest was staged in response to the frequent low-altitude US military training flights that disturbed Chamorros living near the air station. At the protest, Santos read a statement criticizing the US military and their operations. The protest escalated when Santos and others jumped the fence surrounding the naval air station, in front of gathered local media and members of the US military. Santos spat in the face of the US military policeman who arrested him.

== See also ==
- USAAF in the Central Pacific
