= Chamorro Nation =

Political movement seeking sovereignty for the island of Guam

The Chamorro Nation (Chamorro: Nasion Chamoru) is a political movement seeking sovereignty for the island of Guam, founded by Angel Leon Guerrero Santos. The Chamorro Nation was formed on July 21, 1991, comprising numerous grassroots organizations which advocated for the protection of Chamorro land, culture, and political rights. As a political movement, the Chamorro Nation is recognized as a key turning point in changing Chamorro attitudes toward the United States and increasing the desire for Chamorro rights, particularly the return of lands seized from Chamorros by the US federal government.

== Origins ==
On July 21, 1991, a group of approximately twenty people gathered at Latte Stone Park in the village of Hagåtña. Santos called the members to join him in the middle of the eight large latte stones in the park. “Stay within the latte, this is where the power of our ancestors, the spirit of our ancestors lives and it is important that we share this with them,” Santos said.

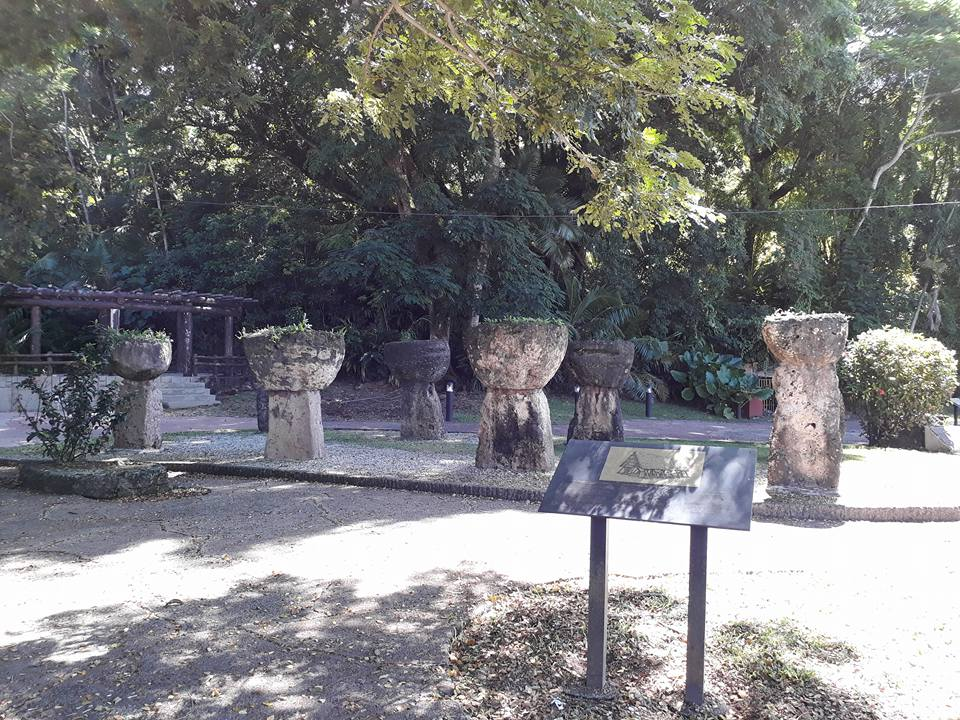
The park where Santos and the Chamorro Chelus for Independence Association gathered and read the Proclamation for Independence is referred to as the Senator Angel Leon Guerrero Santos Latte Stone Memorial Park.

=== Proclamation for independence ===
The group was composed of Chamorros from various grassroots organizations. At the gathering, Santos, who was then the president of the Chamorro Chelus for Independence Association, read a proclamation declaring the existence of a Chamorro nation:

“It is our inalienable right to exist as a people whose ancestors were brought into this nation to live on this land and survive off its resources. With the mass influx of immigrants into our island, the destruction of our environment, and the raping of our ocean resources, it is imperative that we claim the rights and responsibility to protect and preserve our land and resources.”

Group members signed the proclamation declaring Guam's independence, and non-Chamorro supporters signed a separate document that identified them as witnesses. During the first gathering, Santos noted that the possibility for securing political independence was open through a United Nations Charter. Santos also stated that Chamorros have not been acknowledged to exist as a nation of people for over 400 years, since Guam's initial colonization.

== Chamorro activism in the 1980s and 1990s ==
=== Organization of People for Indigenous Rights ===
In 1981, the Organization of People for Indigenous Rights (OPI-R), a Chamorro nationalist organization dedicated to achieving self-determination, was formed. OPI-R utilized the United Nations as a tool for achieving political self-determination, and in 1982 the group conducted community fundraising efforts and successfully sent three representatives to New York City to testify in front of the Special Political and Decolonization Committee (Fourth Committee) of the United Nations on Guam's behalf. This marked the first time that Chamorros testified in front of the UN and brought the struggle for Chamorro rights to the international stage. OPI-R is recognized for framing Chamorro self-determination as an "inalienable right".

=== Chamorro veterans and political activism ===
OPI-R's membership was made up of Chamorros who were educated or came from prominent, established Chamorro families. In contrast, most members of the Chamorro Nation came from low-income backgrounds. Membership in the Chamorro Nation also differed from OPI-R due to the number of Chamorro veterans who joined the Chamorro Nation after experiencing racism while serving in the US military. Furthermore, some members were critical of the US military after being drafted by the US, which had taken ancestral Chamorro lands after World War II, and did not allow Chamorros to participate in US presidential elections.

== Chamorro Nation political activities ==
=== The Chamorro Land Trust ===
In response to Guam's unique history of land loss and militarization, the Chamorro Land Trust Act was passed in 1974, with a mandate to "advance the social, cultural and economic development and well-being of the Chamorro people by way of residential, agricultural and commercial land distribution and economic assistance programs". The Chamorro Land Trust Act was modeled after the Hawaiian Homes Commission Act of 1921. However, the Chamorro Land Trust Act was not implemented until Santos, with the support of the Chamorro Nation, challenged the issue in court in 1992. The Chamorro Nation pressured Guam governor Joseph F. Ada to implement the act, and staged two camp outs which lasted for over a month, on the front lawn of the governor's complex. As a result, Governor Ada appointed commissioners to the newly formed Chamorro Land Trust Commission, which was the implementation of the Chamorro Land Trust Act.

Members of the Chamorro Nation were often accused by other Guam residents of being exclusionary and divisive. Santos stated in response: "We're not racist. We're nationalists and there is a big difference. We are not anti-Filipino or anti-Korean or anti-American. We're pro-Chamorus, and there is a big difference".

=== Naval air station protest ===
In 1992, Santos and other Chamorro Nation members staged a protest outside of Naval Air Station Agana. The protest was staged in response to the danger of frequent low-altitude US military training flights that disturbed Chamorros living near the Naval Air Station. At the protest, Santos read a statement criticizing the US military and their operations. The protest escalated when Santos and others jumped the fence surrounding the Naval Air Station, in front of gathered local media and members of the US military. When Santos was apprehended by US military guards, he spit in the face of his captor.

== Legacy and influence ==
The Chamorro Nation is credited with changing the public debate regarding Guam's quest for sovereignty and political independence. As result of the Chamorro Nation's political work and public protests, politicians on Guam are now expected to have an opinion on Guam's political future, and discussions around decolonization are now considered mainstream.
