= Latte Stone Park =

Urban park in Hagatna, Guam

Senator Angel Leon Guerrero Santos Latte Stone Memorial Park
- Latte Stone Park
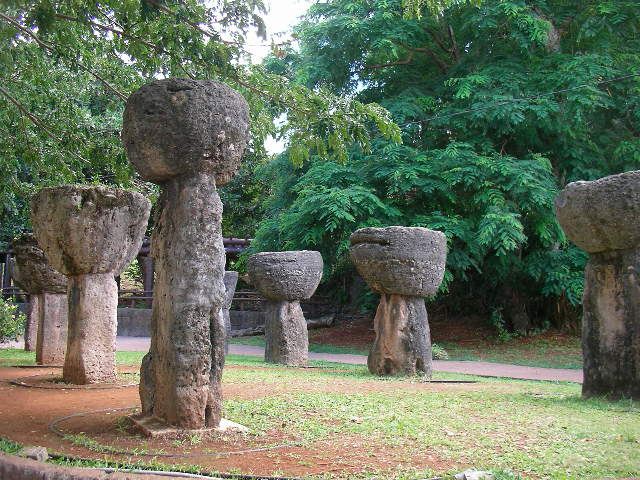
- The Mepo' latte stone set in the park, 2006

- Location within Guam
- Type: Urban park
- Location: Hagåtña, Guam
- Coordinates: 13.4722°N 144.7513°E
- Operator: Guam Department of Parks and Recreation
- Open
- Agana/Hagatna Cliffline Fortifications
- U.S. National Register of Historic Places
- Location: Address restricted
- MPS: Japanese Coastal Defense Fortifications on Guam TR
- NRHP reference No.: 88001877
- Added to NRHP: March 4, 1991
- Status: Open all year

Latte Stone Park, officially Senator Angel Leon Guerrero Santos Latte Stone Memorial Park, is an urban park in Hagåtña, Guam. Established in the 1950s and operated by the Guam Department of Parks and Recreation, it is best known for its set of eight historical latte stones, which were transferred from their original site in Fena. The Park is located along the cliffline below the Governor's residence in Agana Heights and south of the Plaza de España. It is often visited by sightseers visiting central Hagåtña. The park also includes the entrances to two sets of caves that were constructed during the Japanese occupation (1941–1944) by forced laborers and that were listed in the National Register of Historic Places in 1991 as the Agana/Hagåtña Cliffline Fortifications.

== History ==
The latte are originally from the village of Mepo' (also Mepo and Mepu') located in southcentral Guam's Fena area. Mepo' was located in the historically densely settled Talofofo River watershed but the population is thought to have been transferred in the Reducción villagization of the Spanish-Chamorro Wars in the late seventeenth century. Record of the Mepo' latte were first published in 1932 by archaeologist Laura Maud Thompson, where she noted that the Mepo' latte included the only upright latte with cap in place, as well as the only latte with a square pillar, identified on the island. In the aftermath of the 1944 Battle of Guam, the U.S. military constructed a large munitions depot in the Fena valley. An archeologist in 1947 described the situation:

It is fortunate that Laura Thompson has described the Fena and the Mepo latte. They exist, as groups, no longer. The Fena stones may be found in thick grass to the cliff side of a skeet range to which they were apparently sacrificed. At Mepo the supports and caps (two sets) were moved from their original positions to provide space for the construction of Naval Ammunition Depot Magazine 173. The stones were handled with care and piled in three groups. They are readily available for restoration and this, indeed, was planned by Military Government of Guam. One latte complete may be moved to the plaza of Agaña. Setting up the supports and either replacing the caps or placing them near the pillars will undoubtedly save the stones from vandalism or use as construction material. It should be mentioned that at Mepo was one of the two complete ― that is, support with capital ― single latte on Guam.

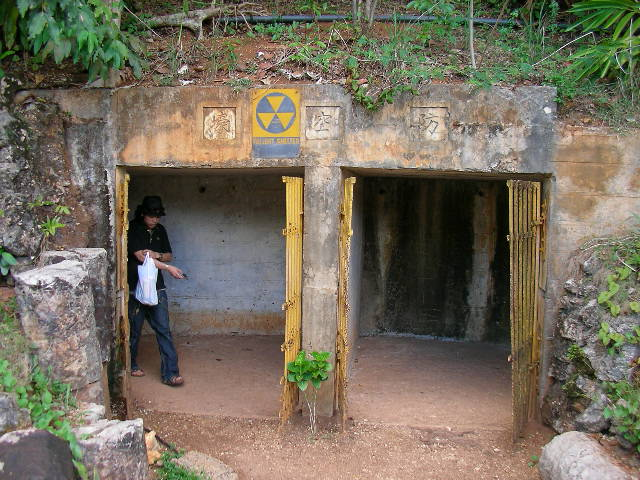
The cave entrance at the base of the park cliffline has "air raid shelter" inscribed in Japanese above it (防空壕), as well as an English sign for a fallout shelter.

Latte Stone Park was established during the administration of Governor Ford Quint Elvidge (1953–1956). On November 24, 1953, Elvidge, the second Federally-appointed Governor of Guam, established the Parks, Monuments, and Museum Committee to re-establish the Guam Museum. The Governor also tasked the committee with the preservation of Spanish colonial structures and researching the island's history, folklore, and geology. The Mepo' set was moved to Hagåtña for display, and then to the current location of the park in 1955. The latte set was considered for nomination to the National Register of Historic Places in 2013.

A cave entrance located directly behind the displayed latte stones is part of a series of caves along the base of the cliff line constructed with forced labor during the Japanese occupation of Guam from 1941 to 1944. The caves were used to store supplies and also as bomb shelters. It is registered under both the Guam and National Register of Historic Places.

On July 21, 1991, about 20 Chamoru activists gathered in the middle of the latte set to hear a declaration made by their leader Angel Santos on the right of the Chamoru to exist as a nation. Santos urged the group, "Stay within the latte, this is where the power of our ancestors, the spirit of our ancestors lives and it is important that we share this with them." This group, the United Chamoru Chelus for Independence, would become part of the activist coalition Chamorro Nation (Nasion Chamoru). Chamorro Nation conceived of Guam as a U.S. colony and included many U.S. veterans of the Vietnam War who were disillusioned that Guam's political status prohibited it from full participation in American democracy. Latte Stone Park became a favorite location for Chamorro Nation members to gather. Santos himself was a 13-year veteran of the United States Air Force. He was elected to his third term in the Legislature of Guam in 2000 after serving a six-month term in Federal prison for violating a 1993 court order to keep off Federal land at Andersen Air Force Base. However, he was unable to finish his term in office due to poor health, dying in 2003. In 2004, the Guam Legislature passed a bill to erect a memorial to Santos in the park, noting it was "where he often prayed, believing the site to be significant in the history of the Chamorro people," and further renaming it in his memory, as well as permanently banning vendors from the park. The park is a regular location for Chamorro Nation meetings and memorials to Senator Santos.

The park is included as one of seventeen sites in the Hagåtña Heritage Walking Trail, which was opened in 2010. The Trail runs nearly two miles from Fort Santa Agueda down the hill into Hagåtña and to the coastline.
