= DMH =

DMH may refer to

- Deenanath Mangeshkar Hospital, Pune
- Department of Mental Health (disambiguation)
- Dimethylhydantoin
- Dimethylhydrazine
- Dimenhydrinate
- Marine Histories Doctorate (this a degree in underwater archaeology and is also shown as a Doctor of Marine Histories or DMH)
- Dorsomedial hypothalamic nucleus
- Differential methylation hybridization (method used for DNA methylation profiling)
