= Guam Public Library System =

Library system

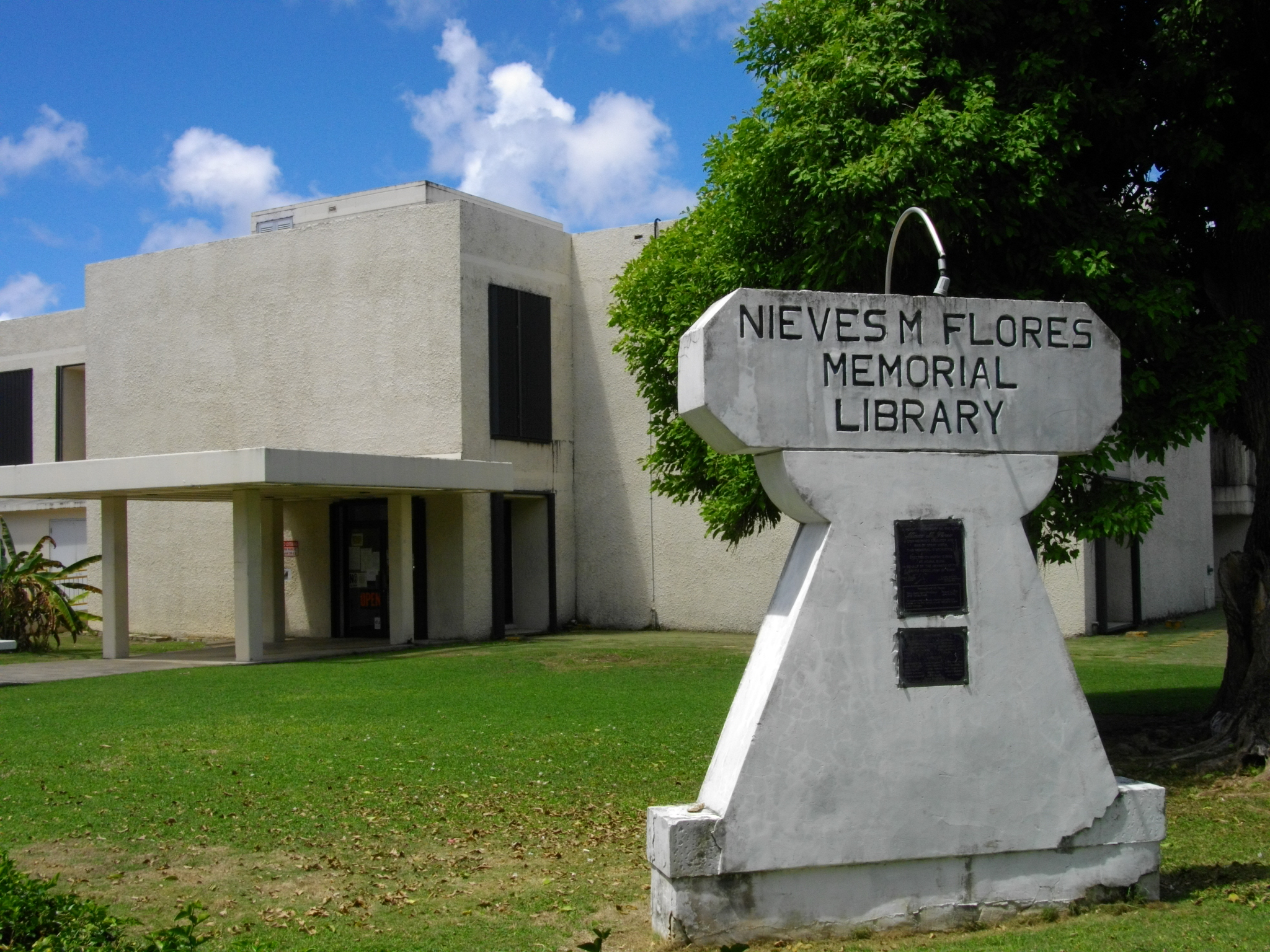
- Nieves M. Flores Memorial Library
- 13.475727°N 144.753580°E
- Location: Guam
- Established: 1949
- Branches: 5

Collection
- Size: 258,241 (2016)

Access and use
- Circulation: 41,389 (2016)
- Population served: 159,358 (2016)

Other information
- Budget: $1,065,802 (2016)
- Website: gpls.guam.gov

Guam Public Library System (Chamoru: Sisteman Laibirihan Pupbleko Guåhan) is the public library system of the United States territory of Guam. The main library is the Nieves M. Flores Memorial Library at 254 Martyr Street in the village of Hagåtña.

== History ==
The Guam Public Library System officially opened January 31, 1949 sourced from two Quonset huts near the Agana Azotea. A division of the Department of Education, the original collection contained 13,000 books which were sourced mainly from deactivated Navy libraries. Many of the books also came from a substantial donation from the Los Angeles Public Library.

By 1953 a bookmobile service began, allowing those in remote reaches of the island territory of the United States to have access to new books. The following year the library became an independent government agency, separating itself from the Department of Education.

In 1960 the library relocated to the first floor of what used to be the Guam Administration Building. Because of its continued growth, and the need for more room, the library expanded to the second floor in 1968, and to the third floor in 1979. At this point the building was entirely used by the library and therefore was renamed the N. M. Flores Memorial Public Library.

In 2011 the library system became a division of the Department of Chamorro Affairs.

== Branches ==
The Guam Public Library system consists of 5 library branches located in various villages throughout the island. The following locations each have their own library branch.

- Agat - 165 Follard Street
- Barrigada - 177 San Roque Drive
- Dededo - 283 West Santa Barbara Avenue
- Merizo - 376 Cruz Avenue
- Yona - 265 Sister Mary Eucharita Drive

The Agat and Dededo libraries were completed in 1968, the Barrigada Library was completed in 1970, the Merizo Library was completed in 1974, and the Yona Library opened in 1993. As well as having five branches and one main library, the system also reintroduced a bookmobile in 1990.

Library locations

== See also ==
- State Library of the Commonwealth of the Northern Mariana Islands
- List of libraries in the United States
