= Reyn Johnson =

Guamanian footballer

Personal information
- Full name: Reyn Johnson
- Date of birth: November 1, 1990 (age 35)
- Place of birth: Tamuning, Guam
- Position: Midfielder

College career
Years	Team	Apps	(Gls)
2009–2012	UMass Boston Beacons	65	(13)

Senior career*
Years	Team	Apps	(Gls)
2008–2009	Guam Shipyard	0	(0)

International career
2008–	Guam	10	(0)
- * Club domestic league appearances and goals

Reyn Johnson (born 1 November 1990) is a Guamanian international footballer. He made his first appearance for the Guam national football team in 2008.
