= St. Anthony's Church, Tamuning =

St. Anthony's Church
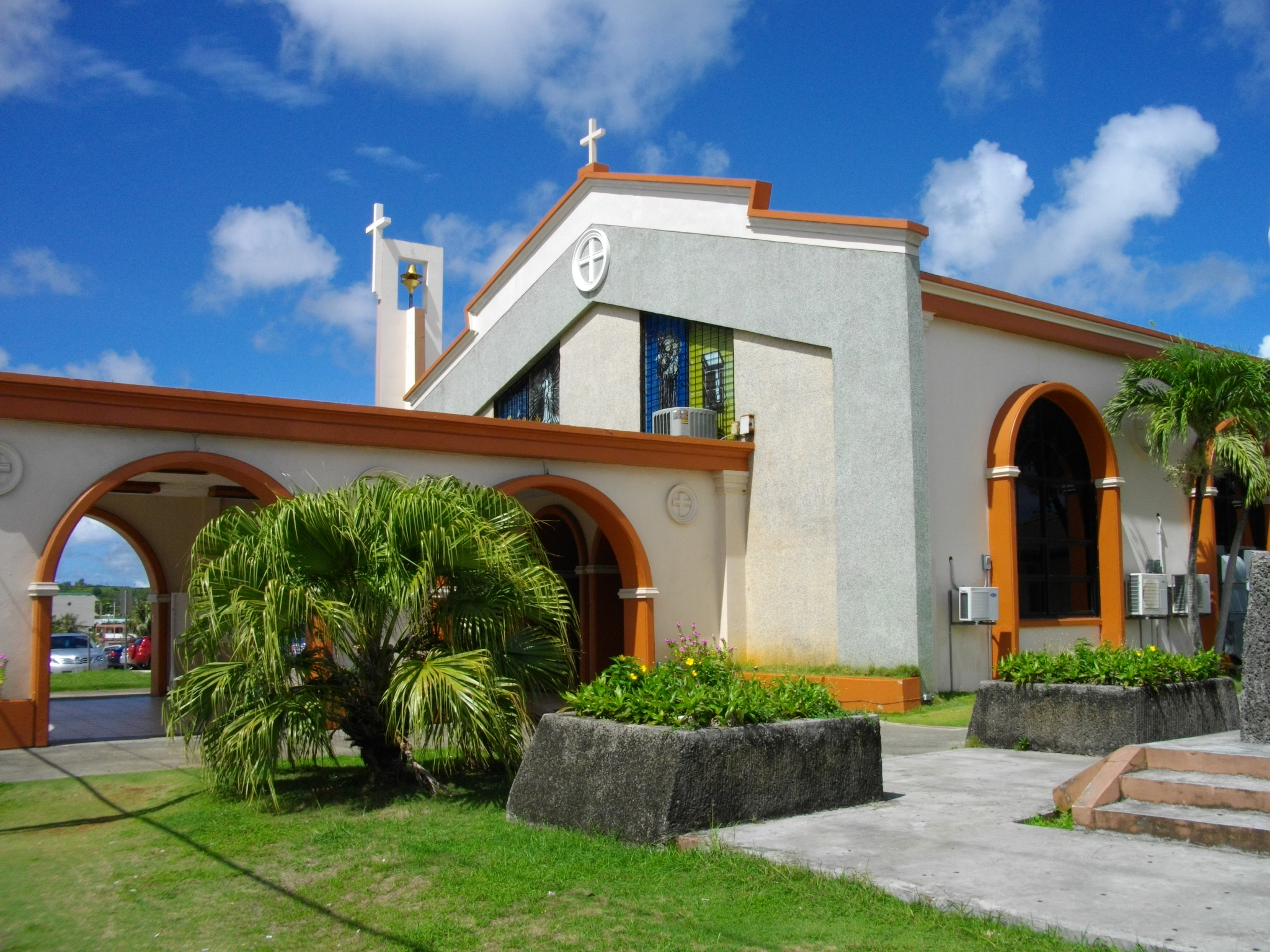
- St. Anthony's Church
- 13°29′55″N 144°46′52″E
- Location: Tamuning, Guam
- Country: United States
- Denomination: Roman Catholic Church

St. Anthony's Church also known more formally as Church of Saint Anthony and Saint Victor, is a Catholic church in the town of Tamuning in Guam, an unincorporated territory of the United States in the western Pacific Ocean. The church was founded in 1946 and belongs to Latin Rite Archdiocese of Agana (Archidioecesis Aganiensis), presided over by the Archbishop of Agana.

== Background ==
The church serves the community of Tamuning which developed following World War II. After its initial construction in 1946, the church was name St. Victor's, but was later renamed St. Anthony's. Both St. Anthony of Padua and St. Victor remain as patron saints of the village and the church. The feast day of St. Anthony is celebrated on 13 June, and St. Victor is celebrated on 28 July.

The church belongs to the Latin Rite Archdiocese of Agana (Archidioecesis Aganiensis), which was raised to its current status by Pope John Paul II by the Papal bull Compertum quidem., published in 1984. The diocese is under the jurisdiction of Archbishop of Agana, a position currently held by Ryan Pagente Jimenez. The church is served by Father. Joel De Los Reyes, and Pastor Pale' Mike Cristostomo. All religious services are held in English.

Pope John Paul II made a papal visit to Guam in February 1981, where he celebrated an outdoor mass, attended by 25,000 people.

On 13 June 2024, the church celebrated a service to commemorate 65 years of the existence of the diocese.

The church is also connected to a school in the village, St. Anthony Catholic School, Tamuning GU. The school has its own priests, as well as those from the church.

== See also ==
- Roman Catholicism in Guam
- St. Anthony's Church (disambiguation)
