= Mangilao, Guam =

Coordinates: 13°26′56″N 144°48′01″E

Mangilao
- Village
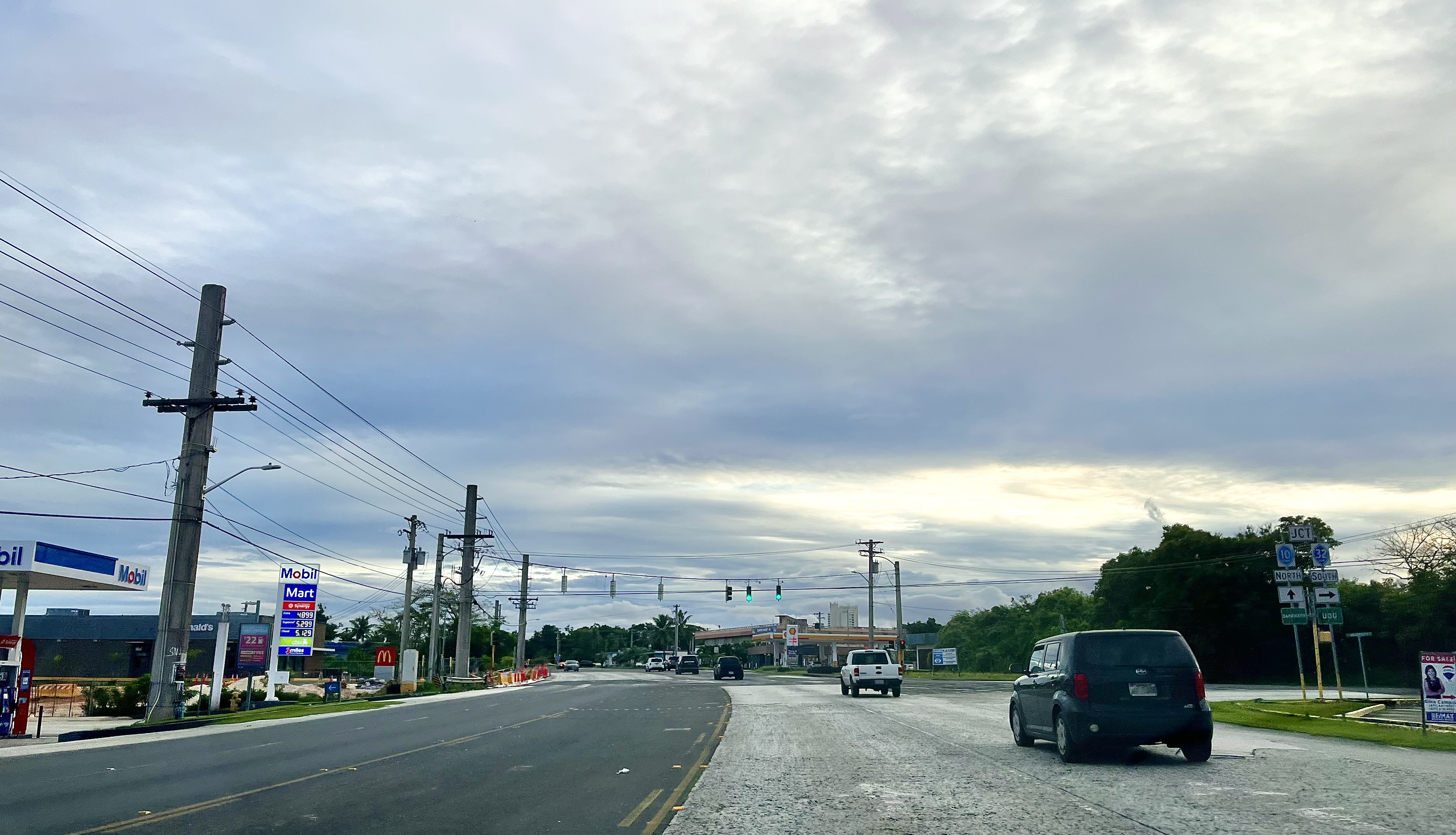

- Location of Mangilao within the Territory of Guam.
- Country: United States
- Territory: Guam

Government
  - Mayor: Allan R.G. Ungacta (R)
  - Vice Mayor: Edward Tosco (R)

Population (2020)
  - Total: 13,476
- Time zone: UTC+10 (ChST)

Historical population
| Census | Pop. | Note | %± |
|---|---|---|---|
| 1960 | 1,965 | | — |
| 1970 | 3,228 | | 64.3% |
| 1980 | 6,840 | | 111.9% |
| 1990 | 10,483 | | 53.3% |
| 2000 | 13,313 | | 27.0% |
| 2010 | 15,191 | | 14.1% |
| 2020 | 13,476 | | −11.3% |

Mangilao is a village on the eastern shore of the United States territory of Guam. The village's population has decreased slightly since the island's 2010 census.

Cliffs lie along much of the village's shoreline provide dramatic views, including of Pago Bay along Mangilao's southern coastline, but few of Mangilao's beaches are available for recreational uses. The island's main prison is in Mangilao.

== Demographics ==
The U.S. Census Bureau has the municipality in multiple census-designated places: Mangilao, Adacao, Pagat, and University of Guam.

== Government and infrastructure ==
The Guam Department of Corrections (DEPCOR) operates the Adult Correctional Facility (ACF), the Community Corrections Center (C3), and the Women's Facility in Mangilao.

The Guam Department of Youth Affairs has its headquarters in Mangilao. The Guam Youth Correctional Facility, operated by the department, is in Mangilao.

The Guam Department of Agriculture has its headquarters in Mangilao.

The Guam Department of Public Health and Social Services has its headquarters in Mangilao.

== Geography ==
The Federal government of the United States owns portions of the land in Mangilao; the Government of Guam stated that it was one of several villages that are "characterized primarily by the large proportion of land owned by the federal government".

== Education ==
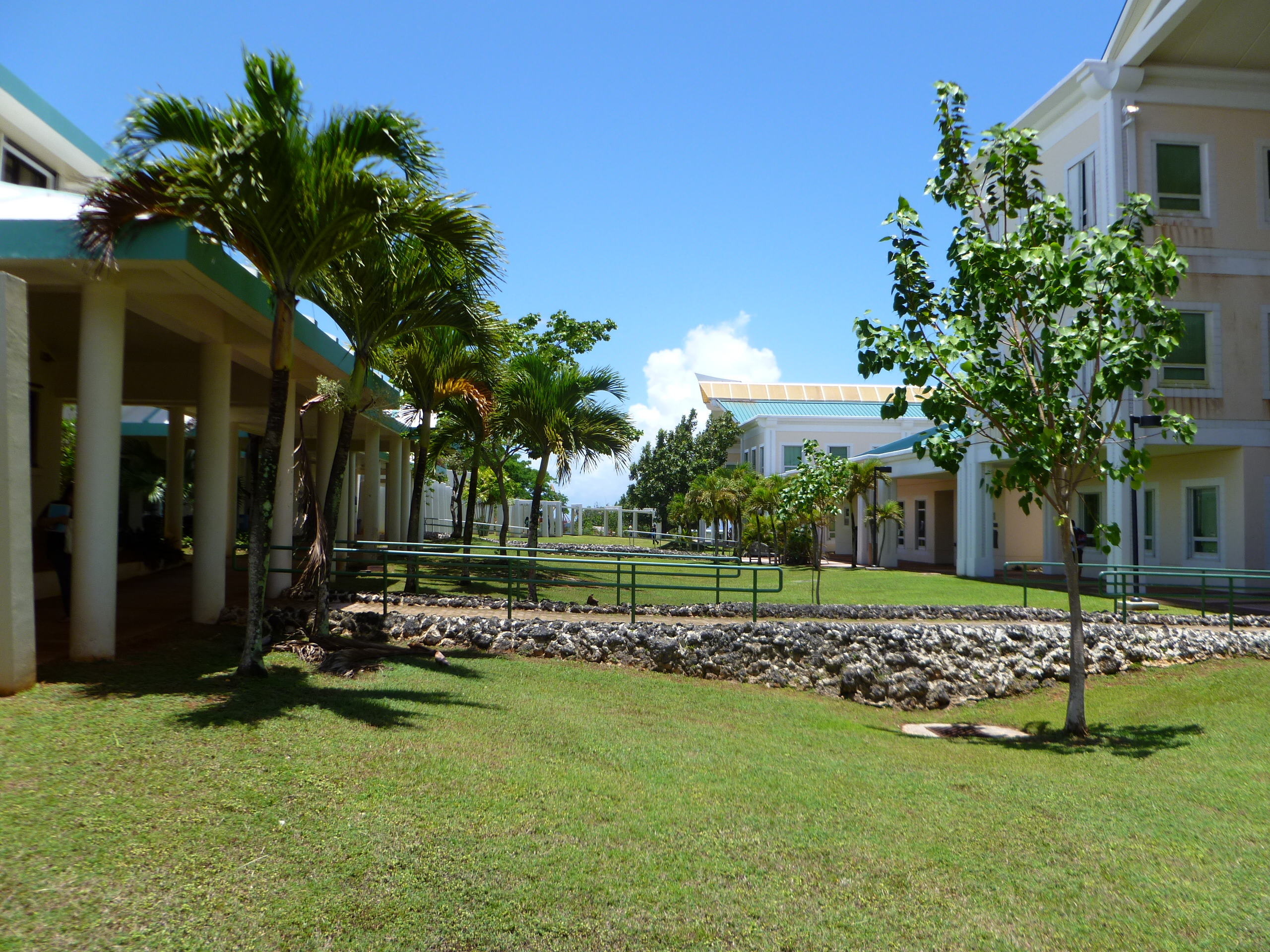
University of Guam

Due to the presence of tertiary institutions, the Government of Guam described Mangilao as Guam's "education district". The University of Guam, Guam Community College, and Pacific Islands University are in the village.

The Guam Public School System serves the island. Some Mangilao residents are zoned to Captain Henry B. Price Elementary School, which is located in Mangilao. Other residents are zoned to Pedro C. Lujan Elementary School in Barrigada. Some Mangilao residents are zoned to Agueda I. Johnston Middle School in Chalan-Pago-Ordot, while others are zoned to Luis P. Untalan Middle School in Barrigada. All of Mangilao is zoned to George Washington High School, which is in Mangilao.

In regards to the Department of Defense Education Activity (DoDEA), Mangilao is in the school transportation zone for Andersen Elementary and Andersen Middle School, while Guam High School is the island's sole DoDEA high school.

A Roman Catholic high school, Father Dueñas Memorial School, is in Mangilao. In addition, the Japanese School of Guam, which has day school and weekend supplementary school components, is in Mangilao.

The An-Noor Mosque is also located here.

== Government ==
Commissioner of Mangilao
| Name | Term begin | Term end |
| Francisco P. Pangelinan | 1933 | 1944 |
| Manuel T. Sablan | 1950 | 1952 |
| Jesus T. Pereira | 1952 | 1969 |
| Jesus D.L.R. Santos | 1969 | January 1, 1973 |

Mayor of Mangilao
| Name | Party | Term begin | Term end |
| Nicolas D. Francisco | Democratic | January 1, 1973 | January 5, 1987 |
| Nonito C. Blas | Republican | January 5, 1987 | January 2, 2017 |
| Allan R.G. Ungacta | Republican | January 2, 2017 | present |

Vice Mayor of Mangilao
| Name | Party | Term begins | Term end |
| Allan R.G. Ungacta | Republican | January 5, 2009 | January 2, 2017 |
| Thomas J.F. Duenas | Republican | January 2, 2017 | January 4, 2021 |
| Kevin A.N. Delgado | Democratic | January 4, 2021 | January 4, 2025 |
| Edward Tosco | Republican | January 6, 2025 | present |

== Populated places ==
- Adacao - census designated place
- Asbeco - populated place
- Latte Heights - census designated place

== See also ==
- Villages of Guam
