= Guam Department of Land Management =

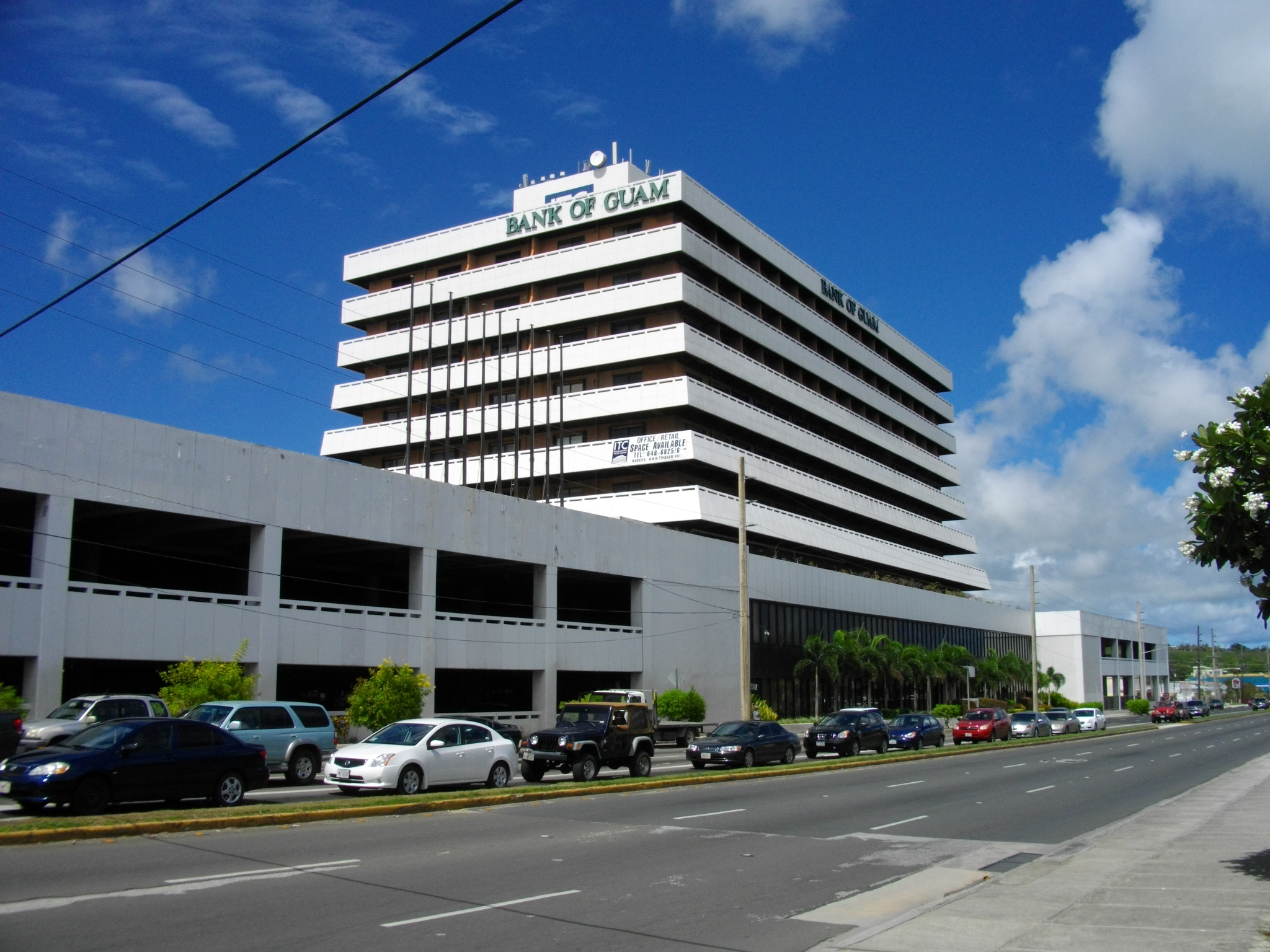
The Guam International Trade Center (ITC) building houses the department's headquarters

The Guam Department of Land Management (DLM, Chamorro: Dipåttamenton Minanehan Tåno’) is a department of the government on the United States territory of Guam. The department has its headquarters in the Guam International Trade Center (ITC) Building in Tamuning.

== See also ==
- Government of Guam
