= Guam Department of Agriculture =

The Guam Department of Agriculture is a government agency in the United States territory of Guam. Its headquarters are in the village Mangilao.

== See also ==
- Government of Guam
