= Guam Department of Youth Affairs =

Guam Department of Youth Affairs Depåttamenton Asunton Manhoben
- Abbreviation: DYA

Agency overview
- Formed: March 1978
- Employees: 68

Jurisdictional structure
- Operations jurisdiction: United States

Operational structure
- Headquarters: Mangilao, Guam
- Guam Department of Youth Affairs (Guam)
- Agency executives: Melanie W. Brennan, Director; Krisinda C. Aguon, Deputy Director
- Divisions: 2

Facilities
- Facilities: 4

Website
- dya.guam.gov

The Guam Department of Youth Affairs (Chamorro: Depåttamenton Asunton Manhoben) is the youth corrections agency of the United States territory of Guam. The department has its headquarters in the village of Mangilao. The Guam Youth Correctional Facility, operated by the department, is in Mangilao. The agency also operates the Cottage Homes, located in the village Talofofo. The Liheng Famaguon School provides educational services to inmates of the department.

== See also ==
- Government of Guam
