= Guam Department of Corrections =

Guam Department of Corrections Depattamenton Mangngurihi
- Abbreviation: DEPCOR

Agency overview
- Formed: July 18, 1968
- Employees: 213 (2021)
- Annual budget: $5 million (2021)
- Legal personality: Government agency

Jurisdictional structure
- Operations jurisdiction: Guam, US
- Legal jurisdiction: Guam

Operational structure
- Headquarters: Mangilao, Guam
- Guam Department of Corrections (Guam)
- Corrections officers: 180
- Agency executive: Fred Bordallo, Jr., Director

Facilities
- Facilities: 4

Website
- doc.guam.gov

The Guam Department of Corrections (DEPCOR, Chamorro: Depattamenton Mangngurihi) is an agency of the government of the United States territory of Guam that operates the island's correctional facilities.

The facility headquarters and main facility are in Mangilao.

The Guam Adult Correctional Facility (ACF) is the main correctional facility on Guam. The other facilities operated by DEPCOR include the community Corrections Center (C3), the Hagåtña Detention Facility, and the Women's Facility. ACF, the women's facility, and the C3 are in Mangilao, while the Hagåtña Detention Facility is in Hagåtña.

== Line of Duty Deaths ==
According to ODMP, 2 DEPCOR officers have been killed in the line of duty.

== See also ==
- Government of Guam
