= Department of Mental Health =

Department of Mental Health may refer to

- Alabama Department of Mental Health
- Los Angeles County Department of Mental Health
- Massachusetts Department of Mental Health
- Mississippi Department of Mental Health
- Guam Department of Mental Health and Substance Abuse
- Oklahoma Department of Mental Health and Substance Abuse Services
- Virginia Department of Mental Health, Mental Retardation, and Substance Abuse
