= Guam Department of Public Health and Social Services =

The Guam Department of Public Health and Social Services (Chamorro: Dipattamenton Salut Pupbleko Yan Setbision Susiat) is an agency of the government of the United States territory of Guam. The agency includes the Division of General Administration, Division of Public Health, Division of Environmental Health, Division of Public Welfare, and Division of Senior Citizens. The Department of Public Health and Social Services (DPHSS) Central Office and Health Center is located in Mangilao. DPHSS Division of Public Health includes two regional clinics, the Northern Region Community Health Center in Dededo, and the Southern Region Community Health Center in Inalåhan. Regional Health Clinics provide Prenatal and Postpartum care, Women's Health (OB/GYN Care), Well Baby Care, Child Health, Immunization, Adolescent Health, Adult Care, Minor Surgery and Wound Repair, TB Test, Directly Observed TB Therapy.

== See also ==
- Government of Guam
