= Angel Santos =

American politician

Angel L.G. Santos III

Senator in the 23rd, 24th, and 26th Guam Legislature
- In office January 2, 1995 – January 4, 1999
- In office January 1, 2001 – January 6, 2003

Personal details
- Born: Angel Anthony Leon Guerrero Santos III; April 14, 1959 Guam
- Died: July 6, 2003 (aged 44) Guam
- Party: Democratic Party of Guam
- Children: 9
- Profession: Politician, activist

Angel Anthony Leon Guerrero Santos III (April 14, 1959 – July 6, 2003), also known as Angel L.G. Santos, or Anghet, was a Chamorro rights activist and Guamanian politician. Santos served as a Senator in the Guam Legislature from 1995 to 1999 and again from 2001 to 2003, and was a candidate for Governor of Guam in 1998 with his running mate Jose “Pedo” Toves Terjale, a future Mayor of Yona.

== Early life ==
Santos was born 14 April 1959 to Angel Cruz Santos II and Amanda Cruz Leon Guerrero.

== Military career ==
Santos was active in the Junior Reserve Officers’ Training Corps (JROTC) while he was in high school, and enlisted in the US Air Force after he graduated. He was honorably discharged from the Air Force after 13 years, and was stationed in Montana, Texas, Hawaii, Mississippi, California and Guam.

As both an activist and an elected official Santos took seriously the issue of environmental damage caused by the US military presence on the island. He took on this issue not only because of the role it may have played leading to his daughter’s death, but also because of the hazardous dump sites and explosive ordnance that the US military had left around Guam after World War II. One such site was owned by Santos’ uncle in Mongmong. Santos conducted several studies and held hearings, all of which pointed to the detrimental effects on the health of the land and the people after years of militarization on Guam.

== Political career ==
Since the 1970s it was unusual for public leaders to be openly critical of US immigration policy and discuss the minoritization of Chamorros due to the influx of other ethnic groups. Most politicians would not touch this issue if they expected to win elections. Nevertheless, Angel Santos, in spite of his position on US immigration policy, made the transition to public servant when he was elected to the Guam Legislature in 1994.

Santos ran for office in response to a challenge by Judge Unpingco, who had presided over his 1993 case. The judge had told Santos that if he, the defendant, “wishes an opportunity to challenge the title of the United States, the defendant must work with the legislative branch of government for the passage of a statute that would allow him to do so.”

As an activist, Santos had tried to work outside the system, but he made a decision as a senator to try to change things from within the government. Although he was well known as a critic of US policies and the federal government, Santos also regularly criticized the corruption of the local government. For example, he was critical of the Chamorro and non-Chamorro elites who he claimed controlled the island’s media and economy.

While the public perception of many was that Santos was a “racist” who only cared about Chamorro issues, Santos actually campaigned hard on a platform of human rights. He believed protecting Chamorro rights was something that benefited everyone; fighting against inequality in Guam and for low-income families benefited everyone. Many non-Chamorros were attracted to his message of seeking justice for all, not just Chamorros. For example, as a senator he organized protests on behalf of Filipinos who had approached him because of the ways they had been wrongfully targeted by landlords and been evicted.

A high point of his time in the Legislature was when he helped draft the rules and regulations for the Chamorro Land Trust Commission to finally carry out the Chamorro Land Trust Act, passed in 1975.

== Hita Campaign 1998 ==
In 1998 he ran for governor as a Democrat, with Jose “Pedo” Terlaje, the Mayor of Yo’na (Yona), as his running mate. Their campaign was built around the slogan “Hita,” the Chamorro word for “we.” In Chamorro there are two forms of “we” —the inclusive (you are including those you are talking to in your statement) and the exclusive (you are excluding those you are talking to). Hami is the exclusive, hita the inclusive. Hita was chosen because it communicated both that his campaign had a Chamorro core to it, but it was still open to everyone. Santos was not running a “Hami” campaign where only Chamorros and those like him were included. His campaign was primarily a grassroots effort and despite doing very well in proving himself articulate and intelligent during debates, he did not make it past the primary elections.

== Senator again ==
Upon returning from federal prison Santos was once again elected to a seat in the Guam Legislature even though he was not eligible under local law due to the Federal crimes he committed. Because of this, he was much more low-key than in previous years, but he continued to champion Chamorro issues and land issues, and to speak out in favor of Guam’s decolonization.

It was during this period that he began to attend religious services and prayer meetings at the Seventh-day Adventist Church. Santos had gone to the SDA clinic in Tamuning for medical treatment and was intrigued by the doctor who asked to pray with him after discussing his medical condition. Santos wanted to learn more about the SDA faith and found himself attracted to what he perceived as the more holistic religious experience of Seventh-day Adventists who not only emphasize prayer, but also exercise, eating right, not smoking or drinking and doing all things in moderation. Santos believed that this was the type of change that Chamorros needed—to not only have lands returned, but to take care of their language, culture, environment, and even their bodies and health.

== Death ==
In December 2002, then Speaker of the Guam Legislature Antonio Unpingco announced Angel Santos was very ill. Until that announcement, it was only rumored that Santos was sick. On July 6, 2003, Angel Leon Guerrero Santos died at 44 years old. The Pacific Daily News, however, announced that Santos had died of Parkinson’s disease. The official cause was listed as an unknown neurodegenerative disease.

== Angel Santos Latte Stone Park ==
On March 30, 2005, Latte Stone Park in Hagatña was officially renamed Senator Angel Leon Guerrero Santos Latte Memorial Park. The park had been a favorite spot for reflection and mediation by Santos. The large latte that stand in the park are originally from the Fena area, now known as Ordnance Annex—a site filled with the artifacts and remains of ancient Chamorros, but is now off limits to the public. Santos felt a strong connection to those latte and it was at this site that the birth of the group Nasion Chamoru was announced. It has become a regular location for Nasion Chamoru meetings and vigils to honor the late Maga’låhi Santos.
