= Tamuning, Guam =

Tamuning Tamuneng
- Village
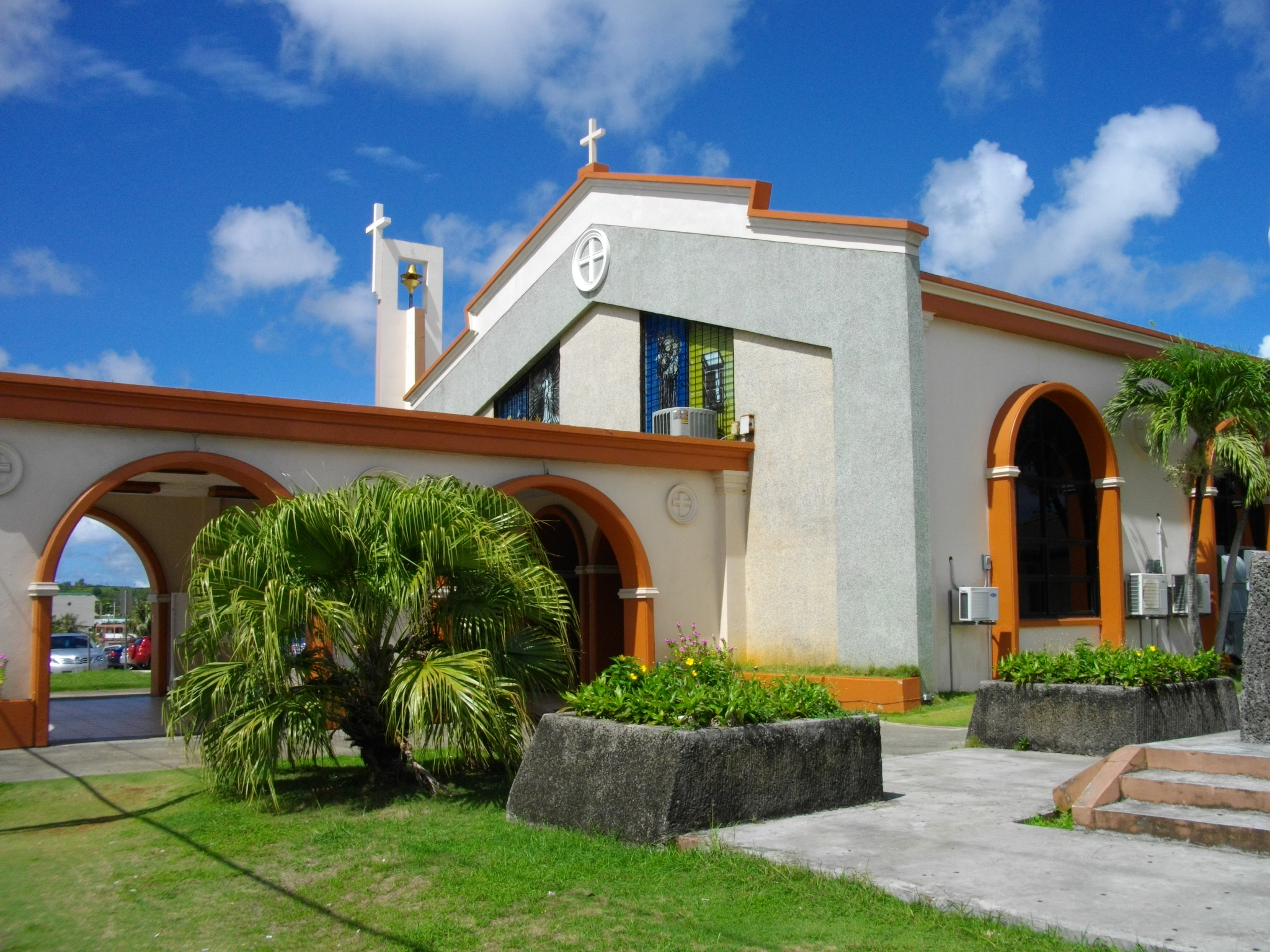
- St. Anthony Catholic Church in Tamuning

- Location of Tamuning within the Territory of Guam
- Coordinates: 13°29′02″N 144°46′36″E
- Country: United States
- Territory: Guam

Government
  - Mayor: Louise C. Rivera (R)
  - Vice Mayor: Albert M. Toves (R)

Population (2020)
  - Total: 18,489
- Time zone: UTC+10 (ChST)

Tamuning (Chamorro: Tamuneng), also known as Tamuning-Tumon-Harmon, is a village located on the western shore of the United States territory of Guam. The village of Tamuning is the economic center of Guam, containing tourist center Tumon, Harmon Industrial Park, and other commercial districts. Its central location along Marine Corps Drive, the island's main thoroughfare, has aided in its development.

Historical population
Census	Pop.	Note	%±
1960	5,944		—
1970	10,218		71.9%
1980	13,580		32.9%
1990	16,673		22.8%
2000	18,012		8.0%
2010	19,685		9.3%
2020	18,489		−6.1%

Tamuning is the site of the access roads and the old passenger terminal of Antonio B. Won Pat International Airport, the passenger airport for Guam. Fort Juan Muña, in Harmon, is a facility for the Guam Army National Guard.

The present and former locations of Guam Memorial Hospital, Guam's only civilian and government operated hospital, are in Tamuning. With Guam's only private birthing center also in the village, most modern civilian births on Guam take place in Tamuning.

== Etymology ==
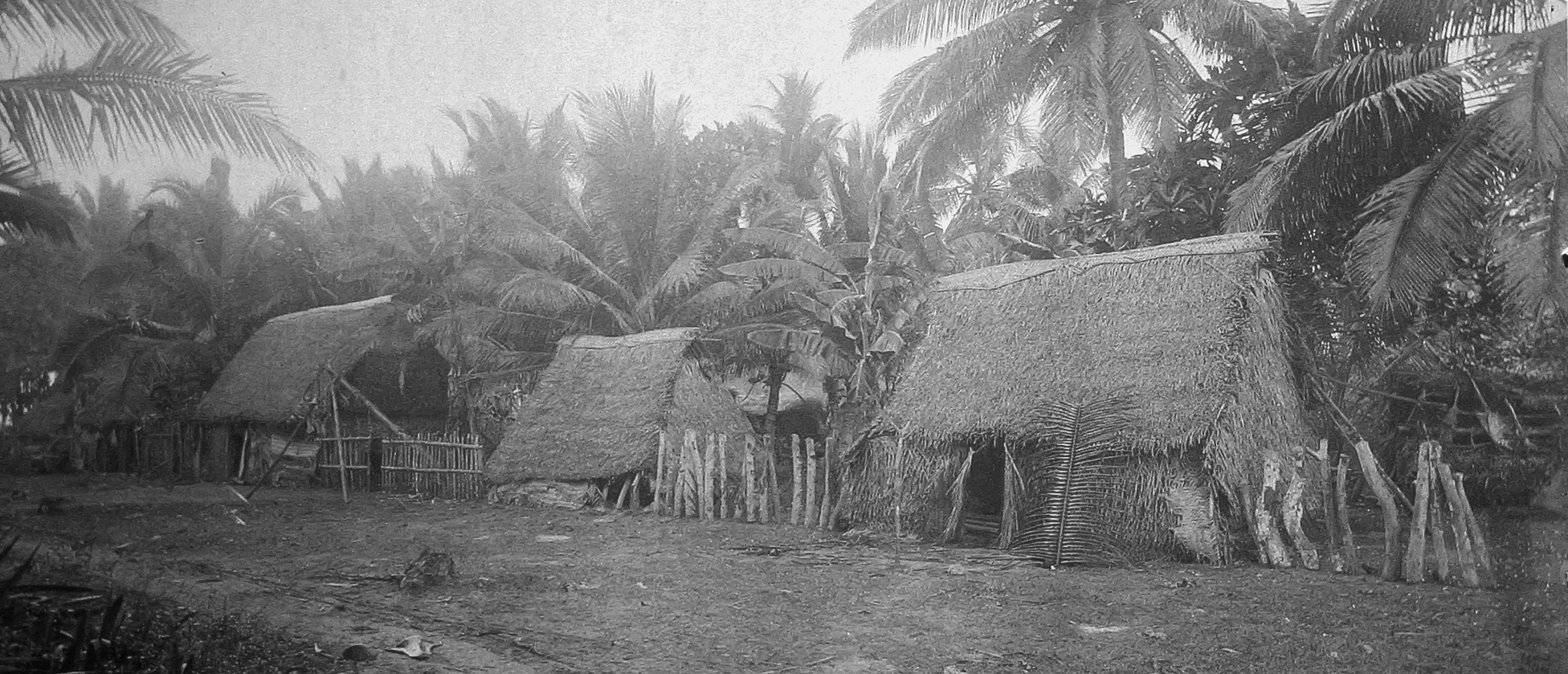
Houses of Carolininans, possibly in Tamuning, in 1899 or 1900

The ancient Chamorro word for Tamuning was Apurgan or Apotgan. "Tamuning" is a Carolinian word that was given to the area where Carolinians settled after an earthquake on January 25, 1849, near Guam caused a tsunami that devastated Lamotrek and Satawal. It is possibly the name of the clan of a Carolinian chief, though the American administration relocated the Carolinians to Saipan in the early 1900s. The area was also called Maria Christina in the 19th century.

== Geography ==
The Federal government of the United States owns portions of the land in Tamuning; the Government of Guam stated that it was one of several villages that are "characterized primarily by the large proportion of land owned by the federal government".

== Economy ==
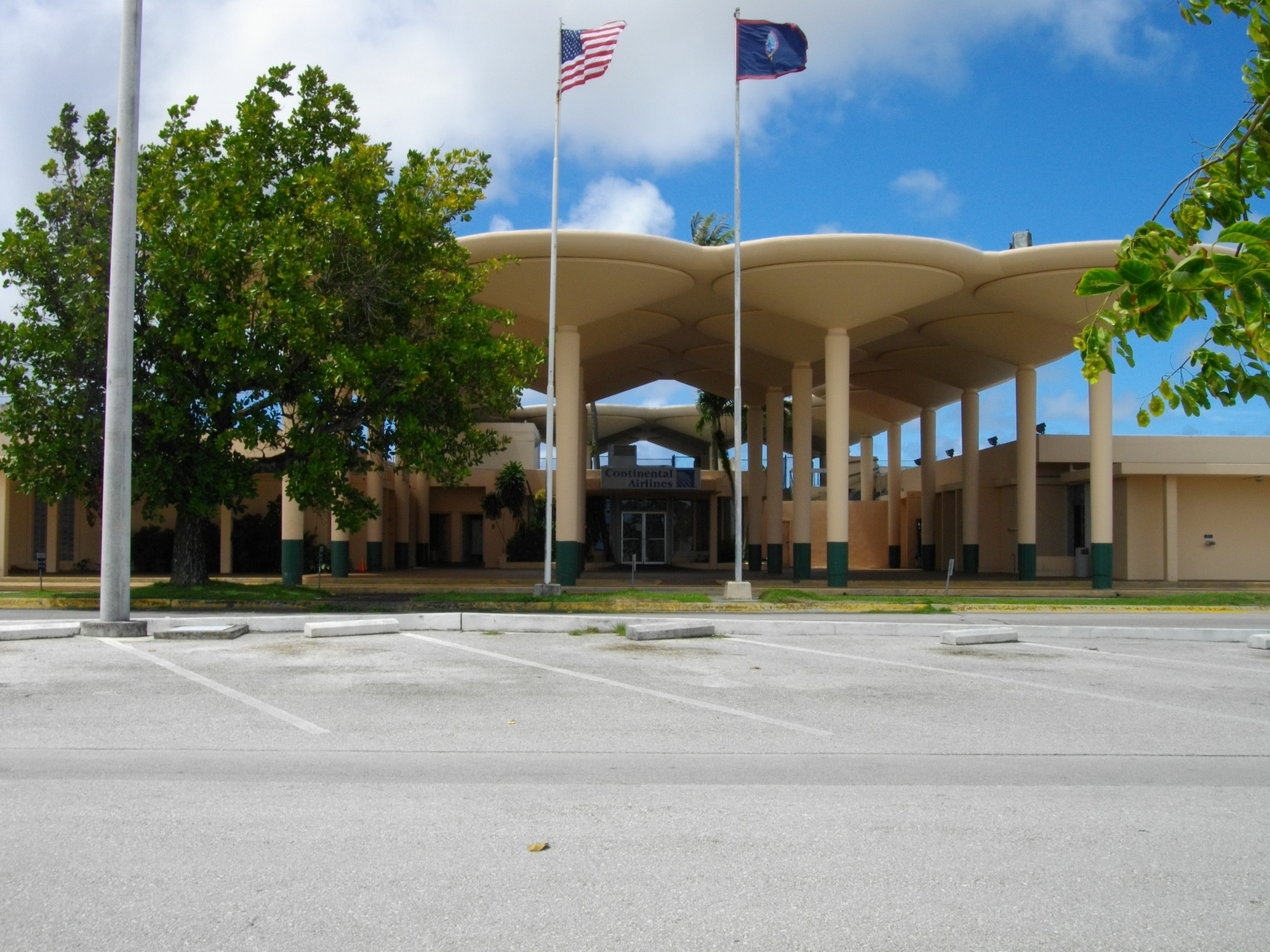
Antonio B. Won Pat International Airport old terminal - Continental Micronesia headquarters

Beside the tourist district of Tumon, Tamuning is home to the Guam Premier Outlets, one of three major shopping centers of the island. United Airlines is headquartered in the old terminal building at Antonio B. Won Pat International Airport in Tamuning. United Airlines, with about 1,400 jobs, is Guam's largest single employer.

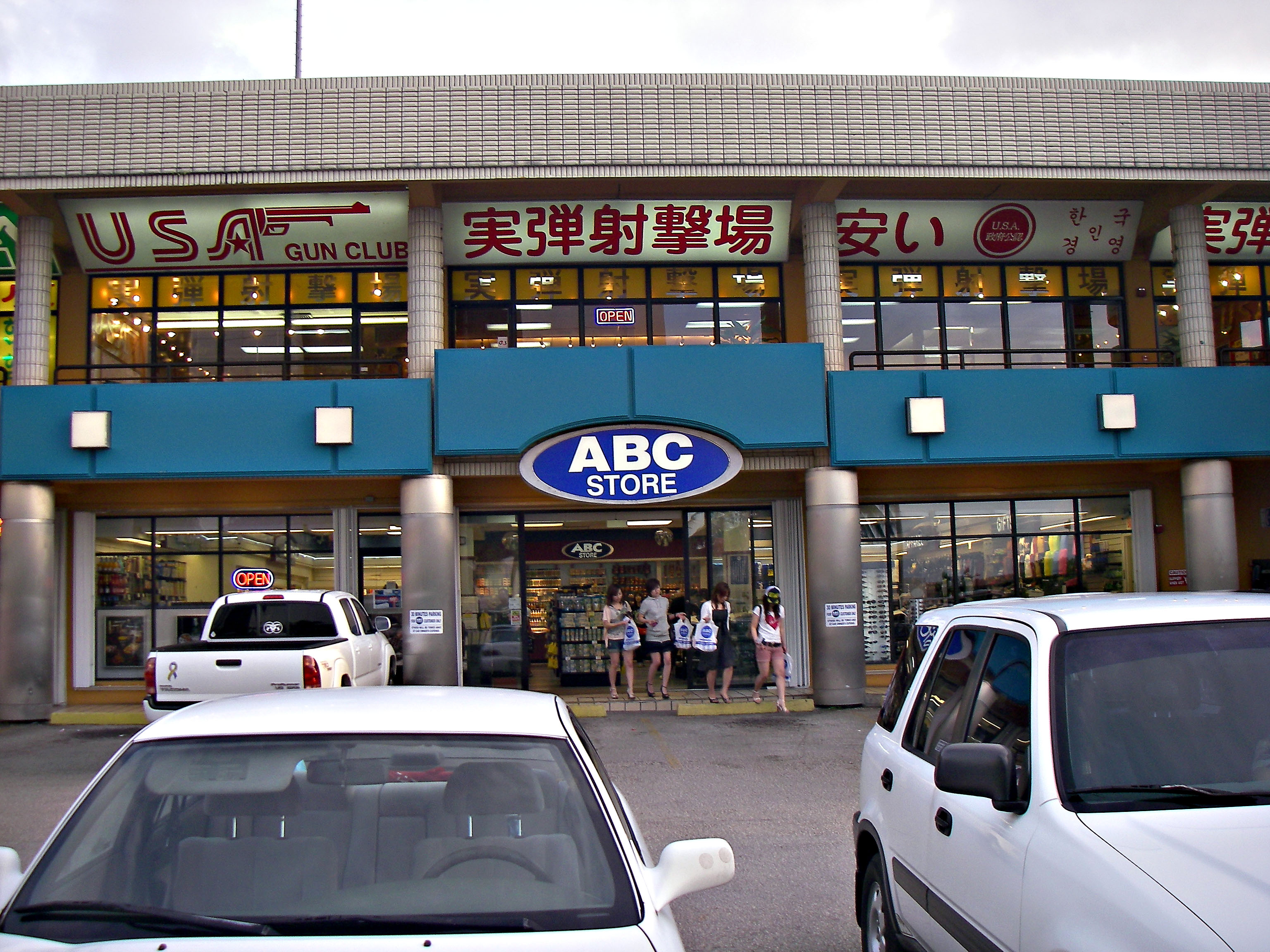
An outlet of the Hawaiian ABC store chain in Tamuning, Guam in 2009

As of January 2024, Tamuning is home to one of only six Kmart stores left worldwide.

== Demographics ==
The U.S. Census Bureau has the municipality in multiple census-designated places: Tamuning, Apotgan, Harmon Industrial Park, Oka, Tumon, and Upper Tumon.

== Infrastructure and government ==
=== Government of Guam ===
The Guam Department of Land Management and the Guam Economic Development Authority have their headquarters in the Guam International Trade Center (ITC) Building in Tamuning.

The Guam Power Authority has its headquarters in Harmon, Tamuning.

The Guam Department of Mental Health and Substance Abuse has its main facility in Tamuning, across from Guam Memorial Hospital.

=== U.S. federal government ===
The United States Postal Service operates the Tamuning Post Office at 143 Edward T. Calvo Memorial Parkway.

== Climate ==
Under the Köppen climate classification, Tamuning features a tropical rainforest climate. While the town does experience a noticeably drier season from February through April, it does not have a true dry season as all months average more than 60 mm (2.4 in) of precipitation. Tamuning averages roughly 2,300 mm (91 in) of precipitation annually, while maintaining relatively consistent temperatures throughout the course of the year.

Climate data for Tamuning, Guam
Month	Jan	Feb	Mar	Apr	May	Jun	Jul	Aug	Sep	Oct	Nov	Dec	Year
Mean daily maximum °F (°C)	85.1 (29.5)	85.3 (29.6)	86.1 (30.1)	87.0 (30.6)	87.4 (30.8)	87.8 (31.0)	87.2 (30.7)	86.9 (30.5)	86.9 (30.5)	87.1 (30.6)	86.8 (30.4)	85.9 (29.9)	86.6 (30.3)
Mean daily minimum °F (°C)	75.1 (23.9)	74.6 (23.7)	75.0 (23.9)	76.2 (24.6)	76.9 (24.9)	77.1 (25.1)	76.5 (24.7)	76.2 (24.6)	76.1 (24.5)	76.4 (24.7)	76.7 (24.8)	76.1 (24.5)	76.1 (24.5)
Average precipitation inches (mm)	4.5 (110)	3.5 (89)	2.6 (66)	3.3 (84)	5.0 (130)	6.3 (160)	10.4 (260)	14.4 (370)	13.4 (340)	12.2 (310)	8.4 (210)	5.5 (140)	89.5 (2,270)
Source: Weatherbase

== Education ==
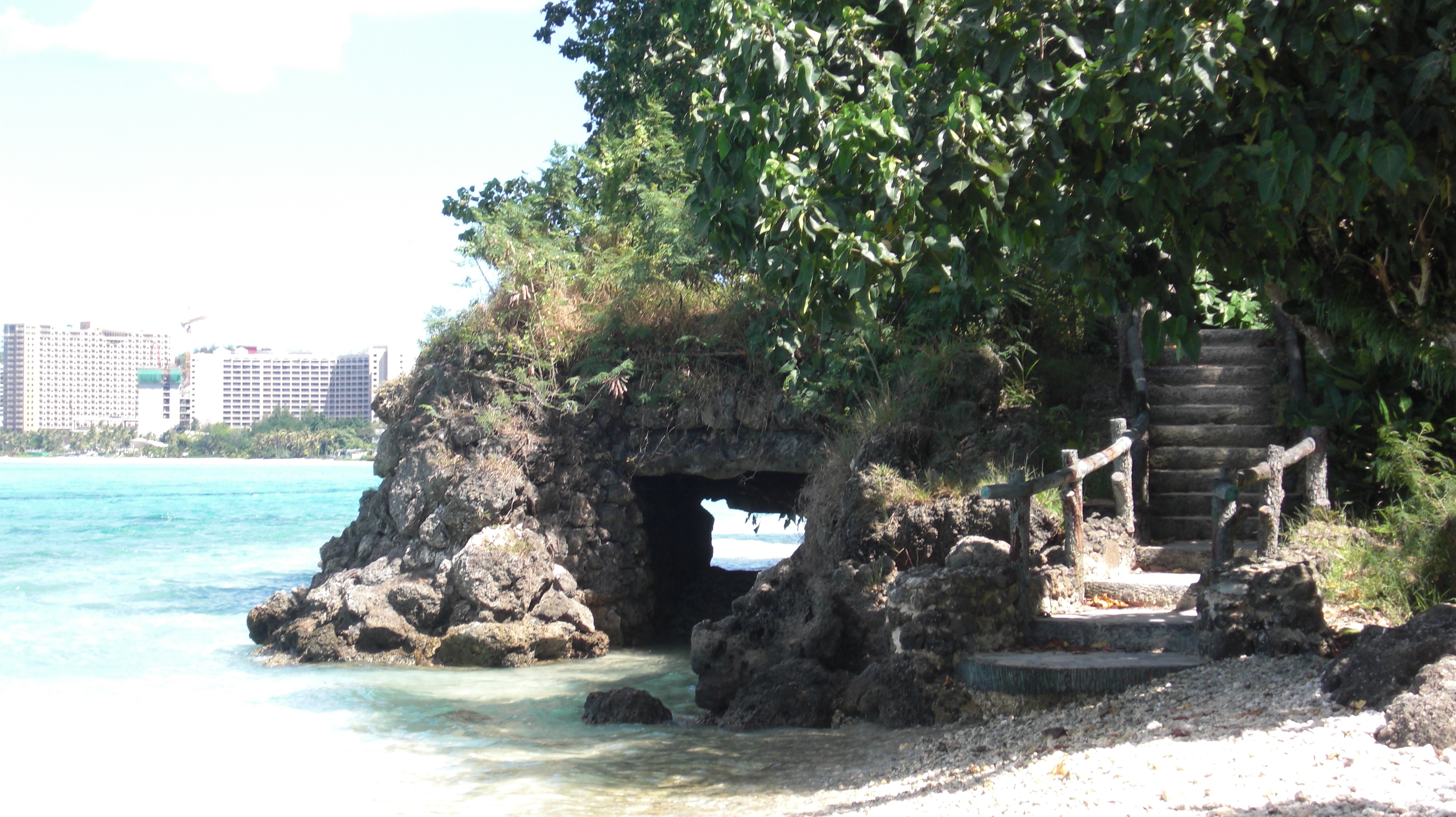
Path alongside coastal fortifications from the Japanese occupation of Guam

=== Primary and secondary schools ===
==== Public schools ====
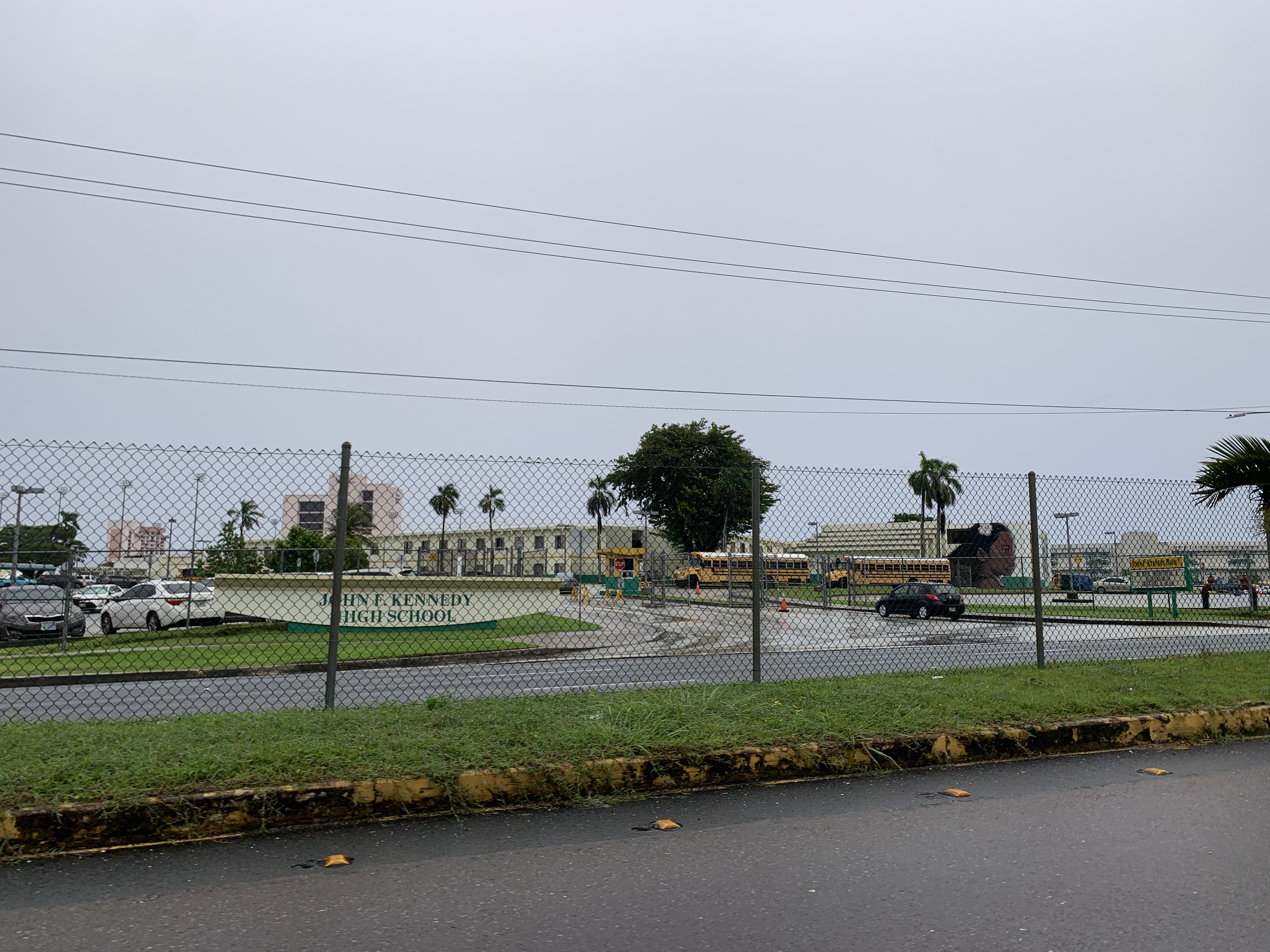
John F. Kennedy High School

Guam Public School System serves the island.

Public schools serving Tamuning:

- Chief Brodie Memorial Elementary School (Tamuning)
- Lyndon B. Johnson Elementary School (Tamuning)
- Tamuning Elementary School (Tamuning)
- Jose L. G. Rios Middle School (Piti)
- John F. Kennedy High School (Tamuning)

In regards to the Department of Defense Education Activity (DoDEA), Tamuning is in the school transportation zone for Andersen Elementary and Andersen Middle School, while Guam High School is the island's sole DoDEA high school.

==== Private schools ====
- St. John's School
- Saint Anthony Catholic School

== Diplomacy ==
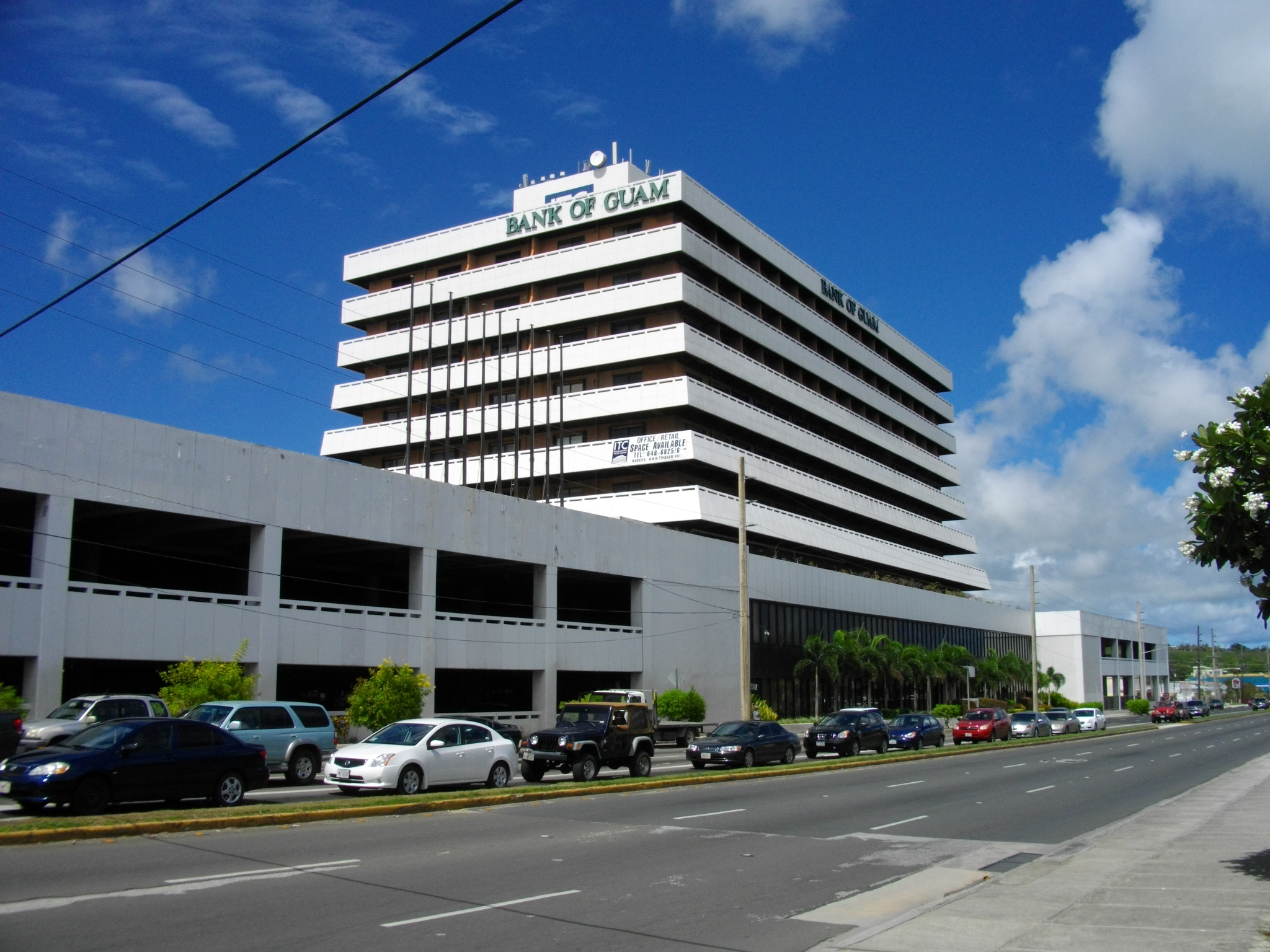
The Guam International Trade Center (ITC) building at the southwest corner of Marine Corps Drive (Route 1) and Chalan San Antonio (Route 14)

Five countries maintain consulates in Tamuning, four of which are located in the landmark Guam ITC building at 590 South Marine Corps Drive. They are:

- Federated States of Micronesia (Suite 613B, ITC Building)
- Japan (Suite 604A, ITC Building)
- Palau (Suite 615B, ITC Building)
- Philippines (Suite 601A, ITC Building)
- South Korea (125C Tun Jose Camacho Street)

== Government ==
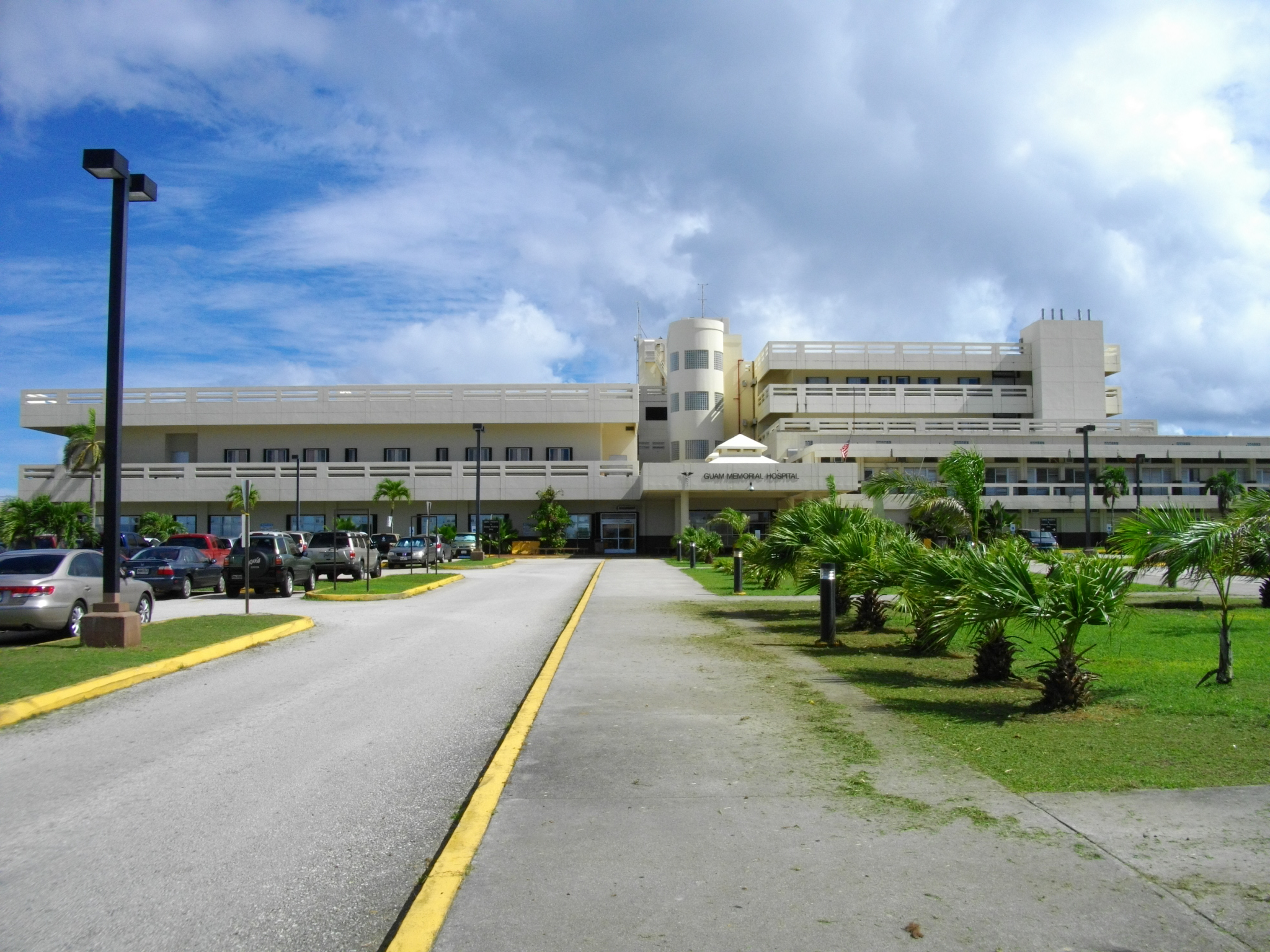
Guam Memorial Hospital

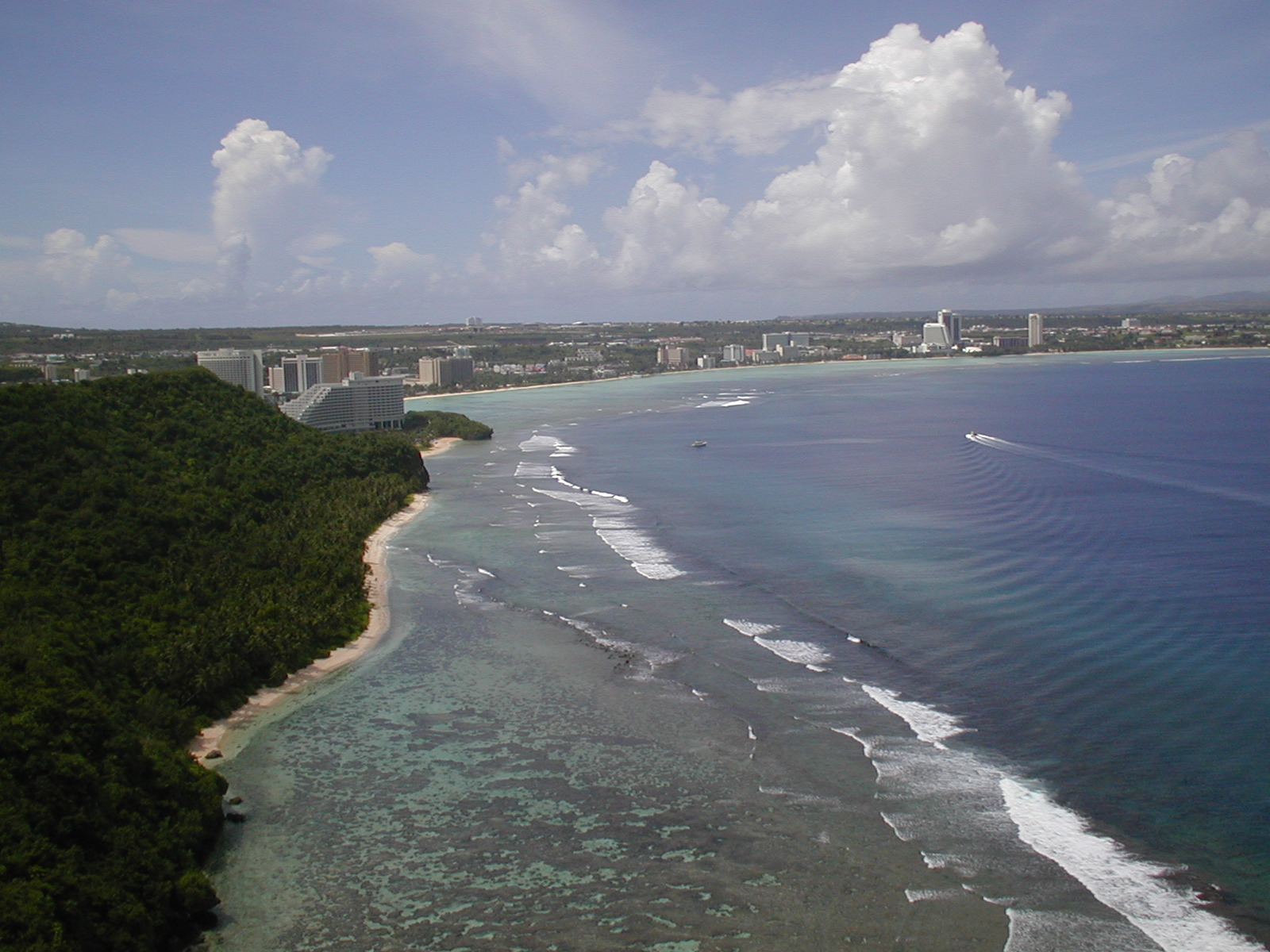
View of Tumon from Two Lovers Point

Commissioner of Tamuning
Name	Term begin	Term end
Simon A. Sanchez	1946	1948
Jose P. Castro	1948	1957
Eugenio I. San Nicolas	1957	1963
Gregorio A. Calvo	1965	1973

Mayor of Tamuning
Name	Party	Term begin	Term end
Gregorio A. Calvo	Republican	January 1, 1973	January 7, 1985
Alfredo C. Dungca	Democratic	January 7, 1985	January 6, 1997
Luis S.N. Herrero	Democratic	January 6, 1997	January 1, 2001
Concepcion "Connie" Duenas	Republican	January 1, 2001	January 3, 2005
Francisco "Frank" C. Blas	Republican	January 3, 2005	January 7, 2013
Louise C. Rivera	Republican	January 7, 2013	present

Vice Mayor of Tamuning
Name	Party	Term begin	Term end
Maria S.N. Leon Guerrero	Republican	January 1, 1973	January 3, 1977
Alfredo C. Dungca	Republican	January 3, 1977	January 7, 1985
Peter S. Calvo	Democratic	January 7, 1985	January 2, 1989
Teresita C. Borja	Democratic	January 2, 1989	January 6, 1997
Concepcion M. Duenas	Republican	January 6, 1997	January 1, 2001
Nancy Leon Guerrero	Republican	January 1, 2001	January 3, 2005
Louise C. Rivera	Republican	January 3, 2005	January 7, 2013
Kenneth C. Santos	Republican	January 7, 2013	October 30, 2020
Office vacant October 30, 2020 – January 4, 2021
Albert M. Toves	Republican	January 4, 2021	present

== Notable people ==
- Reyn Johnson (born 1990), Guamanian international footballer
- Julius Naranjo (born 1991), Guamanian weightlifter, coach, and filmmaker

== See also ==
- Villages of Guam
