= Guam Department of Parks and Recreation =

The Guam Department of Parks and Recreation (DPR, Chamorro: Dipattamenton Plaset Yan Dibuetsion) operates public parks in Guam. The agency has its headquarters in Agana Heights.

== Properties ==
In February 2021, DPR had 78 properties in its inventory, including parks, public cemeteries, and public pools. Of these, DPR Director Roke Alcantara Sr. stated 15 were being maintained by village mayors, 23 had been adopted by private firms, and 16 were not being maintained at all.

DPR properties include:

- Chinese Park, Upper Tumon
- Skate Park, Dededo
- Gov. Joseph Flores Beach Park, Ypao Tumon (Hilton Side)
- Gov. Joseph Flores Beach Park, Ypao Tumon (GVB Side)
- Padre Palomo Memorial Beach Park, Hagåtña
- Paseo Guerrero Field, Hagåtña
- Senator Angel Santos Memorial Park, Hagåtña
- Fort Santa Agueda, Agana Heights
- Tepugan (Fish Eye) Beach Park, Piti
- Nimitz Beach Park, Agat
- Fort Soledad, Umatac
- Saulaglula (Inarajan) Pool Park, Inarajan
- Talofofo Beach Park, Ipan Talofofo
- Ipan Beach Park, Ipan Talofofo
- Matapang Beach
- Agana Central Pool
- GHURA 506 Basketball Court and greenspace, Yigo
- Hagåtña Central Park tennis court
- Paseo de Susana Park basketball court
- Tamuning Basketball court

== See also ==
- Government of Guam
