= Guam Memorial Hospital =

- Guam Memorial Hospital Authority
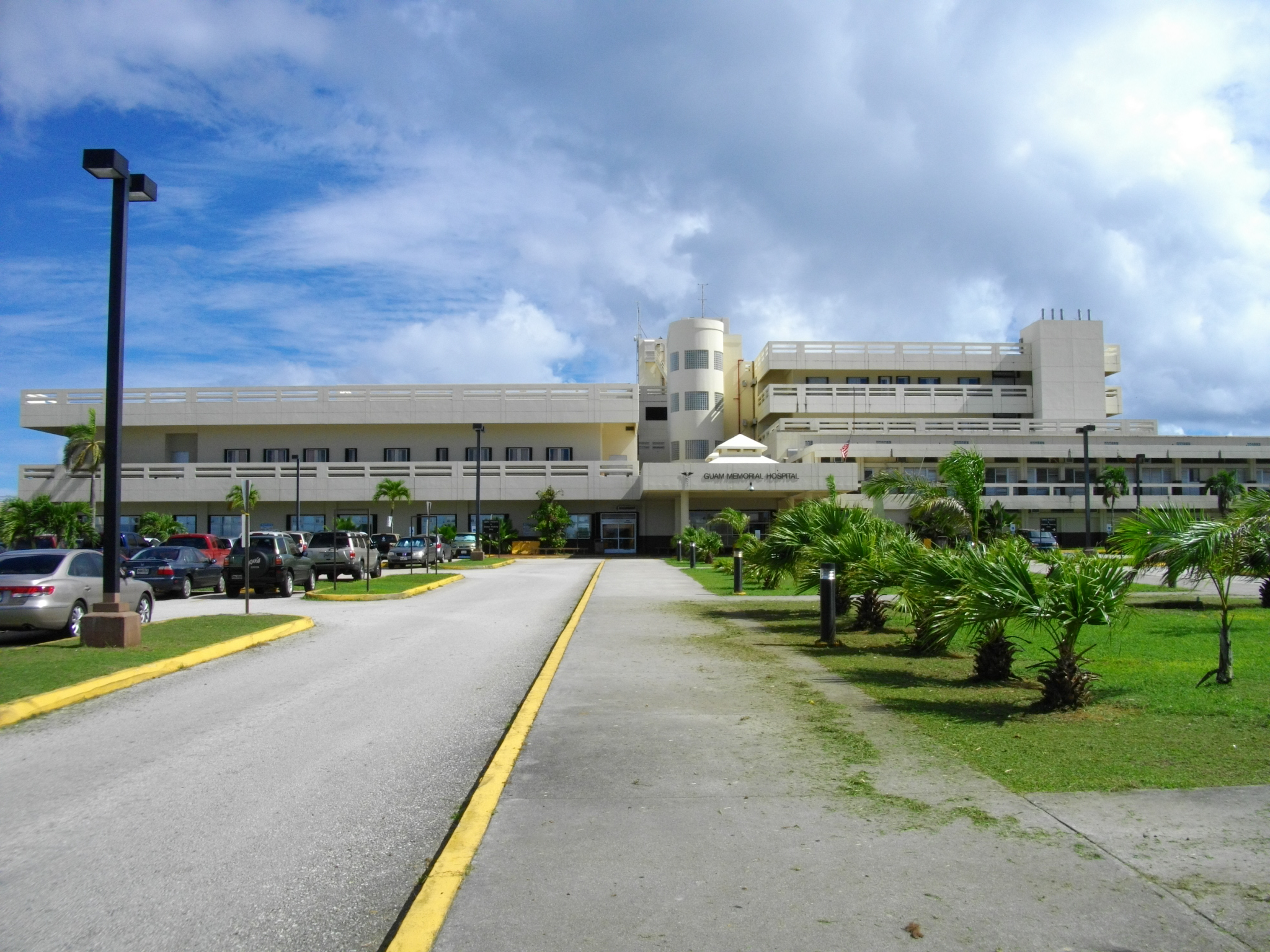
- Guam Memorial Hospital

Geography
- Location: Tamuning, Guam, Guam, United States Territories
- Coordinates: 13°30′18″N 144°46′29″E

Organisation
- Care system: Public
- Type: District General, Community

Services
- Emergency department: Yes
- Beds: 198

Helipads
- Helipad: No

History
- Founded: 1956

Links
- Website: gmha.org

Guam Memorial Hospital is a rural general hospital located in Tamuning, Guam and is the only public hospital serving the island of Guam. The hospital has 161 licensed acute care beds, plus 40 beds at its off-site, long-term care Skilled Nursing Facility (SNF).

== History ==
Guam Memorial Hospital Authority (GMHA) was created prior to 1954 to administer and operate the Guam Memorial Hospital. Its operations represent a major change in the history of the government's role in the delivery of medical care to the community. Historically, the U.S. government provided free hospital and health care services to the people of Guam through Naval Hospital Guam. The U.S. Naval forces assumed responsibility for the island's medical needs at the turn of the 20th century when the United States took formal possession of Guam.

These services continued with the U.S. Navy's delivery of care after World War II, and culminated with their donation of the first hospital facility of the Government of Guam's Department of Public Health and Welfare in the postwar era. This "Quonset Hut" facility was replaced in 1956 with the construction of the Guam Memorial Hospital at Oka Point which originally served as a nurse training facility and tuberculosis hospital. As the need for hospital services increased, this Oka Point facility was renovated to serve as a 230-bed hospital that offered acute, psychiatric and long-term care services.

In 1964, the Guam Memorial Hospital (GMH) was established as a line agency of the Government of Guam's executive branch. Its creation separated hospital services from community health services provided by the Department of Public Health and Welfare Corporation. Thirteen years later, in 1977, the Guam Memorial Hospital was created as a public corporation and has been operating since as a governmental, non-profit institution serving the people of Guam, under the governance of a board of trustees.

In 1982, a new Guam Memorial Hospital building was completed, also located at Oka Point. Prior to 1983, Guam Memorial Hospital provided mental health services. On August 19, 1983, the Guam Department of Mental Health and Substance Abuse opened and took over the responsibility of providing mental health services. Guam Memorial Hospital closed its inpatient psychiatric unit and referred patients with mental health needs to the Guam Department of Mental Health and Substance Abuse, which has since been renamed the Guam Behavioral Health and Wellness Center.

== Certification ==
The GMHA laboratory has been accredited by the College of American Pathologists since 1999. Today, the GMHA lab is also accredited by Clinical Laboratory Improvement Amendments (CLIO). Its blood bank is registered with the U.S. Food and Drug Administration. Its mammography services are accredited and certified by the American College of Radiology and the U.S. Department of Health and Human Services.

Guam Memorial Hospital became accredited by The Joint Commission on July 9, 2010 after more than 2 decades without it. The hospital had lost its JCAH accreditation in 1983. GMH lost its JCAH accreditation again on 16 July 2018. To compound its financial troubles, as of June 2019, it has faced de-certification by CMS, the federal agency that administers Medicare/Medicaid funding.
