= Guam Department of Chamorro Affairs =

Government agency

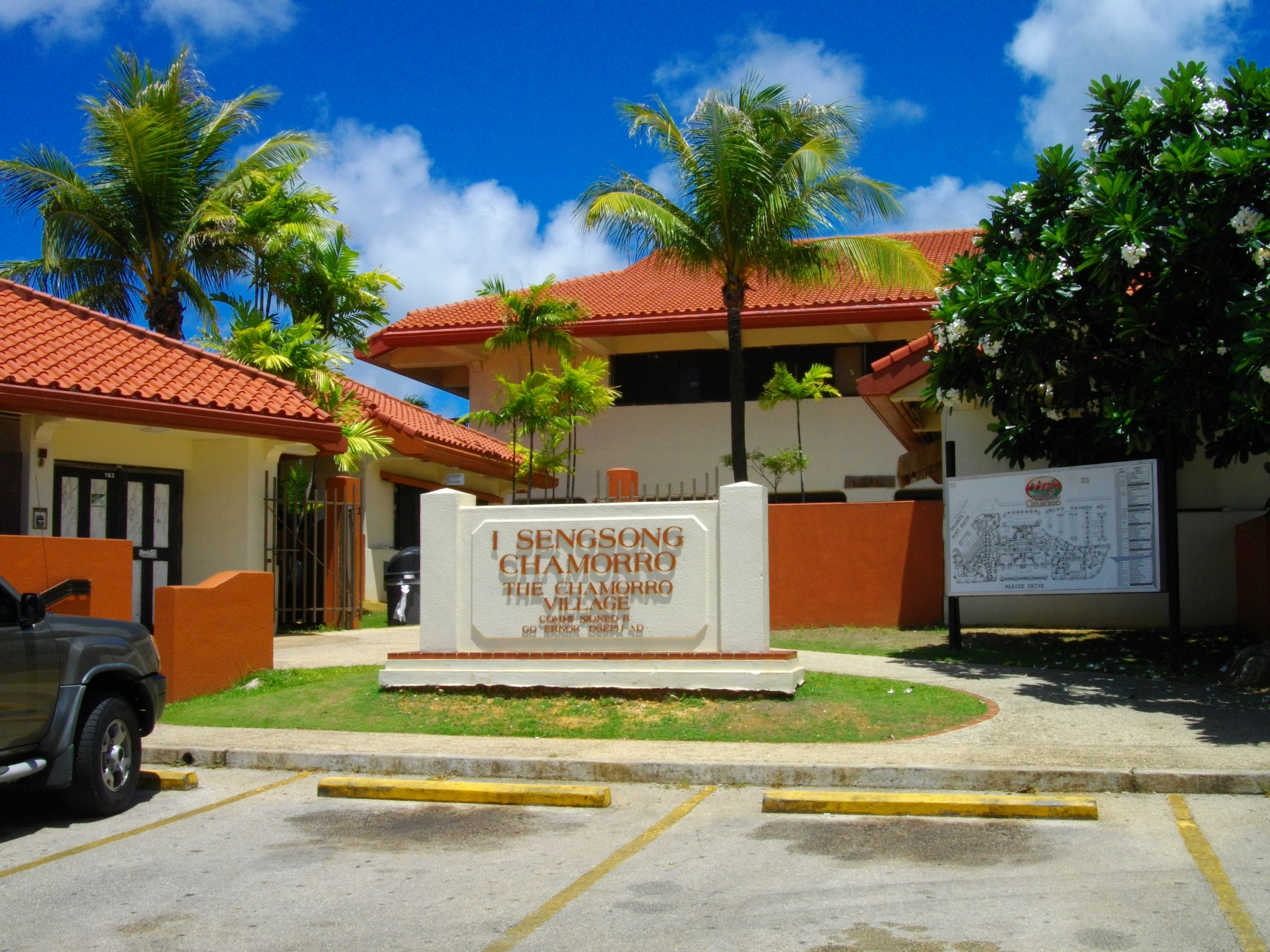
Chamorro Village, a division of the Guam Department of Chamorro Affairs

The Guam Department of Chamorro Affairs (Chamorro: Depattamenton I Kaohao Guinahan Chamorro) is an agency of the government of Guam dealing with the Chamorro people and Chamorro culture. The agency is located in the DNA Building in Hagåtña.

Chamorro Village (Chamorro: I Sengsong Chamorro), a market and a cultural attraction, is a division of the Department of Chamorro Affairs.
