= Ordnance Annex =

US naval base in Guam

Coordinates: 13°22′26.35″N 144°41′23.55″E

Ordnance Annex is a US naval base in the United States territory of Guam. It used to be known as Naval Magazine, Guam. The base is on the south-central section of the island. It occupies an area of 8,800 acres (36 km^{2}).

The entirety of the man-made Fena Lake, which provides drinking water to the southern part of the island, is within the boundaries of Ordnance Annex. It is the original location of the latte stones relocated to Latte Stone Park in Hagåtña.

== See also ==
- US military installations in Guam
