= Guam Department of Mental Health and Substance Abuse =

Government agency of Guam

The Guam Department of Mental Health and Substance Abuse (DMHSA, Chamorro: Dipattamenton Salut Hinasso Yan Abuson Amot) is a government agency of Guam. The agency's main facility is located in Tamuning, across from Guam Memorial Hospital.

Guam Senator M.K. Hartsock introduced a bill that would create the DMHSA. Hartsock's bill became public law 17-21, and the DMHSA was established on August 19, 1983. Prior to that date, the Guam Memorial Hospital provided mental health services. Later, Guam Memorial Hospital closed their psychiatric unit and Guam Department of Mental Health became the only location for adult inpatient psychiatric services. Guam Department of Mental Health currently provides most services free of charge. They have the capacity for two inpatient acute adult inpatient units and one acute child inpatient unit. They have several outpatient programs, residential programs, parent support services, suicide prevention services, substance abuse treatment, and more. They have both general psychiatrists and child psychiatrists on staff.
