= 2007 United States Air Force nuclear weapons incident =

Accidental loading of warheads onto an aircraft

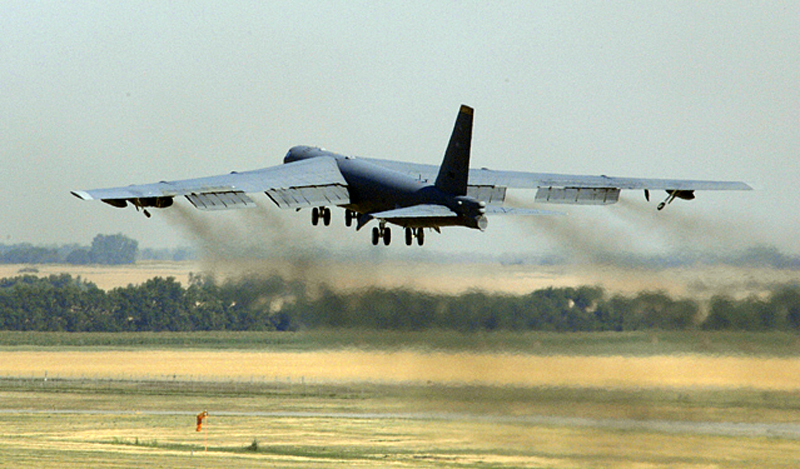
- A B-52H bomber taking off from Minot Air Force Base in August 2007
Date	29–30 August 2007
Location	Minot AFB, North Dakota, and Barksdale AFB, Louisiana 48°25′03″N 101°21′00″W
Result	Six nuclear warheads mishandled and unaccounted for, or improperly secured, for approximately 36 hours

On 29 August 2007, six AGM-129 ACM cruise missiles, each loaded with a W80-1 variable yield nuclear warhead, were mistakenly loaded onto a United States Air Force (USAF) B-52H heavy bomber at Minot Air Force Base in North Dakota and transported to Barksdale Air Force Base in Louisiana. The nuclear warheads in the missiles were supposed to have been removed before the missiles were taken from their storage bunker. The missiles with the nuclear warheads were not reported missing and remained mounted to the aircraft at both Minot and Barksdale for 36 hours. During this period, the warheads were not protected by the various mandatory security precautions for nuclear weapons.

The incident was reported to the top levels of the United States military and referred to by observers as a Bent Spear incident, which indicates a nuclear weapon incident below the more severe Broken Arrow tier.

In response to the incident, the United States Department of Defense (DoD) and USAF conducted an investigation, the results of which were released on 19 October 2007. The investigation concluded that nuclear weapons handling standards and procedures had not been followed by numerous USAF personnel involved in the incident. As a result, four USAF commanders were relieved of their commands, numerous other USAF personnel were disciplined or decertified to perform certain types of sensitive duties, and further cruise missile transport missions from—and nuclear weapons operations at—Minot Air Force Base were suspended. In addition, the USAF issued new nuclear weapons handling instructions and procedures.

Separate investigations by the Defense Science Board and a USAF "blue ribbon" panel reported that concerns existed on the procedures and processes for handling nuclear weapons within the Department of Defense but did not find any failures with the security of United States nuclear weapons. Based on this and other incidents, on 5 June 2008, Secretary of the Air Force Michael Wynne and Chief of Staff of the Air Force General T. Michael Moseley were asked for their resignations, which they gave. In October 2008, in response to recommendations by a review committee, the USAF announced the creation of Air Force Global Strike Command to control all USAF nuclear bombers, missiles, and personnel.

== Background ==
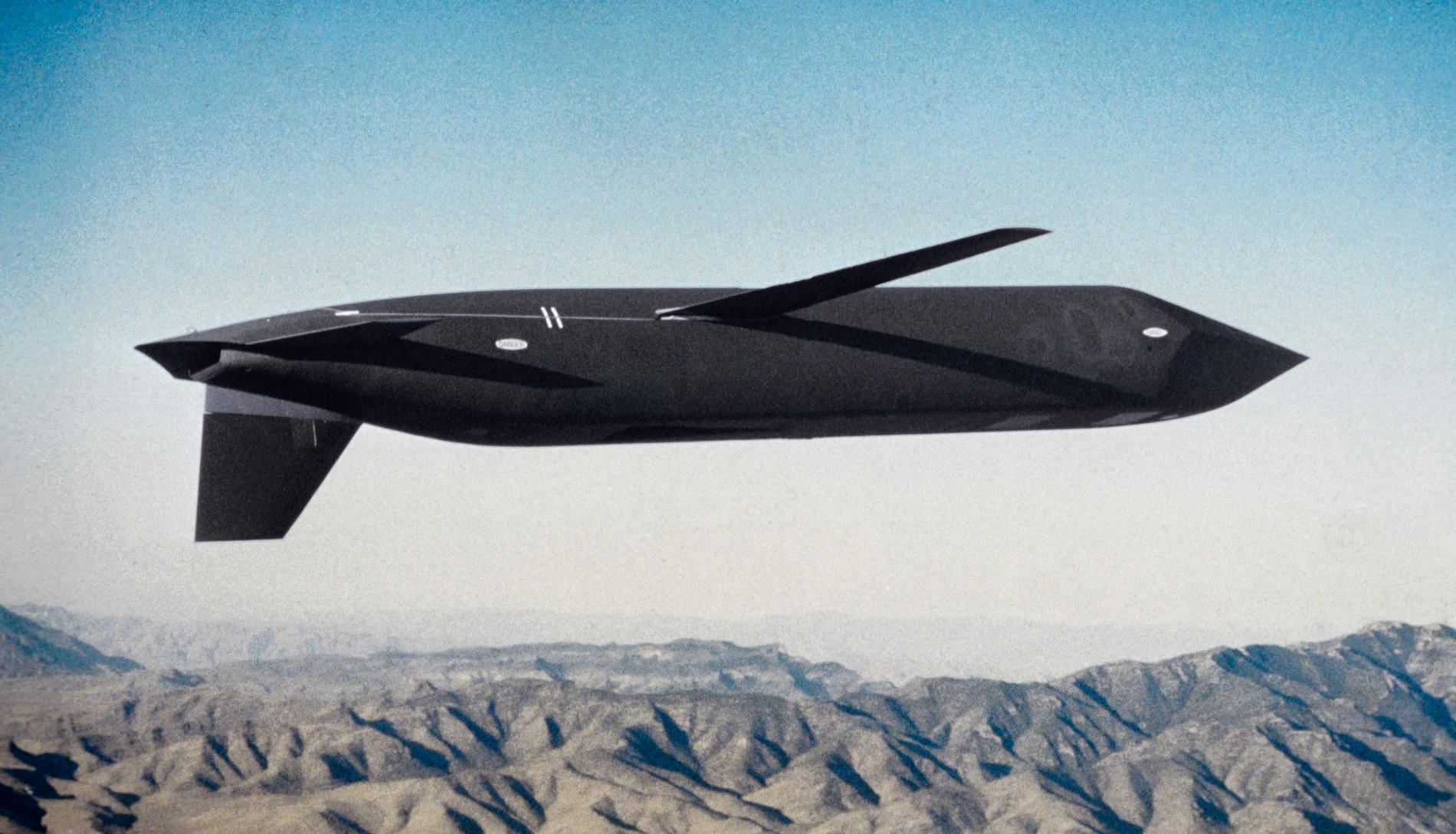
AGM-129A cruise missile in flight

At the time of the incident, the 5th Bomb Wing was commanded by Colonel Bruce Emig, the 2nd Bomb Wing by Colonel Robert Wheeler, the 8th Air Force by Lieutenant General Robert J. Elder Jr., and Air Combat Command (ACC) by General Ronald Keys.

The 5th Bomb Wing, according to the USAF's statement on the wing's mission, served with its B-52H bombers as part of the USAF's conventional and strategic combat force. The "strategic" portion of the 5th's mission included the ability to deliver nuclear weapons against potential targets worldwide. Thus, Minot Air Force Base stored and maintained a ready arsenal of nuclear bombs, nuclear warheads, and associated delivery systems, including the AGM-129 Advanced Cruise Missile.

The AGM-129 ACM was fielded in 1987 as a stealthy cruise missile platform to deliver the W80-1 variable yield nuclear warhead. Although originally designed to equip the B-1B Lancer bomber, the AGM-129 was redesignated so that it would only be carried by the B-52H, mounted on external pylons on the wings or internally in the bomb bay. In March 2007, the USAF decided to retire its AGM-129 complement to help comply with international arms-control treaties and to replace them with AGM-86 ALCM missiles. To do so, the USAF began to transport its AGM-129s stored at Minot to Barksdale Air Force Base in Louisiana by B-52s for ultimate disposal. According to The Washington Post, by 29 August 2007, more than 200 AGM-129s had been shipped from Minot to Barksdale in this manner.

== Incident ==
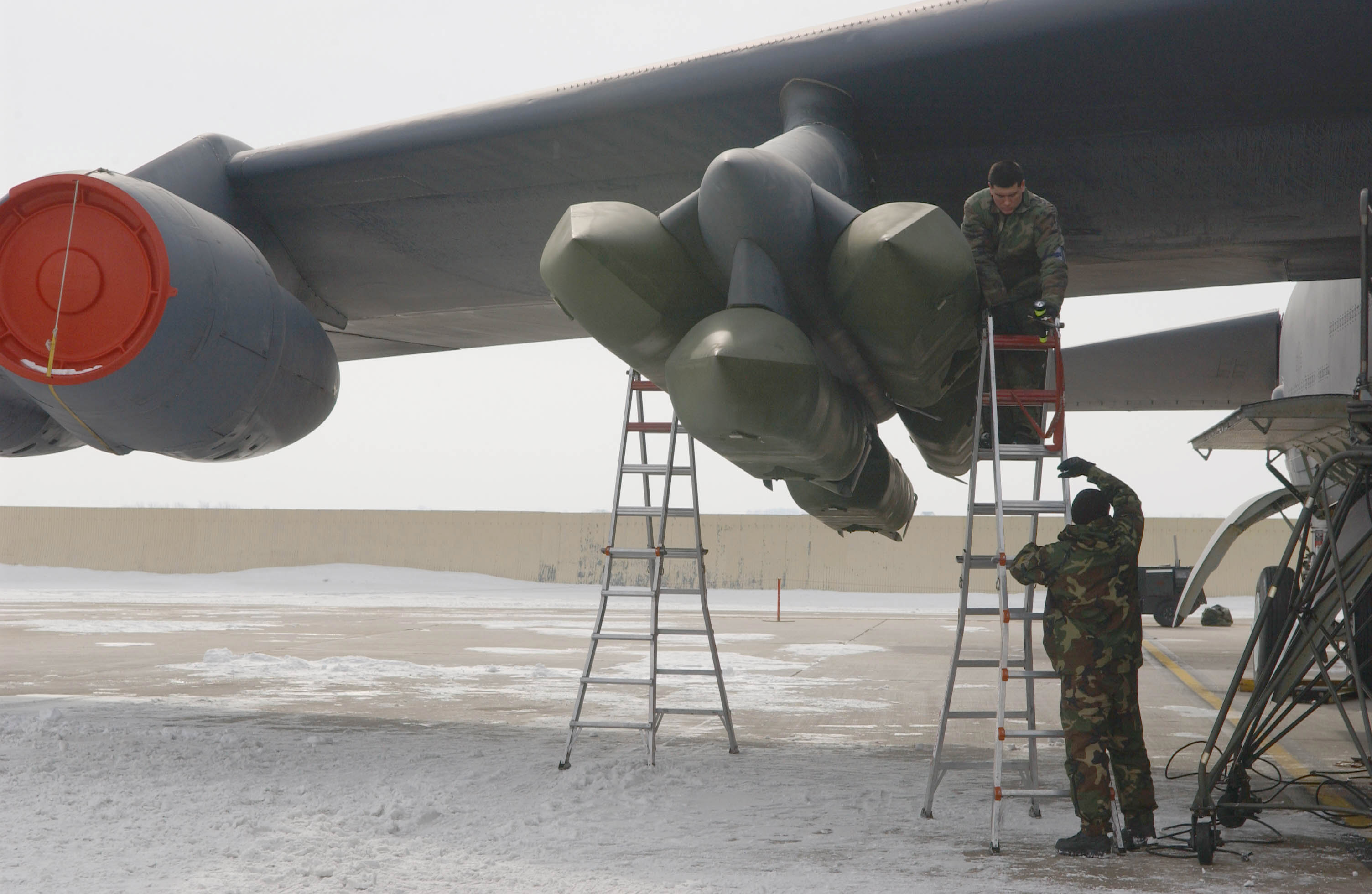
An AGM-129 pylon is loaded onto the wing of a B-52 at Minot

Between 08:00 and 09:00 (local time) on 29 August 2007, a group of USAF airmen, called the breakout crew, entered one of the weapons storage bunkers at Minot to prepare AGM-129 missiles for transport to Barksdale. That day's missile transport, the sixth of twelve planned ferry missions, was to have consisted of twelve AGM-129s, installed with training warheads, with six missiles per pylon and one pylon mounted under each wing of a Barksdale-assigned, 2nd Bomb Wing B-52 aircraft. When the airmen entered the bunker, six live warheads were still installed on their missiles, as opposed to having been replaced with the dummy training warheads. A later investigation found that the reason for the error was that the electronic production system for tracking the missiles "had been subverted in favor of an informal process that did not identify the pylon as prepared for the flight." The airmen assigned to handle the missiles used outdated materials that contained incorrect information on the status of the missiles. The missiles originally planned for movement had been replaced by missiles closer to expiration dates for limited-life components, which was standard procedure. The change in missiles had been reflected on the movement plan but not in the documents used for internal work coordination processes in the bunker.

Although the breakout crew in the weapons storage began to inspect the missiles, the transport crew arrived early, hooked up the pylons and towed them away. They did so without performing an inspection, or ensuring that the missiles had been inspected and cleared for removal. The munitions control center failed to verify that the pylon had received proper clearance and inspection and approved the pylon for loading on the B-52 at 09:25. After the eight hours it took to attach the pylons, the aircraft with the missiles loaded then remained parked overnight at Minot for 15 hours without the special guard required for nuclear weapons.

On the morning of 30 August one of the transport aircraft's flight officers, a Barksdale-assigned B-52 instructor radar navigator, closely inspected the six missiles on the right wing only, which were all properly loaded with training warheads. The B-52 command pilot did not do a final verification check before signing the manifest listing the cargo as a dozen unarmed AGM-129 missiles to depart Minot.

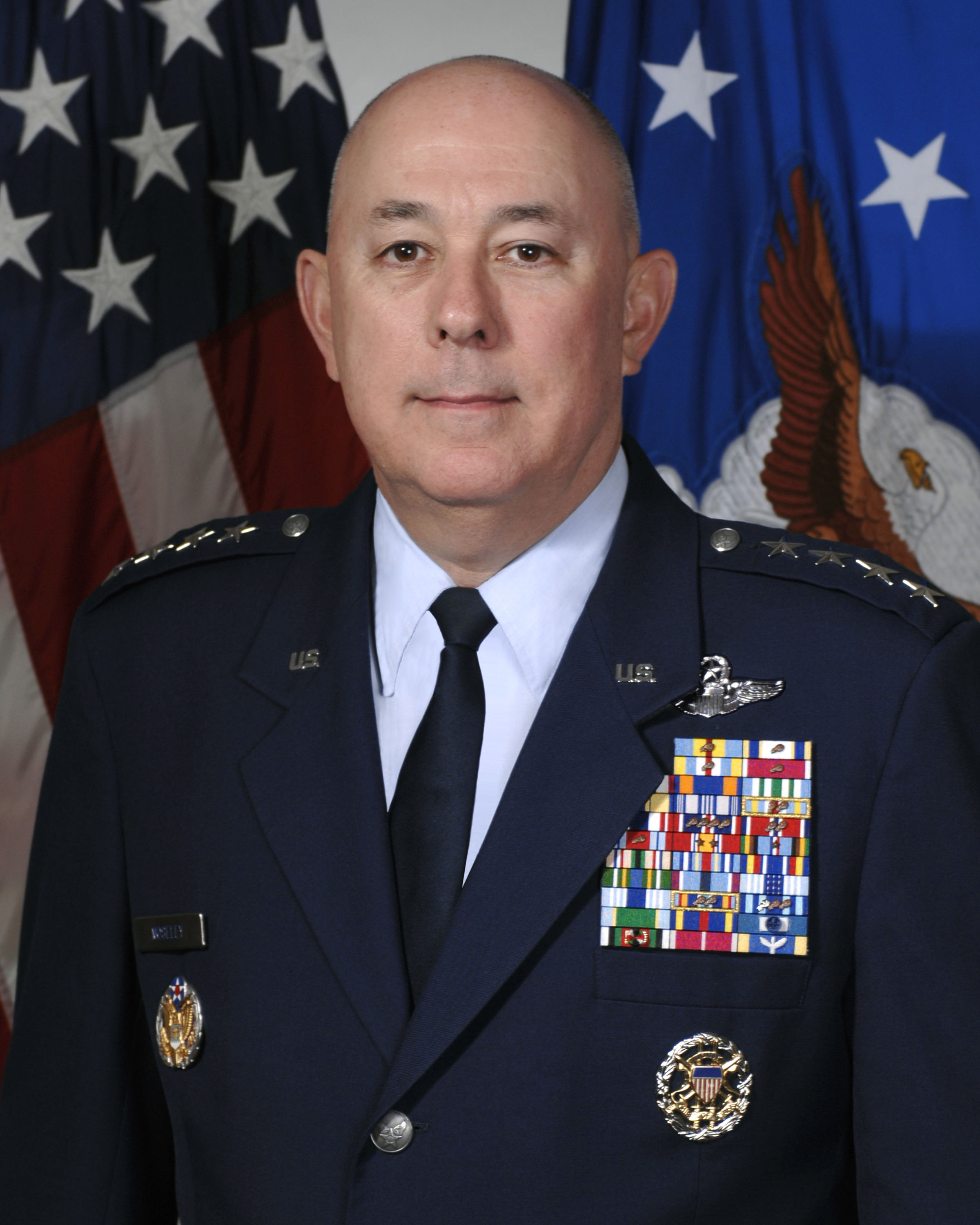
General T. Michael Moseley, USAF chief of staff at the time of the incident

The B-52 departed Minot at 08:40 and landed at Barksdale at 11:23 (local times) on 30 August. The aircraft remained parked and without a special guard until 20:30, when a munitions team arrived to remove the missiles. After a member of the munitions crew noticed something unusual about some of the missiles, a "skeptical" supervisor determined that nuclear warheads were present and ordered them secured and the incident was reported, 36 hours after the missiles were removed from the bunker at Minot.

The incident was reported to the National Military Command Center as a Bent Spear incident. General T. Michael Moseley, Chief of Staff of the United States Air Force, quickly called United States Secretary of Defense Robert Gates, on 31 August to inform him about the incident. Gates requested daily updates regarding the investigation and informed President Bush about the incident. The incident was the first of its kind in forty years in the United States and was later described by the media as "one of the worst breaches in U.S. nuclear weapons security in decades".

== Response by the U.S. government ==
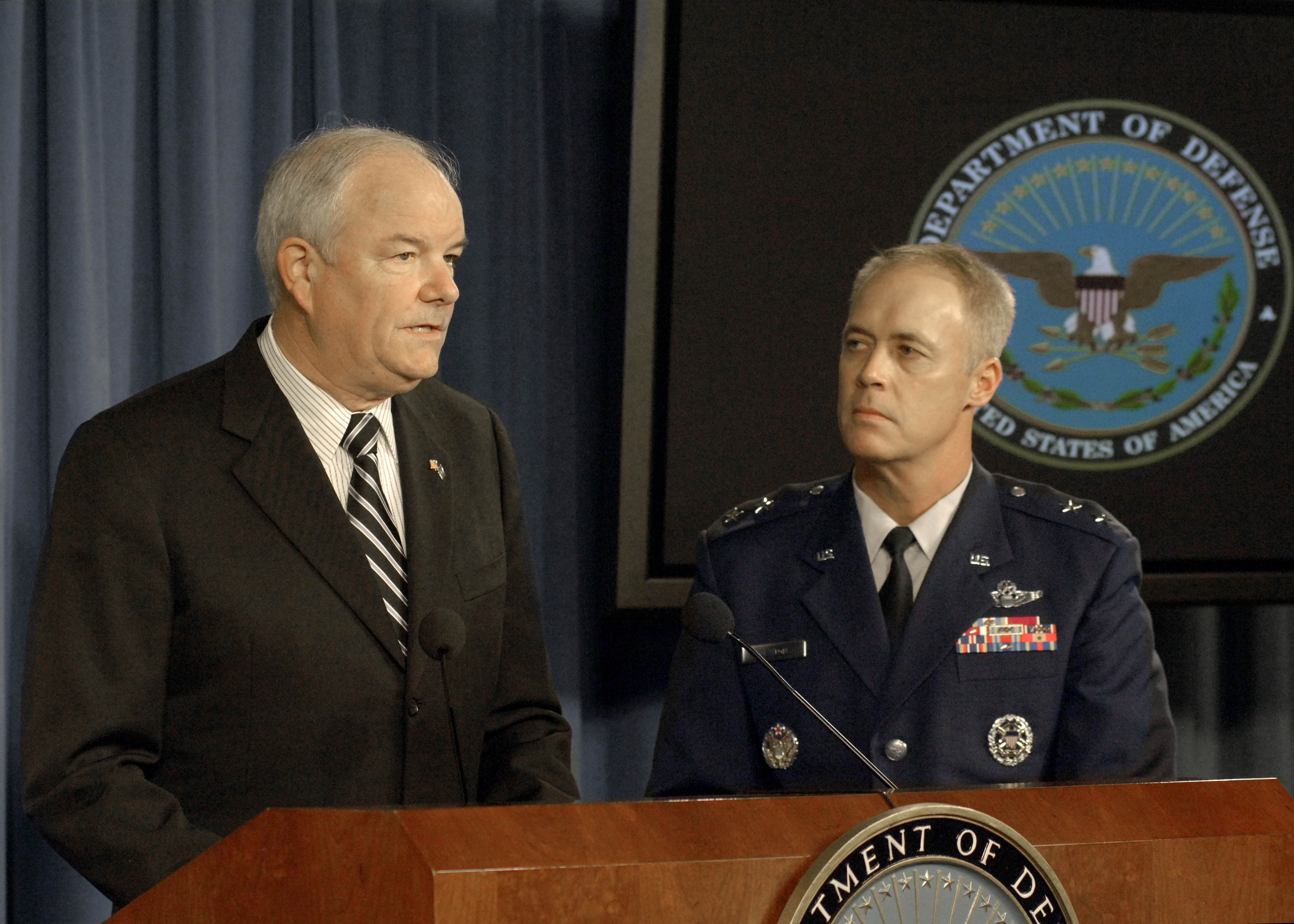
USAF Secretary Michael Wynne and Major General Richard Newton brief the results of the USAF investigation into the incident at the Pentagon on 19 October 2007

The USAF and Department of Defense at first decided to conceal the incident, in part because of the USAF policy not to comment on the storage or movement of nuclear weapons and an apparent belief that the incident would not generate much public concern. In fact, the initial DoD incident report contained the statement, "No press interest anticipated." Details of the incident were then leaked by unknown DoD officials to the Military Times newspaper, which published a small article about the incident on 5 September 2007.

In response, a 5 September news briefing at the Pentagon by Press Secretary Geoff Morrell stated that at no time was the public in any danger and that military personnel had custody of the weapons at all times. The USAF announced that within days of the incident, the USAF relieved the Minot munitions squadron commander of duty and eventually disciplined 25 airmen. USAF Major General Doug Raaberg was assigned by General Keys to lead an investigation into the incident. The USAF inventory of nuclear warheads was checked to ensure that all warheads were accounted for. In addition, the DoD announced that a Pentagon-appointed scientific advisory panel, called the Defense Science Board, would study the mishap as part of a larger review of procedures for handling nuclear weapons. On 28 September, the USAF announced that General Keys was retiring and would be replaced as ACC commander by General John Corley, effective 2 October.

On 19 October 2007, United States Secretary of the Air Force Michael Wynne and USAF Major General Richard Newton, deputy chief of staff for operations, plans, and requirements, announced the investigation report findings, stating that "there has been an erosion of adherence to weapons-handling standards at Minot Air Force Base and at Barksdale Air Force Base" and that "a limited number of airmen at both locations failed to follow procedures." Colonel Emig, the commander of the 5th Bomb Wing, Colonel Cynthia Lundell, the commander of the 5th Maintenance Group at Minot, and Colonel Todd Westhauser, the commander of Barksdale's 2d Operations Group, and four senior non-commissioned officers from the 5th Munitions Squadron "received administrative action" and were relieved of their commands or positions and reassigned. All of the 5th Bomb Wing personnel were stripped of their certifications to handle nuclear and other sensitive weaponry and to conduct "specific missions". Sixty-five airmen of varying ranks lost their Personnel Reliability Program certifications. Tactical ferry operations were suspended. The inspector general offices of all USAF Major Commands that handle nuclear weapons were directed to conduct immediate "Limited Nuclear Surety Inspections (LNSIs) at every nuclear-capable unit" with oversight provided by the Defense Threat Reduction Agency.

The new ACC commander, General Corley, referred the matter to USAF Lieutenant General Norman Seip, commander of the 12th Air Force, as a court-martial convening authority to determine if additional charges or actions would be taken against any of the personnel involved in the incident. Seip later closed the investigation without recommending criminal charges against anyone involved.

Retired USAF Chief of Staff General Larry Welch was asked by Gates, who had reportedly raised concerns with USAF officials that the original investigation may have unfairly limited blame to midlevel officers, to lead the Defense Science Board advisory panel that would study the mishap as part of a larger review of procedures and policies for handling nuclear weapons. In addition, the USAF chartered a "blue ribbon" review chaired by USAF Major General Polly Peyer and consisting of 30 additional personnel to "make recommendations as to how we can improve the Air Force's capability to safely and securely perform our nuclear weapons responsibility". Furthermore, the United States Congress requested that the DoD and the United States Department of Energy conduct a bottom-up review of nuclear procedures.

== Aftermath ==
=== USAF actions ===
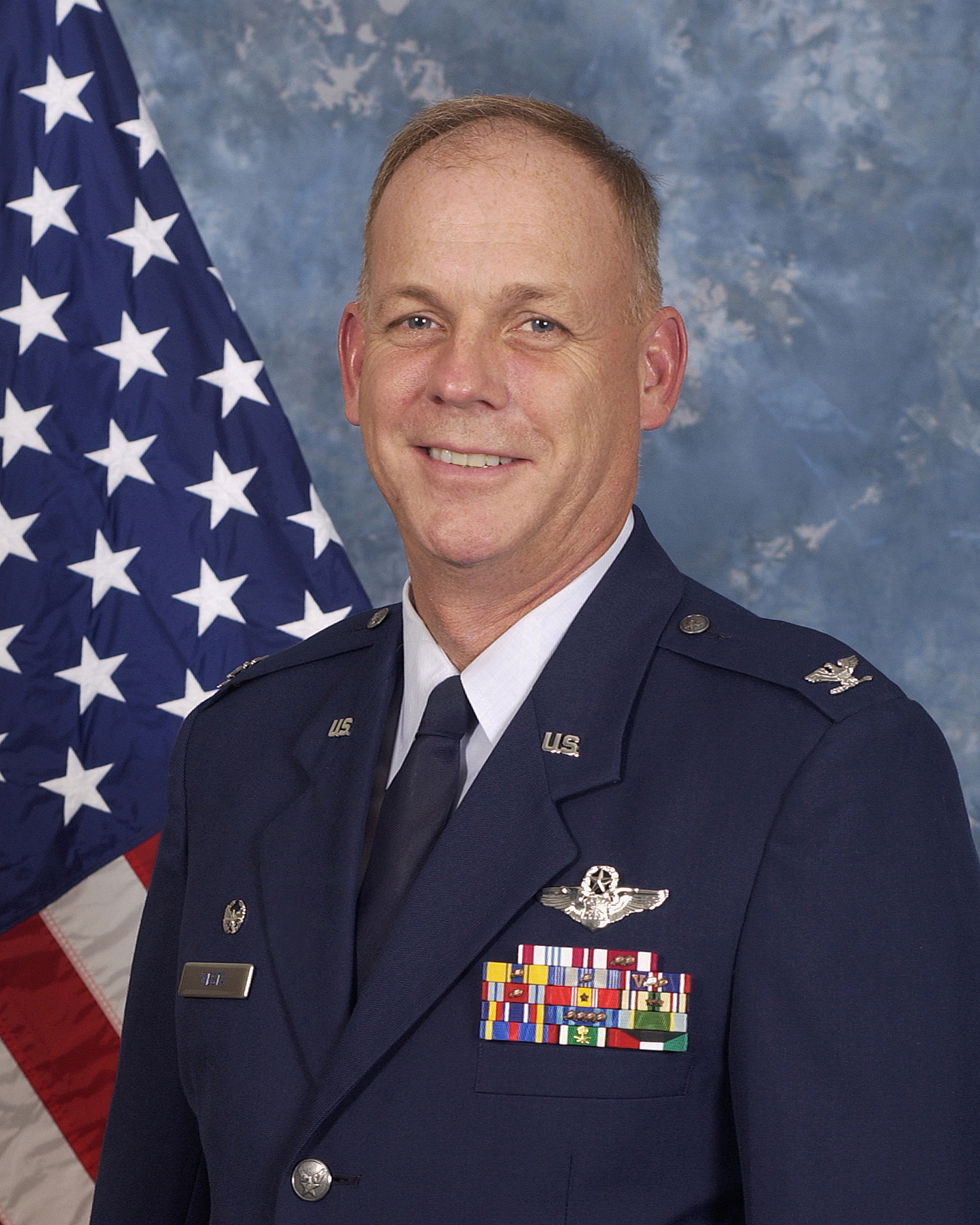
Colonel Joel Westa became the commander of the 5th Bomb Wing in the wake of the incident.

On 24 October 2007, Secretary of the Air Force Wynne told the House Armed Services Committee that he believed that the 5th Bomb Wing could be recertified and could resume ferrying the AGM-129 cruise missiles to Barksdale for retirement. He did not provide a timeline for that recertification process. On 1 November 2007, Colonel Joel Westa took command of the 5th Bomb Wing. That same day, General Keys retired from the Air Force.

Personnel from Barksdale's 2nd Bomb Wing temporarily took over maintenance duties of Minot's nuclear stockpile until the 5th Bomb Wing could be recertified. A nuclear surety inspection (NSI), required for recertification, originally scheduled for the 5th Bomb Wing for 23 January 2008, was postponed after the wing failed an initial NSI that took place on 16 December 2007. Another initial NSI was completed on 29 March and Corley recertified the wing on 31 March 2008. A full NSI was scheduled for May 2008. The wing needed to regain its certification in order to hold the full NSI. Units handling nuclear weapons must pass NSIs every 18 months in order to retain their certifications.

The USAF issued a new policy directive regarding the handling of nuclear weapons and delivery systems, which prohibits the storing of nuclear armed and nonnuclear armed weapons in the same storage facility. The directive further instructs that all nonnuclear munitions and missiles must be labeled with placards clearly stating that they are not armed with nuclear warheads. Wing commanders are now charged with approving any movement of nuclear weapons from weapons storage areas and must appoint a single individual as a munitions accountability system officer and weapons custodian. All units that handle nuclear weapons must develop a coordinated visual inspection checklist. The policy further directs that airmen charged with handling or maintaining nuclear weapons cannot be on duty for longer than 12 hours, unless during an emergency, when their duty period can be extended to a maximum of 16 hours. The USAF has since instituted a program of surprise inspections at nuclear-armed bases.

=== Review reports ===
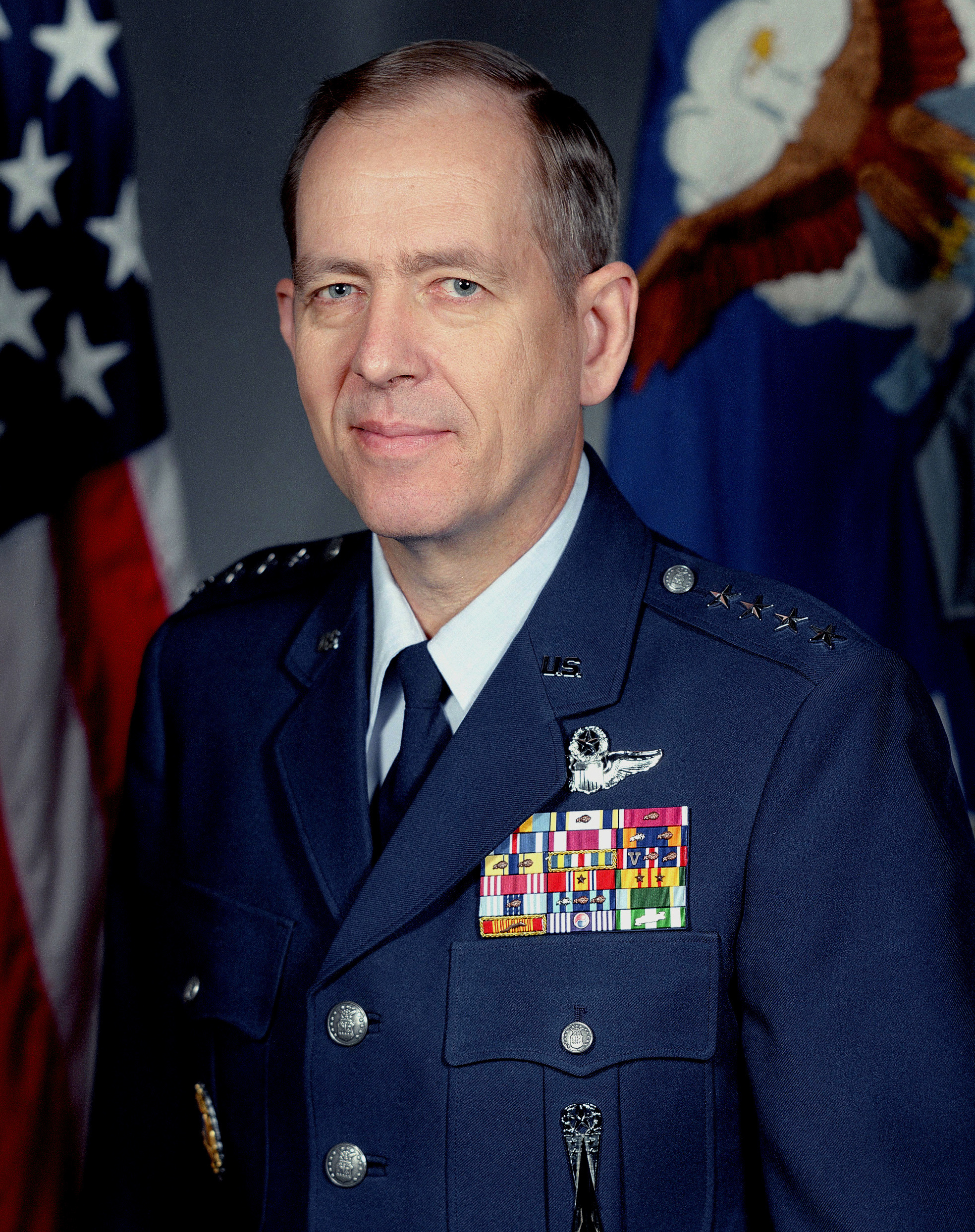
General Larry Welch (1988)

Welch and Peyer briefed the results of their reviews before the United States Senate Committee on Armed Services on 12 February 2008. In addition to Welch and Peyer, Lieutenant General Daniel Darnell, USAF Deputy Chief of Staff for Air, Space and Information Operations, and Major General Raaberg testified and answered questions from the Senate committee's members. During the hearing, Welch stated that "the military units responsible for handling the bombs are not properly inspected and, as a result, may not be ready to perform their missions." He added, "If you look at all the areas and all the ways that we have to store and handle these weapons in order to perform the mission, it just requires, we believe, more resources and more attention than they're getting." Welch's report concluded that the combining of DoD nuclear forces with nonnuclear organizations has led to "markedly reduced levels of leadership whose daily focus is the nuclear enterprise and a general devaluation of the nuclear mission and those who perform the mission." Nevertheless, neither Welch's nor Peyer's reports found any failures with the security of United States nuclear weapons.

Responding to Welch's and Peyer's reports, USAF officials stated that they were already implementing many of the recommendations contained in the reports but added that existing regulations governing nuclear procedures were satisfactory. During his testimony before the senate committee, Darnell stated that "the Air Force portion of the nuclear deterrent is sound, and we will take every measure necessary to provide safe, secure, reliable nuclear surety to the American public."

=== Inspections, resignations, and further discipline ===
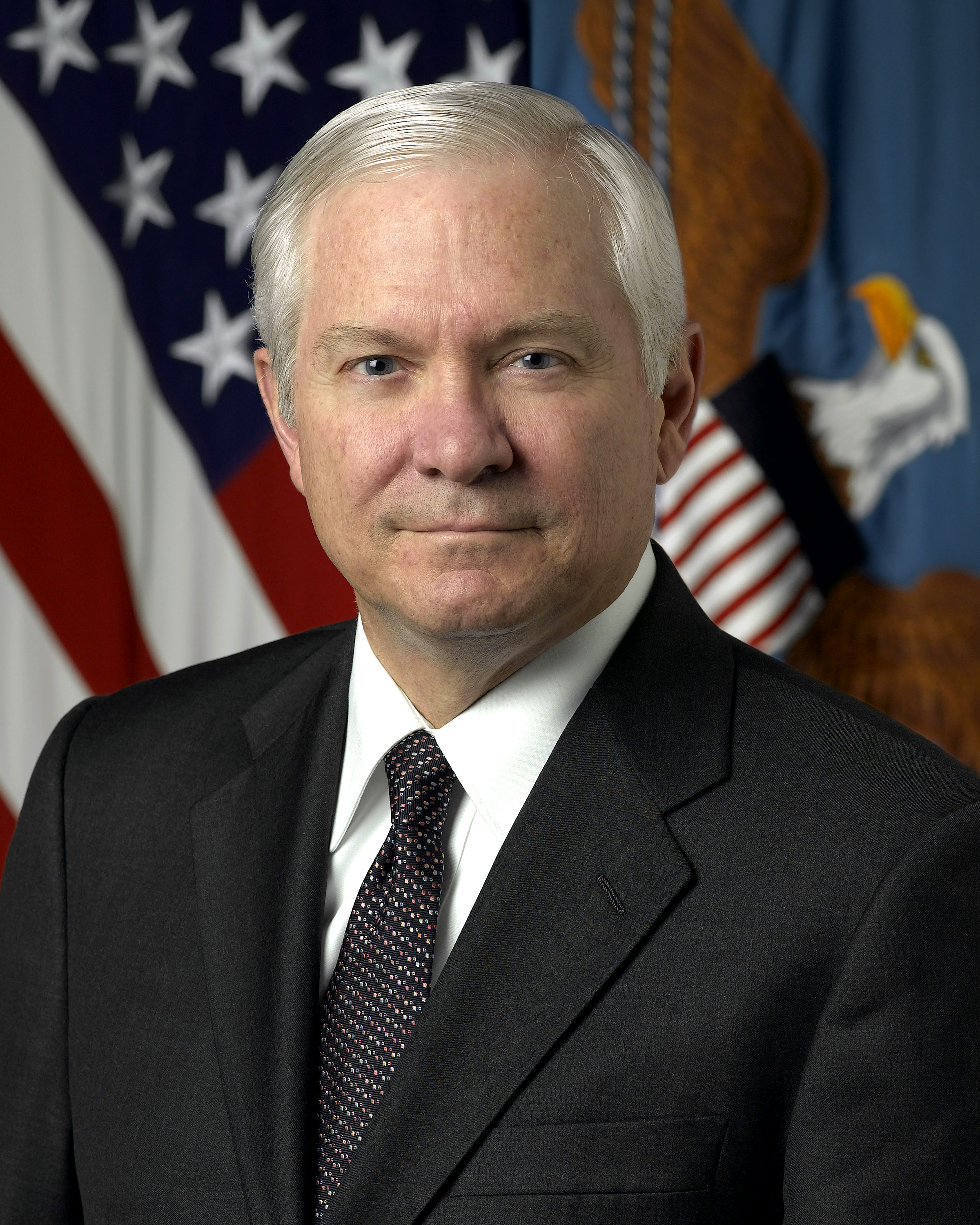
Robert Gates (2006)

Minot's full NSI took place beginning on 17 May 2008, and was conducted by inspectors from the Defense Threat Reduction Agency (DTRA) and the USAF's Air Combat Command (ACC). On 25 May, the DTRA issued the 5th Bomb Wing an "unsatisfactory" rating, the lowest rating possible, from the inspection. The 5th passed the inspection in nine of ten areas, but failed in the area of nuclear security. Following the inspection, Westa stated, "Overall, their assessment painted a picture of some things we need to work on in the areas of training and discipline". The 5th Bomb Wing Security Forces Squadron Commander, Lieutenant Colonel John Worley, was replaced by Lieutenant Colonel Stephen Weaver on 16 June 2008. In spite of failing the NSI, the wing kept its nuclear certification. Minot passed the follow-up inspection on 15 August 2008.

On 5 June 2008, Robert Gates announced the results of an investigation into the incorrect shipment in 2006 of four Mk 12 forward-section reentry vehicle assemblies to Taiwan. The investigation, conducted by Admiral Kirkland H. Donald, director of U.S. Naval Nuclear Propulsion, found that the Taiwan missile incident was, in Gates' words, "a degradation of the authority, standards of excellence and technical competence within the nation's ICBM force. Similar to the bomber-specific August 2007 Minot-Barksdale nuclear weapons transfer incident, this incident took place within the larger environment of declining Air Force nuclear mission focus and performance" and that "the investigation identified commonalities between the August 2007 Minot incident and this [the Taiwan] event." In his investigation report, Donald stated that the issues identified by his investigation were "indicative of an overall decline in Air Force nuclear weapons stewardship, a problem that has been identified but not effectively addressed for over a decade. Both the Minot-Barksdale nuclear weapons transfer incident and the Taiwan misshipment, while different in specifics, have a common origin: the gradual erosion of nuclear standards and a lack of effective oversight by Air Force leadership."

As a result of the investigation, Gates announced that "a substantial number of Air Force general officers and colonels have been identified as potentially subject to disciplinary measures, ranging from removal from command to letters of reprimand," and that he had accepted the resignations of Secretary of the Air Force Michael Wynne and USAF Chief of Staff T. Michael Moseley. Gates added that he had asked James R. Schlesinger to lead a senior-level task force to recommend improvements in the stewardship and operation of nuclear weapons, delivery vehicles and sensitive components by the Department of Defense. Members of the task force came from the Defense Policy Board and the Defense Science Board.

On 13 September 2008, Gates announced Schlesinger's task force's recommendations by calling on the USAF to place all nuclear weapons under a single command. The task force suggested that the new command be called Air Force Strategic Command, which would replace the current Air Force Space Command, and make it accountable for the nuclear mission. It also called for all USAF bombers to be placed under a single command. In addition, the task force recommended that the USAF move an additional 1,500 to 2,000 airmen into nuclear-related jobs. Gates announced that acting Air Force Secretary Michael B. Donley and Chief of Staff General Norton A. Schwartz were "reviewing the recommendations" for disciplinary action against USAF officers previously involved in the nuclear mission. The task force found an "unambiguous, dramatic and unacceptable decline in the Air Force's commitment to perform the nuclear mission and, until very recently, little has been done to reverse it."

On 25 September 2008, the United States Department of Defense announced that six Air Force generals, two Army generals, and nine colonels had received letters of reprimand, admonishment, or counseling. Two Air Force major generals were asked to stay in their current position and the others either retired, planned to retire, or were removed from their position. Air Force Chief of Staff Norton Schwartz met with each officer personally before issuing the letters. He noted that they had committed no offense under the UCMJ, but "did not do enough to carry out their leadership responsibilities for nuclear oversight" and "for that they must be held accountable." The Air Force stated that the discipline was in response to the mistaken shipment of nuclear fuzes to Taiwan, not for the Minot nuclear weapons incident.

The Air Force generals who were disciplined were:

- Lt. Gen. Kevin J. Sullivan, Air Force Deputy Chief of Staff for Logistics, Installations and Mission Support at the Pentagon. Sullivan was demoted and retired at the rank of major general in November 2008.
- Lt. Gen. Michael A. Hamel, who was commander of the Space and Missile Systems Center. He received a letter of admonishment and was allowed to retire in November 2008.
- Maj. Gen. Roger W. Burg, commander of 20th Air Force, who received a letter of admonishment. He was allowed to remain in his position to correct problems.
- Maj. Gen. Kathleen D. Close, commander of the Ogden Air Logistics Center. She received a letter of admonishment and was allowed to stay on.
- Brig. Gen. Francis M. Bruno, director of logistics for Air Force Materiel Command. He received a letter of admonishment and was allowed to retire.
- Brig. Gen. Arthur B. Cameron III, was commander of the 309th Maintenance Wing. He received a letter of admonishment and was reassigned.

The Army generals were:

- Brig. Gen. Lynn A. Collyar, who commanded the Defense Distribution Center from August 2006 to June 2008. He was allowed to stay in his position.
- Brig. Gen. Michael J. Lally III, who commanded the center from August 2004 to August 2006.

In addition, five colonels received letters of reprimand, including two who were removed from commands. Three other colonels received letters of admonishment, and one colonel received a letter of counseling.

In November 2008, the 341st Missile Wing at Malmstrom Air Force Base failed its nuclear surety inspection. The 90th Missile Wing at F. E. Warren Air Force Base failed its nuclear surety inspection one month later. In November 2009 at Kirtland Air Force Base the 377th Air Base Wing, commanded by Colonel Michael S. Duvall, and 498th Nuclear Systems Wing, commanded by Colonel Richard M. Stuckey, failed their nuclear surety inspections.

On 30 October 2009, Westa was relieved as commander of the 5th Bomb Wing by Major General Floyd L. Carpenter, commander of 8th Air Force under "perfection is the standard" philosophy. Carpenter stated that Westa was relieved for his "inability to foster a culture of excellence, a lack of focus on the strategic mission, and substandard performance during several nuclear surety inspections, including the newly activated 69th Bomb Squadron."

On 8 January 2009, Schlesinger's task force released its report regarding the overall DoD's management of the country's nuclear weapons mission. The report criticized the DoD for a lack of focus and oversight on its nuclear weapons programs and recommended that the DoD create a new assistant secretary position to oversee its nuclear management. The task force found that within the DoD only the United States Navy was effectively managing its nuclear arsenal. The panel stated that it found "a distressing degree of inattention to the role of nuclear weapons in deterrence among many senior DoD military and civilian leaders."

=== New command ===
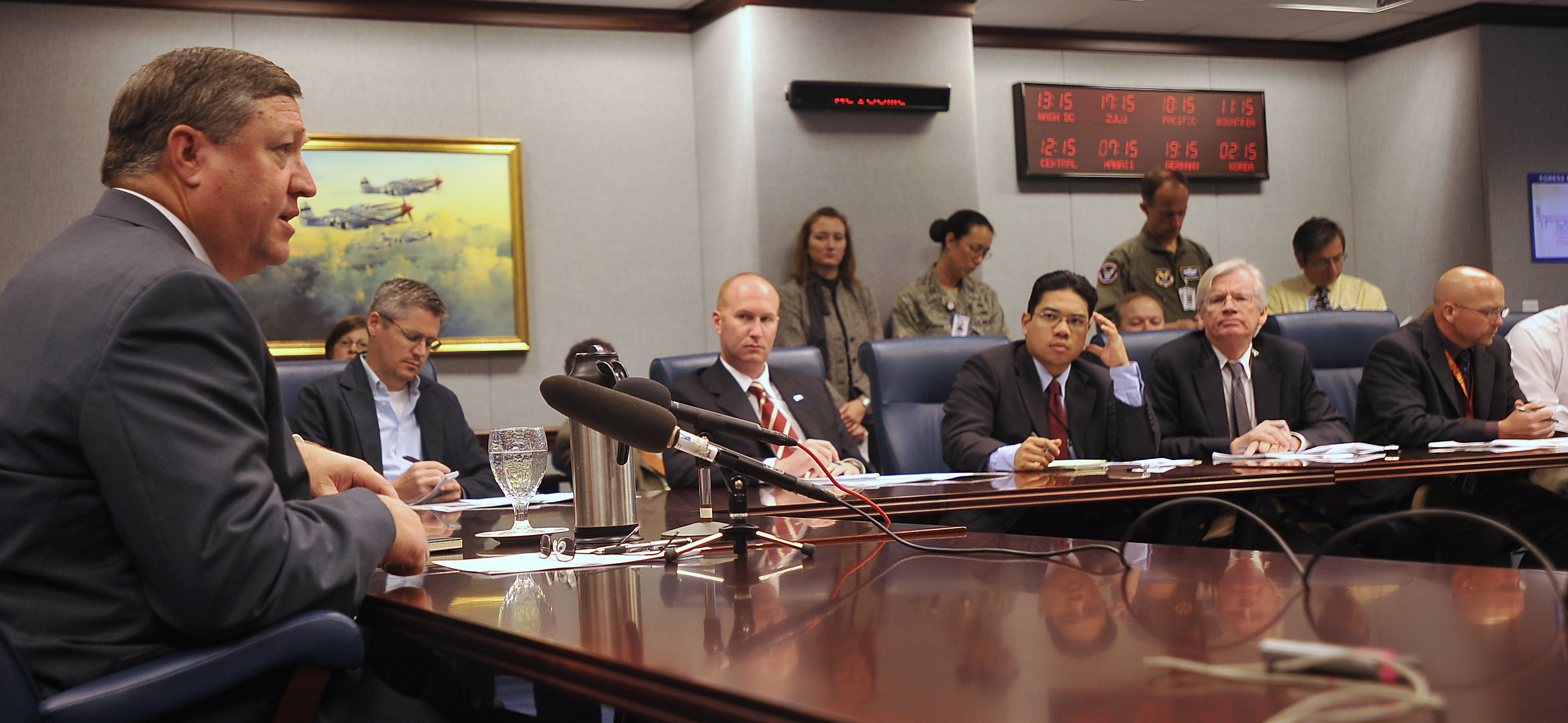
USAF Secretary Michael Donley discusses the creation of the Global Strike Command with media representatives at the Pentagon on 24 October 2008.

On 24 October 2008, new USAF Secretary Michael Donley announced the creation of Air Force Global Strike Command, which became operational on 7 August 2009. The USAF's intercontinental nuclear missile force was moved from Air Force Space Command to the new command. Barksdale Air Force Base was selected as the location of the new command's headquarters. Lieutenant General Frank Klotz became the first commander of the major command, which controls all USAF nuclear-capable bombers, missiles, and personnel.

== See also ==
- Permissive Action Link
