= Gouré (surname) =

Gouré is a surname. Notable people with the surname include:

- Ashley Goure (born 1990), Canadian sledge hockey player
- Dan Gouré, American academic
- Fernand Gouré (born 2002), Ivorian footballer
- Leon Gouré (1922–2007), Soviet Union-born American political scientist
