= Gainey =

Gainey is a surname. Notable people with the surname include:

- Anna Gainey (born 1978), Canadian politician
- Bob Gainey (born 1953), Canadian ice hockey player
- Ed Gainey (born 1970), American politician
- Ed Gainey (Canadian football) (born 1990), American gridiron football player
- Edward Gainey (born 1956), American politician
- Justin Gainey (born 1977), American basketball coach
- Kathleen M. Gainey, American army general
- M. C. Gainey (born 1948), American actor
- Richard Gainey (1890–1975), Australian politician
- Sean Gainey, American army general
- Steve Gainey (born 1979), Canadian ice hockey player
- Tommy Gainey (born 1975), American golfer
- Ty Gainey (born 1960), American baseball player
- William Gainey (born 1956), American soldier
