= Michael Wynne =

American government official & business executive (born 1944)

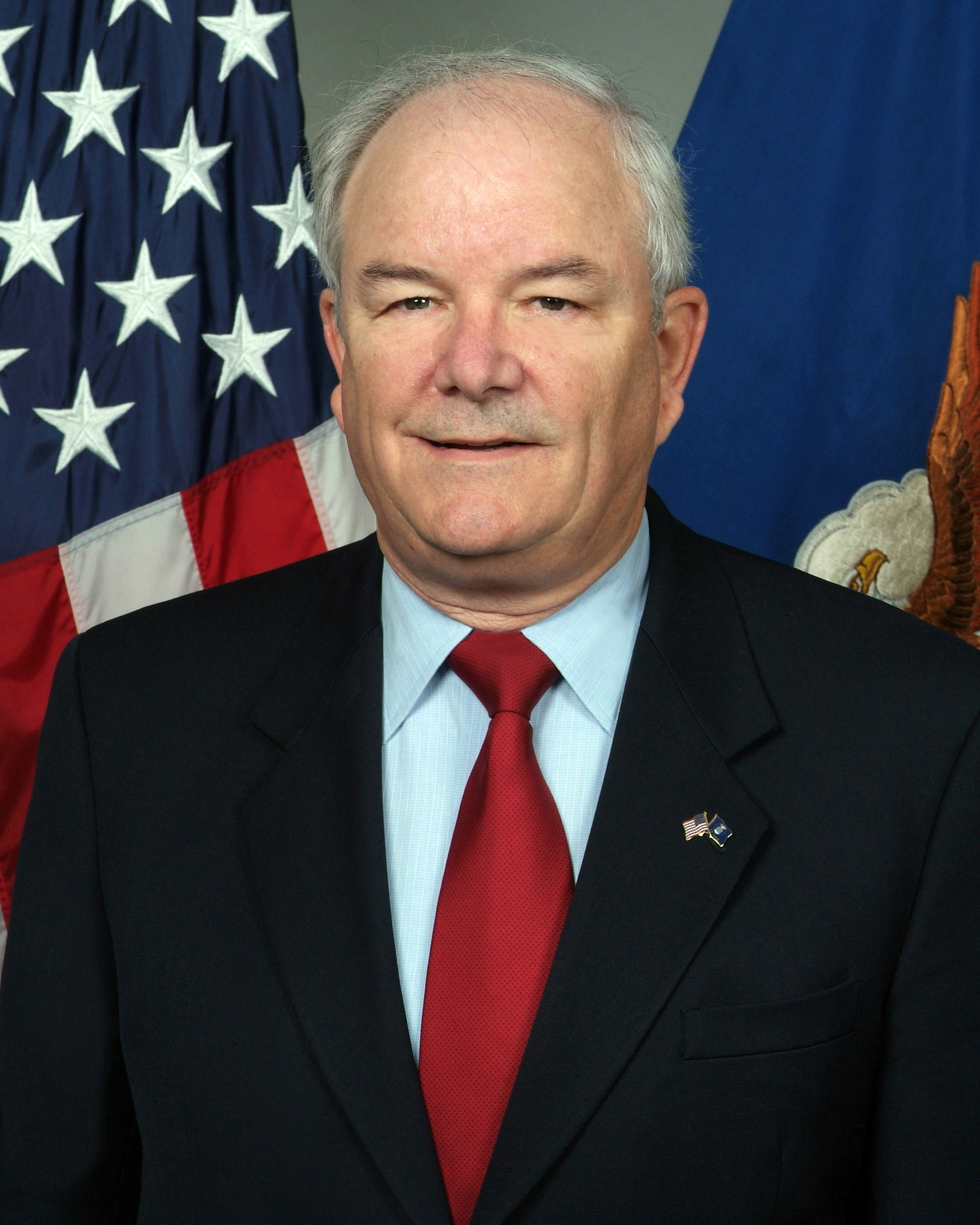

21st United States Secretary of the Air Force
- In office November 4, 2005 – June 5, 2008
- President: George W. Bush
- Preceded by: James G. Roche
- Succeeded by: Michael B. Donley

Personal details
- Born: September 4, 1944 (age 82) Clearwater, Florida, U.S.
- Died: Melbourne, Florida, U.S.
- Party: Republican
- Education: United States Military Academy (BS); Air University (MS); University of Colorado Colorado Springs (MBA)

Military service
- Allegiance: United States
- Branch/service: United States Air Force
- Years of service: 1966–1973
- Rank: Captain

Michael Walter Wynne (born September 4, 1944, died October 17, 2026) was an American politician and business executive and was the 21st United States Secretary of the Air Force. Secretary of Defense Robert Gates asked for and received his resignation (and that of Chief of Staff T. Michael Moseley) on June 5, 2008, in the wake of the 2007 United States Air Force nuclear weapons incident and the mistaken shipment of Minuteman III parts to Taiwan in 2006, followed by an investigation by and a critical report from Admiral Kirkland H. Donald regarding the Minuteman incident.

Michael B. Donley, Department of Defense Director of Administration and Management, was nominated to replace Wynne by President George W. Bush on June 9, 2008.

== Early life and family ==
Wynne was born in Clearwater, Florida, and raised in Melbourne, Florida.

He is the younger brother of 1st Lt. Patrick Edward Wynne, call sign "Ozark", MIA August 8, 1966, in Vietnam, declared dead in 1974, Socialist Republic of Vietnam returned remains to Joint POW/MIA Accounting Command March 18, 1977.

== Military and business career ==
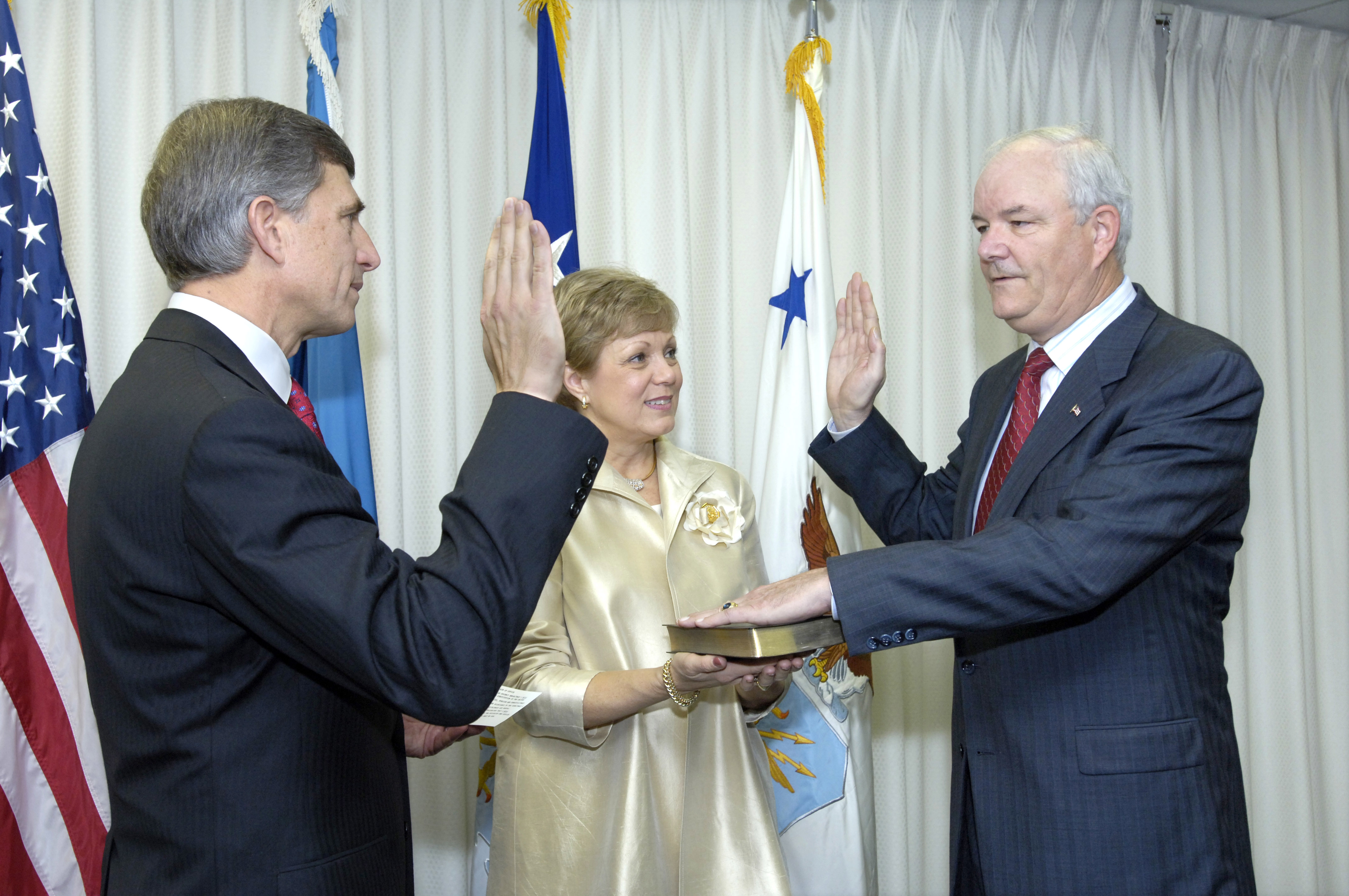
Michael W. Wynne takes the oath of office as the 21st Secretary of the Air Force.

Wynne graduated with the United States Military Academy class of 1966 and served in the Air Force for seven years, ending his career as a captain and assistant professor of astronautics at the United States Air Force Academy.

In 1999 Wynne had retired as senior vice president from General Dynamics, where his role was in International Development and Strategy. He had rejoined the company at the invitation of the chairman to strengthen international activities. In between working with General Dynamics, he spent three years with Lockheed Martin, having sold the General Dynamics' Space Systems Division to then Martin Marietta. He successfully integrated the division into the Astronautics Company and became the general manager of the Space Launch Systems segment, combining the Titan with the Atlas Launch vehicles. Wynne spent a total of 23 years with General Dynamics in various senior positions with the Aircraft (F-16s) and Main Battle Tanks (M1A2) Divisions, and served on the corporate staff prior to becoming the president of Space Systems, including Launch Vehicles (Atlas and Centaur), and a corporate vice president.

Prior to joining the Bush Administration, Wynne was involved in venture capital. He nurtured small technology companies through their startup phase as a member of the NextGenFund Executive Committee, and served in executive positions of two of those companies.

== Government service ==
In July 2001, Wynne was confirmed as Principal Deputy Under Secretary of Defense for Acquisition, Technology and Logistics, and in May 2003 he was appointed as acting Under Secretary of Defense for Acquisition, Technology and Logistics.

In this role, Wynne was the principal staff assistant and adviser to the Secretary and Deputy Secretary of Defense for all matters relating to the Department of Defense Acquisition System, research and development, advanced technology, developmental test and evaluation, production, logistics, installation management, military construction, procurement, environmental security, and nuclear, chemical and biological matters.

As Secretary of the Air Force he was responsible for the affairs of the Department of the Air Force, including the organizing, training, equipping and providing for the welfare of its nearly 370,000 men and women on active duty, 180,000 members of the Air National Guard and the Air Force Reserve, 160,000 civilians, and their families.

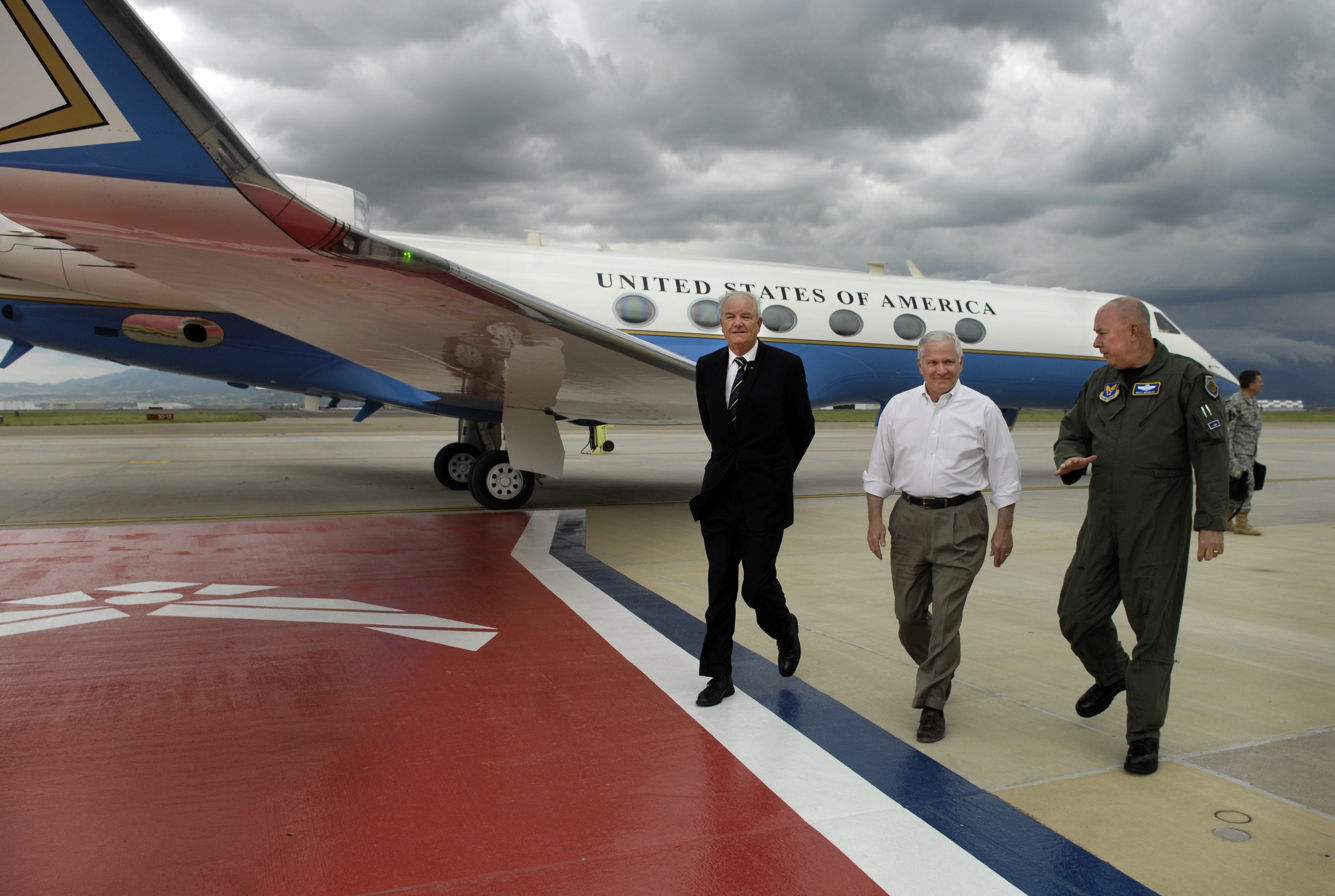
Secretary of the Air Force Michael W. Wynne with Secretary of Defense Robert M. Gates and Air Force Chief of Staff General T. Michael Moseley at Peterson Air Force Base, Colorado May 30, 2007.

=== Renewable energy ===
Wynne is a prominent proponent of renewable energy, and supported the Air Force's continued leadership in clean energy procurement. In an Air Force brochure on the topic, Wynne wrote:

The reliance on imported oil continues to threaten the economic, financial and physical security of the nation while the use of domestic fossil fuels contributes to nationwide pollution problems. The Air Force believes that development of renewable energy sources for facility energy is one important element of our comprehensive strategy.

The USAF is the nation's 16th leading user of electricity from renewables.

=== Non-lethal weapons ===
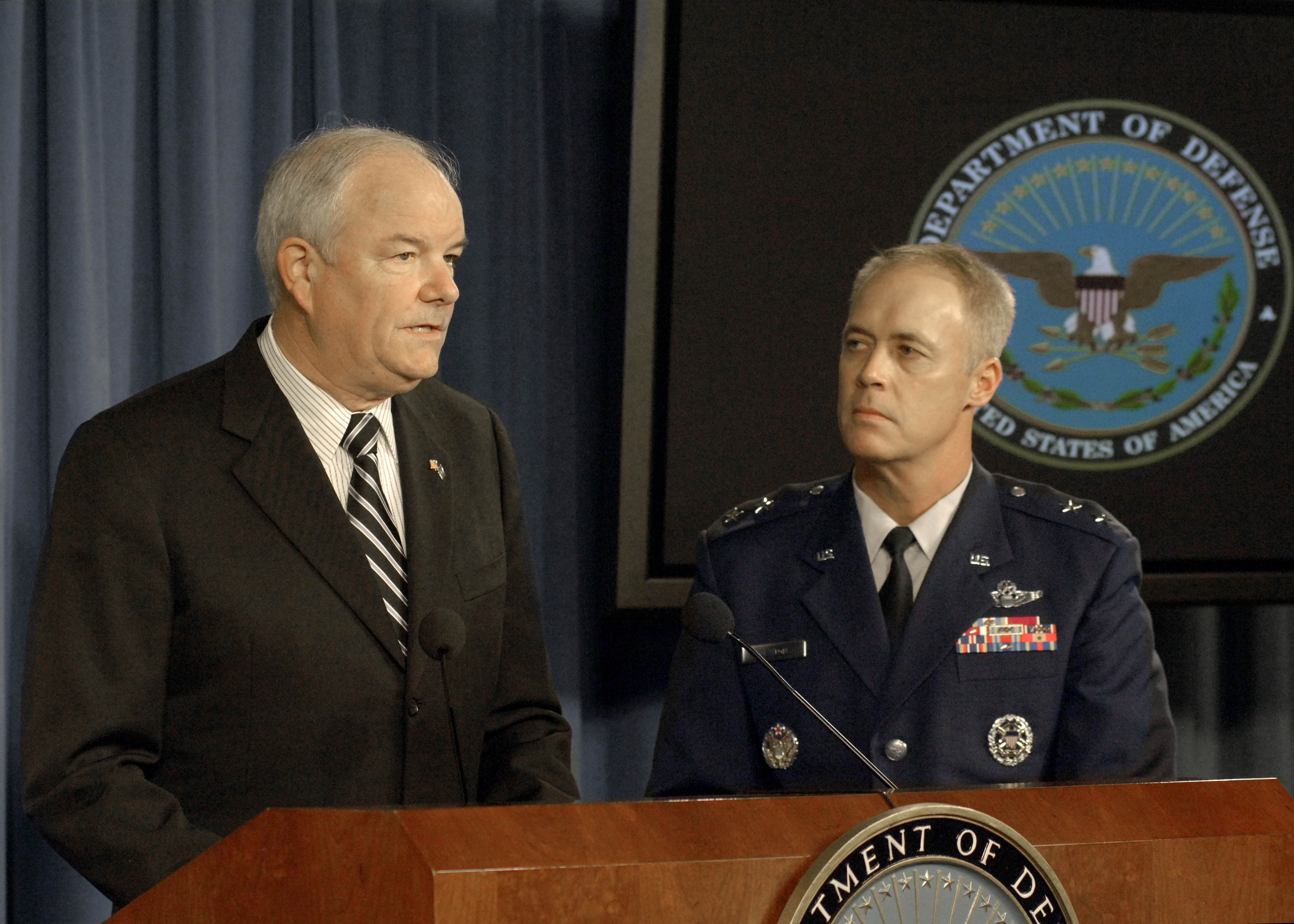
Wynne during a press conference in The Pentagon on October 19, 2007.

Wynne advocated testing nonlethal weapons, such as high-power microwave devices, against American citizens before being used on the battlefield, saying "If we're not willing to use it here against our fellow citizens, then we should not be willing to use it in a wartime situation [because] if I hit somebody with a nonlethal weapon and they claim that it injured them in a way that was not intended, I think that I would be vilified in the world press."

=== Resignation from the Department of the Air Force ===
On June 5, 2008, Robert Gates announced that he had accepted the resignation of Michael Wynne as Secretary of the Air Force because of "a decline in the Air Force's nuclear mission focus and performance" and "lack of a critical self-assessment culture". Gates specifically cited two incidents in which the Air Force had lost track of nuclear weapons or parts; in one incident, nuclear weapons fuses had been mistakenly sent to Taiwan when helicopter batteries had been ordered, and in the other, the 2007 United States Air Force nuclear weapons incident, a B-52 bomber had been flown across the country armed with six nuclear-armed cruise missiles that no one realized were on board.

Wynne responded that the report on the event was colored by the cultural differences of the Navy admiral, Kirkland H. Donald, who prepared it.

=== Later service ===
In June 2020, President Donald Trump announced Wynne's appointment to the Board of Visitors of the United States Air Force Academy. Wynne was later asked by President Joe Biden to resign in September 2021.

== Writing ==
Wynne has published numerous professional journal articles relating to engineering, cost estimating and contracting.

Wynne has called on the United States to fund the development of both designs for the KC-X, a step that Dan Goure of the Lexington Institute says would add even more delay to the long overdue project.

== Education ==
- 1966: Bachelor of Science degree in engineering, United States Military Academy, West Point, New York
- 1970: Master of Science degree in electrical engineering, Air Force Institute of Technology of Air University, Wright-Patterson Air Force Base, Ohio
- 1975: Master of Business Administration degree, University of Colorado, Colorado Springs

== Career chronology ==
1. June 1966 – June 1973, Air Force officer
2. July 1973 – May 1975, principal, Research Analysis and Development (RAD), Inc.
3. July 1975 – May 1994, various executive positions with General Dynamics
4. June 1994 – March 1997, Lockheed Martin, Denver
5. July 1997 – October 1999, senior vice president, General Dynamics, Falls Church, Virginia
6. December 2000 – July 2001, chairman and chief executive officer, IXATA Group, McLean, Virginia
7. July 2001 – October 2005, Principal Deputy Under Secretary of Defense for Acquisition, Technology and Logistics, Washington, D.C. (May 2003 – April 2005, also served as acting Under Secretary of Defense for Acquisition, Technology and Logistics)
8. April 2005 – June 2005, Under Secretary of Defense for Acquisition, Technology and Logistics, Washington, D.C.
9. November 2005 – June 2008, Secretary of the Air Force, Washington, D.C.

Military offices
Preceded by Pete Geren (acting)	United States Secretary of the Air Force; 2005–2008	Succeeded by Michael B. Donley
