= Peyper =

Peyper is a surname. Notable people with the surname include:

- Brendan Peyper (born 1996), South African Afrikaans singer
- Jaco Peyper (born 1980), South African rugby referee

== See also ==
- Almut Lehmann, married name Almut Peyper (born 1953), German pair skater
- Pepper (name)
- Peyer
