= Kirkland H. Donald =

Retired U.S. Navy admiral (born 1953)

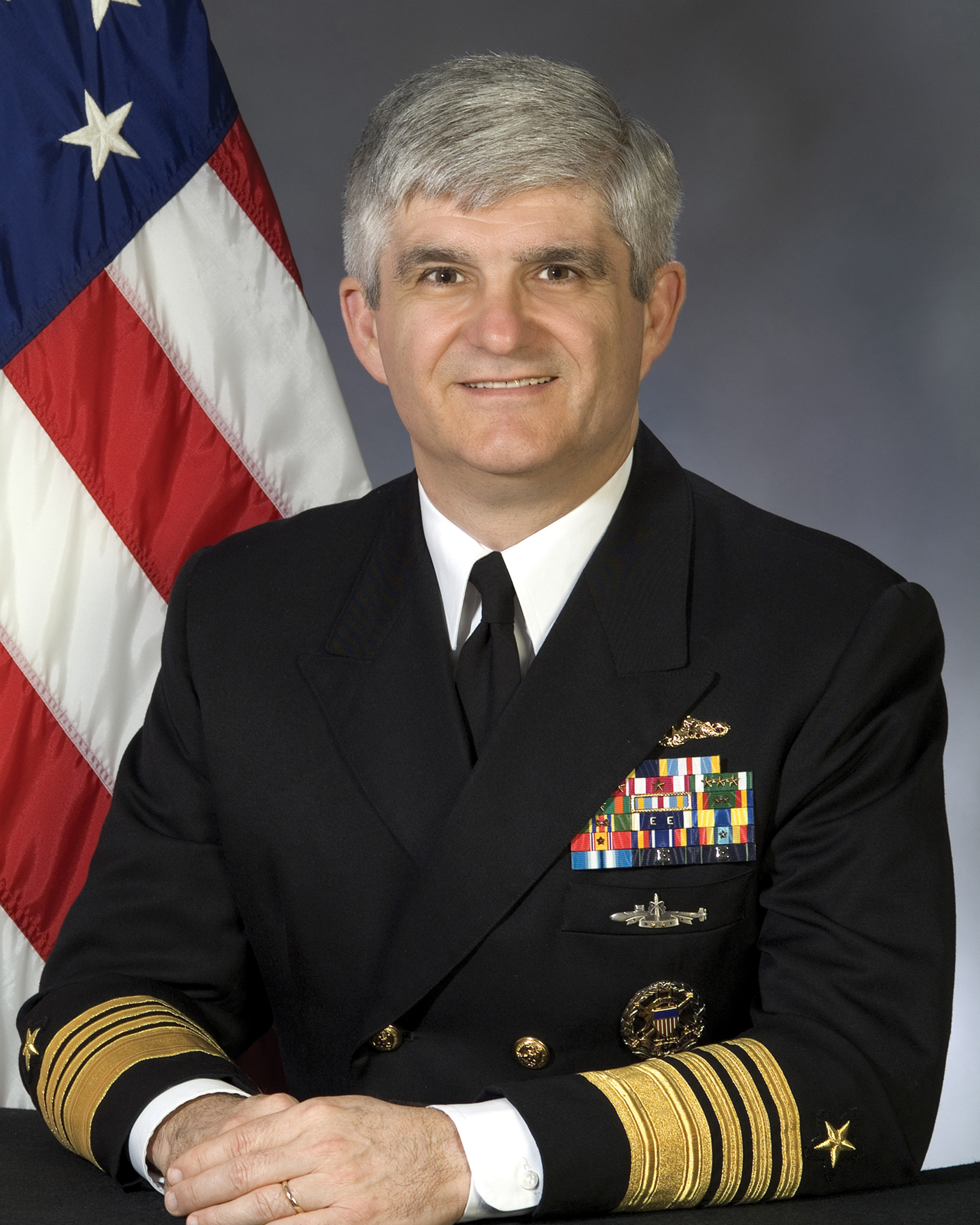
- Admiral Kirkland H. Donald
- Born: September 15, 1953 (age 73)
- Military career
- Allegiance: United States of America
- Branch: United States Navy
- Service years: 1975–2012
- Rank: Admiral
- Commands: Director, Naval Nuclear Propulsion; Deputy Administrator, NNSA's Naval Reactors COMSUBFOR; COMSUBGRU 8 COMSUBDEVRON 12 USS Key West (SSN-722)
- Awards: Navy Distinguished Service Medal (2); Defense Superior Service Medal; Legion of Merit (5); Commander of the Order of the British Empire (United Kingdom)

Kirkland Hogue "Kirk" Donald (born September 15, 1953) is a retired Admiral in the United States Navy, who in his last assignment served as the dual-hatted position of Director of Naval Nuclear Propulsion and Deputy Administrator of the National Nuclear Security Administration. Donald previously served as Commander, Submarine Force, U.S. Atlantic Fleet, and Commander, Submarine Allied Command, Atlantic. He retired from active duty on November 2, 2012.

== Education ==
Originally from Norlina, North Carolina, Donald graduated from the United States Naval Academy in 1975 with a Bachelor of Science in ocean engineering. He also holds an MBA from the University of Phoenix and is a graduate of Harvard University’s John F. Kennedy School of Government Senior Executive Fellows Program.

== Navy career ==
After completing his initial nuclear power and submarine training, Donald served on the USS Batfish (SSN-681), USS Mariano G. Vallejo (SSBN-658), and USS Seahorse (SSN-669).

Donald was Commanding Officer of the USS Key West (SSN-722), from October 1990 to February 1993. He served as Commander, Submarine Development Squadron Twelve from August 1995 to July 1997. From June 2002 to July 2003, he was assigned as Commander, Submarine Group Eight; Commander, Submarine Force Sixth Fleet (CTF 69); Commander, Submarines Allied Naval Forces South; and Commander, Fleet Ballistic Missile Submarine Force (CTF 164) in Naples, Italy. Most recently, he served as Commander, Naval Submarine Forces; Commander, Submarine Force, U.S. Atlantic Fleet; Commander, Allied Submarine Command, Atlantic; and Commander, Task Forces 84 and 144 in Norfolk, Virginia.

His shore assignments include the Pacific Fleet Nuclear Propulsion Examining Board and on the staff of the Director of Naval Nuclear Propulsion. He also served at the Bureau of Naval Personnel (BUPERS), on the Joint Staff, and as Deputy Chief of Staff for C4I, Resources, Requirements and Assessments for the U.S. Pacific Fleet.

Admiral Donald began his tenure as Director of the Naval Nuclear Propulsion Program, on 5 November 2004—a unique eight-year posting which was originally created and served in by Admiral Hyman G. Rickover. The appointment as Director is both a military and civilian position as it is the head of both the Naval Nuclear Propulsion Program in the Department of the Navy and the National Nuclear Security Administration in the Department of Energy. See Naval Reactors for more information.

As reported on March 25, 2008, Donald was assigned by Secretary of Defense Robert Gates to investigate the 2007 United States Air Force nuclear weapons incident where nuclear missile fuses were mistakenly sent to the island of Taiwan. Gates, when accepting the resignations of both Secretary of the Air Force Michael W. Wynne and Chief of Staff of the Air Force General T. Michael Moseley on June 5, 2008, cited the report's findings of a "decline in the Air Force's nuclear mission focus and performance" and a "lack of a critical self-assessment culture" in the Air Force. However, specific details of Admiral Donald's report remain classified.

Admiral Donald was relieved as Director, Naval Nuclear Propulsion by Admiral John M. Richardson, on 3 November 2012.

== Civilian career ==
As of April 2022, Donald was chairman of Huntington Ingalls Industries, the largest military shipbuilding company in the United States. In mid-January 2024, shortly after the high-profile Alaska Airlines 1282 mid-air door plug incident on a Boeing 737 MAX, Boeing appointed Adm Donald as special advisor to help investigate its quality management practices.

== Awards and decorations ==
Donald's awards include:

Submarine Warfare insignia
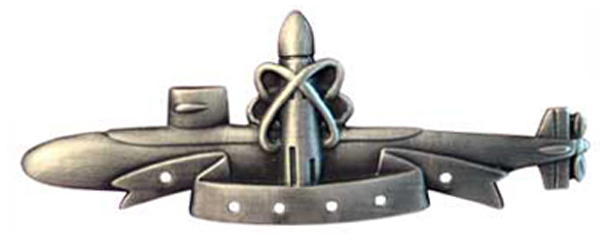
Silver SSBN Deterrent Patrol insignia with two gold stars
Office of the Joint Chiefs of Staff Identification Badge

Navy Distinguished Service Medal with 1 gold star
Defense Superior Service Medal
Legion of Merit with four gold stars
Meritorious Service Medal with one gold star
Navy and Marine Corps Commendation Medal with three gold stars
Navy and Marine Corps Achievement Medal with one gold star
Joint Meritorious Unit Award
Navy Unit Commendation with two bronze stars
Navy Meritorious Unit Commendation with two bronze stars
Battle "E" with 2 "E"s
Navy Expeditionary Medal
National Defense Service Medal with two bronze stars
Global War on Terrorism Medal
Sea Service Deployment Ribbon with silver service star
Navy Arctic Service Ribbon
Honorary Commander of the Order of the British Empire (United Kingdom)
Navy Expert Rifleman Medal
Navy Expert Pistol Medal
