= Tony Russo (whistleblower) =

American whistleblower (1936–2008)

- Born: Anthony J. Russo Jr. 14 October 1936; Suffolk, Virginia, U.S.
- Died: August 6, 2008 (aged 71); Suffolk, Virginia, U.S.
- Education: Virginia Tech; Princeton University
- Employer: RAND Corporation
- Known for: The Pentagon Papers

Anthony J. Russo Jr. (14 October 1936 – 6 August 2008) was an American researcher who assisted Daniel Ellsberg, his friend and former colleague at the RAND Corporation, in copying the Pentagon Papers. Russo was also the first person to document the systematic torture of Vietcong prisoners in Vietnam.

== Early life and education ==
Russo was born in Suffolk, Virginia. He graduated from Virginia Tech with a degree in aeronautical engineering in 1960, then worked on a NASA space capsule program. He continued his education at Princeton University, earning master's degrees in aeronautical engineering and in public affairs.

== Rand Corporation and Vietnam ==
He began working at the RAND Corporation as a researcher in late 1964 and was determined to go to South Vietnam to resolve his personal curiosity about the role of the Vietcong (VC) and the US opposition to them. In February 1965, he arrived in Saigon and began working on Rand's Viet Cong Motivation and Morale Project. Every three weeks, Russo and his team of three or four Vietnamese would travel to a provincial town where they would spend three or four days interviewing VC prisoners, defectors and South Vietnamese civilians. While in Saigon, he first met Daniel Ellsberg, whom he briefed extensively about the project.

By early 1966, Russo increasingly sympathised with the VC, who he felt had greater legitimacy than the corrupt South Vietnamese government. He also disagreed with the optimism of team leader Leon Gouré, who believed that increased US bombing would win the war. Russo and his colleague, Doug Scott, wrote to RAND management complaining of deficiencies in Gouré's leadership, data analysis and the project design; the letter was ignored. Russo would later claim that Gouré instituted an informal censorship policy to remove details of torture or mistreatment of VC prisoners and civilians by South Vietnamese forces from RAND reports.

Later in 1966, Russo undertook research into crop destruction aimed at denying food for the VC. The report was published in October 1967 and concluded that crop destruction was counterproductive, as it had only a marginal impact on the VC, but a high negative impact on the civilian population and should be discontinued.

By 1967, Russo was increasingly outspoken in his opposition to US involvement in the war and his sympathy towards the VC. In January 1968, he returned to the US rejoining the economics department of Rand. He renewed his acquaintance with Ellsberg and they frequently discussed Russo's experiences in Vietnam and his change from a supporter of US aims to supporting the VC in what he saw as a fight against injustice. Russo increasingly came into conflict with the head of economics, Charlie Wolf, who fired him in December 1968.

== Pentagon Papers and trial ==
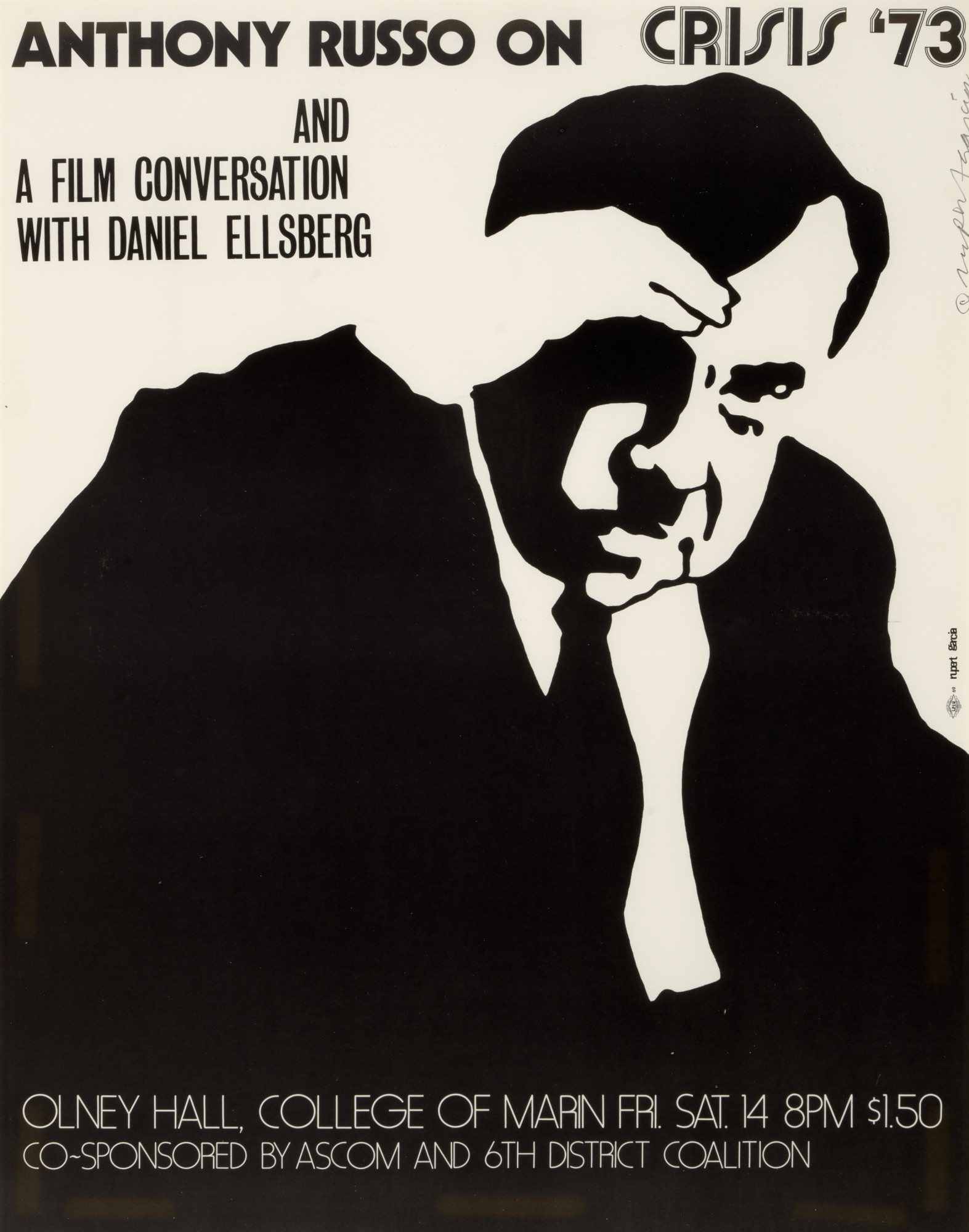
Poster by Rupert García for lecture on Crisis '73 in September 1973

Ellsberg and Russo remained friends and Ellsberg credits Russo with first planting the idea of leaking the Pentagon Papers. On 30 September 1969, Ellsberg approached Russo and asked for his help in locating a Xerox machine to copy the papers. Russo suggested that they could copy them at his girlfriend's ad agency; on 1 October 1969, Ellsberg removed the first set of papers from his office at RAND and he, Russo and Russo's girlfriend proceeded to copy them, a process that they would repeat over the following weeks.

On 22 June 1971, Russo was subpoenaed by the Federal Bureau of Investigation (FBI) to appear before a federal grand jury. Despite being granted immunity, he refused to testify to avoid giving incriminating information against Ellsberg. He served 47 days in jail for ignoring the subpoena. In December 1971, he was charged with conspiracy and three counts of theft and espionage, whilst Ellsberg was charged with 15 counts including conspiracy, espionage and theft of government property.

Russo and Ellsberg disagreed over their defense strategy, with Russo, who had become increasingly radicalised, wanting to turn the trial into a forum against the war and American imperialism, while Ellsberg, having achieved his aim of getting the papers into the public, wanted to mount a conventional defense to avoid prison. Ellsberg and his wife hired lawyers and controlled the defense, leaving Russo feeling "abandoned" and "betrayed".

Russo wrote two articles for Ramparts magazine about the Pentagon papers and his experience in Vietnam, one of which was titled The RAND papers.

On 11 May 1973, federal court judge William M. Byrne Jr. dismissed the case before it reached a jury, after the office of Ellsberg's psychiatrist had been burglarized and the FBI had lost records of what may have been illegally taped telephone conversations. Byrne was also offered the position of FBI director by John Ehrlichman during the trial.

The stress of the trial and Russo's belief that Ellsberg stole the limelight, while he was seen as "just a Xeroxer", ended their friendship.

== Death ==
Russo died of natural causes at his home in Suffolk, Virginia on 6 August 2008.

== See also ==
- Espionage Act of 1917
- New York Times Co. v. United States
- Phoenix program
