= Viet Cong Motivation and Morale Project =

Inquiry into the Vietnam War

The Viet Cong Motivation and Morale Project was a series of studies done by the American research institute RAND from late 1964 through the end of 1968. The project interviewed Viet Cong prisoners and defectors with the intention of better understanding the motivating factors and assessing morale of the insurgency during the Vietnam War. Over the course of the study, 2,371 interviews took place and over 60,000 pages of information were produced. Interpretations of the study's findings were contested by people both involved and uninvolved in the project.

== Background ==
RAND Corporation's involvement in the Vietnam war was part of a broad shift toward military and government contracting with private research organizations to meet international military objectives. This trend had begun by the end of World War II, which spawned the creation of RAND.^{1} As part of the ideological battles of the Cold War, military contracts for civilian-run research expanded beyond combat technology and strategy to social science, which was intended to provide cultural and social information about the people of communist-threatened countries.^{4}

Viet Cong Emblem

During the Vietnam War, Lyndon B. Johnson's stated objective was to fight not only a war of destruction but also of nation-building, which implicated the need for a long-term sociological understanding of the people he was fighting.^{156} In the conflict with the Viet Cong, US military intelligence as well as the South Vietnamese Army (SVA) had a difficult time infiltrating the Viet Cong using spies, making it difficult to understand both the intentions and attitudes of the insurgency.^{962} Other challenges to gaining intelligence included the power asymmetry between the US and SVA, the ambiguity of purpose, strategy, and even nature of the war, the fact that so many intelligence groups were working simultaneously and somewhat disjointedly, and the fact that the Viet Cong maintained both the intelligence and political-military initiative throughout the war.^{612}

The US objective was not only to destroy the Viet Cong, but also to replace the insurgency with a viable counter-insurgency organization, which would require a knowledge of the cultural, economic, and political forces that were attracting people to the Viet Cong in the first place.^{162} Because the military-university relationship was increasingly seen as a source of institutional conflict, private research organizations such as RAND corporation provided a more feasible alternative. During the Vietnam War, multiple social research organizations contracted with the Advanced Research Projects Agency (ARPA), including RAND.

In 1961, RAND faced budget constraints from the Air Force and turned to other clients for funding, resulting in a contract with ARPA that same year, which began its in-depth involvement in social research in Vietnam.^{12} By the end of the war, RAND produced hundreds of documents on Vietnam, Laos, and Thailand, but the largest single project undertaken was the Viet Cong Motivation and Morale Project, which was carried out in two phases from 1964 to 1967.^{v, vii}

== Major participants ==
=== John Donnell ===
John Donnell led the first phase of the project along with Joseph Zasloff. Donnell was a professor at Dartmouth College at the time he was hired by RAND. He had a doctorate in political science (his thesis was on politics in South Vietnam), and was fluent in Vietnamese and Chinese. He had spent extensive time in Asia, studying in South Vietnam, and working for the US army. During the project, he lived and worked at the villa with the Zasloffs and other staff.

=== Joseph Zasloff ===
Co-consultant for the first phase of the project, Joseph Zasloff was a political scientist. He had learned French in high school, and learned Vietnamese when he was assigned to a teaching position at the University of Saigon in 1959. RAND hired Zasloff after he published an article about his experience in Vietnam. Zasloff, Donnell, and Pauker co-authored the preliminary report for the project, published in 1964.

=== Leon Gouré ===
Leon Gouré led the second phase of the project from 1965 through 1967. He was an expert on the Soviet Union and worked in RAND's Social Science Department. Gouré was known for being a proponent of airpower as the best way to fight insurgency and interpreted the data collected during the project to support this idea.

=== Konrad Kellen ===
Konrad Kellen was a RAND analyst who had written many studies on Vietnam He was brought onto the project to give a second opinion on Goure's assertions. He strongly disagreed with Gouré's interpretation of the study's findings and advocated for U.S. withdrawal from Vietnam.

=== Vietnamese interviewers ===
The interviewers utilized for the project were all Vietnamese; with a few exceptions, the majority did not know English, instead translating the interviews into French. Most of the interviewers who participated in Phase I of the project, from 1964 through 1965, were recruited by Joseph Zasloff; many were colleagues of his at the University of Saigon.

Many of the interviewers in Phase I of the project left to return to their teaching positions. The second wave of interviewers, recruited by Gouré, came from many different backgrounds. Around 40 people worked as interviewers during the duration of the project, with about 10-15 interviewers on staff at any given time. Most of the interviewers were inexperienced and received training before they were permitted to conduct formal interviews.

=== Viet Cong prisoners of war and defectors ===
Respondents in the study were chosen from a pool of Viet Cong prisoners and defectors in Southern Vietnam. They were chosen based on their knowledge of particular subjects. People who had spent significant time with the political or military organization of the Viet Cong, or people with a good understanding of a particular area or population were considered most valuable to the project.

The respondents were mostly from peasant backgrounds and spoke informal Vietnamese. Many reported having been tortured during their time in captivity.

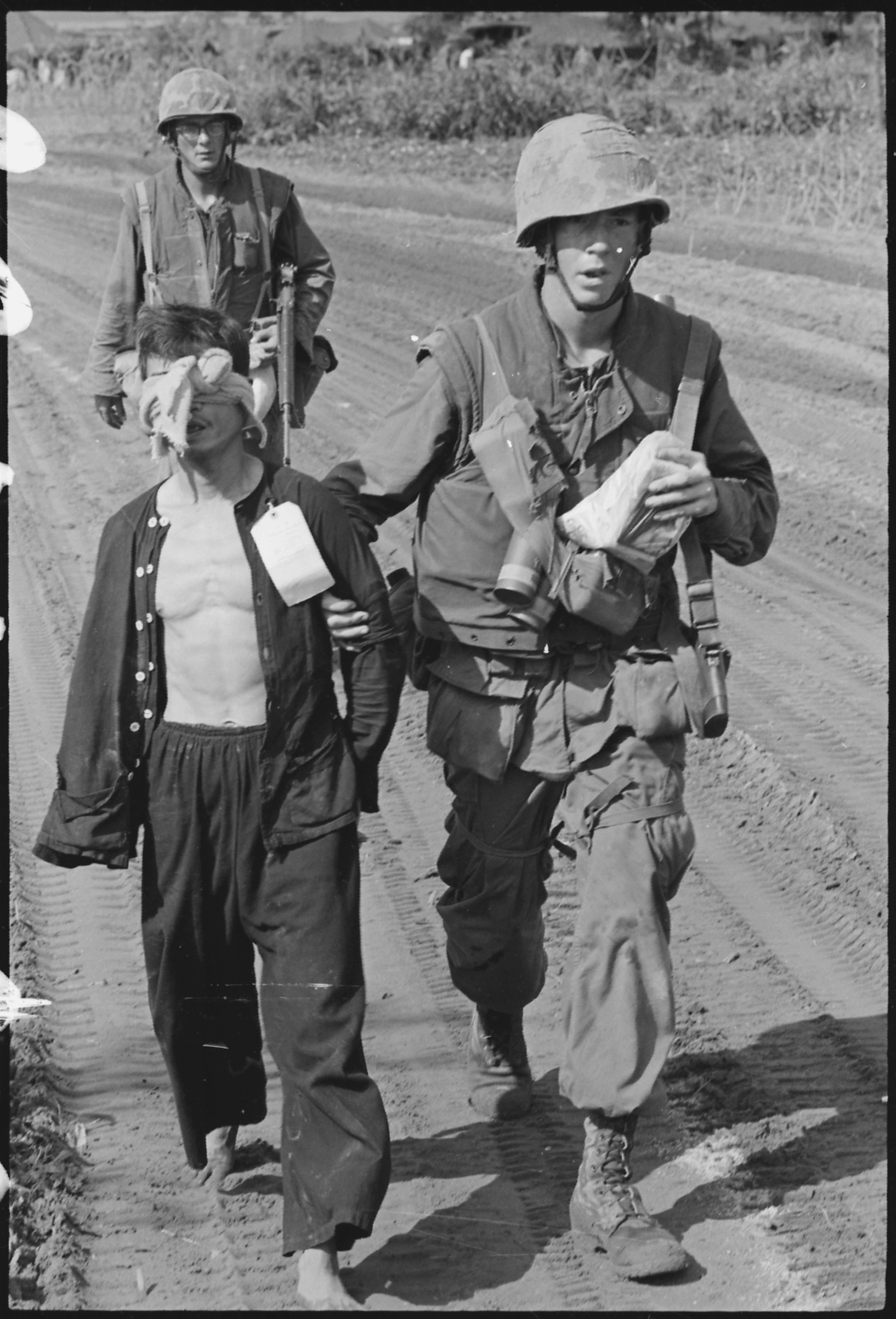
Viet Cong prisoner in 1966

== Methodology ==
=== Location ===
At the inception of the project, Zasloff decided to place the project headquarters in a large French villa in Saigon. The villa was to serve as living quarters and an office for the duration of the project. Interviews were conducted at around forty different locations throughout the project. In the first months they interviewed Viet Cong POWs in a CIA detention center in Saigon, then expanded to local holding centers throughout South Vietnam. The translation and typing up of the interviews usually occurred at the villa. Finished reports were sent to the RAND office in Santa Monica, California.

=== Interviews ===
The interviews were preferably conducted in an empty room, although privacy was not always assured. Interviews usually included just the respondent and the interviewer, although occasionally translators or interviewers in training would also be present. The interviews were recorded by tape recorder and the interviewer would take detailed notes. Respondents were not aware of the identity of the interviewers or the nature of the project although most of them knew that it was American sponsored. Interviewers worked to build a friendly and relaxed environment, offering cigarettes and coffee, and using formal, respectful pronouns when addressing the respondents.

=== Transcription and translation ===
After the interview, the interviewer would attempt to recreate the interview using their notes and the recording. The language used in transcription varied, due to the variability of interviewers' English fluency. Primary drafts were then given to translators if not in English. Drafted reports were sent to team leaders who made light edits, removing information deemed irrelevant, and typed up the final form.

=== Limitations ===
The project faced heavy criticism due to the limitations and flaws in its methodology. Limitations included the possibility that defectors might say what they thought interviewers want to hear, calling into question the reliability of the information gathered. The sample of individuals could not be randomized because they only had access to captured or defected Viet Cong soldiers. Some accused the questionnaires of being biased because they were written with the intention of acquiring specific types of information.

The system for finalizing reports had lots of opportunities for error. Many interviewers did not know English and translated interviews into French, which were then translated into English, increasing the risk of translation errors.

By 1967, criticisms of the project's methodology were increasingly prevalent, with claims that there was not enough structure to the analysis and questionnaire, allowing results to be skewed according to Gouré's personal inclinations.

== Project phases and findings ==
=== Phase I ===
==== 1964 ====
The first set of findings were published in the 1964 Report entitled Viet Cong Motivation and Morale in 1964: A Preliminary Report. In this report, Zasloff and Donnell concluded that the Viet Cong was composed of participants with widely varying levels of commitment and engagement. The most dedicated members of the insurgency were usually Viet Minh who had remained undetected in the South or returned there after 1959. For these most dedicated members, the fight was a nationalist one aimed at the betterment of Vietnamese society. For younger members, reasons for joining were more diverse, including frustration with economic opportunities, social injustice, combating a government they saw as being run by the rich, seeking interesting personal experiences, or fighting against American imperialism. During their service, these men were strengthened by Kiem Thao, which were sessions aimed at building motivation and morale.^{70-71}

The 1964 findings came at time when Viet Cong were demonstrating significant prowess against US forces, and the RAND reports gave a sense that the Viet Cong were stronger and more committed than many American leaders had previously thought.^{73} The fact that the report portrayed the Viet Cong as "peasant nationalists" fighting a power they saw as being oppressive troubled some American leaders because it challenged Americans' assumed moral upper-hand. In addition, the strength and commitment of the Viet Cong's organization convinced some leaders that it would be incredibly costly to defeat them, if it were possible at all. Despite these findings, Pentagon leaders were simultaneously coming to feel that pulling out of the war would damage American credibility internationally, and in 1964 and 1965 President Johnson took action to escalate US involvement in the war.^{74}

==== 1965 ====
In 1965, a report authored by Zasloff, Pauker, and Donnel suggested that a strategy of attrition could possibly weaken Viet Cong morale and help the United States win the war, which also contributed to the escalation and prolonged bombing operations in Vietnam.^{90} Gouré was the loudest proponent of air-operations, despite a 1965 RAND report written by Zasloff, Donnel, and Pauker, suggesting that the air-war contributed to anti-US hatred, inflicted more damage on civilians than on Viet Cong combatants, and provided an opportunity for the Viet Cong to regain trust of the population by providing support in the aftermath of US damages.^{94-95} Gouré published a report in the same year arguing the opposite of his colleagues, that continued pressure from the air would weaken the Viet Cong.^{96, 118}

=== Phase II ===
The second phase of the project entailed a transition in leadership from Zasloff, Pauker, and Donnel to Gouré. A second report was published in 1965 based on interviews completed that year. By this point, US involvement in Vietnam had transitioned more to direct conflict, and the first report had been criticized for being too abstract to be usable in a military context. Consequently, this report focused on potentially exploitable vulnerabilities within the Viet Cong and potential actions to take advantage of them. The list of vulnerabilities focused on growing divisions between the older and younger members of the Viet Cong, losing power in the countryside, and general failure of the VC to make significant gains leading to poor morale.

In 1965, Gouré's takeover of the project coupled with his belief that stronger US military involvement would erode the Viet Cong led to military leaders ramping up the air war and performing crop destruction operations to try to starve out the Viet Cong.^{133}

==== 1966 ====
By this point, Gouré was running an expanded project with much more funding than had been granted in 1964, and the war was escalating rapidly, which brought RAND into controversy for contributing to the escalation. Gouré and his team published a report that supported Gouré's views about escalation, that US military involvement did not cause resentment among civilians and that airpower was continuing to erode Viet Cong morale, though not to the degree desired since supplies and military support from the north had not been stopped.^{156-157} Gouré also produced an informal note that bolstered military leaders with optimism about the efficacy of the air war, claiming that morale was being severely depleted.^{160}

===== Controversy over Gouré =====
During this year, RAND participants such as Doug Scott, Tony Russo and Russ Betts felt that Gouré was selecting data for reporting that aligned with his own views about the war, and that the interview responses were so diverse that they could be used to argue anything.^{165} Despite this growing controversy, Gouré's influence helped bolster Johnson's and other military leaders' optimism about the prospects of the war.

==== 1967 ====
In response to criticisms about his research designs, Gouré published a report on the project in January 1967 acknowledging design flaws and limitations to the representativeness of his interviewee sample.^{186} This report also included a discussion of vulnerabilities as well as strengths of the Viet Cong.

In April, Gouré was removed from leadership in the project and American military progress was stalling, so the project was nearly shut down.^{201} In fall of that year, Gouré was put back on the project and continued it with a focus on interviewing Viet Cong prisoners who had infiltrated South Vietnam through neighboring countries.^{209} During this phase, the project also focused on the efficacy of crop-destruction, how US bombing affected civilian attitudes toward the US, and if the Viet Cong was really declining in response to the air war.^{223} They found that crop destruction was not effective and harmed civilians to a greater degree than the enemy.^{225} Kellen and others began to increasingly interpret the interviews with a focus on the elements that had allowed the Viet Cong to maintain cohesion and keep fighting through the war, in contrast to Gouré's claims that they were declining.^{231} In fact, Kellen thought that increased pressure on the Viet Cong led to growing resolve among their ranks.^{232}

== Legacy ==
Even during the lifetime of the project, Gouré, Kellen, and other participants drew dramatically different conclusions from its findings. RAND's and other extra-governmental organizations' involvement in the war effort has attracted criticism for creating ideological echo-chambers that re-affirm the military's preexisting goals. Others have argued that, in support of Konrad's conclusions about the project, the US lost the war due to the resilience of the Viet Cong. The project has also been criticized for its interview structure being built upon American philosophical assumptions, patterns of othering, coercion, and an overall goal to help the military defeat the Viet Cong, not just understand them.
