= Peyer =

Peyer is a surname which may refer to:

- Craig Peyer (born 1950), former California Highway Patrol officer convicted of murdering Cara Knott
- Gervase de Peyer (1926–2017), English clarinettist and conductor
- Johann Baptist Peyer (c.1678–1733), Austrian organist and composer
- Johann Conrad Peyer (1653–1712), Swiss anatomist
- Károly Peyer (1881–1956), Hungarian politician
- Polly Peyer, retired U.S. Air Force general
- Tom Peyer (born 1954), American comic book creator and editor

== See also ==
- Peyer's patches, aggregated lymphoid nodules named after Johann Conrad Peyer
