= Kathleen M. Gainey =

United States Army general

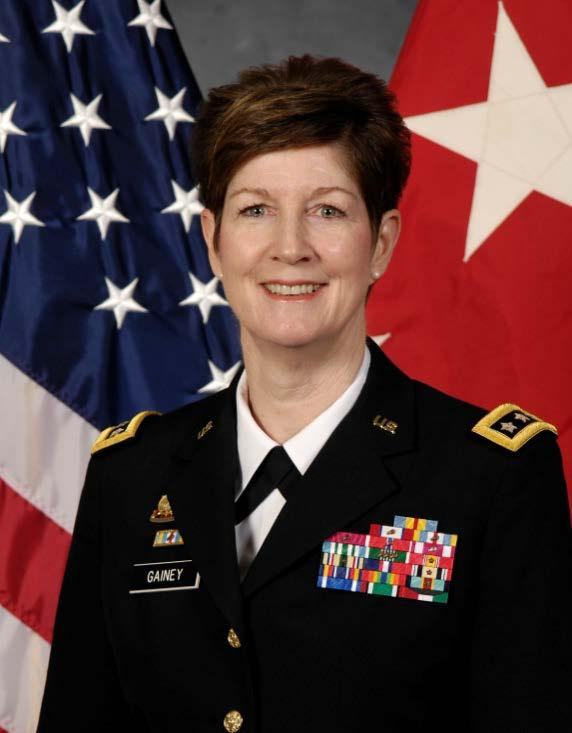
- Lieutenant General Kathleen M. Gainey
- Military career
- Allegiance: United States
- Branch: United States Army
- Service years: 1978–2013
- Rank: Lieutenant General
- Commands: Surface Deployment and Distribution Command; Defense Distribution Center; 7th Corps Support Group; 6th Transportation Battalion; 5th Heavy Boat Company
- Conflicts: Gulf War; Iraq War
- Awards: Defense Distinguished Service Medal; Army Distinguished Service Medal (2); Defense Superior Service Medal (2); Legion of Merit (2); Bronze Star Medal (2)

Lieutenant General Kathleen M. Gainey is a retired United States Army general who served as Deputy Commander, United States Transportation Command at Scott Air Force Base, Illinois. She retired in 2013.

== Education ==
- 1978 Bachelor of Science Degree in Special Education, Old Dominion University, VA
- 1987 Master of Business Administration in Contract Management and Procurement, Babson College, MA.
- 1989 Army Command and General Staff College, Fort Leavenworth, KS.
- 1997 Graduate, Army War College, Carlisle Barracks, PA.

== Military career ==
Gainey received her commission as a second lieutenant through ROTC in 1978. Her commands include:

- 5th Heavy Boat Company, Ford Island, Hawaii
- 6th Transportation Battalion, Fort Eustis, Virginia
- 7th Corps Support Group, Warner Barracks in Bamberg, Germany
- Defense Distribution Center, New Cumberland, Pennsylvania
- Commanding General, Surface Deployment and Distribution Command, headquartered at Scott Air Force Base, Illinois

Gainey's other assignments include

- Chief, Container Freight Branch, Military Ocean Terminal Bay Area, MTMC Western Area, Oakland, California
- Program Analyst, US Army Armament, Munitions and Chemical Command, Rock Island, Illinois
- Executive Officer, 2d Area Support Group, 22d Support Command
- S-2/S3, 702d Transportation Battalion, Saudi Arabia
- Division Transportation Officer, 24th Infantry Division (Mechanized), Fort Stewart, Georgia
- Special Assistant to the Chief of Staff, Army, Washington, D.C.
- Chief Joint Operations Division, United States Transportation Command, Scott Air Force Base, Illinois
- Director, Force Projection and Distribution, Office of the Deputy Chief of Staff, G-4, Washington, D.C.
- Deputy Chief of Staff, Resources and Sustainment, Multi-National Force-Iraq, Operation Iraqi Freedom.
- Director of Logistics, Joint Staff J4

Military offices
Preceded by Mark D. Harnitchek	Deputy Commander of the United States Transportation Command; 2011–2013	Succeeded by William A. Brown
