= Mark D. Harnitchek =

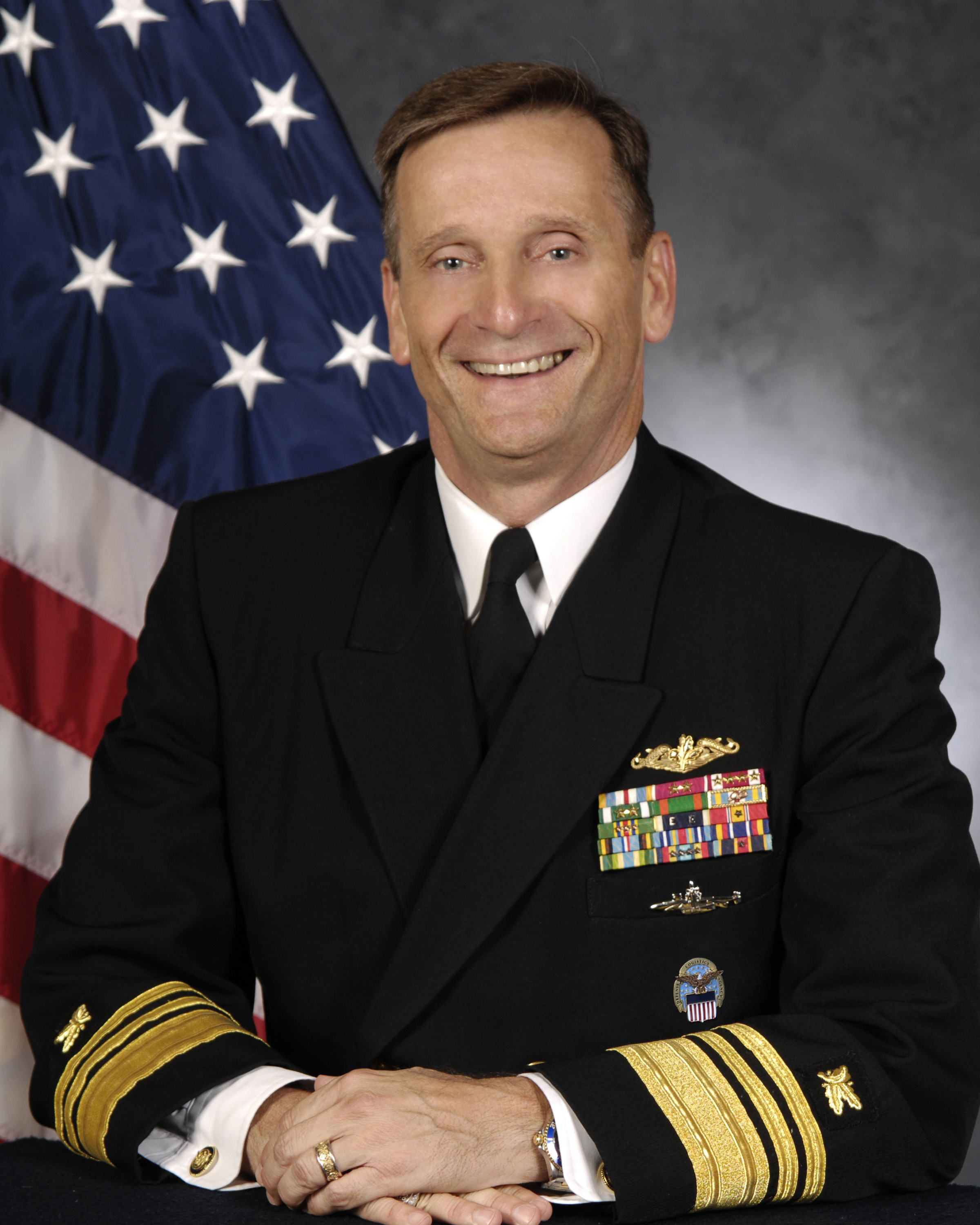
- Vice Admiral Mark D. Harnitchek
- Born: August 2, 1955 (age 71); Philadelphia, Pennsylvania, United States
- Military career
- Allegiance: United States of America
- Branch: United States Navy
- Service years: 1977 - 2015
- Rank: Vice Admiral
- Conflicts: Gulf War; Iraq war
- Awards: Defense Distinguished Service Medal; Defense Superior Service Medal; Legion of Merit; Meritorious Service Medal

Vice Adm. Mark David Harnitchek became director of the Defense Logistics Agency in November 2011. As such, he is responsible for providing the military services and other federal agencies with logistics, acquisition and technical services. These services include logistics information; materiel management; procurement, warehousing and distribution of spare parts, food, clothing, medical supplies and fuel; reutilization of surplus military materiel; and document automation and production.

In an April 5, 2020 phone call to White House Chief of Staff Mark Meadows, Senate Minority Leader Chuck Schumer touted Harnitchek as a potential COVID-19 czar to oversee the production and disbursement of medical equipment.

== Assignments ==
Harnitchek has served in a variety of sea tours including two submarines, USS Will Rogers (SSBN-659) and USS Buffalo (SSN-715); two ships, USS Holland (AS-32) and USS Proteus (AS-19); and the aircraft carrier USS Theodore Roosevelt (CVN-71). His shore tours include Commander, Submarine Group 7, Yokosuka, Japan; the Navy Ships Parts Control Center, Naval Air Station Oceana, Va.; and the Chief of Naval Operations Staff.

Flag assignments include commanding officer, Naval Inventory Control Point; vice director for logistics, the Joint Staff; director, Strategy, Policy, Programs and Logistics, U.S. Transportation Command; director, U. S. Central Command Deployment and Distribution Operations Center in Operations Iraqi and Enduring Freedom; and deputy commander, United States Transportation Command.

Military offices
Preceded by Ann E. Rondeau	Deputy Commander of the United States Transportation Command; 2009–2011	Succeeded by Kathleen M. Gainey
