= New Cumberland Defense Depot =

Coordinates: 40.20765°N 76.84039°W

The New Cumberland Defense Depot is a United States Department of Defense military base located a short distance south of Harrisburg, Pennsylvania, in Fairview Township, York County, Pennsylvania. It is adjacent to the Capital City Airport and a short distance east of the Harrisburg West Shore interchange of the Pennsylvania Turnpike (Interstate 76, which forms the southern boundary of the base) with Interstate 83 and to the north Interstate 81. The Susquehanna River forms the base's eastern boundary.

The depot covers 851 acres (344 ha) and includes the Administrative Support Center East and DLA Distribution. It employs about 3,000 civilian and 100 military personnel. The Quartermaster Corps originally built the depot at New Cumberland in 1918, naming it the Marsh Run Storage Depot.
