= Dan Gouré =

American academic

Dan Gouré is the Vice President of the Lexington Institute, a thinktank based in Arlington, Virginia, and an analyst on national security and military issues for NBC. He has worked as an adjunct professor in the National Defense University's Homeland Security program under the SNSEE since 2003. He is a member of the Department of Homeland Security's advisory board.

Gouré received a degree in Government and History from Pomona College, an MA in International Relations and Russian Studies from Johns Hopkins University, and a PhD in International Relations and Russian Studies from Johns Hopkins.

He served as the director of the Office of Strategic Competitiveness in the Office of the Secretary of Defense for two years and then served as the deputy director of the International Security Program at the Center for Strategic and International Studies. He worked as a member of the 2001 Department of Defense Transition.

He has taught at Johns Hopkins University, Georgetown University, the Foreign Service Institute, the National War College, the Naval War College, the Air War College, and the Inter-American Defense College.

He is the son of Sovietologist Leon Gouré.

On 30 November 2005, he defended the Department of Defense's practices of providing news stories for Iraqi newspapers.

Gouré has called on the United States to produce "several thousand" theater and tactical nuclear weapons. He also supports the production of several thousand nuclear-capable Lockheed Martin F-35 Lightning II stealth tactical fighter-bombers.

Gouré supports American arms sales to other countries, as a method of controlling them.

In 2012, Gouré questioned Obama's "courage", given the President's reluctance to subject the American military to "costs" in order to impose a no-fly zone over Syria.
