= Personnel Reliability Program =

Psychological evaluation of US DoD personnel

The Personnel Reliability Program (PRP) is a United States Department of Defense security, medical and psychological evaluation program, designed to permit only the most trustworthy individuals to have access to nuclear weapons (NPRP), chemical weapons (CPRP), and biological weapons (BPRP).

The program was first instituted for nuclear weapons during the Cold War; it was later extended to the realm of chemical and biological workers. Among its goals are, (Quoting from DOD Directive 5210.42)

1. The Department of Defense shall support the national security of the United States by maintaining an effective nuclear deterrent while protecting the public health, safety, and environment. For that reason, nuclear-weapons require special consideration because of their policy implications and military importance, their destructive power, and the political consequences of an accident or an unauthorized act. The safety, security, control, and effectiveness of nuclear weapons are of paramount importance to the security of the United States.
2. Nuclear weapons shall not be subject to loss, theft, sabotage, unauthorized use, unauthorized destruction, unauthorized disablement, jettison, or accidental damage.
3. Only those personnel who have demonstrated the highest degree of individual reliability for allegiance, trustworthiness, conduct, behavior, and responsibility shall be allowed to perform duties associated with nuclear weapons, and they shall be continuously evaluated for adherence to PRP standards.

The PRP evaluates many aspects of the individual's work life and home life. Any disruption of these, or severe deviation from an established norm would be cause to deny access. The denial might be temporary or permanent. However, the policy does explicitly state,

The denial of eligibility or the revocation of certification for assignment to PRP positions is neither a punitive measure nor the basis for disciplinary action. The failure of an individual to be certified for assignment to PRP duties does not necessarily reflect unfavorably on the individual's suitability for assignment to other duties.

In certain instances officers and enlisted personnel certified under PRP have been punished for information that also disqualifies them from the program. The suspension from, or indeed the permanent removal of an individual from the program in it itself does not represent a punitive measure.
