= T. Michael Moseley =

US Air Force general

Teed Michael Moseley
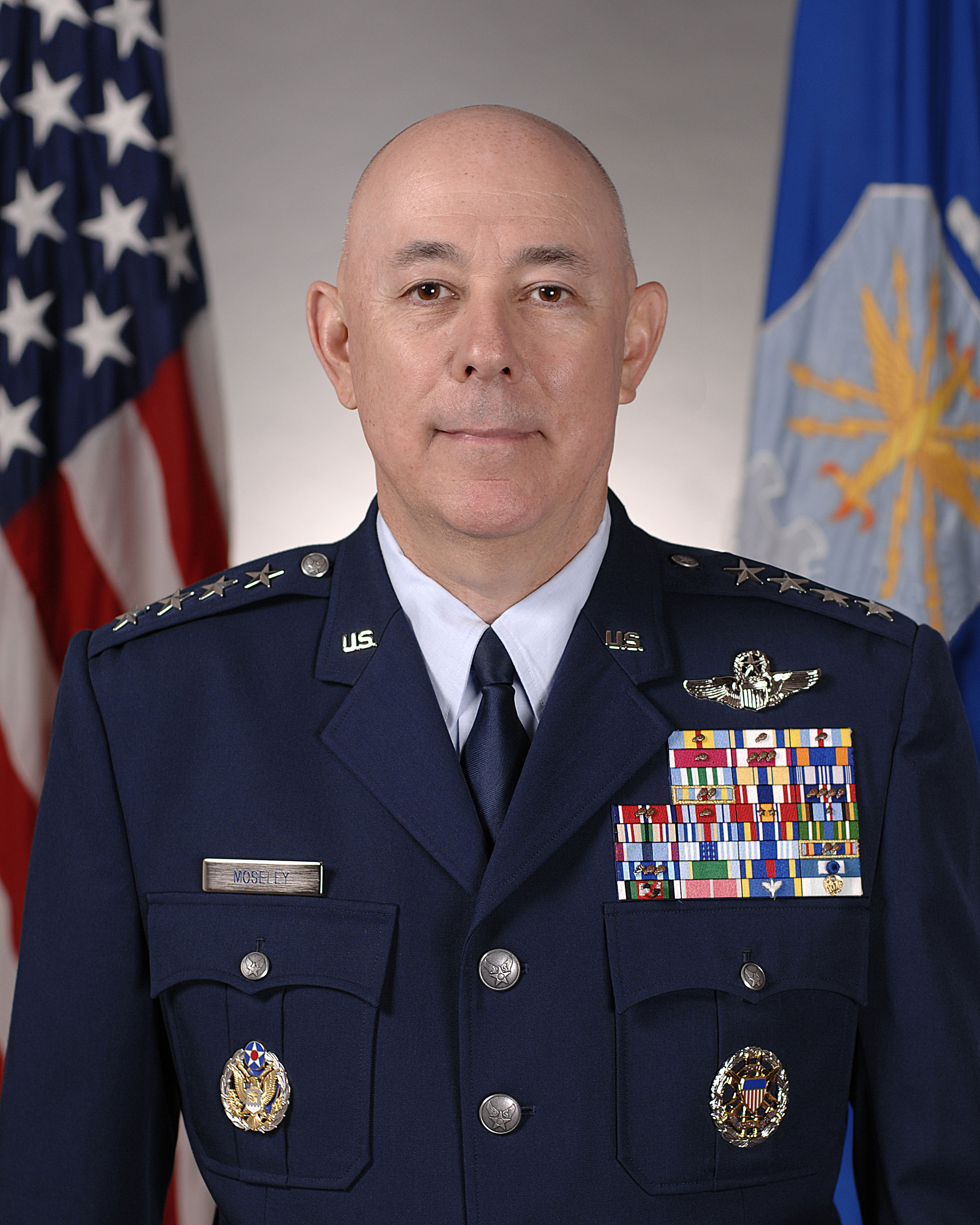
- General Teed Michael Moseley
- Born: September 3, 1949 (age 77); Grand Prairie, Texas, U.S.
- Military career
- Allegiance: United States
- Branch: United States Air Force
- Service years: 1971–2008
- Rank: General
- Commands: Chief of Staff of the United States Air Force; U.S. Central Command Air Forces; Ninth Air Force; 57th Wing; 33rd Operations Group; F-15 Division, U.S. Air Force Fighter Weapons School
- Conflicts: Operation Southern Watch; Operation Enduring Freedom; Operation Iraqi Freedom
- Awards: Defense Distinguished Service Medal (2); Air Force Distinguished Service Medal (3); Army Distinguished Service Medal; Navy Distinguished Service Medal; Coast Guard Distinguished Service Medal; Defense Superior Service Medal (2); Legion of Merit (2); Meritorious Service Medal (4); Air Medal

Teed Michael "Buzz" Moseley (born September 3, 1949) is a retired United States Air Force general who served as the 18th Chief of Staff of the United States Air Force. He is a fighter pilot with more than 3,000 flight hours in fighters and trainers, most in the F-15 Eagle.

On 2 September 2005, Moseley assumed his final Air Force assignment as Chief of Staff of the Air Force—the senior uniformed Air Force officer responsible for the organization, training and equipage of more than 700,000 active-duty, Guard, Reserve and civilian forces serving in the United States and overseas. As a member of the Joint Chiefs of Staff, the general and other service chiefs function as military advisers to the Secretary of Defense, National Security Council, and the President.

Moseley resigned from the Air Force at the request of U.S. Secretary of Defense Robert Gates in June 2008 in the wake of a number of Air Force scandals, including a 2007 scandal related to the Air Force's handling of the security of nuclear weapons at Minot Air Force Base. On 11 July 2008, a formal retirement ceremony was held for Moseley; he officially retired from the Air Force on 11 August 2008 after 37+ years of uniformed service.

== Background ==
Moseley was born in 1949 in Grand Prairie, Texas. He graduated from Texas A&M University in 1971 with a Bachelor of Arts degree in political science. He earned a Master of Arts degree from Texas A&M University in 1972, also in political science. He commanded the F-15 Division of the Air Force Fighter Weapons School at Nellis AFB, Nevada, the 33rd Operations Group at Eglin AFB, Florida, and the 57th Wing, the Air Force's largest, most diverse flying wing, also at Nellis. The general has served as the combat Director of Operations for Joint Task Force-Southwest Asia. General Moseley also commanded 9th Air Force and U.S. Central Command Air Forces while serving as Combined Forces Air Component Commander for Operations in Operation Southern Watch, Operation Enduring Freedom and Operation Iraqi Freedom. The general is a member of the Council on Foreign Relations. He has been awarded the Order of National Merit (Officer) and the Order of National Merit (Commander) by the president of the French Republic. The Order of National Merit is the second highest French military award. He has also been awarded the United Arab Emirates' Military Medal, 1st Class, by the president of the U.A.E.

Moseley's staff assignments have been a mix of operational, joint and personnel duties. These include serving in Washington, D.C., as Director for Legislative Liaison for the Secretary of the Air Force; Deputy Director for Politico-Military Affairs for Asia/Pacific and Middle East, the Joint Chiefs of Staff; Chief of the Air Force General Officer Matters Office; Chief of Staff of the Air Force Chair and Professor of Joint and Combined Warfare at the National War College; and Chief of the Tactical Fighter Branch, Tactical Forces Division, Directorate of Plans, Headquarters U.S. Air Force.

Moseley assumed the position of Chief of Staff of the Air Force during a ceremony at Andrews Air Force Base on September 2, 2005.

Moseley personally "adopted" the United States Air Force Academy Class of 2009 as his own, and has gone out of his way to address the future leaders of the U.S. Air Force. On March 8, 2007, the Grand Prairie ISD school board unanimously voted to name an elementary school opening in the 2007–2008 school year Mike Moseley Elementary School in honor of his achievements and as a native of Grand Prairie.

As a result of a series of high-profile scandals and his resistance to the new drone programs, Moseley, along with the Secretary of the Air Force, was forced to resign. His resignation was on 5 June 2008, in the wake of a report that criticized the service's handling of nuclear-weapons security related to the 2007 United States Air Force nuclear weapons incident and a misshipment of nuclear missile components to Taiwan. Following his resignation, Moseley continued to serve as Chief of Staff of the Air Force until his official retirement ceremony at Bolling AFB, Washington, D.C., on 11 July 2008. (See 2007 United States Air Force nuclear weapons incident)

On 11 July 2008, Moseley had his formal retirement ceremony at Bolling Air Force Base in Washington, D.C. Former Secretary of the Air Force, the Honorable Michael Wynne presided over the ceremony. Moseley officially retired from the Air Force on August 1, 2008.

== Education ==
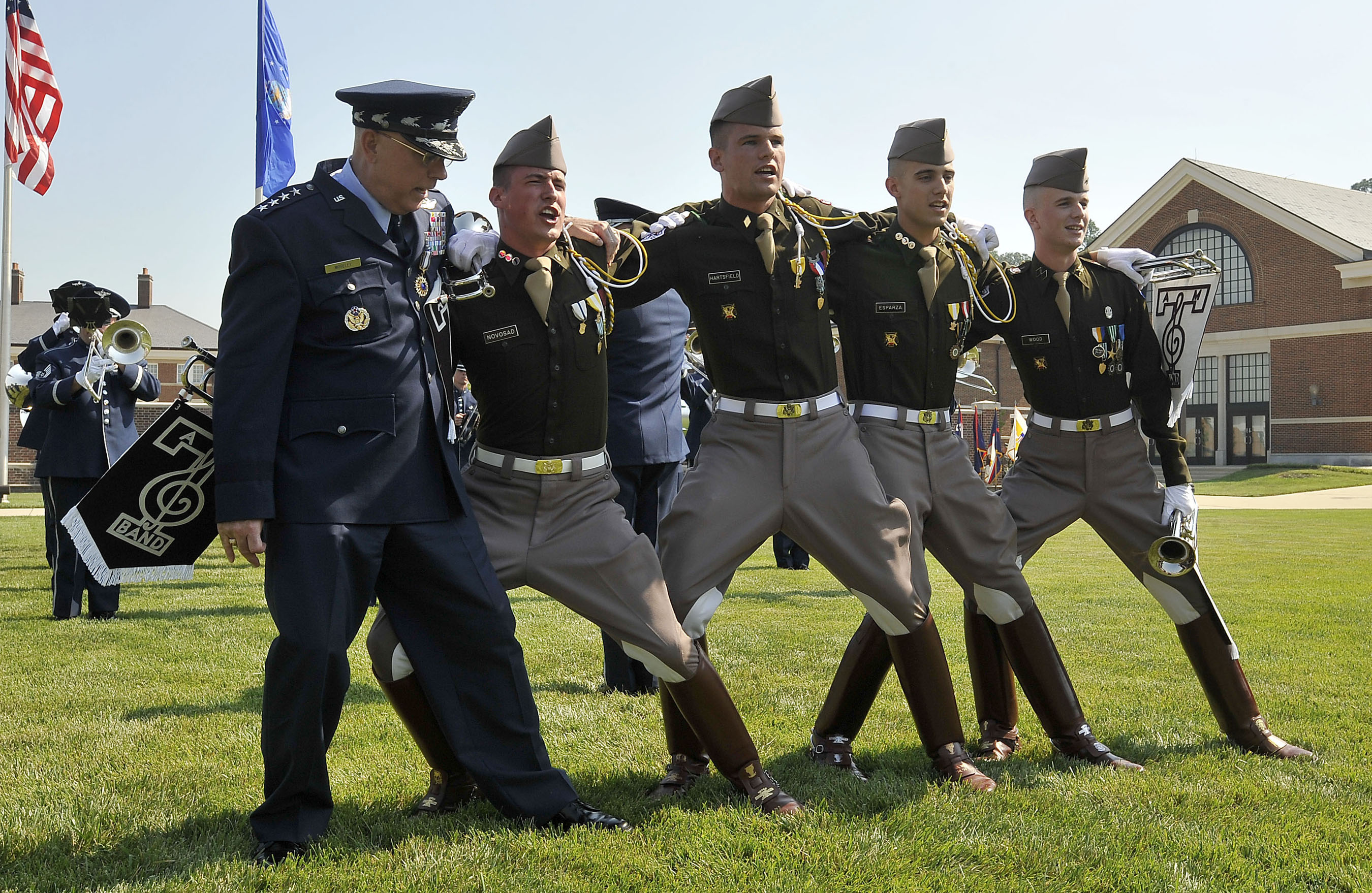
General Moseley at his retirement ceremony with cadets from his alma mater, Texas A&M University

- 1971 Bachelor of Arts degree in political science, Texas A&M University, College Station, Texas
- 1972 Master of Arts degree in political science, Texas A&M University, College Station, Texas
- 1977 Squadron Officer School, Maxwell AFB, Alabama
- 1981 Fighter Weapons Instructor Course, U.S. Air Force Fighter Weapons School, Nellis AFB, Nevada
- 1984 Air Command and Staff College, Maxwell AFB, Alabama
- 1988 U.S. Air Force Joint Senior Battle Commander's Course, Hurlburt Field, Florida
- 1990 National War College, Fort Lesley J. McNair, Washington, D.C.
- 2000 Combined Forces Air Component Commander Course, Maxwell AFB, Alabama, and Hurlburt Field, Florida

== Assignments ==
1. June 1972 – May 1973, student, Undergraduate Pilot Training, Webb AFB, Texas
2. May 1973 – July 1977, T-37 instructor pilot and spin flight test pilot; flight check pilot, and standardization and evaluation flight examiner, 3389th Flying Training Squadron, 78th Flying Training Wing, Webb AFB, Texas
3. July 1977 – September 1979, F-15 instructor pilot, flight lead and mission commander, 7th Tactical Fighter Squadron, Holloman AFB, New Mexico
4. September 1979 – August 1983, F-15 weapons and tactics officer, instructor pilot, and flight lead and mission commander; standardization and evaluation/ flight examiner, 44th Tactical Fighter Squadron and 12th Tactical Fighter Squadron, Kadena Air Base, Japan
5. August 1983 – June 1984, course officer, Air Command and Staff College, Maxwell AFB, Alabama
6. June 1984 – June 1987, Chief, Tactical Fighter Branch, Tactical Forces Division, Directorate of Plans, Deputy Chief of Staff for Plans and Operations, Headquarters U.S. Air Force, Washington, D.C.
7. June 1987 – June 1989, Commander, F-15 Division, and instructor pilot, Fighter Weapons Instructor Course, U.S. Air Force Fighter Weapons School, Nellis AFB, Nevada
8. June 1989 – June 1990, course officer, National War College, Fort Lesley J. McNair, Washington, D.C.
9. June 1990 – August 1992, Chief of Staff of the Air Force Chair and Professor of Joint and Combined Warfare, National War College, Fort Lesley J. McNair, Washington, D.C.
10. August 1992 – January 1994, Commander, 33rd Operations Group, Eglin AFB, Florida
11. January 1994 – May 1996, Chief, Air Force General Officer Matters Office, Headquarters U.S. Air Force, Washington, D.C.
12. May 1996 – November 1997, Commander, 57th Wing, Nellis AFB, Nevada
13. November 1997 – July 1999, Deputy Director for Politico-Military Affairs, Asia/Pacific and Middle East, Directorate for Strategic Plans and Policy, the Joint Chiefs of Staff, Washington, D.C.
14. July 1999 – October 2001, Director, Legislative Liaison, Office of the Secretary of the Air Force, Headquarters U.S. Air Force, Washington, D.C.
15. November 2001 – August 2003, Commander, 9th Air Force and U.S. Central Command Air Forces, Shaw AFB, South Carolina
16. August 2003 – August 2005, Vice Chief of Staff, Headquarters U.S. Air Force, Washington, D.C.
17. September 2005 – July 2008, Chief of Staff, Headquarters U.S. Air Force, Washington, D.C.

== Flight information ==
Rating: Command pilot
Flight hours: approximately 3,000
Aircraft flown: T-37, T-38, AT-38 and F-15A/B/C/D

== Honors ==
For his combat leadership of Operation Enduring Freedom, Operation Northern Watch, Operation Southern Watch, Operation Southern Focus, Operation Iraqi Freedom, General Moseley was awarded the General H.H. Arnold Award, the Air Force Association's highest tribute to leadership. Additionally, the Air Force Association has awarded him a "Life Time Achievement Award" for his efforts in support of the restoration of the Lafayette Escadrille Memorial in Paris, France. The Association has also named him a General Ira Eaker Fellow for "Principled Leadership" while serving as the 18thChief of Staff. Texas A&M University recognized his accomplishments and dedicated services with their Distinguished Alumnus Award, the highest honor bestowed upon a former student. Other leadership awards include: the Texas A&M University Corps of Cadets Hall of Honor, the South Carolina Chamber of Commerce Sergeant William Jasper Freedom Award, the General "Jimmy" Doolittle Award for leadership and dedication to American Air Power by the Massachusetts Institute of Technology and the General James Hartinger Award for achievements in advancing the military space mission. General Moseley was also the first inductee into the Frontier of Flight Hall of Fame in Dallas, Texas. General Moseley has also been singularly honored by the Mayor of Grand Prairie, Texas and by the Independent School District of Grand Prairie by having a public school named after him in his hometown – the Mike Moseley Elementary School.

General Moseley was knighted by Her Majesty the Queen of the United Kingdom as a Knight Commander of the Most Excellent Order of the British Empire (KBE). His Majesty, the King of Saudi Arabia, awarded him the King Abdulaziz Excellence Medal, the Kingdom's highest award. The President of the French Republic named him a Commander in the French National Order of Merit. That award is in addition to the President of the French Republic's previous naming him Officer of the French National Order of Merit. He has also been awarded the United Arab Emirates highest award and equally prestigious awards from the Minister of Defense from the Republic of Singapore and from Brazil.

General Moseley was personally awarded two Defense Distinguished Service Medals by the Secretary of Defense for his combat innovation and leadership in the Middle East as well as for his transformational vision for the American Military. Upon retirement, General Moseley was awarded a third United States Air Force Distinguished Service Medal for his combat and peacetime leadership and personal contributions to national security. Additionally, upon retirement, he was awarded Distinguished Service Medals from the Department of the Navy, the Department of the Army and from the Department of Homeland Security (United States Coast Guard). In September 2017, he was also awarded the Air Force's highest civilian award, the Distinguished Public Service Award for his post-retirement, continued contributions to national security by the Secretary and Chief of Staff of the United States Air Force. Moseley had an elementary school named in his honor in Moseley's home town of Grand Prairie, Texas in 2007.

== Major awards and decorations ==
US Air Force Command Pilot Badge
Joint Chiefs of Staff Badge
Headquarters Air Force Badge

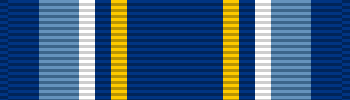
Defense Distinguished Service Medal with two bronze oak leaf clusters
Air Force Distinguished Service Medal with two bronze oak leaf clusters
Army Distinguished Service Medal
Navy Distinguished Service Medal
Coast Guard Distinguished Service Medal
Defense Superior Service Medal with bronze oak leaf cluster
Legion of Merit with oak leaf cluster
Meritorious Service Medal with three bronze oak leaf clusters
Air Medal
Joint Service Commendation Medal
Air Force Commendation Medal
Air Force Achievement Medal
Joint Meritorious Unit Award with two bronze oak leaf clusters
Air Force Meritorious Unit Award
Air Force Outstanding Unit Award with four bronze oak leaf clusters
Air Force Organizational Excellence Award with two bronze oak leaf clusters
Secretary of the Air Force Distinguished Public Service Award
Combat Readiness Medal with bronze oak leaf cluster
National Defense Service Medal with two bronze service star
Armed Forces Expeditionary Medal with bronze service star
Southwest Asia Service Medal
Global War on Terrorism Expeditionary Medal
Global War on Terrorism Service Medal
Korea Defense Service Medal
Humanitarian Service Medal
Air Force Overseas Short Tour Service Ribbon
Air Force Overseas Long Tour Service Ribbon
Air Force Expeditionary Service Ribbon with gold frame and two bronze oak leaf clusters
Air Force Longevity Service Award with silver and three bronze oak leaf clusters
Small Arms Expert Marksmanship Ribbon
Air Force Training Ribbon
Commander of the French National Order of Merit (Moseley was an officer in the order before being elevated to commander)
Member First Class of the United Arab Emirates' Military Merit Order
Knight Commander of the Most Excellent Order of the British Empire, Military division (KBE)
Brazilian Santos-Dumont Medal of Merit
Singaporean Meritorious Service Medal (Military)
King Abdulaziz Excellence Medal (Saudi Arabia)
SICOFAA Legion of Merit Grand Cross

== Effective dates of promotion ==
Promotions
Insignia	Rank	Date
	General	October 1, 2003
	Lieutenant General	November 7, 2001
	Major general	February 1, 2000
	Brigadier general	December 1, 1996
	Colonel	April 1, 1991
	Lieutenant colonel	March 1, 1986
	Major	October 1, 1983
	Captain	January 9, 1976
	First lieutenant	July 9, 1974
	Second lieutenant	July 9, 1971

== Activities since retirement ==
Moseley has called for the retirement of the Fairchild Republic A-10 Thunderbolt II, comparing it to the North American P-51 Mustang which had been quickly retired after the Second World War and then even more quickly pressed back into active service at the start of the Korea War.

== See also ==
- List of United States Air Force four-star generals

Military offices
Preceded by Robert H. Foglesong	Vice Chief of Staff of the United States Air Force; 2003–2005	Succeeded by John D. W. Corley
Preceded by John P. Jumper	Chief of Staff of the United States Air Force; 2005–2008	Succeeded by Norton A. Schwartz
