= Polly Peyer =

United States general

Polly A. Peyer
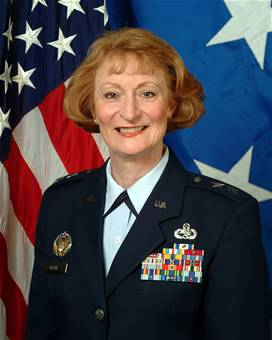
- Major General Polly Peyer
- Military career
- Allegiance: United States of America
- Branch: United States Air Force
- Rank: Major General
- Commands: Warner Robins Air Logistics Center
- Conflicts: Gulf War; Operation Iraqi Freedom
- Awards: Distinguished Service Medal; Defense Superior Service Medal; Legion of Merit; Meritorious Service Medal; Air Force Commendation Medal; Air Force Achievement Medal

Polly A. Peyer is a retired major general in the U.S. Air Force. She previously commanded the Warner Robins Air Logistics Center at Robins AFB in Warner Robins, Georgia.

She has served as the director of logistics, Headquarters Pacific Air Forces, at the Hickam Air Force Base in Hawaii. In addition she served as military assistant to the acting secretary of the Air Force.

== Education ==
- Bachelor's degree in Criminology from Florida State University in 1971.
- Master's degree in Business Administration from the University of Northern Colorado in 1980.
