= Eastern Distribution Center =

Coordinates: 40°12′34″N 76°50′15″W

The Eastern Distribution Center (EDC), located in New Cumberland, Pennsylvania, 3 miles (4.8 km) west of Harrisburg, is home to the largest distribution facility operated by the United States Department of Defense. It is managed by the Defense Logistics Agency (DLA) and is part of the Defense Distribution Depot Susquehanna (DDSP), which includes the operations of the nearby Naval Support Activity (NSA) in Mechanicsburg, Pennsylvania.

== History ==
This military installation was originally built in the latter stages of the First World War under the supervision of the U.S. Army Corps of Engineers, but currently serves as a consolidated management and logistics center based upon a restructuring pursued in the 1990s.

In April 1990 Secretary of Defense Dick Cheney directed that all the distribution depots of the military services and DLA be consolidated into a single, unified material distribution system to reduce overhead and costs. The consolidation began in October 1990 and was completed March 16, 1992. The system consisted of 30 depots at 32 sites with 62 storage locations, which stored over 8.7 million spare parts, subsistence, and other consumable items worth $127 billion in 788 million square feet (73 km^{2}) of storage. Until September 1997, two regional offices - Defense Distribution Region East in New Cumberland, Pennsylvania, and Defense Distribution Region West in Stockton, California, managed a vast network of distribution depots within their respective geographic boundaries. They later merged into the Defense Distribution Center, New Cumberland. The name of the facility was later changed to the Eastern Distribution Center.

Also under DDC's auspices is the Defense Distribution Depot, Susquehanna, PA (DDSP), which includes operations of the nearby Naval Support Activity (NSA) in Mechanicsburg, Pennsylvania. DDSP is the largest of the 24 depots and supports a customer base that includes Europe, North Africa, Central and South America, Southwest Asia and the eastern half of the United States. DDSP is also the site of the Eastern Distribution Center, which is the largest automated warehouse in the Department of Defense. Tenants at DDC's New Cumberland base include all branches of the Armed Forces.

== See also ==
- Defense Logistics Agency
