= Leon Gouré =

American political scientist

Leon Gouré (November 1, 1922 – March 16, 2007) was a Soviet Union-born American political scientist and analyst. His studies for the RAND Corporation in the 1960s and 1970s helped influence civil defense preparedness in the United States and U.S. strategy in the Vietnam War.

== Early life ==
Gouré was born in Moscow, son of Boris and Sophie Gourevitsch, who were Mensheviks who opposed the Bolshevik regime and went into exile in Berlin in 1923. They escaped Nazi persecution, fleeing to France in 1933 and then, in 1940, fled Paris to the United States, where they settled in Hoboken, New Jersey.

Gouré enlisted in the United States Army and became a U.S. citizen in 1943. He fought as in the U.S. Infantry in World War II before serving in U.S. counterintelligence capacities after the war. He interviewed Nazis and their collaborators who were had been held as prisoners.

== Education ==
After his discharge, Gouré attended New York University, graduating in 1947. He then received a master's degree from Columbia University in 1949. He joined the Rand Corporation in Washington, D.C. in 1954, later transferring to the organization's offices in Santa Monica, California in 1959. He received a doctorate in political science from Georgetown University in 1961.

== Career ==
=== Rand Corporation ===
As a Rand Corporation analyst, Gouré began to develop his ideas on civil defense in the Soviet Union. In 1961, he wrote a report suggesting that the Soviet Union had massively increased their civil defense preparations to protect large numbers of people in the event of a nuclear war. His reports on the subject contributed to the expansion of civil defense measures in the United States during the 1970s and 1980s. In 1973, he wrote that:

The fundamental Soviet view is that the better the USSR is prepared for war, the greater and more credible is its ability to deter its adversary from risking military confrontation. This is the main reason why Moscow categorically rejects any concept of security based on a balance of 'mutual assured destruction.'

He advised the Lyndon Johnson administration on the Vietnam War. Malcolm Gladwell wrote in 2013 that Gouré was "brilliant, charismatic, incredibly charming and absolutely ruthless".

He took over the Viet Cong Motivation and Morale Project, and in 1964 lived for a period in Saigon, where his staff were sent to interview Viet Cong combatants. His report concluded [falsy] that the Viet Cong were demoralized and would surrender after further bombing, and he briefed leading military figures accordingly. Gouré's analysis influenced U.S. policy for several years.

=== University of Miami and Science Applications International ===
Gouré joined the University of Miami in 1969 as director of Soviet studies at the University of Miami's Center for Advanced International Studies. In 1980, he joined Science Applications International Corp., a consulting firm, where he remained until his retirement in 2004.

=== Books ===
Gouré's books included The Siege of Leningrad and Civil Defense in the Soviet Union, both published in 1962. In 2009, his papers were acquired by the Hoover Institution at Stanford University.

== Death ==
A resident of Potomac, Maryland, he died in 2007 of congestive heart failure in Arlington, Virginia at age 84. He was buried in Arlington National Cemetery.
