= List of United States Navy installations =

List of major active US Navy bases, stations and other facilities. Formally established by General Order No 135 (1911), the following primary types of bases are defined:

- Naval Station: any establishment for building, manufacturing, docking, repair, supply, or training under the control of the Navy.
- Navy Yard: a single establishment for docking, repair, and supply. It may include building and manufacturing facilities. Either alone or with other naval establishments it constitutes a naval station.
- Naval Base: is a point from which naval operations may be conducted and which is selected for that purpose. Its essential feature is an adequate anchorage for a fleet with its auxiliaries, preferably sheltered from the sea and fortified against attack. A temporary base would generally be established nearer the theater of war than any permanent base (also referred to as an advanced base). A permanent base would have docking and repair facilities.
Map of United States Navy Installations

== Within the United States ==
=== California ===
- Concord Naval Weapons Station
- Fleet Numerical Meteorology and Oceanography Center
- Naval Air Weapons Station China Lake
- Naval Base San Diego
- Naval Base Coronado
  - Naval Amphibious Base Coronado
  - Naval Air Station North Island
  - Naval Outlying Field Imperial Beach
  - Naval Auxiliary Landing Field San Clemente Island
- Naval Base Point Loma
- Naval Medical Center San Diego
- Naval Air Facility El Centro
- Naval Air Station Lemoore
- Naval Support Activity Monterey
  - Naval Postgraduate School
- Naval Weapons Station Seal Beach
- Naval Base Ventura County
  - Naval Air Station Point Mugu
  - Naval Construction Battalion Center Port Hueneme
  - Naval Outlying Landing Field San Nicolas Island
- Naval Surface Warfare Center

=== Connecticut ===
- Naval Submarine Base New London

=== Florida ===
- Naval Air Station Jacksonville
- Naval Air Station Key West
- Naval Station Mayport
- Naval Support Activity Orlando
- Naval Support Activity Panama City
- Naval Air Station Pensacola
  - Naval Air Station Pensacola Corry Station
- Naval Air Station Whiting Field
- Naval Ordnance Test Unit Cape Canaveral

=== Georgia ===
- Naval Submarine Base Kings Bay

=== Hawaii ===
- Naval Computer and Telecommunications Area Master Station Pacific
- Pacific Missile Range Facility
- Naval Station Pearl Harbor
- NSGA Kunia
- Naval Radio Transmitting Facility Lualualei

=== Illinois ===
- Naval Station Great Lakes

=== Indiana ===
- Naval Surface Warfare Center Crane Division/Naval Support Activity Crane

=== Louisiana ===
- Naval Air Station Joint Reserve Base New Orleans

=== Maine ===
- Portsmouth Naval Shipyard
- NCTAMS LANT Det Cutler

=== Maryland ===
- Indian Head Naval Surface Warfare Center
- Walter Reed National Military Medical Center
- Navy Information Operations Command Maryland
- Naval Support Facility Thurmont
- Naval Surface Warfare Center Carderock Division
- Naval Air Station Patuxent River
- Naval Support Activity Annapolis
- United States Naval Academy, Annapolis

=== Mississippi ===
- Naval Air Station Meridian
- Naval Construction Battalion Center (Gulfport, Mississippi)
- Stennis Space Center

=== Nevada ===
- Naval Air Station Fallon

=== New Jersey ===
- Naval Weapons Station Earle
- Lakehurst Maxfield Field (formerly Naval Air Engineering Station Lakehurst) (part of Joint Base McGuire-Dix-Lakehurst)

=== New Mexico ===
- Naval Air Warfare Center Weapons Division, White Sands Detachment

=== New York ===
- Naval Support Facility Saratoga Springs

=== North Dakota ===
- Naval Computer and Telecommunications Area Master Station Atlantic Detachment LaMoure

=== Pennsylvania ===
- Naval Support Activity Mechanicsburg
- Naval Support Activity Philadelphia
- The Navy Yard, Philadelphia

=== Rhode Island ===
- Naval Station Newport

=== South Carolina ===
- Naval Support Activity Charleston
- United States Naval Hospital Beaufort

=== Tennessee ===
- Naval Support Activity Mid-South

=== Texas ===
- Naval Air Station Corpus Christi
- Naval Air Station Joint Reserve Base Fort Worth
- Naval Air Station Kingsville
- Medical Education and Training Campus

=== Virginia ===
- Naval Air Station Oceana
  - Navy and Marine Corps Intelligence Training Center Dam Neck, Virginia
- Naval Amphibious Base Little Creek
- Naval Medical Center Portsmouth, Virginia
- Norfolk Naval Shipyard
- Naval Security Group Activity Chesapeake
- Naval Station Norfolk
- Naval Support Activity South Potomac
  - Naval Surface Warfare Center Dahlgren Division
- Naval Support Activity Hampton Roads
- Naval Weapons Station Yorktown
- Naval Auxiliary Landing Field Fentress
- Training Support Center Hampton Roads, formerly Fleet Combat Training Center Atlantic Dam Neck
- Wallops Island ASCS

=== Washington ===
- Naval Station Everett
- Naval Base Kitsap
  - Naval Submarine Base Bangor
  - Naval Station Bremerton
  - Naval Hospital Bremerton
  - Naval Undersea Warfare Center Keyport
- Puget Sound Naval Shipyard
- Naval Air Station Whidbey Island
- Naval Magazine Indian Island
- Jim Creek Naval Radio Station

=== Washington, D.C. ===
- United States Naval Observatory
- Naval Support Facility Anacostia
- Washington Navy Yard
- United States Naval Research Laboratory

=== West Virginia ===
- Navy Information Operations Command Sugar Grove

=== Development ===
- In January 2024, the US Navy requested a new permit for the installation and maintenance of mine training areas off the coasts of Hawaii and Southern California, as the Pacific Ocean, according to the command, is a priority theater of operations amid tensions with China. The current permit expires in 2025 and the Navy is required to submit an environmental impact report to extend it.

== United States territories ==
=== Guam ===
- Naval Base Guam
- Andersen Air Force Base
- United States Naval Hospital Guam
- NCTAMS Guam

=== Puerto Rico ===
- Aguada Transmission Station
- Navy Operational Support Center Puerto Rico
- Navy Reserve Support Detachment Roosevelt

== Overseas ==
=== United States Africa Command ===
==== Djibouti ====
- Camp Lemonnier

=== United States Central Command ===
==== Bahrain ====
- Naval Support Activity Bahrain
- Muharraq Airfield

==== Kuwait ====
- Kuwait Naval Base

==== Oman ====
- Masirah

==== Qatar ====
- Doha International Airport

==== Saudi Arabia ====
- King Abdul Aziz IAP, Jeddah
- King Fahd Naval Base, Jeddah

==== United Arab Emirates ====
- Fujairah International Airport
- Jebel Ali Port Facility

=== United States European Command ===
==== Greece ====
- Naval Support Activity Souda Bay

==== Italy ====
- Naval Support Activity Naples
  - Naval Support Activity Gaeta
- Naval Air Station Sigonella
  - Augusta Bay Port Facility
- Naval Computer and Telecommunications Station Naples, Italy

==== Poland ====
- Naval Support Facility Redzikowo

==== Romania ====
- Naval Support Facility Deveselu

==== Spain ====
- Naval Station Rota

=== United States Northern Command ===
==== Bahamas ====
- Atlantic Undersea Test and Evaluation Center

=== United States Pacific Command ===
==== Australia ====
- Naval Communication Station Harold E. Holt

==== British Indian Ocean Territory ====
- Naval Support Facility Diego Garcia

==== Japan ====
- Naval Air Facility Atsugi
- Misawa Air Base
- Camp Shields
- White Beach Naval Base
- Naval Radio Transmitter Awase
- Commander Fleet Activities Sasebo
- Commander Fleet Activities Yokosuka
- Naval Computer and Telecommunications Station Yokosuka, Japan

==== Republic of Korea ====
- Busan Naval Base
- Jinhae Naval Base

==== Philippines ====
- U.S. Naval Base Subic Bay

==== Singapore ====
- Sembawang Naval Base
- Changi Naval Base

=== United States Southern Command ===
==== El Salvador ====
- Cooperative Security Location Comalapa, El Salvador

==== Cuba ====
- Guantanamo Bay Naval Base

== See also ==
- List of United States military bases
- List of United States Marine Corps installations
- List of United States Air Force installations
- List of United States Coast Guard installations
- List of United States Space Force installations
