= List of American military installations =

Bases operated by the U.S. Department of Defense

Countries containing foreign bases and military installations of the United States.

Map of US military bases within the continental United States. Military bases are found in all 50 US states.

Foreign bases and military installations of the United States.

This is a list of military installations owned or used by the Department of Defense both in the United States and around the world. This list details only current or recently closed facilities; some defunct facilities are found at Category:Former military installations of the United States.

A military installation is the basic administrative unit into which the U.S. Department of Defense groups its infrastructure, and is statutorily defined as any "base, camp, post, station, yard, center, or other activity under the jurisdiction ... [or] operational control of the Secretary of a military department or the Secretary of Defense". An installation or group of installations may, in turn, serve as a base, which DOD defines as "a locality from which operations are projected or supported".

The U.S. military maintains hundreds of installations, both inside the United States and overseas (with at least 128 military bases located outside of its national territory as of July 2024). According to the U.S. Army, Camp Humphreys in South Korea is the largest overseas base in terms of area. Most foreign military installations are located in NATO countries, Middle East countries, South Korea, Australia, and Japan.

U.S. officials have been accused of collaborating with oppressive regimes and anti-democratic governments to secure their military bases, from Central America to Africa, and to West and East Asia. The Democracy Index classifies many of the forty-five current non-democratic U.S. base hosts as fully "authoritarian governments". Military bases in non-democratic states were often rationalized during the Cold War by the U.S. as a necessary if undesirable condition in defending against Soviet influence. Few of these bases have been abandoned since the end of the Cold War.

Several rounds of closures and mergers have occurred since the end of World War II, a procedure most recently known as Base Realignment and Closure.

== Domestic bases ==
=== Domestic joint bases ===
- The Pentagon – located in Arlington County, Virginia, across the Potomac River from Washington, D.C.
- Joint Base Elmendorf–Richardson – located 12 kilometers (8 miles) north of Anchorage, Alaska
- Joint Base Pearl Harbor–Hickam – located 11 kilometers (7 miles) northwest of Honolulu, Hawaii
- Joint Base McGuire–Dix–Lakehurst – located 29 kilometers (18 miles) south of Trenton, New Jersey
- Joint Base Lindsey Graham (formally Joint Base Charleston) – located 8 kilometers (5 miles) east of North Charleston, South Carolina
- Joint Base San Antonio – located 8 kilometers (5 miles) north of San Antonio, Texas
- Joint Base Langley–Eustis – located 12 kilometers (8 miles) east of Newport News, Virginia
- Joint Region Marianas – combines Naval Base Guam, Andersen Air Force Base and Marine Corps Base Camp Blaz all located on the U.S. territory of Guam
- Joint Base Myer–Henderson Hall – located 1 kilometer (1 mile) northwest of Arlington County, Virginia
- Joint Expeditionary Base Little Creek–Fort Story – located in and around Virginia Beach
- Joint Base Lewis–McChord – located 17 kilometers (11 miles) southwest of Tacoma, Washington
- Joint Base Anacostia–Bolling – located in Southeast Washington, D.C.
- Joint Base Andrews – located 22 kilometers (14 miles) south of Washington, D.C.
- Joint Forces Training Base – Los Alamitos – located in Los Alamitos, California (ARNG/USAR)

=== United States Army ===
The following is a list of domestic U.S. Army installations, organized by the U.S. state or territory that hosts it. For consistency, major Army National Guard (ARNG) training facilities are included but armory locations are not. In addition, the abbreviation "USAR" indicates when an installation is affiliated with the U.S. Army Reserve.

See the list of former United States Army installations for inactive domestic U.S. Army installations.

==== Alabama army bases ====
- Anniston Army Depot
- Fort Rucker
- Fort McClellan (ARNG training site/base/Alabama Military Academy)
- Redstone Arsenal

==== American Samoa army bases ====
- Pele U.S. Army Reserve Center & Coast Guard Marine Safety Detachment Samoa

==== Alaska army bases ====
- Fort Greely
- Fort Richardson
- Fort Wainwright

==== Arizona army bases ====
- Camp Navajo (ARNG)
- Fort Huachuca
- Yuma Proving Ground

==== Arkansas army bases ====
- Robinson Maneuver Training Center (ARNG)
- Fort Chaffee Maneuver Training Center (ARNG)
- Pine Bluff Arsenal

==== California army bases ====
- Camp Roberts (ARNG)
- Camp San Luis Obispo (ARNG)
- Fort Hunter Liggett (USAR)
- Fort Irwin
- Military Ocean Terminal Concord
- Camp Parks (USAR)
- Presidio of Monterey
- San Joaquin Depot
  - Sharpe Facility
  - Stockton's Rough & Ready Island
  - Tracy Facility
- Sierra Army Depot

==== Colorado army bases ====
- Fort Carson
  - Piñon Canyon Maneuver Site

==== Connecticut army bases ====
- Camp Nett (ARNG)

==== Delaware army bases ====
- Bethany Beach Training Site (ARNG)

==== District of Columbia army bases ====
- Joint Base Myer–Henderson Hall
  - Fort Lesley J. McNair

==== Florida army bases ====
- Camp Blanding (ARNG)
- Shades of Green (Morale, Welfare and Recreation (MWR Resort)
- Camp Bull Simons on Eglin Air Force Base
- United States Army Simulation and Training Technology Center

==== Georgia army bases ====
- Camp Frank D. Merrill
- Fort Benning
- Fort Gordon
- Fort Stewart
- Hunter Army Airfield

==== Hawaii army bases ====
- Fort DeRussy (MWR Resort)
  - Hale Koa Hotel
- Fort Shafter
- Pohakuloa Training Area
- Schofield Barracks
  - Wheeler Army Airfield
- United States Army Test and Evaluation Command - Hawaii

==== Idaho army bases ====
- MTA Gowen Field Boise (ARNG)
- Orchard Range TS Boise (ARNG)
- TS Edgemeade Mountain Home (ARNG)

==== Illinois army bases ====
- Camp Lincoln Commissary Building (ARNG)
- Rock Island Arsenal
- Charles M. Price Support Center (USAR)

==== Indiana army bases ====
- Camp Atterbury (ARNG)
- Fort Benjamin Harrison (ARNG)
- Muscatatuck Urban Training Center (ARNG)

==== Iowa army bases ====
- Camp Dodge
- Iowa Army Ammunition Plant

==== Kansas army bases ====
- Fort Leavenworth
- Fort Riley
- Great Plains Joint Training Center (ARNG)

==== Kentucky army bases ====
- Blue Grass Army Depot
- Fort Campbell
- Fort Knox
- Wendell H. Ford Regional Training Center (ARNG)

==== Louisiana army bases ====
- Fort Polk
- Camp Minden (ARNG)
- Camp Beauregard (ARNG)

==== Maine army bases ====
- MTA Deepwoods (ARNG)
- MTA Riley-Bog Brook (ARNG)
- TS Caswell (ARNG)
- TS Hollis Plains (ARNG)

==== Maryland army bases ====
- Aberdeen Proving Ground
- Camp Fretterd Military Reservation (ARNG)
- Fort Detrick
- Fort Meade

==== Massachusetts army bases ====
- Camp Curtis Guild (ARNG)
- Camp Edwards (ARNG)
- Combat Capabilities Development Command Soldier Center
- Fort Devens (USAR)

==== Michigan army bases ====
- Camp Grayling (ARNG)
- Detroit Arsenal
- Fort Custer (ARNG)

==== Minnesota army bases ====
- Camp Ripley (ARNG)
- Fort Snelling (USAR)

==== Mississippi army bases ====
- Camp McCain Training Center (CMTC) (ARNG)
- Camp Shelby (ARNG)

==== Missouri army bases ====
- Camp Clark, Missouri (ARNG)
- Camp Crowder (ARNG)
- Fort Leonard Wood
- Ike Skelton Training Site (ARNG)
- Jefferson Barracks Military Post (ARNG)
- Lake City Army Ammunition Plant
- Macon Training Site (ARNG)
- Truman Training Site (ARNG)
- Wappapello Training Site (ARNG)

==== Montana army bases ====
- Fort William Henry Harrison (ARNG)

==== Nebraska army bases ====
- Camp Ashland (ARNG)

==== Nevada army bases ====
- Hawthorne Army Depot

==== New Hampshire army bases ====
- Center Strafford Training Site (ARNG)
- Cold Regions Research and Engineering Laboratory

==== New Jersey army bases ====
- Fort Dix, part of Joint Base McGuire–Dix–Lakehurst
  - Joint Training and Training Development Center (ARNG) on Joint Base McGuire–Dix–Lakehurst
- Picatinny Arsenal

==== New Mexico army bases ====
- Fort Bliss
- Los Alamos Demolition Range
- White Sands Missile Range

==== New York army bases ====
- Camp Smith (ARNG)
- Fort Drum
- Fort Hamilton
- United States Military Academy
- Watervliet Arsenal

==== North Carolina army bases ====
- Camp Butner (ARNG)
- Fort Bragg
- Military Ocean Terminal Sunny Point

==== North Dakota army bases ====
- Camp Grafton (ARNG)

==== Ohio army bases ====
- Camp Perry (ARNG)
- Camp Ravenna Joint Military Training Center (ARNG)
- Camp Sherman (ARNG)
- Defense Supply Center, Columbus

==== Oklahoma army bases ====
- Camp Gruber (ARNG)
- Fort Sill
- McAlester Army Ammunition Plant

==== Oregon army bases ====
- Camp Rilea (ARNG)
- Camp Withycombe (ARNG)
- Najaf Training Center (ARNG)
- Biak Training Center (ARNG)

==== Pennsylvania army bases ====
- Carlisle Barracks
- Eastern Distribution Center (DLA)
- Fort Indiantown Gap (ARNG)
- Harrisburg Military Post (ARNG)
- Letterkenny Army Depot
- New Cumberland Defense Depot (DLA)
- Tobyhanna Army Depot
- Raven Rock Mountain Complex

==== Puerto Rico army bases ====
- Army National Guard Aviation Support Facility (ARNG)
- Camp Santiago (ARNG)
- Fort Allen (ARNG)
- Fort Buchanan (USAR)

==== Rhode Island army bases ====
- Camp Fogarty (East Greenwich, RI) (ARNG)
- Camp Varnum (ARNG)
- Fort Greene (USAR)

==== South Carolina army bases ====
- Fort Jackson (Army Basic Training Center)
- McEntire Joint National Guard Base (ARNG/ANG)
- Army Aviation Support Facility #2 (ARNG)
- South Carolina National Guard Training Center at Rock Hill
- Clarks Hill Training Center (ARNG)

==== South Dakota army bases ====
- Camp Rapid (ARNG)

==== Tennessee army bases ====
- Fort Campbell
- Holston Army Ammunition Plant
- Milan Army Ammunition Plant (closed)

==== Texas army bases ====
- Camp Bowie (ARNG)
- Camp Mabry (ARNG)
- Camp Maxey (ARNG)
- Camp Swift (part ARNG)
- Corpus Christi Army Depot
- Fort Bliss
- Fort Hood
- Joint Base San Antonio
  - Fort Sam Houston
  - Camp Bullis
  - Camp Stanley
- Fort Wolters (ARNG)
- Martindale Army Airfield (ARNG)
- Red River Army Depot

==== Utah army bases ====
- Camp W. G. Williams (ARNG)
- Dugway Proving Ground
- Fort Douglas (USAR) (closing)
- Tooele Army Depot

==== Vermont army bases ====
- Camp Ethan Allen Training Site (ARNG)
- Camp Johnson (ARNG)

==== Virginia army bases ====
- Camp Pendleton State Military Reservation (ARNG)
- Fort A.P. Hill
- Fort Pickett (ARNG)
- Fort Belvoir
- Fort Eustis, part of Joint Base Langley–Eustis
- Fort Lee
- Fort McNair, part of Joint Base Myer–Henderson Hall
- Fort Myer, part of Joint Base Myer–Henderson Hall
- The Judge Advocate General's Legal Center and School
- National Ground Intelligence Center
- Radford Army Ammunition Plant
- Warrenton Training Center

==== Washington army bases ====
- Camp Murray (ANG/ARNG)
- Fort Lewis, part of Joint Base Lewis–McChord

==== West Virginia army bases ====
- Camp Dawson West Virginia Training Area (ARNG)

==== Wisconsin army bases ====
- Badger Army Ammunition Plant (closing)
- Fort McCoy (USAR)

==== Wyoming army bases ====
- Guernsey Maneuver Area (ARNG)

=== United States Marine Corps ===
==== Arizona Marine bases ====
- MCAS Yuma

==== California Marine bases ====
- Chocolate Mountain Aerial Gunnery Range
- MCLB Barstow
- MCB Camp Pendleton
- MCAS Miramar
- MCRD San Diego
- Mountain Warfare Training Center
- MCAGCC 29 Palms

==== Florida Marine bases ====
- MCSF Blount Island

==== Georgia Marine bases ====
- MCLB Albany

==== Guam and the Northern Mariana Islands Marine bases ====
- Marine Corps Base Camp Blaz, part of Joint Region Marianas

==== Hawaii Marine bases ====
- MCB Hawaii

==== North Carolina Marine bases ====
- MCAS Cherry Point
- MCAS New River
- MCB Camp Lejeune
- Marine Corps Outlying Field Camp Davis

==== South Carolina Marine bases ====
- MCAS Beaufort
- MCRD Parris Island

==== Virginia Marine bases ====
- Henderson Hall
- MCB Quantico

==== Washington, D.C. ====
- Marine Barracks, Washington, D.C.

=== United States Navy ===
==== California naval bases ====
- Naval Auxiliary Landing Field San Clemente Island
- Naval Air Weapons Station China Lake
- Naval Base Coronado
- Naval Air Facility El Centro
- Naval Air Station Lemoore
- Naval Postgraduate School
- Naval Air Station North Island
- Naval Base Point Loma
- Naval Base San Diego
- Naval Base Ventura County
- Naval Outlying Landing Field Imperial Beach
- Naval Amphibious Base Coronado
- Naval Weapons Station Seal Beach
- San Nicolas Island
- Silver Strand Training Complex

==== Connecticut naval bases ====
- Naval Submarine Base New London

==== Florida naval bases ====
- Naval Air Station Jacksonville
- Naval Air Station Key West
- Naval Station Mayport
- Naval Air Warfare Center Training Systems Division
- Naval Support Activity Panama City
- Naval Air Station Pensacola
- Naval Air Station Whiting Field

==== Georgia naval bases ====
- Naval Submarine Base Kings Bay

==== Guam naval bases ====
- Naval Base Guam, part of Joint Region Marianas

==== Hawaii naval bases ====
- Pacific Missile Range Facility
- Pearl Harbor Naval Base
- NCTAMS Naval Station

==== Illinois naval bases ====
- Naval Station Great Lakes

==== Indiana naval bases ====
- Naval Surface Warfare Center Crane Division

==== Louisiana naval bases ====
- Naval Air Station Joint Reserve Base New Orleans

==== Maine naval bases ====
- Portsmouth Naval Shipyard

==== Maryland naval bases ====
- Naval Support Activity Annapolis
- Naval Air Station Patuxent River
- Naval Support Facility Thurmont
- United States Naval Academy
- Indian Head Naval Surface Warfare Center
- Naval Support Activity Bethesda
- Naval Outlying Field Webster
- Stump Neck Annex

==== Mississippi naval bases ====
- Naval Construction Battalion Center
- Naval Air Station Meridian

==== Nevada naval bases ====
- Fallon Range Training Complex
- Naval Air Station Fallon

==== New Jersey naval bases ====
- NWS Earle
- Naval Support Activity Lakehurst, part of Joint Base McGuire–Dix–Lakehurst

==== New York naval bases ====
- Naval Support Facility Saratoga Springs

==== North Dakota naval bases ====
- Naval Radio Transmitter Facility LaMoure

==== Oregon naval bases ====
- Naval Weapons Systems Training Facility Boardman

==== Pennsylvania naval bases ====
- Naval Inactive Ship Maintenance Facility - Philadelphia Naval Shipyard
- Naval Support Activity Mechanicsburg

==== Puerto Rico naval bases ====
- Roosevelt Roads Naval Station
- Naval Radio Transmitter Facility Aguada

==== Rhode Island naval bases ====
- NS Newport

==== South Carolina naval bases ====
- Naval Support Activity Charleston

==== Tennessee naval bases ====
- Naval Support Activity Mid-South

==== Texas naval bases ====
- Dixie Target Range
- Naval Air Station Corpus Christi
- Naval Air Station Joint Reserve Base Fort Worth
- Naval Air Station Kingsville
- Naval Outlying Field Goliad

==== Virginia naval bases ====
- Naval Support Facility Arlington
- Naval Support Activity South Potomac
- Naval Station Norfolk
- Naval Surface Warfare Center Dahlgren Division
- Naval Air Station Oceana
- Surface Combat Systems Center Wallops Island
- Naval Weapons Station Yorktown
- Norfolk Naval Shipyard

==== Washington naval bases ====
- Naval Air Station Whidbey Island
- Naval Base Kitsap
- Naval Magazine Indian Island
- Naval Outlying Landing Field Coupeville
- Naval Station Everett

==== Washington, D.C. naval bases ====
- Washington Navy Yard
- United States Naval Research Laboratory

=== United States Air Force ===
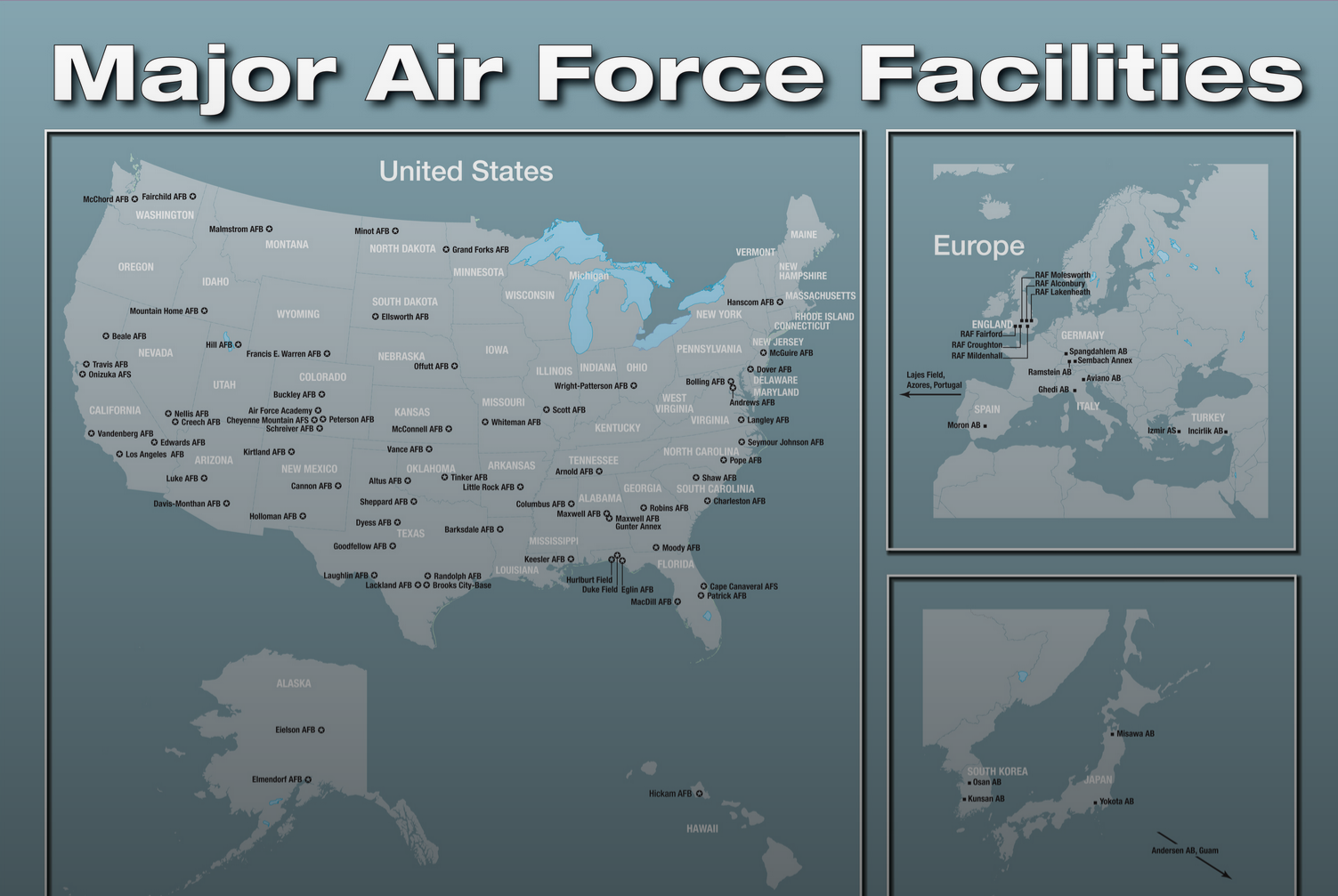
Maps of the main bases of the USAF in the 2010s, before the transfer of several sites to the USSF.

==== Alabama air force bases ====
- Maxwell Air Force Base
- Sumpter Smith Air National Guard Base
- Montgomery Air National Guard Base

==== Alaska air force bases ====
- Eielson Air Force Base
- Elmendorf Air Force Base

==== Arizona air force bases ====
- Barry M. Goldwater Air Force Range
- Davis–Monthan Air Force Base
- Goldwater Air National Guard Base
- Luke Air Force Base

==== Arkansas air force bases ====
- Ebbing Air National Guard Base
- Little Rock Air Force Base

==== California air force bases ====
- Beale Air Force Base
- Edwards Air Force Base
- Los Angeles Air Force Base
- March Air Reserve Base
- Travis Air Force Base

==== Colorado air force bases ====
- United States Air Force Academy

==== Connecticut air force bases ====
- Bradley International Airport - 103rd Airlift Wing

==== Delaware air force bases ====
- Dover Air Force Base
- New Castle Air National Guard Base - Wilmington Airport

==== Florida air force bases ====
- Avon Park Air Force Range
- Eglin Air Force Base
- Homestead Air Reserve Base
- Hurlburt Field
- MacDill Air Force Base
- Tyndall Air Force Base

==== Georgia air force bases ====
- Dobbins Air Reserve Base
- Moody Air Force Base
- Robins Air Force Base

==== Guam air force bases ====
- Andersen Air Force Base, part of Joint Region Marianas

==== Hawaii air force bases ====
- Barking Sands AFB
- Bellows Air Force Station
- Hickam AFB
- Keaukaha Military Reservation

==== Idaho air force bases ====
- Mountain Home Air Force Base
- Saylor Creek Air Force Range

==== Illinois air force bases ====
- Peoria Air National Guard Base
- Scott Air Force Base

==== Indiana air force bases ====
- Grissom Joint Air Reserve Base
- Fort Wayne Air National Guard Base
- Hulman Field Air National Guard Base

==== Iowa ====
- Sioux City Air National Guard Base

==== Kansas air force bases ====
- McConnell Air Force Base

==== Kentucky air force bases ====
- Louisville Air National Guard Base

==== Louisiana air force bases ====
- Barksdale Air Force Base
- Esler Airfield
- New Orleans Joint Reserve Base

==== Maryland air force bases ====
- Andrews Air Force Base, part of Joint Base Andrews

==== Massachusetts air force bases ====
- Barnes Air National Guard Base
- Hanscom Air Force Base
- Otis Air National Guard Base
- Westover Joint Air Reserve Base

==== Michigan air force bases ====
- Selfridge Air National Guard Base

==== Minnesota air force bases ====
- Duluth Air National Guard Base
- Minneapolis–Saint Paul Joint Air Reserve Station

==== Mississippi air force bases ====
- Columbus Air Force Base
- Gulfport Combat Readiness Training Center
- Keesler Air Force Base

==== Missouri air force bases ====
- Rosecrans Air National Guard Base
- Whiteman Air Force Base

==== Montana air force bases ====
- Malmstrom Air Force Base

==== Nebraska air force bases ====
- Offutt Air Force Base
- Lincoln Air National Guard Base

==== Nevada air force bases ====
- Creech Air Force Base
- Nellis Air Force Base
- Reno Air National Guard Base
- Area 51
- Tonopah Test Range

==== New Hampshire air force bases ====
- Pease Air National Guard Base

==== New Jersey air force bases ====
- McGuire Air Force Base, part of Joint Base McGuire–Dix–Lakehurst
- Atlantic City Air National Guard Base

==== New Mexico air force bases ====
- Cannon Air Force Base
- Holloman Air Force Base
- Kirtland Air Force Base
- Melrose Air Force Range

==== New York air force bases ====
- Francis S. Gabreski Air National Guard Base
- Hancock Field Air National Guard Base
- Niagara Falls Air Reserve Station
- Stewart Air National Guard Base
- Stratton Air National Guard Base

==== North Carolina air force bases ====
- Pope Air Force Base
- Seymour Johnson Air Force Base

==== North Dakota air force bases ====
- Grand Forks Air Force Base
- Minot Air Force Base

==== Ohio air force bases ====
- Mansfield Lahm Air National Guard Base
- Rickenbacker Air National Guard Base
- Toledo Air National Guard Base
- Wright-Patterson Air Force Base

==== Oklahoma air force bases ====
- Altus Air Force Base
- Kegelman Air Force Auxiliary Field
- Tinker Air Force Base
- Vance Air Force Base

==== Oregon air force bases ====
- Kingsley Field Air National Guard Base
- Portland Air National Guard Base

==== Pennsylvania air force bases ====
- Biddle Air National Guard Base
- Harrisburg Air National Guard Base

==== Puerto Rico air force bases ====
- Muñiz Air National Guard Base

==== Rhode Island air force bases ====
- Quonset Point Air National Guard Station

==== South Carolina air force bases ====
- Charleston Air Force Base
- McEntire Joint National Guard Base
- Shaw Air Force Base

==== South Dakota air force bases ====
- Ellsworth Air Force Base
- Joe Foss Field Air National Guard Station

==== Tennessee air force bases ====
- Arnold Air Force Base
- Joint Base Berry Field - Nashville International Airport
- McGhee Tyson Air National Guard Base
- Memphis Air National Guard Base - 164th Airlift Wing

==== Texas air force bases ====
- Dyess Air Force Base
- Ellington Field Joint Reserve Base
- Goodfellow Air Force Base
- Lackland Air Force Base
- Laughlin Air Force Base
- Randolph Air Force Base
- Sheppard Air Force Base

==== Vermont air force bases ====
- Burlington Air National Guard

==== Utah air force bases ====
- Hill Air Force Base
- Salt Lake City Air National Guard Base
- Utah Test and Training Range

==== Virginia air force bases ====
- Langley Air Force Base

==== Washington air force bases ====
- Fairchild Air Force Base
- McChord AFB, part of Joint Base Lewis–McChord

==== Washington, D.C., air force bases ====
- Bolling Air Force Base

==== West Virginia air force bases ====
- McLaughlin Air National Guard Base - Yeager Airport
- Shepherd Field Air National Guard Base

==== Wisconsin air force bases ====
- Milwaukee Mitchell IAP
- Truax Field Air National Guard Base
- Volk Field Air National Guard Base
- Hardwood air-to-ground weapons range

==== Wyoming air force bases ====
- Francis E. Warren Air Force Base

=== United States Space Force ===
==== Alaska space force bases ====
- Clear Space Force Station, Alaska

==== California space force bases ====
- Los Angeles Air Force Base, California
- Vandenberg Space Force Base, California

==== Colorado space force bases ====
- Buckley Space Force Base, Colorado
- Cheyenne Mountain Space Force Station, Colorado
- Peterson Space Force Base, Colorado
- Schriever Space Force Base, Colorado

==== Florida space force bases ====
- Cape Canaveral Space Force Station, Florida
- Patrick Space Force Base, Florida

==== Hawaii space force bases ====
- Kaena Point Space Force Station, Hawaii

==== Massachusetts space force bases ====
- Cape Cod Space Force Station, Massachusetts

==== New Hampshire space force bases ====
- New Boston Space Force Station, New Hampshire

==== North Dakota space force bases ====
- Cavalier Space Force Station, North Dakota

== Foreign bases and facilities ==
=== Australia ===
- Australian Defence Satellite Communications Station – joint Australian-US base near Kojarena, Western Australia
- Naval Communication Station Harold E. Holt – joint Australian-US naval communication station near Exmouth, Western Australia.
- Pine Gap – joint Australian-US facility near Alice Springs, Northern Territory.
- Robertson Barracks – Australian Army base that hosts Marine Rotational Force – Darwin – located in Darwin, Northern Territory.
- Other U.S. bases in Australia are present and this list does not include ADF bases with U.S. access. The U.S. military has access to many ADF training areas, northern Australian RAAF airfields, port facilities in Darwin, Fremantle, Stirling naval base in Perth, and the airfield on the Cocos Islands in the Indian Ocean.

=== Bahamas ===
- Atlantic Undersea Test and Evaluation Center

=== Bahrain ===
- Naval Support Activity Bahrain – HQ of United States Fifth Fleet and Patrol Forces Southwest Asia

=== Belgium ===
- Chièvres Air Base – NATO airbase operated by the US Air Force and US Army

=== Bulgaria ===
- Aytos Logistics Center – joint Bulgarian-US facility in Burgas Province
- Bezmer Air Base – joint Bulgarian-US base in Yambol Province
- Graf Ignatievo Air Base – joint Bulgarian-US base in Plovdiv Province
- Novo Selo Range – joint Bulgarian-US military training area in Sliven Province

=== Cameroon ===
- Contingency Location Garoua, Garoua

=== Canada ===
- CFB North Bay – joint Canadian-US base

=== Cuba ===
- Guantanamo Bay Naval Base

=== Djibouti ===
- Camp Lemonnier

=== Germany ===
- NATO Air Base Geilenkirchen
- Buchel Air base
- Dagger Complex, Darmstadt Training Center Griesheim
- Grafenwöhr Training Area, Grafenwöhr/Vilseck
- Hohenfels Training Area/Joint Multinational Readiness Center, Hohenfels (Upper Palatinate)
- Kaiserslautern Military Community
- Katterbach Kaserne, Ansbach
- Kelley Barracks, Stuttgart
- Lucius D. Clay Kaserne (formerly Wiesbaden Army Airfield), Wiesbaden-Erbenheim
- Landstuhl Regional Medical Center, Landstuhl
- Maritime & International Law-U.S. Africa Command
- Panzer Kaserne, Böblingen
- Patch Barracks, Stuttgart
- Ramstein Air Base
- Robinson Barracks, Stuttgart
- Sembach Kaserne, Kaiserslautern
- Shipton Kaserne, Ansbach
- Spangdahlem Air Base
- Storck Barracks, Illesheim

=== Greece ===
- Crete Naval Base – Greek Navy and NATO naval base that hosts US Navy ships

=== Greenland (Denmark) ===
- Pituffik Space Base

=== Honduras ===
- Soto Cano Air Base – Honduran Air Force base that hosts the US Joint Task Force Bravo

=== Israel ===
- Dimona Radar Facility
- Site 512

=== Italy ===
- Aviano Air Base – Italian Air Force base that hosts the US Air Force 31st Fighter Wing
- Caserma Ederle and Camp Darby – joint Italian-US base
- Naval Support Activity Naples – HQ of the United States Sixth Fleet
- Sigonella Naval Air Station – joint Italian-US base

=== Japan ===
- Camp Zama
- Fort Buckner
- Kadena Air Base, Okinawa Prefecture
- Kanoya Air Field, Kagoshima Prefecture
- Misawa Air Base, Misawa, Aomori
- Marine Corps Air Station Futenma, Okinawa
- Marine Corps Air Station Iwakuni, Yamaguchi Prefecture
- Marine Corps Base Camp Smedley D. Butler, Okinawa (Note: the following camps are dispersed throughout Okinawa but are all under the administration of the MCB complex.)
  - Camp Courtney
  - Camp Fuji, Shizuoka Prefecture
  - Camp Foster
  - Camp Gonsalves (Jungle Warfare Training Center)
  - Camp Hansen
  - Camp Kinser
  - Camp McTureous
  - Camp Schwab
  - Camp Shields
- Naval Air Facility Atsugi
- Naval Forces Japan, Okinawa
- Sagami General Depot
- U.S. Army Garrison Okinawa
- United States Fleet Activities Sasebo
- United States Fleet Activities Yokosuka
- Yokota Air Base, Tokyo

=== Jordan ===
- Muwaffaq Salti Air Base, Azraq – Royal Jordanian Air Force base that hosts the US Air Force
- Tower 22 outpost, Rukban

=== Kenya ===
- Camp Simba

=== Kosovo ===
- Camp Bondsteel – base of Kosovo Force, a peacekeeping force led by the US Army

=== Kuwait ===
- Camp Arifjan
- Camp Buehring (formerly Camp Udairi)
- Camp Patriot (shared with Kuwait Naval Base)
- Ahmad al-Jaber Air Base – joint Kuwaiti-US base
- Ali Al Salem Air Base – Kuwait Air Force base that hosts the US Air Force

=== Marshall Islands ===
- Bucholz Army Airfield

=== Netherlands ===
- USCG Activities Europe
- Volkel Air Base – Royal Netherlands Air and Space Force base that hosts the US 703rd Munitions Support Squadron.

=== Poland ===
- Camp Kościuszko – HQ of the US V Corps
- 33rd Air Base, Powidz – Polish Air Force that stores US equipment
- Łask Air Base – Polish Air Force that hosts the US Air Force
- Redzikowo missile defense complex – NATO missile defense system operated by the US military

=== Portugal ===
- Lajes Air Base – Portuguese Air Force base that hosts United States Forces Azores

=== Qatar ===
- Al Udeid Air Base – joint Qatari-US base

=== Romania ===
- Câmpia Turzii Air Base – Romanian Air Force base that hosts the US 731st Expeditionary Attack Squadron
- Deveselu Military Base – Romanian NATO base that hosts the US Naval Support Facility Deveselu and the Aegis Ashore Defense System Romania
- Mihail Kogălniceanu Air Base – joint Romanian-US base, location of U.S. Army Garrison Black Sea and Area Support Group Black Sea

=== Saudi Arabia ===
- Saudi Maritime Infrastructure Protection Force
- Prince Sultan Air Base

=== Singapore ===
- Changi Air Base – joint Singapore-US base
- Changi Naval Base – Republic of Singapore Navy base that hosts the US Navy

=== South Korea ===
- Busan Naval Base
- Camp Mujuk
- Commander Fleet Activities Chinhae
- Kunsan Air Base
- Osan Air Base - joint South Korean-US base

=== Spain ===
- Morón Air Base – joint Spanish-US base
- Naval Station Rota – joint Spanish-US base

=== Turkey ===
- Incirlik Air Base – joint Turkish-US base
- Izmir Air Station
- Kürecik Radar Station – NATO radar station operated by the US Army

=== United Arab Emirates ===
- Al Dhafra Air Base – United Arab Emirates Air Force base that hosts the US military

=== United Kingdom ===
- RAF Alconbury, Huntingdonshire
- RAF Croughton, Northamptonshire
- RAF Fairford, Gloucestershire
- RAF Lakenheath, Brandon, Suffolk
- RAF Mildenhall, Mildenhall, Suffolk
- RAF Molesworth, Cambridgeshire

British overseas territories

- Ascension Island Auxiliary Airfield – joint UK-US base

=== Contested Territory (Mauritius / UK) ===
- Naval Support Facility Diego Garcia – joint UK-US base

== See also ==
- List of countries with overseas military bases
- Base Realignment and Closure
- United States military deployments
- List of United States drone bases
- Lists of military installations
- American imperialism
- List of wars involving the United States
- Piardoba Airfield

== Sources ==
- "List of U.S. Bases Across the World". militarybases.com.
