= NAVCOMMSTA =

NAVCOMMSTA may refer to any of several military installations:

== US Navy ==
- Naval Computer and Telecommunications Area Master Station Pacific, in Hawaii
- Naval Computer and Telecommunications Station Naples, Italy
- NAVCOMMSTA Diego Garcia
- NAVCOMMSTA Puerto Rico at Fort Allen, Puerto Rico
- NAVCOMSTAPHIL, United States Naval Communications Station San Miguel, Philippines

== Royal Australian Navy ==
- NAVCOMMSTA Canberra at HMAS Harman
