= Naval Support Activity Naples =

US Navy complex in Italy

- Capodichino, Naples, Campania in Italy
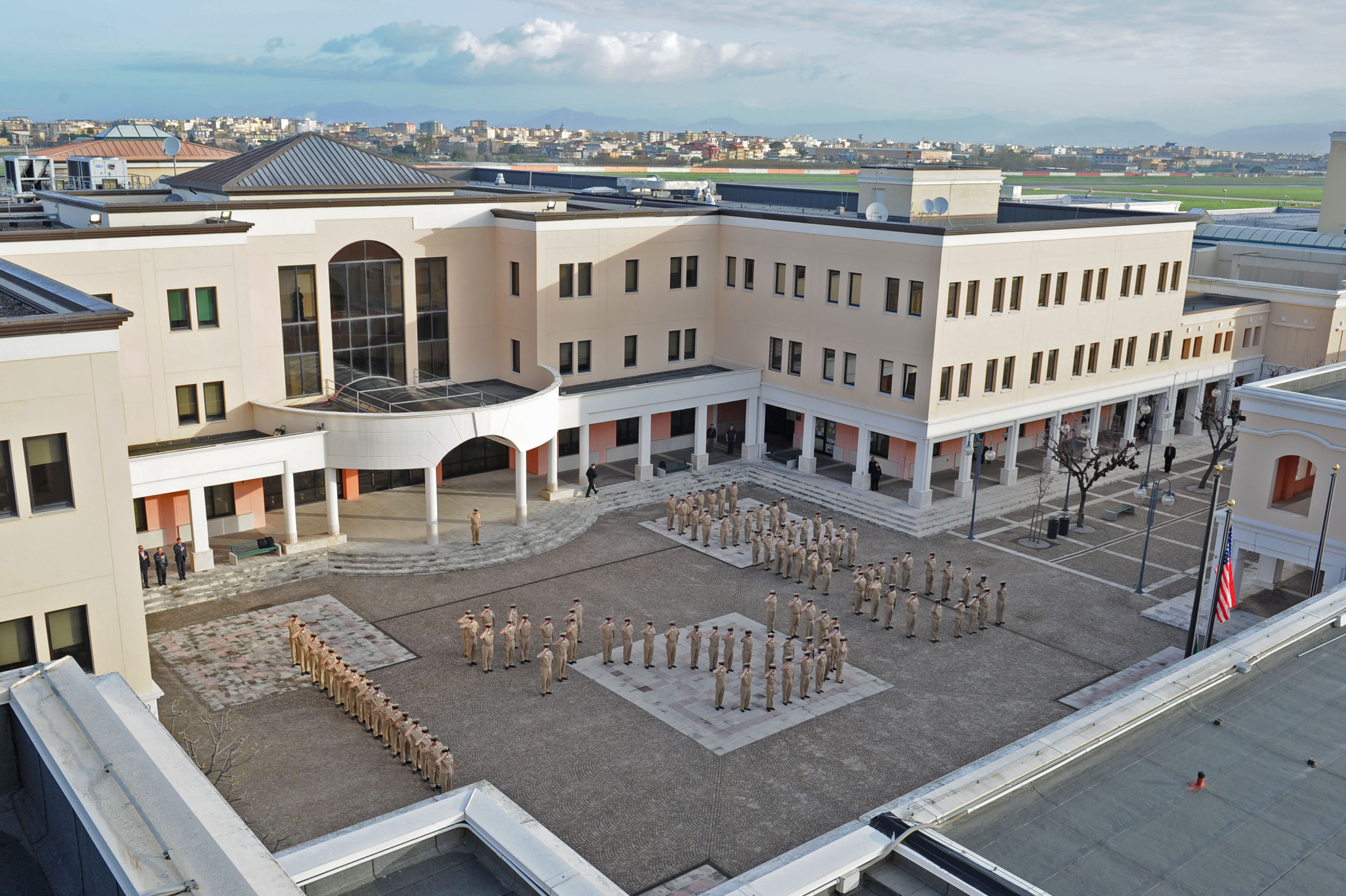
- A parade at NSA Naples in 2013

Site information
- Type: Naval Support Activity
- Owner: Italian Ministry of Defence
- Operator: US Navy
- Controlled by: Commander, Navy Region Europe, Africa, Central
- Condition: Operational
- Website: Official website

Location
- Location in Italy
- Coordinates: 40°52′56.6″N 14°17′32.5″E

Site history
- Built: 1951
- In use: 1951 – present

Naval Support Activity Naples (NSA Naples) is a United States Navy military complex, located adjacent to Naples International Airport in Capodichino, Naples, Italy.

The Activity is under Italian military control and can be managed anytime by Italian authorities. It is home to U.S. Naval Forces Europe and Africa and the U.S. Sixth Fleet.

== History ==
On October 3, 1951, the naval ashore unit Headquarters, Support Activities was created to support Allied Forces Southern Europe, and later the Sixth Fleet. In August, 1953, the support unit became Commander, Subordinate command, U.S. Naval Forces Eastern Atlantic / Commander, Headquarters Support Activities, and re-designated U.S. Naval Activities, Italy / U.S. Naval Support Activity, Naples in November 1957. U.S. Naval Activities, Italy was consolidated with U.S. Naval Support Activity, Naples on August 8, 1966.

Naval Hospital Naples was established at Agnano in 1967, and moved to Gricignano di Aversa in April 2003. In 2005 the United States Naval Forces Europe headquarters moved from London to Naples. Naval Support Activity Gaeta, established in 1967, became a detachment of NSA Naples on February 10, 2006.

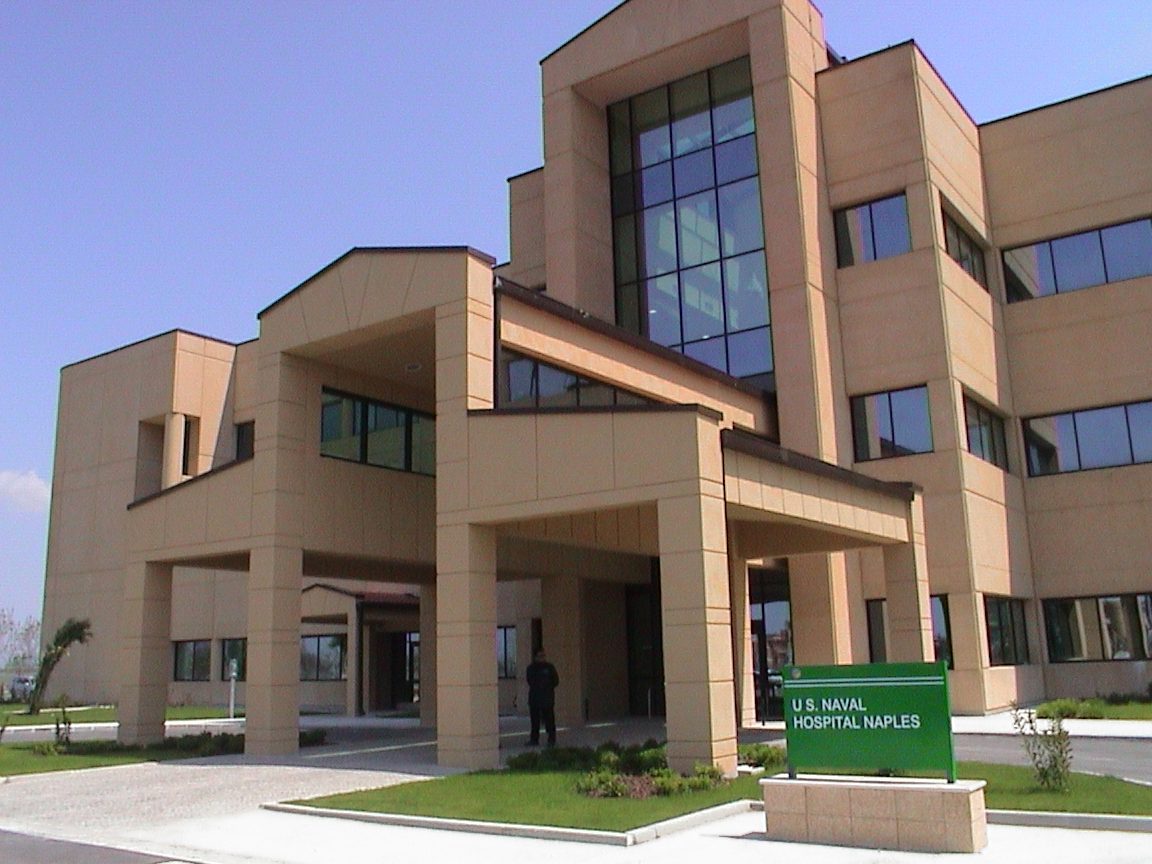
Naval Hospital Naples in 2003

Beginning in the 1990s, the Naval Computer and Telecommunications Station Naples (NCTS Naples) is located at the Activity.

== See also ==
- Carney Park
- Naval Computer and Telecommunications Station Naples, Italy
- United States Navy submarine bases
- World War II United States Merchant Navy
