= Wendell H. Ford Regional Training Center =

Coordinates: 37.257°N 87.209°W

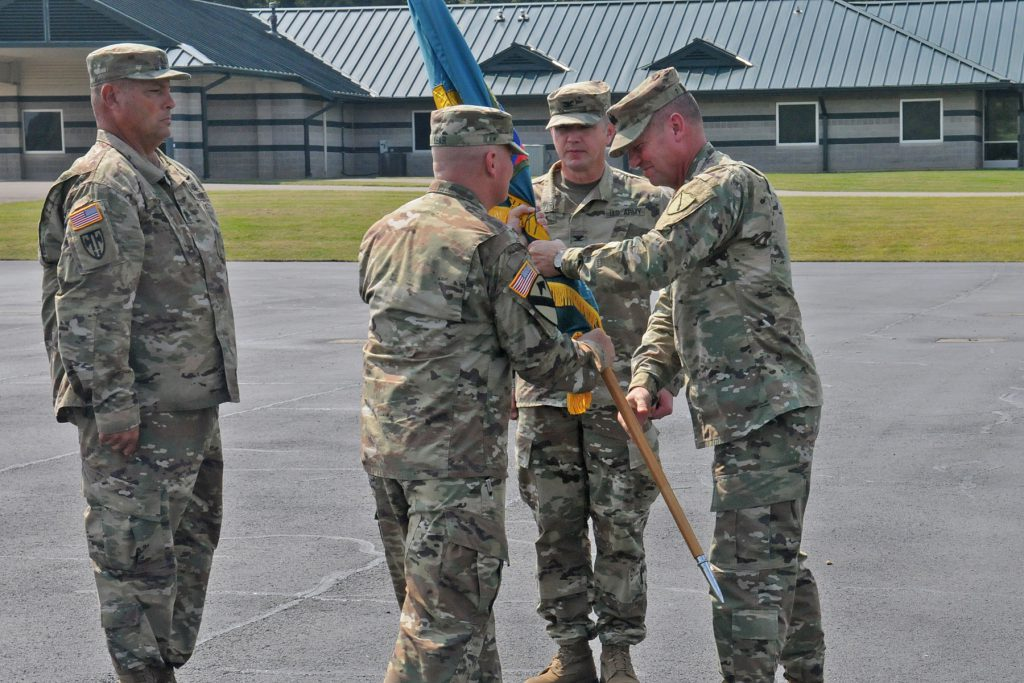
Lt. Col. Joe Lear, assuming command of the training center, Sept. 16, 2017

The Wendell H. Ford Regional Training Center (WHFRTC) is a training ground located near Greenville in Muhlenberg County, Kentucky, and is the primary training center for the Kentucky National Guard. Named for Wendell Ford, U.S. Senator and 53rd Governor of Kentucky, the site began in 1969 with 29 acres (12 ha), and as of 2017 encompassed 11,241 acres (4,549 ha) of reclaimed strip mining land.

The facility was dedicated on October 17, 1997. Prior to the establishment of WHFRTC, the majority of the land was managed by Peabody Coal Company.

As of September 16, 2017 the installation is commanded by Lieutenant Colonel Joe Lear, with Command Sergeant Major Keith Cox as the ranking enlisted soldier. The center serves as a training location for an average of 70,000 personnel per year.

== Training programs ==
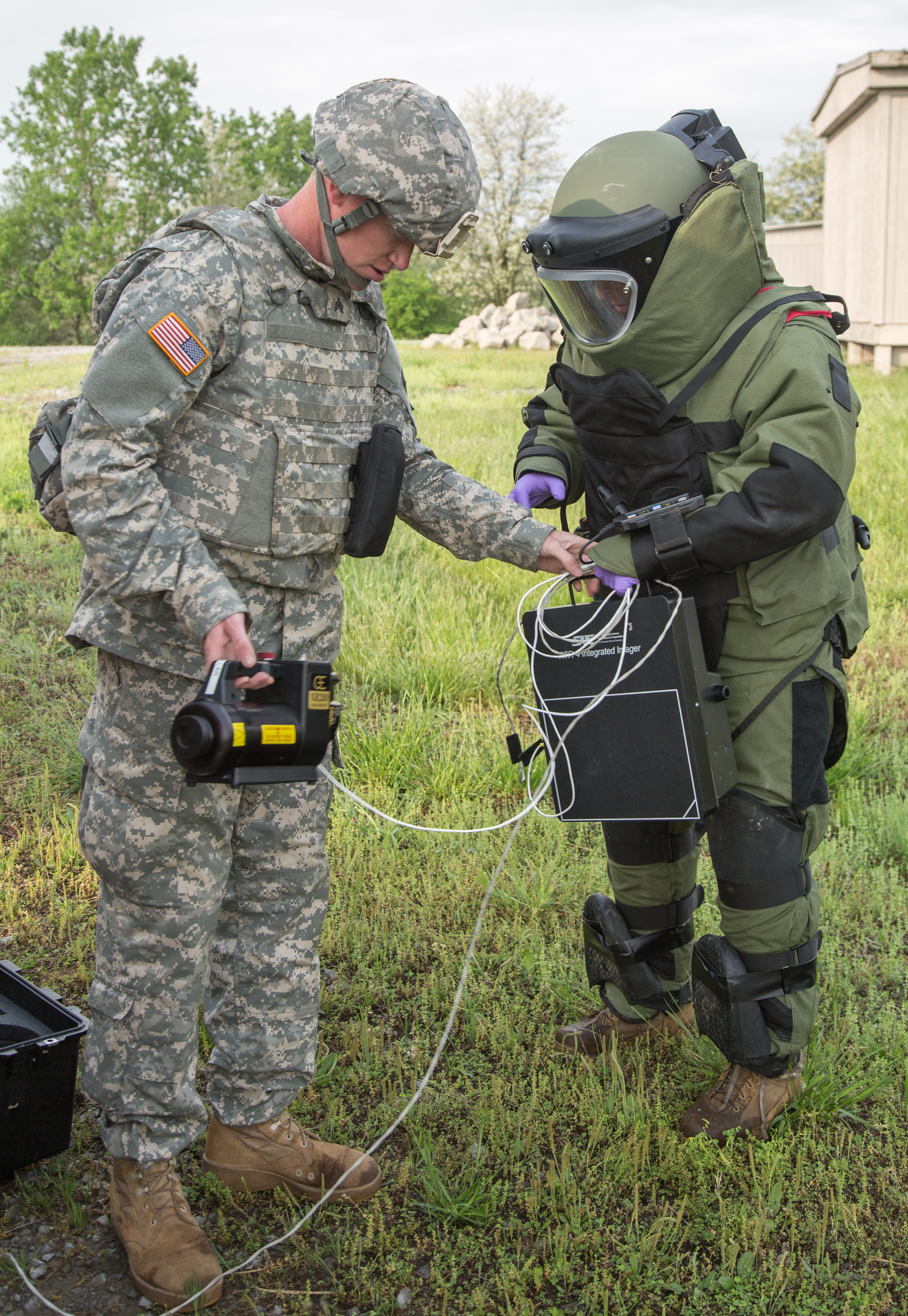
Soldiers of the 666th Ordnance Co (EOD), Alabama Army National Guard at the 2016 52nd Ordnance Group (EOD) Team of the Year competition at WHFRTC

WHFRTC has a history of hosting a number of training programs for both military and civilian personnel, including:

- 807th Medical Command, Best Warrior competition
- American Legion Kentucky Boys State Program (Note: Discontinued as of 2016.)
- Exportable Combat Training Capability Exercise (2005)
- Kentucky National Guard Officer Candidate School
- Kentucky National Guard Warrant Officer Candidate School
- 52nd Ordnance Group (EOD) Team of the Year competition (2016)
- Kentucky Army National Guard Best Warrior competition

Additionally, WHFRTC is home to the National Responder Preparedness Center, a joint training mission with the Kentucky State Fire Commission, which opened in 2013. WHFRTC was also used as a regional support area during the August 2017 lunar eclipse.

== Facilities ==
- Barracks for almost 500
- Dining facility with seating for 400
- Computer simulated training facility
- Live fire weapons ranges
- Hardened bivouac sites
- Controlled humidity storage complex
- Obstacle course
- 4,200 ft. grass runway
- Equipment maintenance facilities
- Drill hall

== See also ==
- List of United States military bases
- National Guard of the United States
- United States Army Reserve
