= Navy Region Mid-Atlantic =

One of eleven naval regions of the U.S. Navy

Coordinates: 36.9486°N 76.3084°W

Commander, Navy Region Mid-Atlantic Navy Region Mid-Atlantic
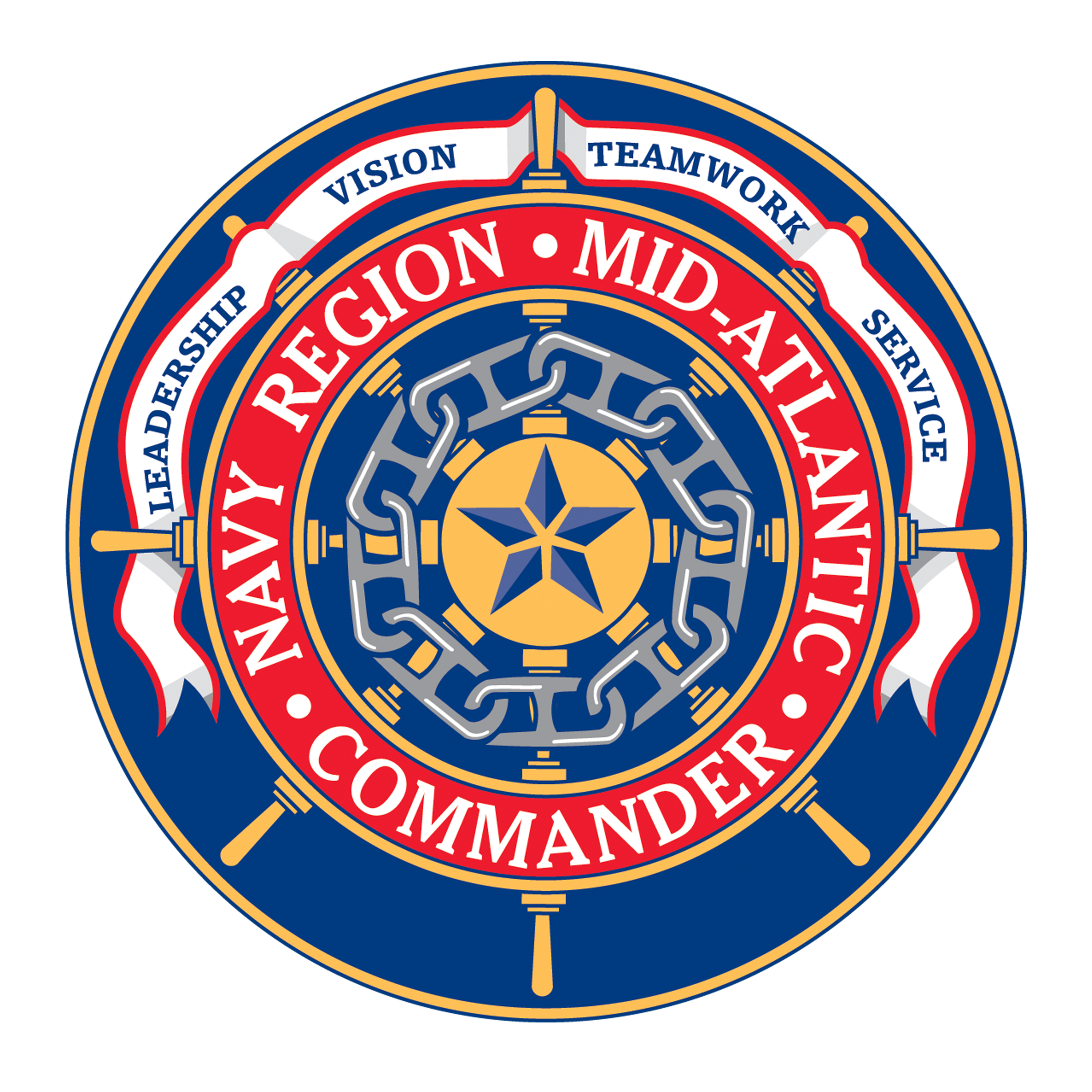
- Command insignia of CNRMA
- Founded: 1999; 27 years ago
- Country: United States
- Branch: United States Navy
- Type: Region Commander
- Role: Management of installations in twenty states
- Part of: Naval Installations Command
- Headquartered: Naval Station Norfolk
- Nickname: CNRMA
- Website: cnrma.cnic.navy.mil

Commanders
- Current commander: RADM Stephen D. Barnett

Navy Region Mid-Atlantic is one of eleven current naval regions responsible to Commander, Navy Installations Command for the operation and management of Naval shore installations in Wisconsin, Illinois, Michigan, Indiana, Ohio, Kentucky, North Carolina, Virginia, West Virginia, Maryland, Delaware, Pennsylvania, New Jersey, New York, Connecticut, Rhode Island, Massachusetts, Vermont, New Hampshire, and Maine.

It is headquartered on Naval Station Norfolk, and is commanded by RADM Carl A. Lahti.

== History of the region ==
Navy Region Mid-Atlantic was formed from the former territories of the First, Second, Third, Fourth, and Fifth Naval Districts.

=== First Naval District ===
The boundaries of the First Naval District, headquartered at Portsmouth Navy Yard in Kittery, Maine, (and later in Boston, Massachusetts), were established on 7 May 1903 in accordance with General Order No. 128, signed by Acting Secretary of the Navy Charles H. Darling. Until late 1915, no personnel were assigned to the district staff. In 1945 the district was headquartered at Boston and consisted of the following geographic areas: Maine, New Hampshire, Vermont, Massachusetts, and Rhode Island (including Block Island). The First Naval District was disestablished on 7 October 1976. Its area was passed onto the Fourth Naval District.

=== Second Naval District ===
Created with the other original districts in 1903, the Second Naval District was the smallest district. It was headquartered in Newport, Rhode Island, and covered only Rhode Island and adjacent waters. It was disestablished and its areas incorporated into the First and Third Districts on March 15, 1919, after the end of World War I.

=== Third Naval District ===
The Third Naval District, headquartered at New York City, was established on 7 May 1903 in accordance with General Order No. 128, signed by Acting Secretary of the Navy Charles H. Darling. Puerto Rico was initially part of the district, due to good communications between New York and Puerto Rico. In 1919 Puerto Rico was removed from the district and placed directly under the control of the chief of naval operations. In 1945 the district, still headquartered at New York, consisted of the following geographic areas: Connecticut, New York, the northern part of New Jersey (including the counties of Mercer and Monmouth, and all counties north thereof), and also the Nantucket Shoals Lightship. The Third Naval District was disestablished on 7 October 1976 and functions were transferred to the Fourth Naval District.

=== Fourth Naval District ===
The boundaries of the Fourth Naval District, to be headquartered at League Island Navy Yard in Philadelphia, Pennsylvania, were established on 7 May 1903 in accordance with General Order No. 128, signed by Acting Secretary of the Navy Charles H. Darling. No personnel were assigned to the district staff until late 1915. In 1945 the district, still headquartered in Philadelphia, consisted of the following geographic areas: Pennsylvania, the southern part of New Jersey (including the counties of Burlington and Ocean, and all counties south thereof), and Delaware (including Winter Quarters Shoal Light Vessel). On 7 October 1976 this command absorbed the functions of the First and Third Naval Districts. The Fourth Naval District was disestablished on 30 September 1980.

=== Fifth Naval District ===
The boundaries of the Fifth Naval District, to be headquartered at the Norfolk Navy Yard in Norfolk, Virginia, were established on 7 May 1903 in accordance with General Order No. 128, signed by Acting Secretary of the Navy Charles H. Darling. Until late 1915 no personnel were assigned to the district staff. In 1945 the district was headquartered at the Naval Operating Base at Norfolk, Virginia, and consisted of the following geographic areas: Maryland less Anne Arundel, Prince Georges, Montgomery, St. Mary's, Calvert, and Charles counties; West Virginia; Virginia less Arlington, Fairfax, Stafford, King George, Prince William, and Westmoreland counties; and the Counties of Currituck, Camden, Pasquotank, Gates, Perquimans, Chowan, Tyrrell, Washington, Hyde, Beaufort, Pamlico, Craven, Jones, Carteret, Onslow, and Dare in North Carolina; also the Diamond Shoals Lightship. The Fifth Naval District was disestablished on 30 September 1980.

== Current Subordinate Commands ==
Navy Region Mid-Atlantic (USA Midwest and Northeast)

Navy Region Mid-Atlantic operates the following installations:

- Naval Station Norfolk (headquarters)
- Naval Air Station Oceana
  - Dam Neck Annex
- Joint Expeditionary Base Little Creek–Fort Story
  - Naval Surface Combat Systems Center Wallops Island
- Naval Submarine Base New London
  - Naval Support Facility Saratoga Springs
- Naval Support Activity Mechanicsburg
  - Naval Support Activity Philadelphia
- Naval Station Great Lakes
- Naval Station Newport
- Naval Support Activity Crane
- Naval Support Activity Hampton Roads
- Naval Support Activity Lakehurst
- Naval Weapons Station Earle
- Naval Weapons Station Yorktown
- Norfolk Naval Shipyard
- Portsmouth Naval Shipyard
