= Robert Carney =

United States Navy admiral

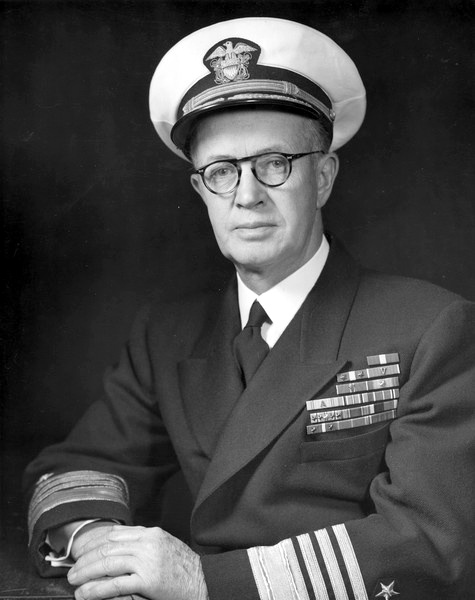
- Born: March 26, 1895; Vallejo, California, U.S.
- Died: June 25, 1990 (aged 95); Washington, D.C., U.S.
- Burial place: Arlington National Cemetery
- Relatives: Robert B. Carney Jr. (son)
- Military career
- Branch: United States Navy
- Service years: 1916–1955
- Rank: Admiral
- Nickname: "Mick"
- Commands: Chief of Naval Operations; Allied Forces Southern Europe; United States Second Fleet; USS Denver
- Conflicts: World War I; World War II; Solomon Islands campaign; Battle of Peleliu; Formosa Air Battle; Philippines campaign (1944–1945); Battle of Leyte Gulf; Invasion of Lingayen Gulf; Battle of Okinawa; Attacks on Kure and the Seto Inland Sea; Allied naval bombardments of Japan during World War II
- Awards: Navy Cross; Navy Distinguished Service Medal (4); Legion of Merit; Bronze Star Medal
- Other work: Chairman of the Board, Bath Iron Works

Robert Bostwick Carney (March 26, 1895 – June 25, 1990) was an admiral in the United States Navy who served as commander-in-chief of the NATO forces in Southern Europe (1951–1953) and then as Chief of Naval Operations (1953–1954) during the Eisenhower administration. He was the father in law of Joseph K. Taussig Jr.

== Early years ==
Born in Vallejo, California, Carney graduated from the United States Naval Academy in 1916. He served in World War I, seeing combat against German U-boats.

== Between wars ==
Carney served as Flag Secretary to Admiral Louis R. de Steiguer during the mid-1920s during de Steiguer's time in command of various battleship forces. Their relationship was not happy, mainly due to de Steiguer's imperious manner described by Carney as "constant pressure, irascibility, criticism, and unpleasantness".

Famously, Carney eventually marched into de Steiguer's cabin, snapped, "Admiral, I just want to tell you I think you are a goddamn rotten son of a bitch," and stormed out. After failing to retrieve Carney with a Marine orderly, de Steiguer visited Carney's cabin in person, and said "Sonny, you've been working too hard. You and I are going ashore." He then took Carney on an drinking binge. Carney ultimately concluded that his three years with de Steiguer had been a valuable experience, but not one he would have chosen to repeat.

== World War II ==
In February 1941, then Commander Carney was recalled from duty in the Pacific to assist in organizing, equipping, and training a special Surface-Air Force, having as its mission the protection of shipping against submarine and air attack. This force became fully involved in convoy escort prior to the involvement of the United States into the war. From September 13, 1941, until April 1942, this force, under command of Vice Admiral Arthur L. Bristol, Jr., escorted over 2,600 ships on the ocean lanes while suffering the loss of only six ships.

From October 15, 1942, until July 1943 Carney commanded the cruiser USS Denver in the Pacific Theater. He was twice decorated for engagements in the Solomon Islands campaign, earning the Bronze Star Medal with Combat "V" for meritorious service as Commanding Officer of Denver while attached to a task group of Admiral William Halsey's Third Fleet during operations against the Japanese-held islands of Kolombangara and Shortland. Off Bougainville the night of July 26, 1943 he took advantage of poor weather to lay a large quantity of mines along sea lanes around the island, and then delivered a naval bombardment against the Japanese shore installations.

On July 29, 1943, Carney was appointed chief of staff to Halsey, and was promoted to rear admiral. At the time Halsey was Commander, South Pacific Force, a responsibility which included all ground, sea, and air forces in the South Pacific area. Carney later wrote that "Admiral Halsey unfailingly gave credit to his subordinates for successes achieved, and took all blame for failures on his own shoulders." While in this assignment, Carney was awarded his second Navy Distinguished Service Medal for his contributions to the overall strategy and in organizing the logistic support of the Allied Forces in the South Pacific, the citation stating, in part:

Displaying sound judgement and distinctive tactical ability, he conceived and correlated the many offensive operations carried out in the Solomon Islands and Bismarck Archipelago areas. Through his comprehensive knowledge of logistics and his expert planning, he enabled our Forces to exert their greatest strength against the enemy and administer a series of crushing defeats on the Japanese.

When Halsey assumed command of the Third Fleet in the Central Pacific in June 1944, Carney accompanied him as Chief of Staff. Carney participated in the amphibious invasions of Palau and Lingayen, and the naval Battle of Leyte Gulf. It was during this engagement that Carney famously confronted an enraged Halsey. During Halsey's run to the north in tracking down the Japanese carriers, he received numerous calls from Admiral Thomas C. Kinkaid's Seventh Fleet, whose escort carriers were under attack from a Japanese battle group of battleships, cruisers and destroyers. Then, shortly after 10:00 hours, an anxious message was received from Admiral Chester Nimitz: "Where is repeat where is Task Force 34? The world wonders". The tail end of this message, The world wonders, was intended as padding designed to confuse enemy decoders, but was mistakenly left in the message when it was handed to Halsey. The inquiry appeared to be a rebuke. The fiery Halsey threw his hat on the deck of the bridge and began cursing. Finally Carney confronted him, telling Halsey "Stop it! What the hell's the matter with you? Pull yourself together." Halsey regained his composure, and later turned the fleet south to support Seventh Fleet.

Later, Carney continued to assist Halsey as Chief of Staff during his operations in the Okinawa campaign and the carrier air raids against Japanese air fields in Vietnam and Formosa in the South China Sea. In 1945, Third Fleet was striking targets in the Japanese homeland itself, launching attacks on Tokyo, the naval base at Kure and the northern Japanese island of Hokkaidō, as well as the bombardments of a number of Japanese coastal cities in preparation for a possible invasion of Japan which never happened.

Carney arranged with Japanese emissaries for the entry of the Third Fleet into Tokyo Bay, accepted the surrender of Yokosuka Naval Base and surrounding area from Vice Admiral Michitaro Tozuka of the Imperial Japanese Navy, and attended the ceremony for the surrender of Japan held on board Halsey's flagship, the battleship USS Missouri.

== Post-war ==
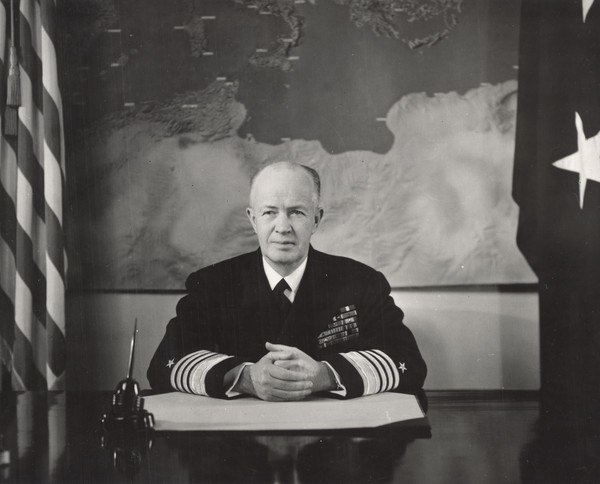
Official portrait of Admiral Robert Carney as Chief of Naval Operations

In 1946, Carney was promoted to vice admiral and, until February 1950, served as Deputy Chief of Naval Operations. He then assumed command of the Second Fleet operating on the East Coast of the United States. On October 2, 1950, Carney was advanced in rank to admiral.

From 1951 to 1953, Carney served as Commander-in-Chief of the North Atlantic Treaty Organization's Allied Forces Southern Europe, where he was responsible for the fleets of five countries and the armed forces of Italy, Greece and Turkey.

On May 13, 1953, President Dwight D. Eisenhower selected Carney as the next Chief of Naval Operations. On completion of this assignment, Carney retired from active service in the Navy.

Over the next several years, Carney's various assignments, coupled with his personal interest in industrial participation in the defense effort, resulted in close contact with industry including the position of chairman of the board, Bath Iron Works, Corporation.

Carney died of cardiac arrest in Washington, D.C., on June 25, 1990, at the age of 95. He and his wife are buried at Arlington National Cemetery. USS Carney (DDG-64) and Carney Park were named in his honor.

== Honors and awards ==

1st Row	Navy Cross	Navy Distinguished Service Medal w/ three gold award stars	Legion of Merit w/ "V" Device
2nd Row	Bronze Star Medal w/ "V" Device	World War I Victory Medal w/ Commendation Star and Escort Clasp	American Defense Service Medal w/ Atlantic Clasp
3rd row	American Campaign Medal	European-African-Middle Eastern Campaign Medal	Asiatic-Pacific Campaign Medal w/ with one silver and four bronze service stars
4th row	World War II Victory Medal	Navy Occupation Service Medal	National Defense Service Medal
5th row	Order of British Empire	Philippine Liberation Medal w/ two stars	Unidentified

== Notes ==
Military offices
Preceded by William M. Fechteler	Chief of Naval Operations; 1953–1955	Succeeded by Arleigh A. Burke
