= Charles M. Price Support Center =

Former United States Army base in Granite City, Illinois

Coordinates: 38°42′05″N 90°08′55″W

Charles M. Price Support Center (CMPSC) was a United States Army facility located in Granite City, Illinois, across the Mississippi River directly to the east of St. Louis.

== History ==
Originally selected as a site for a U.S. Army supply depot during World War I, it was not established until World War II as the Granite City Engineer Depot. The installation employed up to 5,200 people and trained another 1,500 in maintenance and engineering supply at Camp Charles M. Price during the war.

After the war, the depot was largely inactive until being designated the Granite City Army Depot in 1962 when it transferred from the Corps of Engineers to the U.S. Army Materiel Command. The installation underwent several changes in mission over the next thirty-five years. The actual supply depot closed in 1971, and the site became the Headquarters and Installation for Support Activity of the U.S. Army Aviation Systems Command. With a larger support emphasis, it became the U.S. Army St. Louis Area Support Center (SLASC) in 1975, with about 500 employees. In 1988, long-time Illinois Congressman Melvin Price was honored by having the center renamed the Charles Melvin Price Support Center (CMPSC), through which about 1,000 employees supplied logistical, administrative, and recreational support for 75 U.S. military and federal agencies in the St. Louis area.

The center was designated for closure by the Army in 1995, and the functions were transferred to other sites over the following years, with employment dropping to around 300 by its closure. Simultaneous to the closing of the facility, redevelopment plans were being put into place. Now known as The Port, the former military facility has a YMCA, numerous recreational facilities, residential areas, several industrial sites, and a small U.S. Army Reserve Center.
