= Naval Support Activity Mechanicsburg =

US Navy supply depot in Pennsylvania

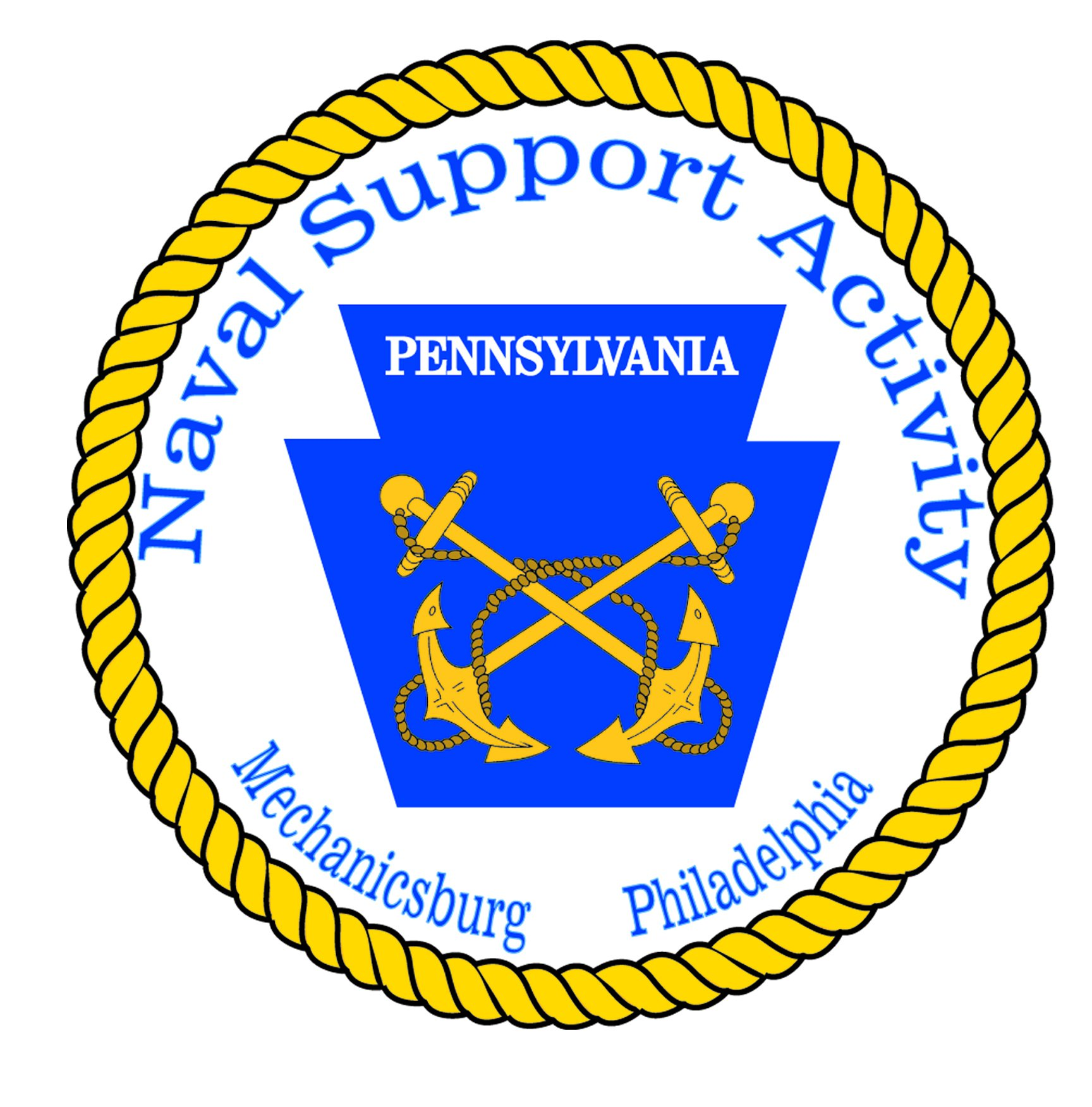
Naval Support Activity Mechanicsburg
- Part of Navy Region Mid-Atlantic
- Cumberland County, Pennsylvania

Site information
- Type: Supply depot
- Owner: United States
- Controlled by: United States Navy
- Sister installations: Naval Support Activity Philadelphia

Location
- Location of Naval Support Activity Mechanicsburg
- Coordinates: 40.2284216°N 76.9917456°W
- Area: 806 acres (1.259 sq mi)

Site history
- Built: 1942
- In use: Active

Garrison information
- Current commander: CAPT Johnetta Thomas, SC, USN

Naval Support Activity Mechanicsburg is an 806 acres (1.259 sq mi) naval supply depot just outside of Mechanicsburg in Cumberland County, Pennsylvania, United States. Largely industrial, and home to over 150 warehouses containing 8,800,000 square feet (820,000 m^{2}) of storage space and other buildings, it is the headquarters of the Naval Supply Systems Command. It is also the parent installation of Naval Support Activity Philadelphia and the Philadelphia Navy Yard Annex, which share the same commanding officer.

The Parts Control Center is in Hampden Township.

== History ==
By the early 1940s, with the United States engaged in World War II, it became clear that the Navy needed inland supply depots. With the advent of the “Five Ocean” Navy, overcrowded coastal Navy facilities were in need of relief. The Mechanicsburg area was one of five locations chosen for new depots. Close to the Pennsylvania Turnpike and the railroad yards at Enola, the bucolic Pennsylvania countryside offered an ideal location.

The establishment of the Naval Supply Depot (NSD), Mechanicsburg, Pa. was authorized with the passing of Public Law No. 353 by the 77th Congress, December 17, 1941. The base was commissioned on October 1, 1942. The Ship's Parts Control Center (SPCC) was commissioned as a tenant activity of the Naval Supply Depot on July 16, 1945. SPCC spun off the Naval Supply Depot in 1953 and became a full-fledged activity with its own commanding officer.

The next major change occurred July 1972, when the Naval Supply Depot merged with the Navy Ships Parts Control Center. With 2,800 military and civilian employees, including 600 who were transferred from NSD, SPCC was the largest activity at Mechanicsburg.

The 1990s witnessed some reorganization, as SPCC merged with the Aviation Support Office in Philadelphia to form the Naval Inventory Control Point (NAVICP).

In July 1996, the Naval Supply Systems Command (NAVSUP) Headquarters moved into Mechanicsburg from its leased facilities in Crystal City, Virginia. This move brought the status of a Supply Corps rear admiral upper half and an influx of new faces to the base. The headquarters activity was now physically aligned with two of NAVSUP's activities: NAVICP and the Fleet Material Support Office (FMSO).

In the late 1990s, the management of the base turned over to Navy Region Mid-Atlantic in Norfolk, Virginia, and the host command, the Naval Support Activity (NSA) Mechanicsburg, with detachments in Northeast Philadelphia and at the Navy Yard Annex in Philadelphia, was formally stood up. The base was renamed Naval Support Activity, with NAVSUP, NAVICP and the Navy Supply Information Systems Activity (NAVSISA), formerly FMSO, as primary tenants.

== Tenant commands ==
NSA Mechanicsburg now serves approximately 4,600 civilian, military and industry partners assigned to over 40 tenant activities or commands. Outside of the NAVSUP headquarters, the other three largest commands on the installation actually direct subordinates the NAVSUP Weapons Systems Support (formerly NAVICP) command and the Business Systems Center (formerly NAVSISA). Other commands located on the base include the several Defense Logistics Agency commands, the NAVSEA Logistics Center, and the United States Army Reserve's 382nd Engineer Company.

Overall, NAVSUP personnel make up approximately 54% of the installation's population.
