= NAVSUP Business Systems Center =

Echelon III command of the Naval Supply Systems Command

The Naval Supply Systems Command Business Systems Center (NAVSUP BSC) designs, develops, maintains, integrates, and implements business systems for the United States Navy, United States Department of Defense, joint service, and other federal agencies.

NAVSUP BSC is an Echelon III command of the Naval Supply Systems Command.

NAVSUP Business Systems Center delivers Information Technology/Information Management (IT/IM) solutions with specific emphasis on logistics and financial related products and services.

== History ==
NAVSUP BSC began as the U.S. Navy's Fleet Material Support Office (FMSO) on Jan. 15, 1962 under the command of Capt. I. F. Haddock. The command's original mission was to manage Navy-owned retail stocks of medical, general, and industrial materials bought and controlled by the newly established Defense Supply Agency. FMSO also coordinated efforts of inventory control points in the preparation of allowance and load lists for all supply support materials aboard ship and at overseas bases. Over time, the mission of command has evolved, and is now focused on information technology.

== NAVSUP Business Systems Center locations ==
NAVSUP Business Systems Center Headquarters is a tenant activity of Naval Support Activity Mechanicsburg, PA in Cumberland County, Pennsylvania. Nine additional BSC locations exist, with six U.S. locations, and three international locations. These are:

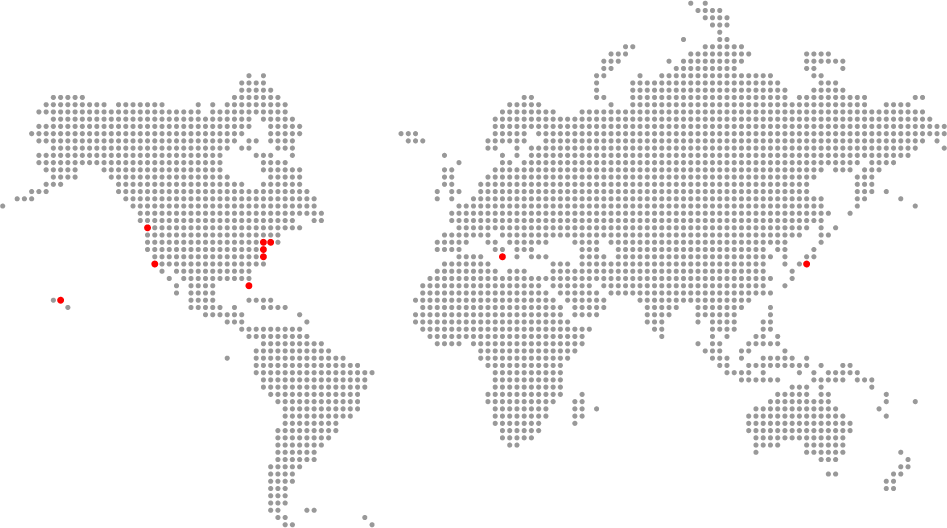
NAVSUP BSC Operating Locations

- Naval Station Norfolk, Virginia
- Naval Support Activity, Philadelphia, Pennsylvania
- Naval Air Station Jacksonville, Florida
- San Diego, California
- Naval Base Kitsap, Bremerton, Washington
- Naval Station Pearl Harbor, Hawaii
- Naval Air Station Sigonella, Italy
- U.S. Fleet Activities Yokosuka, Japan

== Navy Supply System Command activities ==
The twelve NAVSUP Echelon III activities are:

- NAVSUP Weapon Systems Support (NAVSUP WSS)
- NAVSUP Business Systems Center (NAVSUP BSC)
- Navy Exchange Service Command (NEXCOM)
- NAVSUP Global Logistics Support (NAVSUP GLS)
  - NAVSUP Fleet Logistics Center Jacksonville (NAVSUP FLC Jacksonville)
  - NAVSUP Fleet Logistics Center Norfolk (NAVSUP FLC Norfolk)
  - NAVSUP Fleet Logistics Center Pearl Harbor (NAVSUP FLC Pearl Harbor)
  - NAVSUP Fleet Logistics Center Puget Sound (NAVSUP FLC Puget Sound)
  - NAVSUP Fleet Logistics Center San Diego (NAVSUP FLC San Diego)
  - NAVSUP Fleet Logistics Center Sigonella (NAVSUP FLC Sigonella)
  - NAVSUP Fleet Logistics Center Yokosuka (NAVSUP FLC Yokosuka)
  - NAVSUP Fleet Logistics Center Bahrain (NAVSUP FLC Bahrain)
