= Naval Support Activity Hampton Roads =

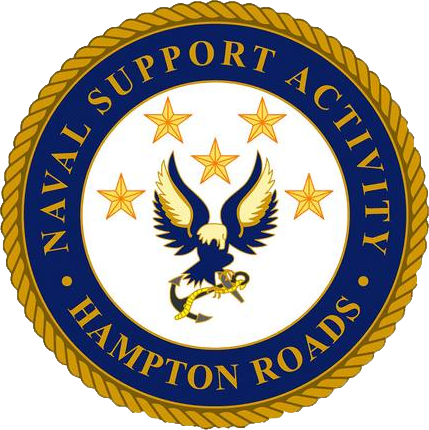
- Command insignia of NSAHR
- Founded: 1948
- Country: United States
- Branch: United States Navy
- Type: Naval base
- Role: management and support of three installations in the Hampton Roads region
- Size: ~ 6000 personnel
- Part of: Navy Region Mid-Atlantic
- Location: Norfolk, Virginia

Commanders
- Commanding Officer: CAPT Matthew Frauenzimmer

Naval Support Activity Hampton Roads (NSA HR) is a United States Navy Echelon 4 regional support commander that is responsible to Navy Region Mid-Atlantic for the operation and maintenance of the installation of the same name that it is headquartered on. Adjacent to, but separate from Naval Station Norfolk, NSA Hampton Roads has the largest concentration of fleet headquarters administrative and communication facilities outside of Washington, D.C., including the headquarters for United States Fleet Forces Command, Naval Reserve Forces Command and United States Marine Corps Forces Command, along with components of the Joint Chiefs of Staff, and the home campus for the Joint Forces Staff College. NSA Hampton Roads is also home to NATO’s Joint Force Command Norfolk and NATO's Allied Command Transformation.

In addition, NSAHR manages Naval Support Activity Northwest Annex in the Hickory section of Chesapeake and provides installation support services to Naval Medical Center Portsmouth (NMCP).

== History ==
NSA Hampton Roads traces its lineage back to the Commander in Chief, U.S. Atlantic Fleet (now U.S. Fleet Forces Command). On 1 February 1941, when the Atlantic Fleet was resurrected, the LANTFLEET staff was headquartered in an odd assortment of ships; the USS Augusta (CA-31), then the old wooden ship USS Constellation, USS Vixen (PG-53), and then USS Pocono (AGC-16). In 1948, the LANTFLEET staff moved into the former naval hospital at Norfolk, Virginia, which is where it currently remains. It was at that time, that the Atlantic Fleet Commander would create the CINCLANTFLEET Flag Administrative Unit to provide limited logistic services and support to CINCLANTFLT staff's.

In May 1977, after a four-month study, the chief of naval operations established the Atlantic Fleet Headquarters Support Activity (HSA) to provide administrative, personnel, logistics, maintenance, transportation, special services, supply, and fiscal services to tenant activities and commands so they could operate with maximum emphasis on their primary missions. In 1987, the chain of command was restructured once again, making the HSA an echelon four command under Commander, Naval Base, Norfolk (the predecessor for Navy Region Mid-Atlantic).

In 1999, HSA was redesignated a major command and dual-hatted with the responsibilities as the Installation Commander for three base installations and as the Program Director for Regional Support Services. The following year, Headquarters Support Activity was disestablished and renamed Naval Support Activity, Norfolk. In October 2011, NSA received approval to change its name to Naval Support Activity Hampton Roads, as it now included two additional bases that were not located in Norfolk.

== Overview ==
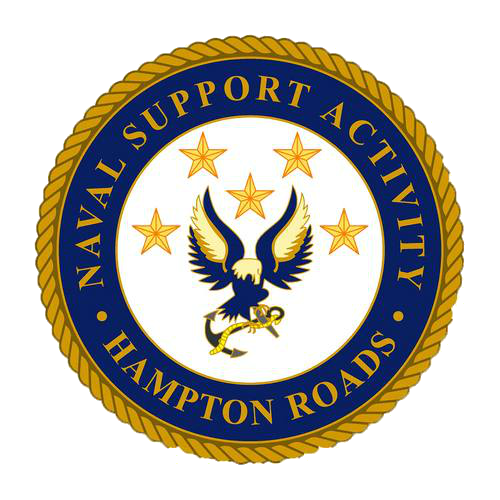
Naval Support Activity Hampton Roads
- Part of Navy Region Mid-Atlantic
- Norfolk, Virginia

Site information
- Owner: United States
- Controlled by: United States Navy

Garrison information
- Garrison: Allied Command Transformation; United States Fleet Forces Command; United States Marine Corps Forces Command

=== Main campus ===
The main campus of NSA Hampton Roads is located in Norfolk, Virginia, with Virginia State Route 406 (International Terminal Boulevard) bordering its southern side, Virginia State Route 337 (Hampton Boulevard) bordering its western side, and Interstate 564 bordering its eastern side, with the main entrance located on Terminal Blvd.

Most of the commands on the main campus are either force-level (Echelon II) or fleet level (Echelon III) commanders. It is the headquarters for four Echelon II commands -- United States Fleet Forces Command, Navy Reserve Forces, Operational Test and Evaluation Force and United States Marine Corps Forces Command, and for two Echelon III commands: Naval Air Force Atlantic, and Submarine Forces Atlantic.

It is also the home for part of the Joint Chiefs of Staff Operational Plans and Joint Force Development (J7) directorate alongside the Joint Forces Staff College. NATO's Allied Command Transformation and the joint NATO-USFF Combined Joint Operations from the Sea Center of Excellence are also both located on this campus.

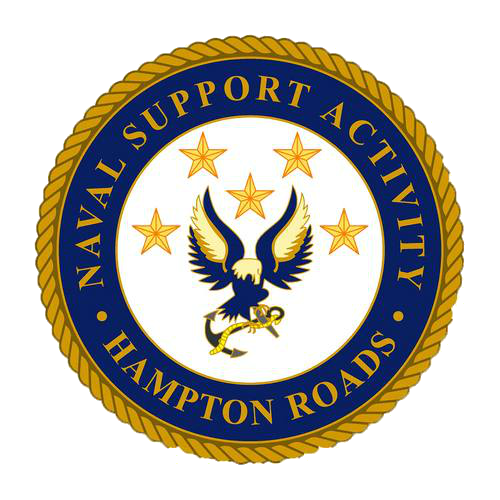
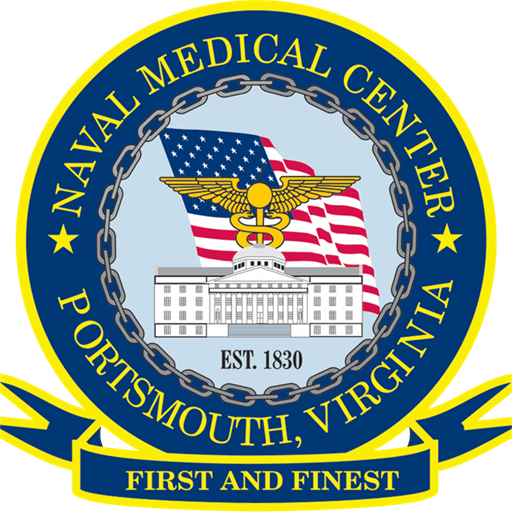
Naval Support Activity Hampton Roads - Portsmouth
- Part of Navy Region Mid-Atlantic
- Norfolk, Virginia

Site information
- Controlled by: United States Navy

Location
- Coordinates: 36.846°N 76.306°W

==== Naval Support Activity Hampton Roads - Portsmouth ====
NSA Hampton Roads - Portsmouth is a separate sub-installation of the main campus that houses Navy Medicine East and Naval Medical Center Portsmouth (NMCP) on the latter's sprawling 20 acres campus situated directly on the Elizabeth River in Portsmouth. The hospital's buildings are registered National Register of Historic Places

In 2011, the Chief of Naval Operations directed the Bureau of Medicine and Surgery (BUMED) to transfer control of the base to CNIC, which subsequently assigned it to Navy Region Mid-Atlantic and to NSA Hampton Roads. NSAHR assumed installation control on October 1, 2011 and now provides all base operation support services (such as security/police services, housing, and Morale, Welfare and Recreation to the installation. Prior to that, NMCP personnel and contract staff had been performing most of the duties.

Naval Support Activity Hampton Roads - Lafeyette River Annex
- Part of Navy Region Mid-Atlantic
- Norfolk, Virginia

Site information
- Owner: United States
- Controlled by: United States Navy

Location
- Coordinates: 36.902°N 76.303°W

==== Naval Support Activity Hampton Roads - Lafeyette River Annex ====
The Lafeyette River Annex houses Naval Facilities Engineering Systems Command. The campus was originally built for the Norfolk U.S. Marine Hospital.

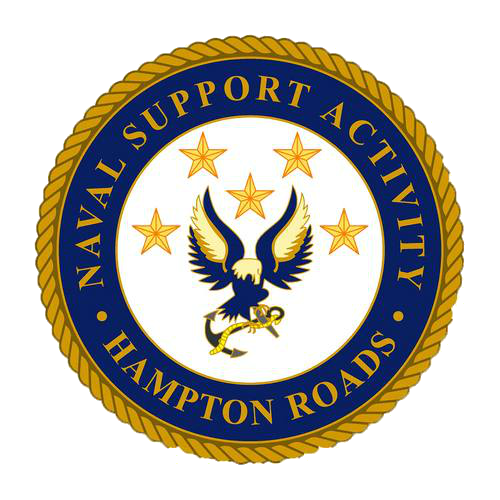
Naval Support Activity Northwest Annex
- Part of Navy Region Mid-Atlantic
- Chesapeake, Virginia

Site information
- Owner: United States
- Controlled by: United States Navy

Location
- Coordinates: 36.569°N 76.248°W

Garrison information
- Current commander: LCDR Brian Demange; Officer in Charge

=== Naval Support Activity Northwest Annex ===
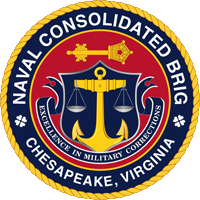
Seal of NAVCONBRIG Chesapeake.

Naval Support Activity Northwest Annex is located in rural southern Chesapeake, Virginia on the border of North Carolina. Approximately 2/3 of the land is located in Virginia, while the remaining 1/3 is in North Carolina. It provides support to the eleven tenant commands, the largest of which is the Naval Consolidated Brig, Chesapeake (NAVCONBRIG Chesapeake) or the Joint Regional Correctional Facility Mid-Atlantic. The brig is a military prison, serving as Building 500 of the Northwest Annex of NSA Hampton Roads.

==== History ====
In May 1955, the U.S. Naval Radio Station was activated to serve as a receiving facility for naval activities in the Norfolk area. After years of operating and functioning as a naval radio station, in September 1970, the Naval Radio Station Northwest became a component activity of the Naval Communication Station Norfolk. In 1975, the Naval Security Group Activity Northwest was established. Since 1975, the base has continued to change, but it still hosts an interesting and diverse group of tenant commands and personnel.

==== Tenant commands ====
Outside of the Brig, NSA Northwest Annex is the home to several Naval Security Forces related training schools. It also lays host to a number of communications and information commands, including a Navy Information Operations Command detachment.
