= Great Plains Joint Training Center =

US Army National Guard facility

- Part of Kansas National Guard
- 10 Miles west of Salina, Kansas

Site information
- Type: National Guard Base
- Owner: State of Kansas
- Controlled by: Kansas Adjutant General

Location
- Coordinates: 37°42′03″N 097°50′03″W

Site history
- Built: 1942 (as Smoky Hill Bombing Range) 2009 (as GPJTC)
- Built by: McPherson Contractors, Inc (Topeka)
- In use: 2009 – present

Garrison information
- Garrison: 284th Air Support Operations Squadron (ANG) Kansas Regional Training Institute Smoky Hill Weapons Range

The Great Plains Joint Training Center is an Army National Guard facility owned and operated by the state of Kansas Adjutant General's Office. It is located on the site of the Smoky Hill Bombing Range, part of the former Schilling Air Force Base near Salina, Kansas. The bombing range is now known as the Smoky Hill Weapons Range and is one of the most active National Guard bombing ranges in the United States. It was opened in 2009 and is also home to the Kansas Air National Guard's 284th Air Support Operations Squadron and the Kansas Regional Training Institute.

== Facilities ==
- Kansas Regional Training Institute
- 284th Air Support Operations Squadron
- Smoky Hill Weapons Range

=== Crisis City ===
While not officially part of the GPJTC (but located on a portion of the weapons range) Crisis City is a training facility to simulate real-world disaster and crisis operations.
