= Joint Training and Training Development Center =

- Fort Dix CDP's location in Burlington County (Inset: Location of Burlington County in New Jersey). Joint Training and Training Development Center (New Jersey) Joint Training and Training Development Center (the United States)
- Coordinates: 40.028845°N 74.638500°W
- Country: United States
- State: New Jersey
- County: Burlington
- Township: New Hanover; Pemberton; Springfield

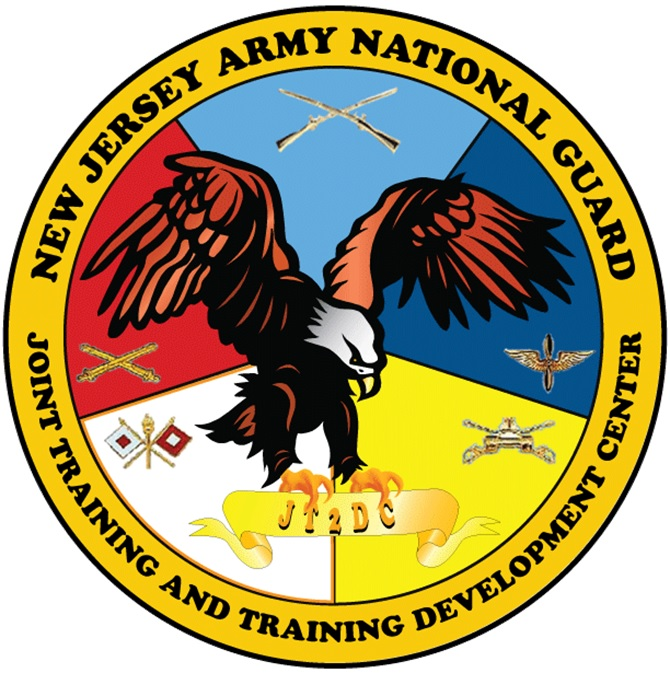
JT2DC Logo

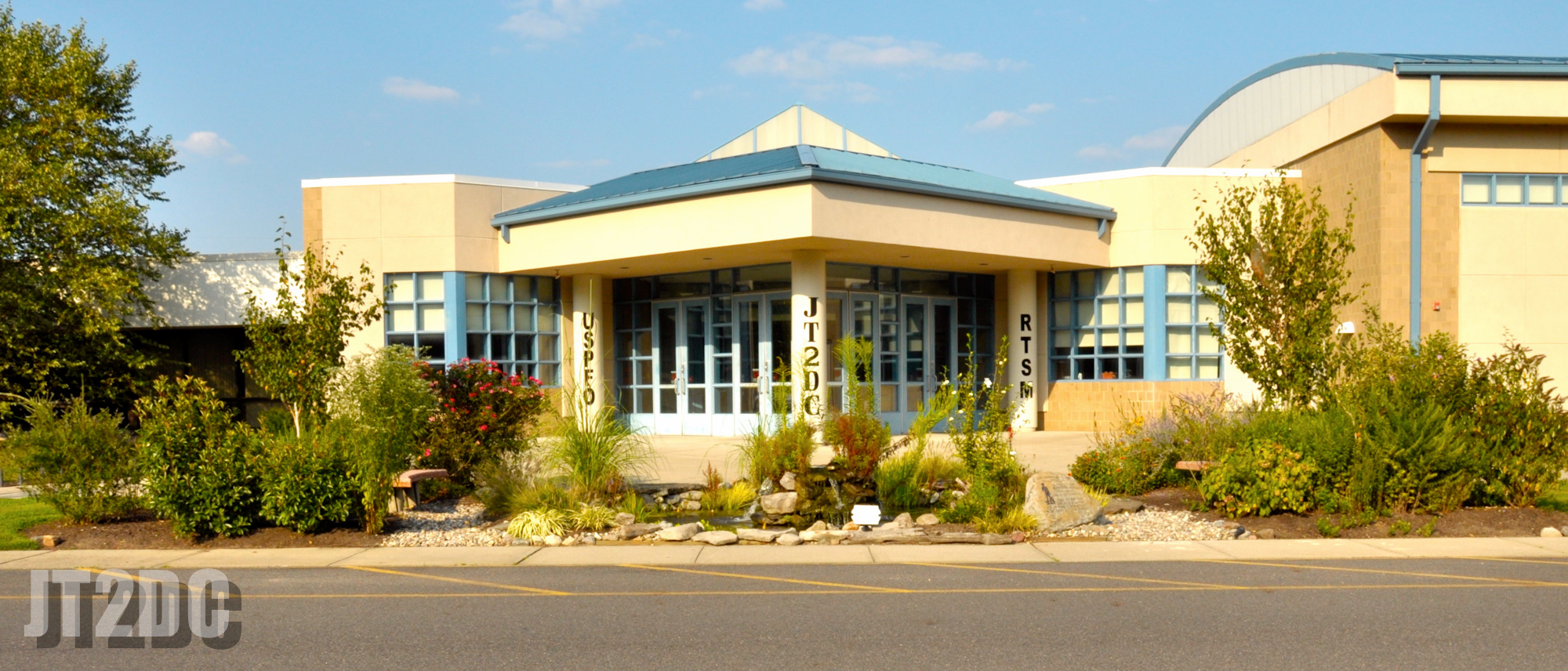
Joint Training and Training Development Center (JT2DC) Building Entrance

The Joint Training and Training Development Center (JT2DC) is a training facility for the United States Army National Guard and is operated by the New Jersey Army National Guard. The JT2DC is located at Joint Base McGuire-Dix-Lakehurst in Burlington County, New Jersey.

The facility is a training centre for military personnel, law enforcement officers, and foreign allies. It provides advanced simulators and environments in which to experience realistic combat scenarios. Supporting up to 20,000 personnel each year, the centre is involved in energy initiatives, including solar power projects that enhance sustainability and operational efficiency. JT2DC plays a vital role in disaster response and military preparedness, thereby demonstrating its commitment to achieving energy independence and environmental benefits. The JT2DC provides Training Aids, Devices, Simulators and Simulations (TADSS) though its Regional Battle Simulation Training Center. All classrooms and conference areas are equipped with internet access and remote video abilities.

In April 2018, a new command team began at the JT2DC, Col. Paul E Rumberger III and Command Sgt. Maj. John Hicks took over for Col. Paul Nema and Command Sgt. Maj. Paula Cantara.
