= Carney Park =

US military recreational facility in Italy

Coordinates: 40.852°N 14.107°E

Carney Park is a United States military recreational facility located in Pozzuoli, Italy.

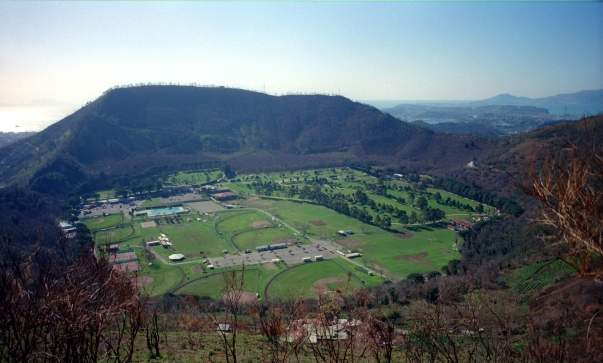
Carney Park is inside the caldera of the dormant Gauro volcano.

The 96-acre (39-ha) site is one of the largest facilities of the United States in Italy, located at the foot of Monte Corvara, the northern part of the Gauro volcano, occupying the caldera of Campiglione, in the Phlegrean Fields.

It is named after Four Star Admiral Robert B. Carney who served as Chief of Naval Operations during the Eisenhower administration.

It was established on May 21, 1966, under the guidance of the MWR as a recreational structure to support a series of needs of the U.S. military community present in Italy, such as sports facilities and cultural activities, as well as for other purely recreational activities.

== History ==
The park was established on May 21, 1966, by the Morale, Welfare, and Recreation Command (MWR) of the United States Department of Defense. It was originally established and administered by the United States Navy under the auspices of Naples' Naval Support Activity (NSA). The Morale and Welfare Authority (MWA) of AFSOUTH, under the direction of facilities engineer Col. Frank D. McCoy, designed and built the nine-hole golf course in 1969. The golf course and recreational facilities were administered separately from the NSA by AFSOUTH until 1995. At that time, AFSOUTH turned over administration of the golf course to the NSA, thus consolidating the oversight of all resources at the site under the NSA's MWR.

== Facilities ==
According to its facilities brochure, as of 2008, Carney Park's resources consisted of:

- a 9-hole golf course,
- Olympic size outdoor swimming pool,
- 5 adult size softball fields,
- 1 adult size baseball field,
- 2 little league baseball fields,
- 1 little league softball field,
- 1 football field and 1 soccer pitch,
- 4 lighted tennis courts,
- 2 batting cages,
- 1 outdoor basketball court,
- 4 sandlot volleyball courts,
- horseshoe pits,
- 20 small picnic sites, 11 large picnic areas, a Boy and Girl Scout camp area, 30 tent sites, and 25 cabins,
- 1 paintball field, a youth center, a teen center, a snack bar, and a restaurant.

== Festa americana ==
Every year between the end of June and the beginning of July the historic festa americana has been taking place for over half a century.

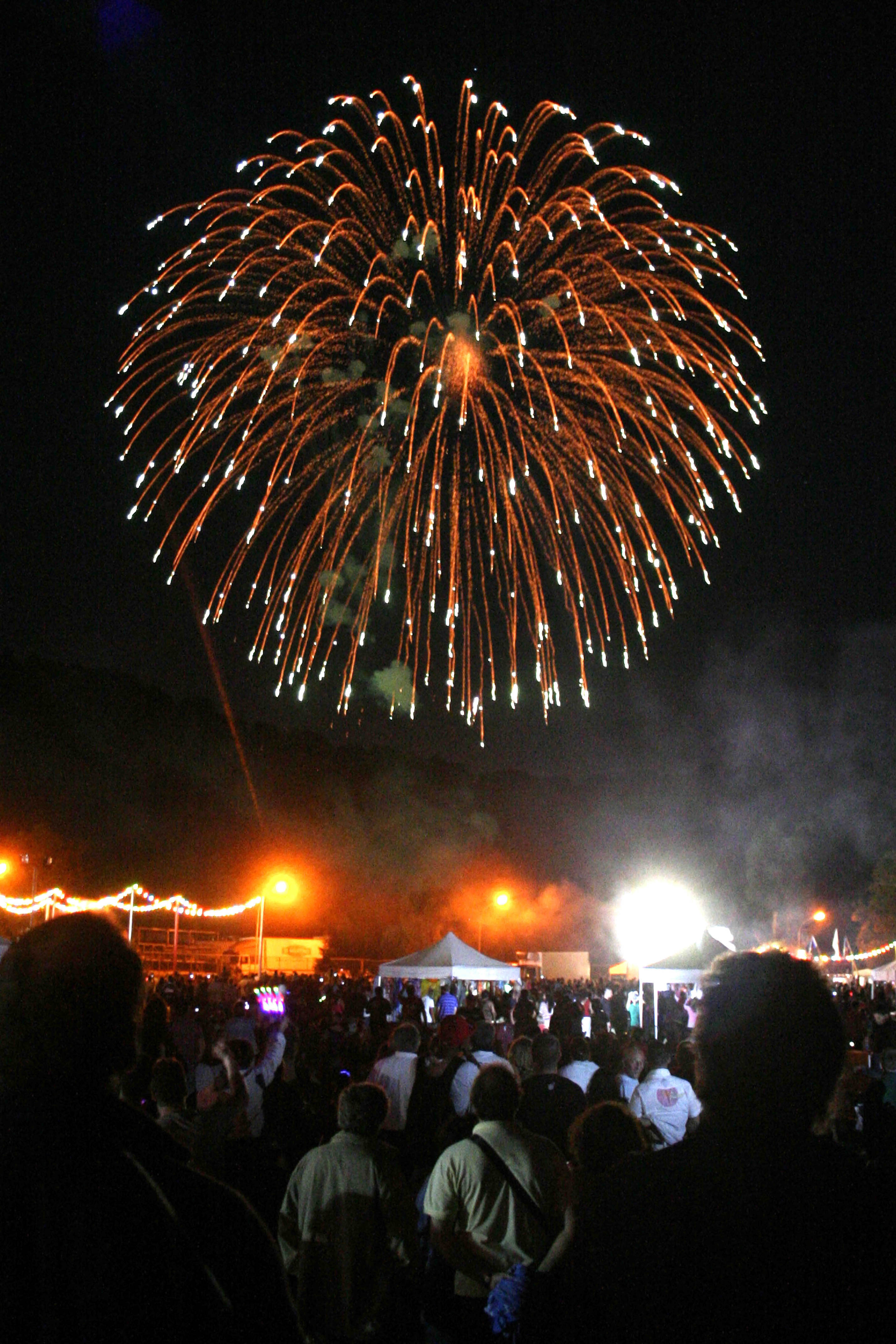
