= Naval Support Activity Philadelphia =

United States Navy base in Pennsylvania

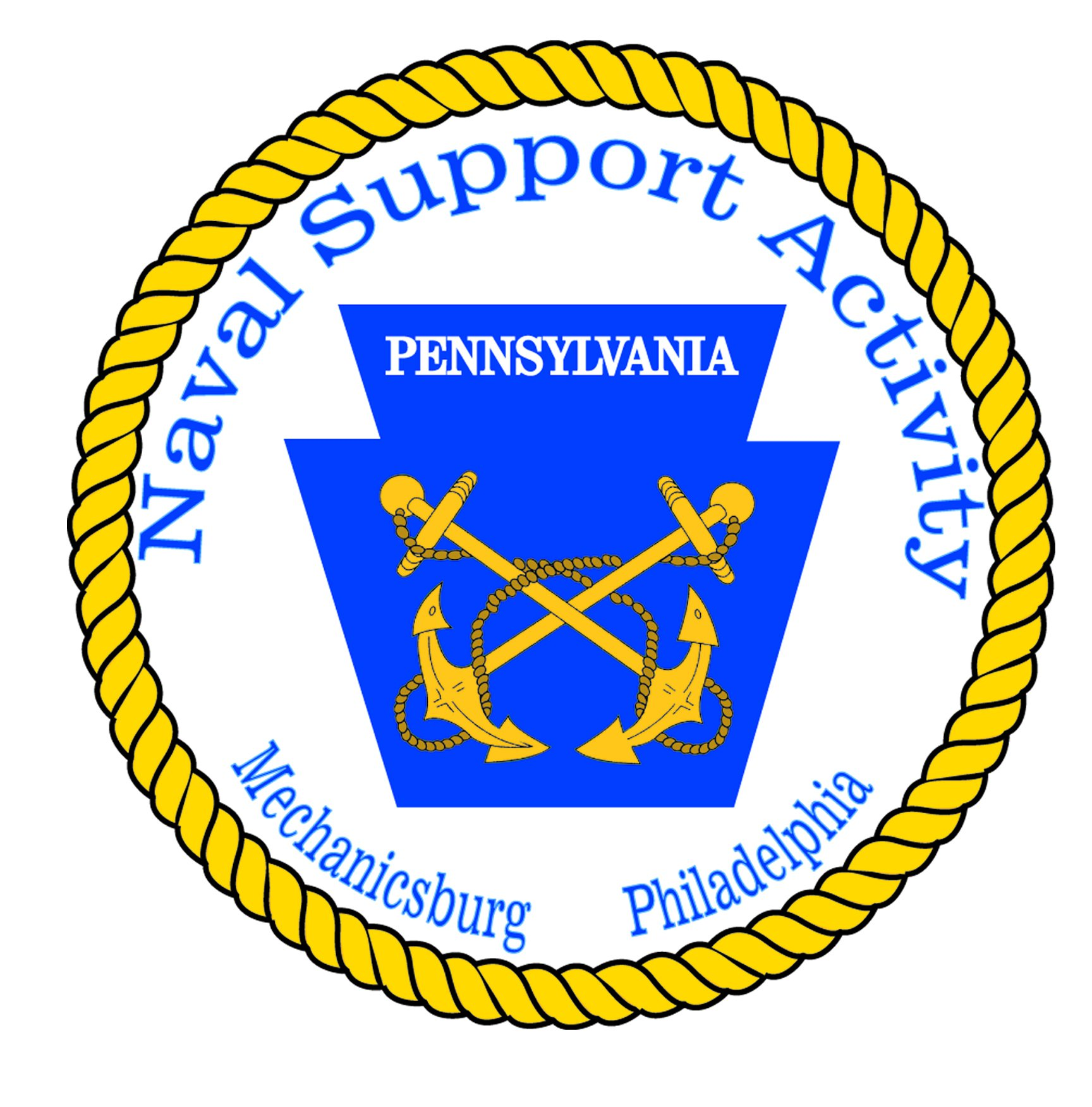
Naval Support Activity Philadelphia
- Part of Navy Region Mid-Atlantic
- Near Northeast Philadelphia, Pennsylvania

Site information
- Type: Supply depot
- Owner: United States
- Controlled by: United States Navy
- Parent installation: Naval Support Activity Mechanicsburg

Location
- Location of Naval Support Activity Mechanicsburg
- Coordinates: 40.0416828°N 75.0937712°W
- Area: 134 acres (0.209 sq mi)

Site history
- Built: 1942
- In use: Active

Garrison information
- Current commander: CAPT Preston Gill, SC, USN Commanding Officer; CDR A. J. Kruppa, USN Officer in Charge, NSA Philadelphia

Naval Support Activity Philadelphia is a 134-acre (0.209 sq mi) United States Navy base located in the Lawncrest section of Northeast Philadelphia, Pennsylvania and located 113 miles (182 km) east of its parent command, NSA Mechanicsburg. With the exception of a few buildings, much of the base is industrial in style, and consists of office-converted warehouses for the various Naval supply commands located on the installation. According to the base guide, its warehouse offices and other buildings amount to 2,250,000 square feet (209,000 m^{2}) of cubic space on the base. It also provides support services to Navy units that are situated at the Philadelphia Navy Yard Annex.

== History ==
The history of what is now Naval Support Activity Philadelphia began during World War II as the Naval Aviation Supply Depot in 1942. Prior to its purchase by the Navy in 1942, NSA Philadelphia was home to the Keystone Brick Company. A bustling enterprise that provided many facades throughout the city. One of the company's most famous buildings was its headquarters. With elaborate brickwork, both interior and exterior, it was a structure of regional prominence. After purchasing the brickyard site, the Navy refurbished the building into “Quarters A” home to the highest-ranking officer on the installation.

From its inception, the Depot would act as not just a home to Naval Aviation parts, but was also the headquarters of Defense Industrial Supply Center, the predecessor to Defense Logistics Agency., who operated out of the Schuylkill Arsenal in Philadelphia. Built to function as a quartermaster and provide the U.S. military with supplies, one of its most famous tasks was outfitting the Lewis and Clark Expedition. This organization would grow and transition into the Defense Industrial Supply Center, and its headquarters would locate at the Naval Aviation Supply Depot Compound in Northeast Philadelphia in the mid-1940s.

In the late 1940s, the supply depot mission at NSA Philadelphia began to phase out. In response, the Navy converted storehouse space into offices, a trend that continued for decades. Through its more recent history the Naval Support Activity has grown as Base Realignment and Closure Commission actions consolidated missions and moved them to the installation.

== Tenant Commands ==
Defense Logistics Agency (DLA) and the Naval Supply Systems Command (NAVSUP) are the two major tenants of the installations. Navy Recruiting Command's District Philadelphia is headquartered here as well, along with Civil Air Patrol (CAP) Squadron 104, U.S. Naval Sea Cadet Corps's San Antonio Division and the Navy Special Emphasis Office of the Defense Contract Management Agency (DCMA). The Navy Office of Civilian Human Resources has also maintained its Philadelphia Operations Center on the base, since it moved from the Philadelphia Bourse building in 2011 after a BRAC decision.

== Campus ==
No housing for personnel is on-post. People live off-post. Dependent children of workers attend various schools in the Philadelphia area.
