= Naval Support Facility Saratoga Springs =

United States Navy base in New York

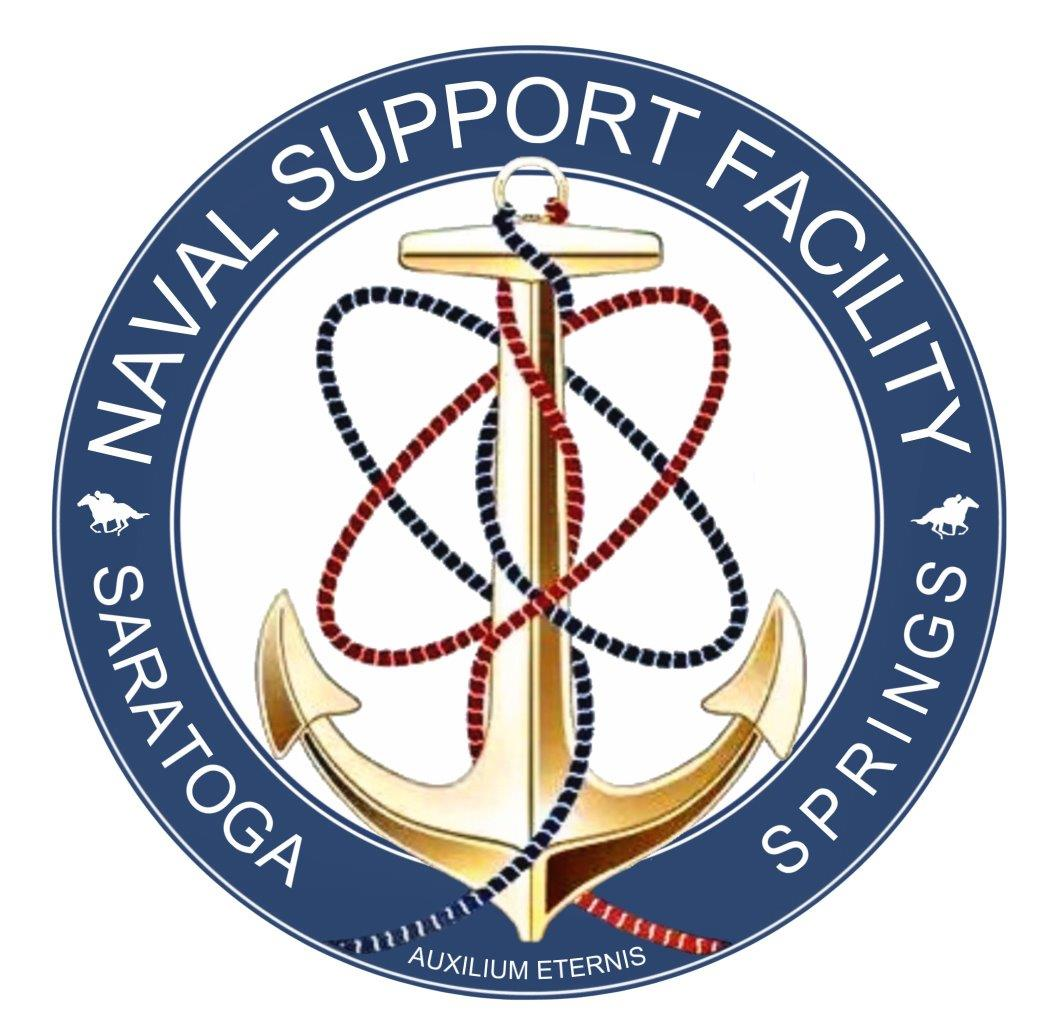
Naval Support Facility Saratoga Springs
- Part of Navy Region Mid-Atlantic
- Saratoga Springs, New York in the United States

Site information
- Type: Naval Base
- Owner: United States
- Operator: United States Navy
- Open to the public: No
- Website: Official website

Location
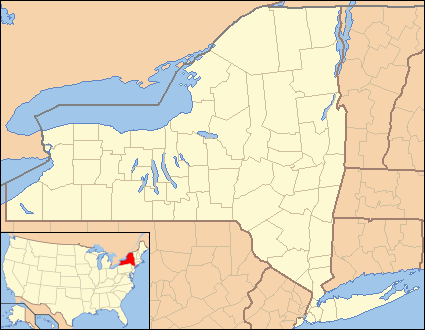
- Coordinates: 43.0786265°N 73.8204475°W

Site history
- Built: 1974
- In use: Active service

Garrison information
- Current commander: CDR Elvis T. Mikel - Commanding Officer; LT Joseph P. Dunne - Executive Officer; CMDCS Jeffrey P. Simpson, Command Senior Chief

Naval Support Facility Saratoga Springs (NSF Saratoga Springs) is a base of the United States Navy that is located in Saratoga County in Upstate New York. Its mission is to provide support services to naval assets within the New York Capital region as well as those in neighboring Connecticut and Massachusetts. Primarily however, it serves the Naval Nuclear Power Training Command students and staff that are located just 7 miles (11 km) west in nearby Ballston Spa.

== History ==
NSA Saratoga Springs traces its origin to the establishment of Naval Administrative Unit (NAU) Scotia, NY in 1974 to support the Navy’s nuclear power operations in Ballston Spa, NY. NAU Scotia eventually was moved to Saratoga Springs, NY and renamed Naval Support Unit (NSU) Saratoga Springs in 1999. On October 1, 2010, the command changed to Naval Support Activity (NSA) Saratoga Springs when it became aligned under Commander, Navy Installations Command and Navy Region Mid-Atlantic. On May 21, 2023, the facility's name changed to its current one now aligning under Naval Submarine Base New London.

== Background ==
The base is located in one of the most scenic areas of the country, approximately 35 miles north of the New York state capital of Albany and situated between the Catskill and Adirondack Mountains. The installation has a full service Navy Exchange, Commissary, while the installation's branch health and dental clinic, Naval Health Clinic New England share space with civilian health providers off-installation.

NSA Saratoga Springs serves an active duty population of approximately 3,000. In addition to its active duty populace, the small installation supports Naval Reservists in several Naval Operations Support Centers (NOSC) and Navy Recruiters within a 50-mile radius, as well as ANG personnel stationed on Stratton Air National Guard Base in nearby Schenectady County. Retirees are also eligible for certain services on the installation.
