= Naval Computer and Telecommunications Station Naples, Italy =

- Active: 1963-present
- Country: Italy
- Branch: United States Navy
- Type: Shore
- Role: Communications Support
- Nickname: NCTS Naples
- Motto: "Warfighters connecting Warfighters."

The Naval Computer and Telecommunications Station Naples (NCTS Naples) provides voice, video and data services to the U.S. Navy joint, allied and coalition customers. It has two staffed sites: C4I at Capodichino and SATCOM at Lago Patria. NCTS Naples has approximately 20 Officers, 325 Enlisted personnel, and 40 civilians.

== History ==
=== 1963 to 1968 ===
In 1963, Naval Communication Unit was established on the Joint Force Command Naples (AFSOUTH) post in Bagnoli. Most of the unit's resources came from the communications department of Naval Support Activity, Naples. In May 1968, its mission was expanded to include fleet support for units in the Mediterranean Sea and the command was renamed Naval Communications Station, Italy (NAVCOMMSTA).

=== 1974 to 1976 ===
In July 1974, the continuing expansion was marked by the installation of the Naval Communication Processing and Routing System (NAVCOMPARS) and sophisticated satellite systems.

On April 1, 1976, NAVCOMMSTA was redesignated as Naval Communication Area Master Station, Mediterranean (NAVCAMS MED) and became one of four in the world. With the name change NAVCAMS MED received an expanded mission, including oversight of all tactical naval communication systems and circuitry within the Mediterranean communications area.

=== 1990s and later ===
In October 1991, NAVCAMS MED was tasked with providing computer support and services to local commands with the expanded mission it became Naval Computer Telecommunications Area Master Station, Mediterranean (NCTAMS MED). NCTAMS also began to provide operational direction to NAVCOMSTA Sicily and NAVCOMMU London.

In October 1993, NAVCOMMSTA Spain was placed under the operational direction of NCTAMS MED becoming NCTAMS MED Detachment Rota Spain.

NCTAMS MED began consolidation efforts in the Naples area by moving to the new state-of-the-art Command, Control, Communications, Computers, and Intelligence (C4I) facility located in the Capt John E Myers Building at Capodichino, the move was completed in 10 months. Following the completion of this move, NCTAMS assumed responsibility of Indian Ocean communications services. With this new operational responsibility came a new title NCTAMS EURCENT reflecting the European and Central (Indian Ocean and Southwest Asia) area of operation.

October 6, 2005 NCTAMS EURCENT as a part of Navy-wide consolidation was designated Naval Computer Telecommunications Station, Naples (NAVCOMTELSTA NAPLES IT). Today, NCTS Naples is vital part of US and Joint communications providing services to several local commands including United States Sixth Fleet, United States Naval Forces Europe and many other non-local commands. NCTS will become TNOSC (Theatre Network Operations Service Center) responsible for network management and directly providing Internet Protocol services through OCONUS Navy Enterprise-Network (ONE-NET). It also provides legacy circuits and messaging capabilities.
