= United States Army Institute of Heraldry =

Heraldic authority of the U.S. federal government

The Institute of Heraldry
- Seal

Agency overview
- Formed: 1 September 1960, at 5010 Duke Street, Cameron Station, Virginia
- Preceding Agency: Heraldic Program Office
- Jurisdiction: Federal government
- Headquarters: 9325 Gunston Road, Fort Belvoir, Virginia; 38°42′9″N 77°8′51″W
- Motto: "Aegis Fortissima Honos" (Latin) "Honor is the strongest shield"
- Employees: 14
- Parent Agency: Office of the Administrative Assistant to the Secretary of the Army
- Website: tioh.army.mil
- "Aegis Fortissima Honos March"

The Institute of Heraldry, officially The Institute of Heraldry, Department of the Army, is an activity of the administrative assistant to the secretary of the Army solely responsible for furnishing heraldic services to the president of the United States and all federal government agencies. Title 18 of the United States Code, Chapter 33, Section 704 and Title 32 of the Code of Federal Regulations, Part 507 permit the institute to issue directives on how military insignia are displayed, the criteria for issuance, and how insignia will be worn on military uniforms.

The activities of The Institute of Heraldry encompass research, design, development, standardization, quality control, and other services relating to official symbolic items—seals, decorations, medals, insignia, badges, flags, and other items awarded to or authorized for official wear or display by federal government personnel and agencies. Limited research and information services concerning official symbolic items are also provided to the general public. The Institute of Heraldry is located at 9325 Gunston Road, Fort Belvoir, Virginia, a military installation in the U.S. Army Military District of Washington. The institute employs 22 Department of the Army civilians.

== History ==
=== Heraldic Program Office (1919–1960) ===
Heraldic and other military symbols have been used by the U.S. Armed Forces and federal government agencies since the beginning of the American Revolution. However, there was no coordinated military heraldry program until 1919, when an office within the War Department General Staff was established to approve and coordinate coats of arms and insignia of army organizations. In 1924, formal staff responsibility for specific military designs was delegated to the quartermaster general of the Army. As the needs for symbolism by the military services and the federal government expanded, the scope of the services furnished by the Quartermaster General evolved into the Heraldic Program Office. The expansion of the army during World War II, and the subsequent increased interest in symbolism, contributed to the growth of the Heraldic Program Office. It was further expanded by Pub. L. 85–263, approved September 1957, 71 Stat. 89, which delineated the authority of the secretary of the Army to furnish heraldic services to military departments and other branches of the federal government.

=== The Institute of Heraldry (1960–present) ===
Overview of The Institute of Heraldry, 1967

Department of the Army General Order No. 29, dated 10 August 1960, placed The Institute of Heraldry under the control of the Quartermaster General of the Army, effective 1 September 1960. The Adjutant General assumed responsibility of the institute in 1962, when the Office of the Quartermaster General ceased to exist because the Army reorganized. In 1987, another realignment subordinated the institute to the U.S. Total Army Personnel Command (present-day U.S. Army Human Resources Command). In April 1994, The institute moved from Cameron Station to Fort Belvoir, Virginia. In October 2004, another realignment assigned responsibility for the institute to the Office of the Administrative Assistant to the Secretary of the Army, Headquarters, Department of the Army.

== Roles ==
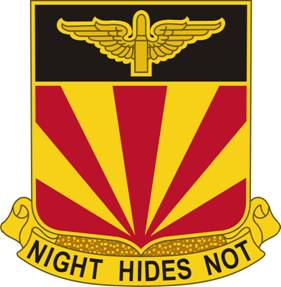
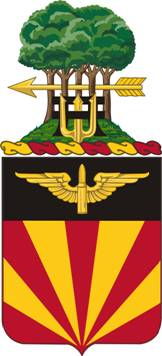
The distinctive insignia of the 56th Air Defense Artillery (ADA) compared to its coat of arms.
- Approve designs for distinctive unit insignia (DUI), Regimental Distinctive Insignia (RDI), shoulder sleeve insignia (SSI) and organizational beret flashs and background trimmings, as authorized by Army Regulation 670-1.
- Authorize heraldic items for U.S. Army Organizations.
- Authorize the use of Army insignia when incorporated into items for commercial sale.
- Design and develop insignia (branch, grade, unit) seals, medals, badges, band regalia and flags.
- Establish Army policy for flag design and display.
- Fabricate three-dimensional display items.
- Monitor the Heraldic Quality Control System in accordance with Army Regulation 672-8, to ensure heraldic items are manufactured according to government specifications or purchase descriptions.
- Prepare heraldic item specifications and provide engineering support to manufacturers.
- Provide manufacturers with government-loaned tools and specifications for heraldic items.

== Armorial achievement of the Institute ==
Coat of arms of The Institute of Heraldry, U.S. Army
Notes The coat of arms for The Institute of Heraldry was granted by Secretary of the Army Stanley Resor on 27 June 1966. Adopted 1966 Crest On a wreath Or and Gules, a griffin rampant of the first. Escutcheon Or a chevron Gules, on a chief Sable a label of the first. Motto AEGIS FORTISSIMA HONOS (Latin for "Honor is the strongest shield") Other elements Flanking the crest two banners, the staffs of light brown with silver finials and ferrules passing behind the shield and extending below the motto scroll, the dexter banner Or bordered compony of the like and Azure, charged with a mullet of the last voided Argent; the sinister banner Or bordered compony of the like and Gules, charged with a tudor rose barbed and seeded Vert. Symbolism The red chevron refers to the military which supports and is under the civil jurisdiction of the Federal Government of the United States represented by the label, the three points alluding to the Executive, Legislative and Judicial Branches. The Label is also indicative of The Institute of Heraldry being the direct descendant (offspring) of the heraldic activity initially created in 1919 under the General Staff, United States Army, in 1924 transferred to the Quartermaster General, and in 1962 reassigned to the Adjutant General. Furthermore, the label alludes to The Institute of Heraldry as being the only heraldic activity in the United States which is officially comparable to the heraldic institutions of the old world and which continues the art and science of heraldry under its long established traditional and historic rules.
