= Vincent Russo =

Vincent Russo may refer to:

- Vince Russo (born 1961), American author, professional wrestling booker and pundit
- Vincent M. Russo (born 1930), United States Army general
