= Robert T. Dail =

United States Army general

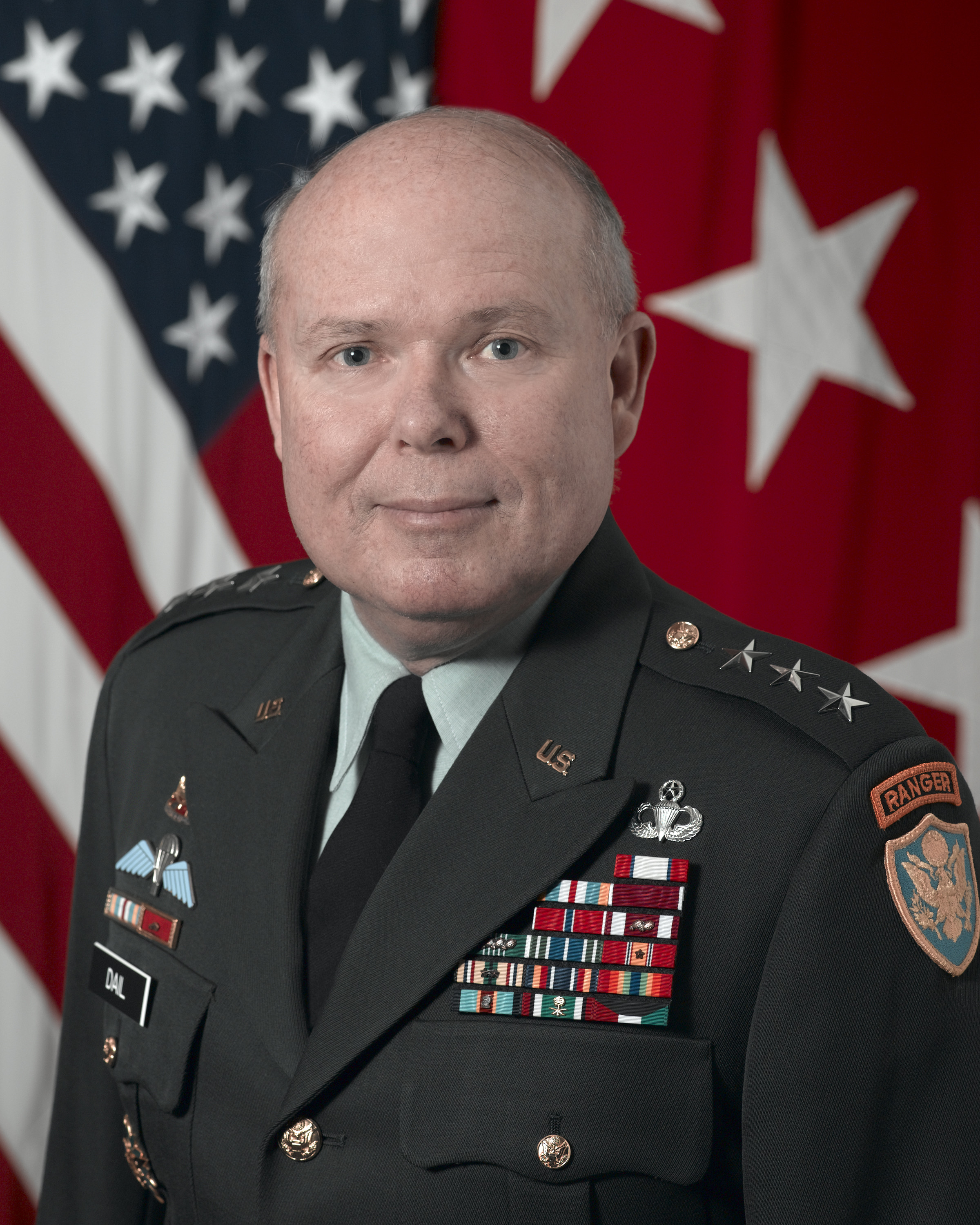
- Lieutenant General Robert T. Dail, USA; 15th Director of the Defense Logistics Agency
- Born: January 14, 1953 (age 73); Norfolk, Virginia, U.S.
- Education: University of Richmond
- Military career
- Allegiance: United States
- Branch: United States Army
- Service years: 1975–2008
- Rank: Lieutenant General
- Commands: Defense Logistics Agency
- Conflicts: Operation Desert Storm; Operation Desert Shield
- Awards: Defense Distinguished Service Medal; Army Distinguished Service Medal; Legion of Merit; Bronze Star Medal

Robert Thomas Dail (born January 14, 1953) is a retired United States Army lieutenant general.

He was born in Norfolk, Virginia.

Military offices
Preceded by Gary H. Hughey	Deputy Commander of the United States Transportation Command; 2004–2006	Succeeded by Ann E. Rondeau
Preceded by Keith W. Lippert	Director of the Defense Logistics Agency; 2006–2008	Succeeded by Alan S. Thompson
