= Defense Logistics Agency =

Combat support agency in the United States Department of Defense

- The Defense Logistics Agency's emblem

Agency overview
- Formed: 1961; 65 years ago
- Headquarters: Fort Belvoir, Virginia, U.S.
- Employees: 26,000
- Agency executives: Lt Gen David J. Sanford, U.S. Air Force, Director; Brad Bunn, Vice Director
- Parent department: Office of the Assistant Secretary of Defense for Sustainment
- Website: dla.mil

The Defense Logistics Agency (DLA) is a combat support agency in the United States Department of Defense. The agency is staffed by more than 26,000 civilian and military personnel throughout the world. Located in 48 states and 28 countries, DLA provides supplies to the military services and supports their acquisition of weapons, fuel, repair parts, and other materials. The agency also disposes of excess or unusable equipment through various programs.

Through other U.S. federal agencies, DLA also provides relief supplies to victims of natural disasters and humanitarian aid to refugees and internally displaced persons.

== Organization ==
DLA is headquartered in Fort Belvoir, Virginia. It contains numerous offices responsible for supporting the overall agency.

The agency has several major subordinate activities operating in the field:

- DLA Disposition Services, based in Battle Creek, Michigan, helps the military dispose of excess items. In addition to typical military items, such as vehicles and uniforms, Disposition Services also helps the military donate computers to primary schools, through the DoD Computers for Learning program.
- DLA Distribution, headquartered in New Cumberland, Pennsylvania, transports and stores items for DoD and other customers.
- DLA Energy provides fuel for aircraft, ships, the U.S. space program, and for commercial space exploration. It has also provided helium for the U.S. Border Patrol surveillance aerostats.
- DLA Troop Support, headquartered in Philadelphia, Pennsylvania, supplies uniforms, meals, medical supplies, construction equipment, and other items to deployed military members. It also supports the U.S. Department of Agriculture and helps provide fresh fruits and vegetables for some U.S. primary schools and eligible Indian reservations.
- DLA Weapons Support (Columbus), headquartered in Columbus, Ohio, provides parts and maintenance for military ground vehicles and some ships.
- DLA Weapons Support (Richmond), headquartered in Richmond, Virginia, primarily supplies aircraft parts and expertise.

In addition to the major subordinate activities, six DLA staff elements oversee joint activities for the Defense Department. DLA Acquisition, for example, oversees the Defense National Stockpile Center through DLA Strategic Materials.

DLA also operates three full-time organizations embedded with three Combatant Commands (COCOMs) of the U.S. military: DLA CENTCOM & SOCOM, DLA Europe & Africa, and DLA Indo-Pacific.

=== Detailed organization ===
- DLA Disposition Services, in Battle Creek (MI)
  - Disposal Region - Southeast, at Naval Air Station Jacksonville (FL)
  - Disposal Region - Northeast, at Defense Supply Center, Richmond (VA)
  - Disposal Region - Mid-America, at Joint Base San Antonio (TX)
  - Disposal Region - West, at Naval Base San Diego (CA)
  - Disposal Region - Pacific, at Naval Station Pearl Harbor (PA)
  - Disposal Region - Central, at Camp Arifjan (Kuwait)
  - Disposal Region - Europe, in Kaiserslautern (Germany)
- DLA Distribution, in New Cumberland (PA)
  - DLA Distribution Albany, at Marine Corps Logistics Base Albany (GA)
  - DLA Distribution Anniston, at Anniston Army Depot (AL)
  - DLA Distribution Barstow, at Marine Corps Logistics Base Barstow (CA)
  - DLA Distribution Cherry Point, at Marine Corps Air Station Cherry Point (NC)
  - DLA Distribution Corpus Christi, at Naval Air Station Corpus Christi (TX)
  - DLA Distribution Hill, at Hill Air Force Base (UT)
  - DLA Distribution Jacksonville, at Naval Air Station Jacksonville (FL)
  - DLA Distribution Norfolk, at Naval Station Norfolk (VA)
  - DLA Distribution Oklahoma City, at Tinker Air Force Base (OK)
  - DLA Distribution Puget Sound, at Puget Sound Naval Shipyard (WA)
  - DLA Distribution Red River, at Red River Army Depot (TX)
  - DLA Distribution Richmond, at Defense Supply Center, Richmond (VA)
  - DLA Distribution San Diego, at Naval Base San Diego (CA)
  - DLA Distribution San Joaquin, at Defense Distribution Depot San Joaquin (CA)
  - DLA Distribution Susquehanna, in New Cumberland (PA)
  - DLA Distribution Tobyhanna, at Tobyhanna Army Depot (PA)
  - DLA Distribution Warner Robins, at Robins Air Force Base (GA)
  - DLA Distribution Bahrain, at Naval Support Activity Bahrain (Bahrain)
  - DLA Distribution Europe, in Germersheim (Germany)
  - DLA Distribution Sigonella, at Naval Air Station Sigonella (Italy)
    - Detachment DLA Distribution Sigonella, at Camp Lemonnier (Djibouti)
  - DLA Distribution Pearl Harbor, at Naval Station Pearl Harbor (HI)
  - DLA Distribution Yokosuka, at Fleet Activities Yokosuka (Japan)
  - DLA Distribution Korea, at Camp Carroll (South Korea)
  - DLA Distribution Guam, in Sånta Rita-Sumai (Guam)
- DLA Energy, at Fort Belvoir (VA)
  - DLA Energy Americas, in Houston (TX)
    - DLA Energy Americas West, at Naval Weapons Station Seal Beach (CA)
    - DLA Energy Americas East, in Houston (TX)
    - DLA Energy Americas North, in Anchorage (AK)
  - DLA Energy Europe & Africa, in Kaiserslautern (Germany)
  - DLA Energy Middle East, at Naval Support Activity Bahrain (Bahrain)
  - DLA Energy Pacific, at Joint Base Pearl Harbor–Hickam (HI)
    - DLA Energy East-Pacific, at Joint Base Pearl Harbor–Hickam (HI)
    - DLA Energy South-West Pacific, in Sånta Rita-Sumai (Guam) and Singapore
    - DLA Energy Japan, at Yokota Air Base (Japan)
    - DLA Energy Korea, at Camp Walker (South Korea)
    - DLA Energy Okinawa, at Camp Shields (Japan)
- DLA Troop Support, at Naval Support Activity Philadelphia (PA)
  - DLA Troop Support Europe & Africa, in Kaiserslautern (Germany)
  - DLA Troop Support Indo-Pacific, at Joint Base Pearl Harbor–Hickam (HI)
- DLA Weapons Support (Columbus), at Defense Supply Center, Columbus in Columbus (OH)
  - DLA Land Aberdeen, at Aberdeen Proving Ground (MD)
  - DLA Land & Maritime Albany, at Marine Corps Logistics Base Albany (GA)
  - DLA Maritime Barstow, at Marine Corps Logistics Base Barstow (CA)
  - DLA Maritime Mechanicsburg, at Naval Support Activity Mechanicsburg (PA)
  - DLA Maritime Norfolk, at Naval Station Norfolk (VA)
  - DLA Maritime Pearl Harbor, at Pearl Harbor Naval Shipyard (HI)
  - DLA Maritime Portsmouth, at Portsmouth Naval Shipyard (ME)
  - DLA Maritime Puget Sound, at Puget Sound Naval Shipyard (WA)
  - DLA Land Warren, at Detroit Arsenal Army Base (MI)
  - DLA Maritime Trident Refit Facility Bangor, at Naval Submarine Base Bangor (WA)
  - Forward Presence Team, at Tobyhanna Army Depot (PA)
  - Forward Presence Team, at Letterkenny Army Depot (PA)
  - Forward Presence Team, at Red River Army Depot (TX)
  - Forward Presence Team, at Anniston Army Depot (AL)
- DLA Weapons Support (Richmond), at Defense Supply Center, Richmond (VA)
  - Industrial Support Activity Cherry Point, at Marine Corps Air Station Cherry Point (NC)
  - Industrial Support Activity Jacksonville, at Naval Air Station Jacksonville (FL)
  - Industrial Support Activity Ogden, at Hill Air Force Base (UT)
  - Industrial Support Activity Oklahoma City, at Tinker Air Force Base (OK)
  - Industrial Support Activity San Diego, at Naval Base San Diego (CA)
  - Industrial Support Activity Warner Robins, at Robins Air Force Base (GA)
  - Industrial Plant Equipment & Services Facility, at Naval Support Activity Mechanicsburg (PA)
  - Depot Level Repairable Procurement Huntsville, at Redstone Arsenal (AL)
  - Depot Level Repairable Procurement Ogden, at Hill Air Force Base (UT)
  - Depot Level Repairable Procurement Oklahoma City, at Tinker Air Force Base (OK)
  - Depot Level Repairable Procurement Philadelphia, at Naval Support Activity Philadelphia (PA)
  - Depot Level Repairable Procurement Warner Robins, at Robins Air Force Base (GA)
- DLA CENTCOM & SOCOM, at MacDill Air Force Base (FL)
- DLA Europe & Africa, in Kaiserslautern (Germany)
- DLA Indo-Pacific, at Joint Base Pearl Harbor–Hickam (HI)
  - Indo-Pacific Logistics Operations Center, at Camp H. M. Smith (HI)
  - Korea Logistics Operations Center, at Camp Henry (South Korea)
  - DLA Indo-Pacific Liaison Officer, at Yokota Air Base (Japan)

== DLA Police ==
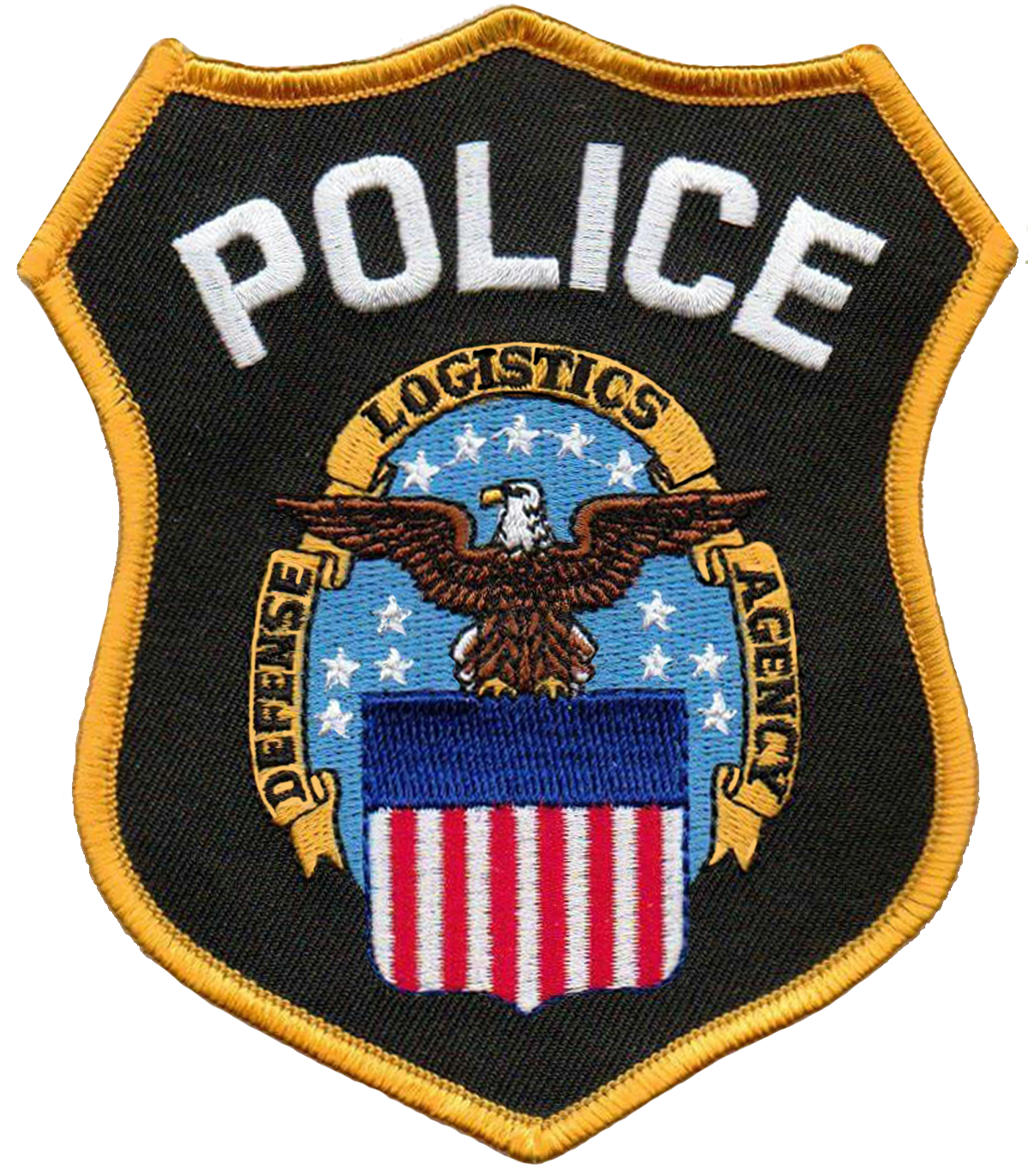
Patch of the Defense Logistics Agency Police

DLA has its own police department that provides police services (patrol, minor investigations, traffic enforcement) physical security, emergency response, access control, alarm response and counter-terrorism protection.

=== Organization and training ===
DLA Police Officers are federal police officers who were trained at the Federal Law Enforcement Training Centre (FLETC) (in Georgia) or at the Army Civilian Police Academy (ACPA) (in Missouri) and then further on-the-job training.

During the first year, officers have 11 weeks of intensive training in the Uniformed Police Training Program (UPTP) (provided by the FLETC), or a 9-week course at the ACPA. Then, after graduation from FLETC, officers will continue to develop skills through additional in-service training.

=== Uniform and equipment ===
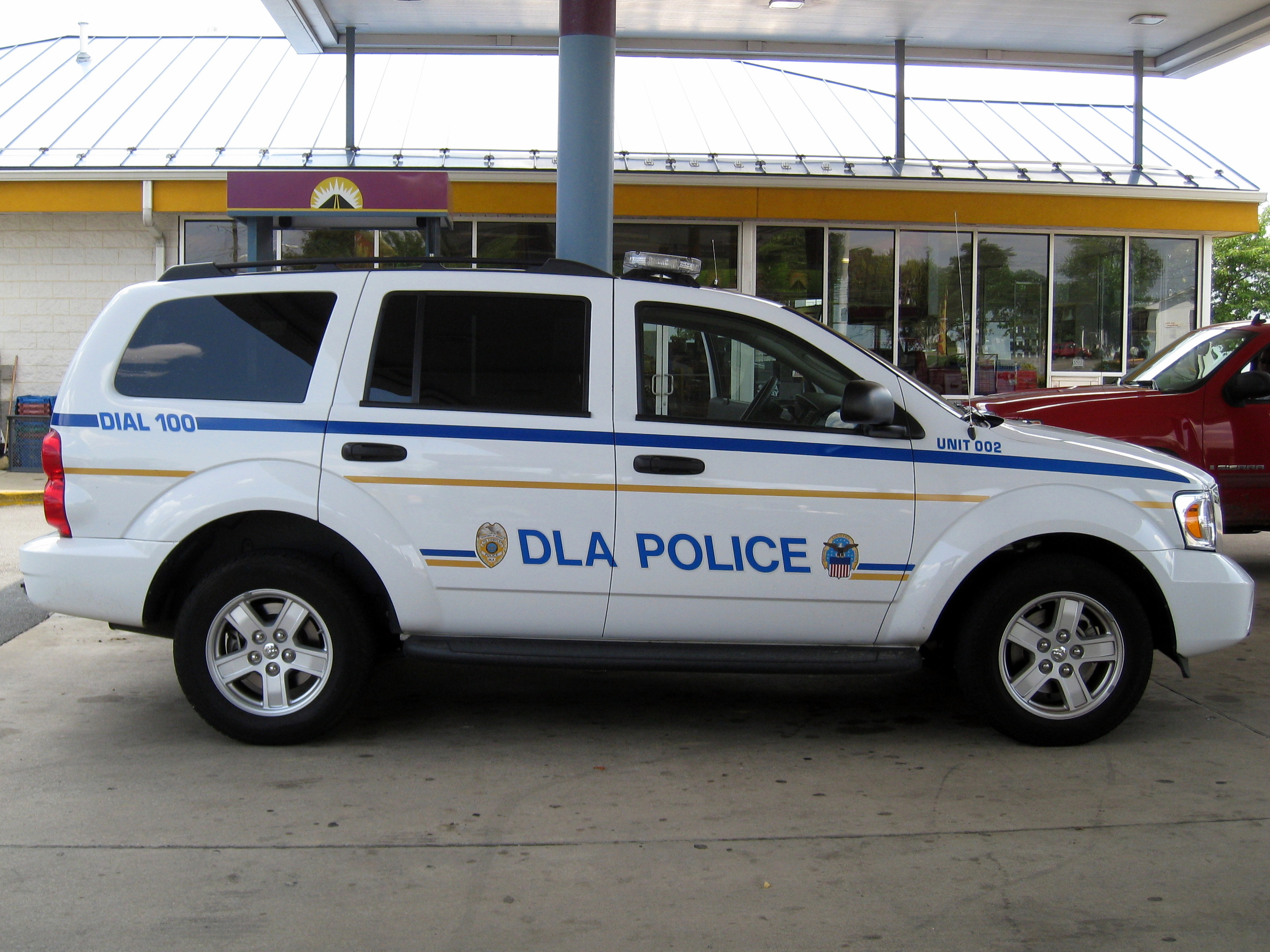
Defense Logistics Agency Police vehicle (Dodge)

DLA Police Officers wear a dark-blue typical city-style police uniform and are armed with a SIG Sauer M17 pistol along with a Benelli M4 patrol shotgun. They also have expandable batons, radios, spare magazines, and handcuffs.

== History ==
=== Origins, 1941–1954 ===
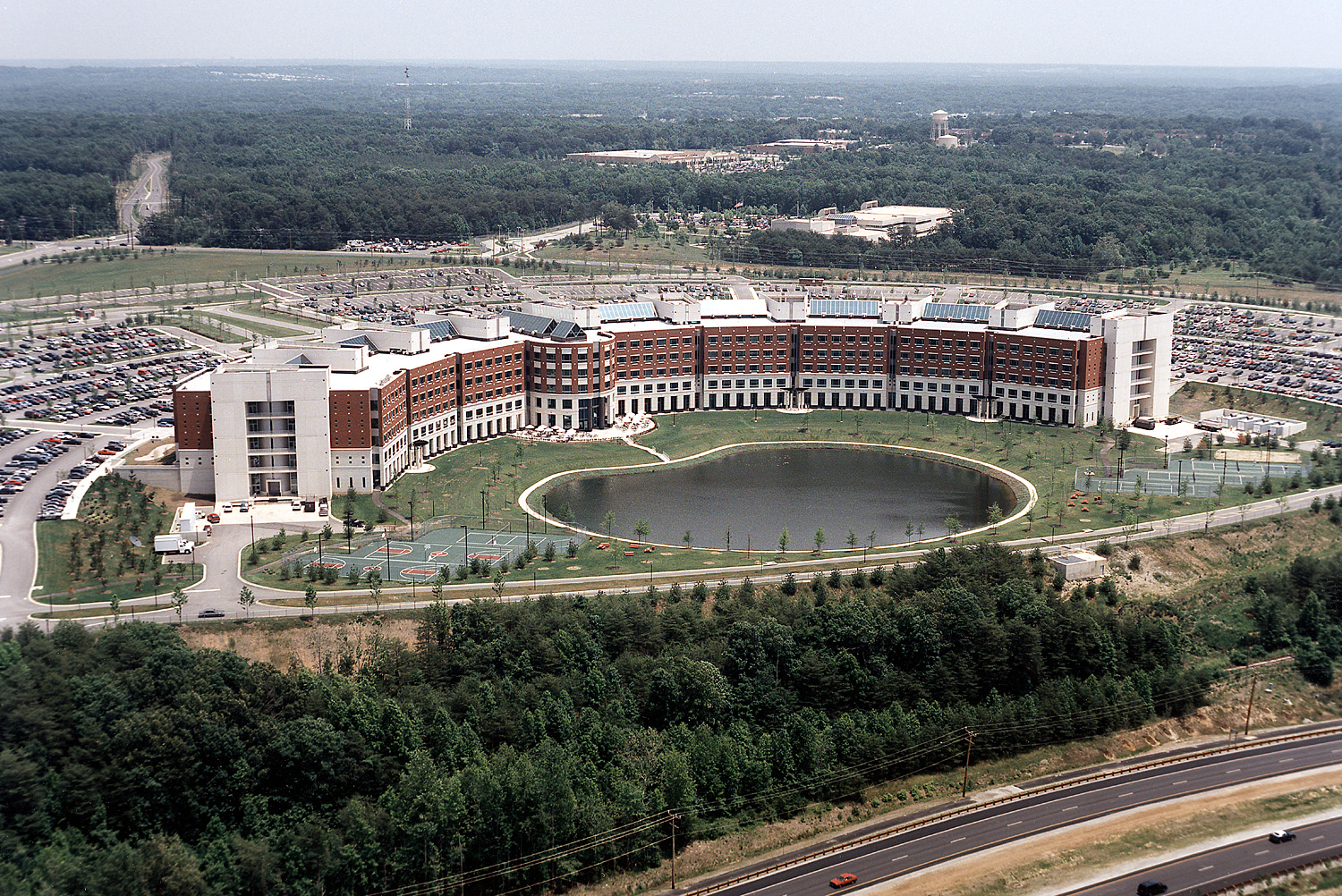
The Defense Logistics Agency headquarters building in Fort Belvoir, Virginia

The seeds of the DLA were planted in World War II, when America's military needed to get vast amounts of munitions and supplies quickly. During the war, the military services began to coordinate more when it came to procurement, particularly of petroleum products, medical supplies, clothing, and other commodities. The main offices of the Army and Navy for each commodity were collocated.

After the war, the call grew louder for more complete coordination throughout the whole field of supply—including storage, distribution, transportation, and other aspects of supply. In 1947, there were seven supply systems in the Army, plus an Air Technical Service Command, and 18 systems in the Navy, including the quartermaster of the Marine Corps. Passage of the National Security Act of 1947 prompted new efforts to eliminate duplication and overlap among the services in the supply area and laid the foundation for the eventual creation of a single integrated supply agency. The act created the Munitions Board, which began to reorganize these major supply categories into joint procurement agencies. Meanwhile, in 1949, the Commission on the Organization of the Executive Branch of the Government (Hoover Commission), a presidential commission headed by former President Herbert Hoover, recommended that the National Security Act be specifically amended so as to strengthen the authority of the Secretary of Defense so that he could integrate the organization and procedures of the various phases of supply in the military services.

The Munitions Board was not as successful as hoped in eliminating duplication among the services in the supply area. Congress became disenchanted with the board, and in the Defense Cataloging and Standardization Act of 1952, transferred the board's functions to a new Defense Supply Management Agency. The Eisenhower Reorganization Plan Number 6 (1953) abolished both this agency and the Munitions Board, replacing them with a single executive, an Assistant Secretary of Defense for Supply and Logistics. Meanwhile, the Korean War led to several investigations by Congress of military supply management, which threatened to impose a common supply service on the military services from the outside.

Integrated management began in 1958 with the formation of the Armed Forces Supply Support Center. For the first time, all the military services bought, stored, and issued items using a common nomenclature. The Defense Department and the services defined the material that would be managed on an integrated basis as "consumables", meaning supplies that are not repairable or are consumed in normal use. Consumable items, also called commodities were assigned to one military service to manage for all the services.

=== Early history, 1955–1961 ===
The pressure for consolidation continued. In July 1955, the second Hoover Commission recommended centralizing management of common military logistics support and introducing uniform financial management practices. It also recommended that a separate and completely civilian-managed agency be created with the Defense Department to administer all military common supply and service activities. The military services feared that such an agency would be less responsive to military requirements and jeopardize the success of military operations. Congress, however, remained concerned about the Hoover Commission's indictment of waste and inefficiencies in the military services. To avoid having Congress take the matter away from the military entirely, DoD reversed its position. The solution proposed and approved by the Secretary of Defense was to appoint "single managers" for a selected group of common supply and service activities.

Under a Defense directive approved by the Assistant Secretary of Defense for Supply and Logistics, the Secretary of Defense would formally appoint one of the three service secretaries as single manager for selected group of commodities or common service activities. The Army managed food and clothing; the Navy managed medical supplies, petroleum, and industrial parts; and the Air Force managed electronic items. In each category, the single manager was able to reduce his investment by centralizing wholesale stocks, and to simplify the supply process by persuading the services to adopt the same standard items. Over a six-year period, the single manager agencies reduced their item assignments by about 9,000, or 20 percent, and their inventories by about $800 million, or 30 percent. Proposals were soon made to extend this concept to other commodities. The single manager concept was the most significant advance toward integrated supply management within DoD or the military services since World War II.

The Defense Cataloging and Standardization Act led to the creation of the first Federal Catalog, completed in 1956. The federal catalog system provided an organized and systematic approach for describing an item of supply, assigning and recording a unique identifying number, and providing information on the item to the system's users. The initial catalog, containing about 3.5 million items, was a rough draft, full of duplications and errors, but it effectively highlighted the areas where standardization was feasible and necessary.

=== Defense Supply Agency, 1961–1977 ===
When Secretary of Defense Robert S. McNamara assumed office in the spring of 1961, the first generation of single managers were handling roughly 39,000 items by procedures with which the Services had become familiar. Yet, it was clear that the single manager concept, though successful, did not provide the uniform procedures that the Hoover Commission had recommended. Each single manager operated under the procedures of its parent service, and customers had to use as many sets of procedures as there were commodity managers. Secretary McNamara was convinced that the problem required some kind of an organizational arrangement to "manage the managers". On March 23, 1961, he convened a panel of high-ranking Defense officials, and directed them to study alternative plans for improving DOD-wide organization for integrated supply management, a task designated as "Project 100." The committee's report highlighted the principal weaknesses of the multiple-single-manager supply system.

After much debate among the service chiefs and secretaries, on August 31, 1961, Secretary McNamara announced the establishment of a separate common supply and service agency known as the Defense Supply Agency (DSA). The new agency was formally established on October 1, 1961, under the command of Lieutenant General Andrew T. McNamara (no relation to Robert McNamara). McNamara, an energetic and experienced Army logistician who had served as Quartermaster General, rapidly pulled together a small staff and set up operations in the worn Munitions Building in Washington, D.C. A short time later, he moved his staff into more suitable facilities at Cameron Station in Alexandria, Virginia.

When the agency formally began operations on January 1, 1962, it controlled six commodity-type and two service-type single managers: Defense Clothing & Textile Supply Center, (formerly the Philadelphia Quartermaster Depot); Defense Construction Supply Center, Columbus, Ohio; Defense General Supply Center, Richmond, Virginia; Defense Medical Supply Center, Brooklyn, New York; Defense Petroleum Supply Center, Washington, D.C.; Defense Subsistence Supply Center, Chicago, Illinois; Defense Traffic Management Service, Washington, D.C.; and Defense Logistics Services Center, Washington, D.C. Officials estimated that the consolidation of these functions under DSA and subsequent unified operations would allow them to reduce the workforce by 3,300 people and save more than $30 million each year. The results far exceeded these expectations. The agency, made up primarily of civilians but with military from all the services, would administer the Federal Catalog Program, the Defense Standardization Program, the Defense Utilization Program, and the Surplus Personal Property Disposal Program.

During the first six months, two additional single managers—the Defense Industrial Supply Center in Philadelphia and the Defense Automotive Supply Center in Detroit, Michigan—came under DSA control, as did the Defense Electronic Supply Center, Dayton, Ohio. By July 1, 1962, the agency included 11 field organizations, employed 16,500 people, and managed 45 facilities. The Defense Industrial Plant Equipment Center, a new activity, was established under the agency in March 1963 to handle storage, repair, and redistribution of idle equipment. By late June 1963 the agency was managing over one million different items in nine supply centers with an estimated inventory of $2.5 billion. On July 1, 1965, the Defense Subsistence Supply Center, Defense Clothing Supply Center, and Defense Medical Supply Center were merged to form the Defense Personnel Support Center in Philadelphia.

The DSA was tested almost immediately with the Cuban Missile Crisis and the military buildup in Vietnam. Supporting U.S. forces in Vietnam was the most severe, extensive test of the supply system in the young agency's history. The agency launched an accelerated procurement program to meet the extra demand created by the military buildup in Southeast Asia. The agency's supply centers responded in record time to orders for everything from boots and lightweight tropical uniforms to food, sandbags, construction materials, and petroleum products. Between 1965 and 1969 over 22 million short tons of dry cargo and over 14 million short tons of bulk petroleum were transported to Vietnam. As a result of support to the operations in Vietnam, DSA's total procurement soared to $4 billion in fiscal year 1966 and $6.2 billion in fiscal year 1967. Until the mid-1960s, the demand for food was largely for non-perishables, both canned and dehydrated. But in 1966, thousands of portable walk-in, refrigerated storage boxes filled with perishable beef, eggs, fresh fruits and vegetables began arriving in Vietnam, a logistics miracle.

As the buildup continued in Southeast Asia, on 1 January 1963, the agency acquired Army general depots at Columbus, Ohio, and Tracy, California, and the Navy depot at Mechanicsburg, Pennsylvania. Acquisition of Army depots at Memphis, Tennessee, and Ogden, Utah, on January 1, 1964, completed the DSA depot network.

In addition to the depot mission, the agency became responsible for administering most Defense contracts—both those awarded by DSA and by the military services. In 1965, the Defense Department consolidated most of the contract administration activities of the military services to avoid duplication of effort and provide uniform procedures in administering contracts. Officials established the Defense Contract Administration Services (DCAS) within DSA to manage the consolidated functions. The agency's new contract administration mission gave it responsibility for the performance of most defense contractors, including some new weapon systems and their components. Yet, the services retained contract administration of state-of-the-art weapon systems.

The expanded contract administration mission significantly altered the shape of DSA. The agency that had begun operations three years earlier with more than 90 percent of its resources devoted to supply operations had evolved to one almost evenly divided between supply support and logistics services. As part of a streamlining effort, in 1975, the eleven DCAS regions were reduced to nine. The following year, officials reorganized the DCAS field structure to eliminate the intermediate command supervisory levels known as DCAS districts.

As the move to consolidate Defense contracting progressed, a congressional report in 1972 recommended centralizing the disposal of DoD property for better accountability. In response, on September 12, 1972, DSA established the Defense Property Disposal Service (later renamed the Defense Reutilization and Marketing Service) at the Michigan Battle Creek Federal Center, (now renamed the Hart-Dole-Inouye Federal Center) as a primary-level field activity.

During 1972 and 1973, the agency's responsibilities extended overseas when it assumed responsibility for defense overseas property disposal operations and worldwide procurement, management, and distribution of coal and bulk petroleum products (1972), and worldwide management of food items for troop feeding and in support of commissaries (1973). One dramatic example of the agency's overseas support role was during the Middle East crisis in October 1973 when it was called upon to deliver, on an urgent basis, a wide range of vitally needed military equipment. Responsibilities for subsistence management were expanded in 1976 and 1977 with improvements required in the current wholesale management system and the assumption of major responsibilities in the DoD Food Service Program. By 1977, the agency had expanded from an agency that administered a handful of single manager supply agencies to one that had a dominant role in logistics functions throughout the Defense Department.

=== Defense Logistics Agency, since 1977 ===
In recognition of 16 years of growth and greatly expanded responsibilities, on January 1, 1977, officials changed the name of the Defense Supply Agency to the Defense Logistics Agency (DLA). The next decade was a period of continued change and expanded missions. Officials published a revised agency charter in June 1978. Major revisions included a change in reporting channels directed by the Secretary of Defense which placed the agency under the management, direction, and control of the Assistant Secretary of Defense for Manpower, Reserve Affairs, and Logistics.

As part of various organizational changes during this period, officials eliminated depot operations at the Defense Electronics Supply Center in 1979 and began stocking electronic material at depots closer to the using military activities. The Defense Industrial Plant Equipment Center was phased out in the late 1980s when responsibility for managing the Defense Department's reserve of industrial plant equipment was transferred to the Defense General Supply Center in Richmond, Virginia.

Another major mission came in July 1988 when, by presidential order, the agency assumed management of the nation's stockpile of strategic materials from the General Services Administration. Soon after, DLA established the Defense National Stockpile Center as a primary-level field activity. In 1989, the military services were directed to transfer one million consumable items to DLA for management.

The 1980s brought other changes as well. On October 1, 1986, the Goldwater-Nichols Reorganization Act identified DLA as a combat support agency and required that the selection of the DLA Director be approved by the Chairman of the Joint Chiefs of Staff. The act also directed the Office of the Secretary of Defense to study the functions and organizational structure of DLA to determine the most effective and economical means of providing required services to its customers. It helped the agency's mission evolve from functional concerns (e.g. inventory management, contract administration) to operational concerns (e.g., enhancement of materiel readiness and sustainability of the military services and the unified and specified commands).

Further implementation of reorganization recommendations, especially from the Goldwater-Nichols Act, resulted from Secretary of Defense Richard Cheney’s Defense Management Review report to the President in July 1989. The report emphasized improving management efficiencies in the Defense Department by "cutting excess infrastructure, eliminating redundant functions and initiating common business practices". After the implementation of the Defense Management Review decisions, DLA assumed some of the military services’ responsibilities, such as inventory management and distribution functions.

A Defense Management Review-directed study recommended the consolidation of DoD contract management. Although DLA had received responsibility for administering most defense contracts in 1965, the military services had retained responsibility for administering most major weapons systems and overseas contracts. On February 6, 1990, DoD directed that virtually all contract administration functions be consolidated within DLA. In response, the agency established the Defense Contract Management Command (DCMC), absorbing its Defense Contract Administration Services into the new command. The military services retained responsibility for contracts covering shipbuilding and ammunition plants. In June, however, the services’ responsibility (5,400 personnel and 100,000 contracts valued at $400 million) for managing the majority of weapons systems contracts was transferred to the Defense Contract Management Command.

=== Reorganizing for the 1990s ===
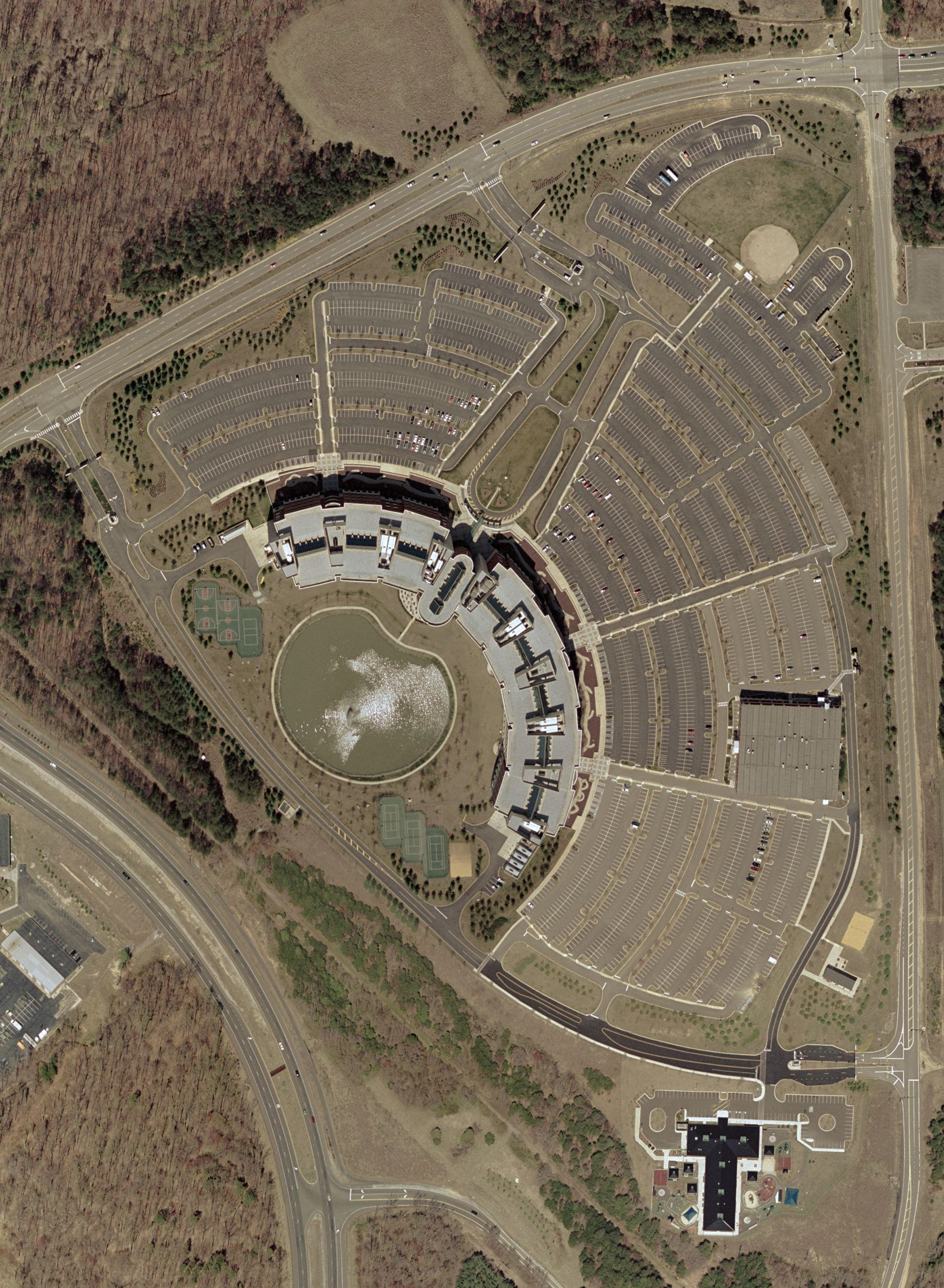
Aerial view of the McNamara Headquarters Complex

During the 1990s, the agency's role in supporting military contingencies and humanitarian assistance operations grew dramatically. Operation Desert Shield began in August 1990 in response to an Iraqi invasion of Kuwait. Soon after President George Bush announced the involvement of the U.S. military, the agency was at the center of the effort to support the deployment to the Middle East and later the war. In those first critical months, most of the supplies transported to Saudi Arabia—from bread to boots, from nerve gas antidote to jet fuel—came from DLA stock. During this operation and the subsequent Operation Desert Storm, the agency provided the military services with over $3 billion of food, clothing, textiles, medical supplies, and weapons system repair parts in response to over 2 million requisitions. The mission execution included providing supply support, contract management, and technical and logistics services to all military services, unified commands, and several allied nations. The quality of supply support that DLA provided American combat forces during these operations earned it the Joint Meritorious Unit Award (JMUA) in 1991.

DLA support continued in the Middle East long after most U.S. forces had redeployed. As part of Operation Provide Comfort, in April 1991 the agency provided over $68 million of food, clothing, textiles, and medical supplies to support a major land and air relief operation designed to aid refugees—mostly Kurds in Iraq.

DLA supported other contingency operations as well. In October 1994 DLA deployed an initial element to support operations in Haiti and established its first Contingency Support Team. In December 1995, the first element of a DLA Contingency Support Team deployed to Hungary to coordinate the delivery of needed agency supplies and services to U.S. military units deployed in Bosnia and other NATO forces. Closer to home, the agency supported relief efforts after Hurricane Andrew in Florida (1992) and Hurricane Marilyn in the U.S. Virgin Islands (1995).

An even more dominant theme for the 1990s was the agency's efforts to reorganize so that it could support the war fighter more effectively and efficiently. In August 1990, Defense Contract Management Regions Atlanta, Boston, Chicago, Los Angeles, and Philadelphia were re-designated as Defense Contract Management Districts South, Northeast, North Central, West, and Mid Atlantic respectively. Defense Contract Management Regions Cleveland, Dallas, New York City, and St. Louis were disestablished. Defense Contract Management Districts Mid Atlantic and North Central were disestablished in May 1994.

Throughout the 1990s the agency continued its effort to eliminate managerial and stockage duplication, reducing overhead costs. In April 1990 Secretary Cheney directed that all the distribution depots of the military services and DLA be consolidated into a single, unified materiel distribution system to reduce overhead and costs and designated DLA to manage it. The consolidation began in October 1990 and was completed March 16, 1992. The system consisted of 30 depots at 32 sites with 62 storage locations, which stored over 8.7 million spare parts, subsistence, and other consumable items worth $127 billion in 788 million square feet (73 km²) of storage. Until September 1997, two regional offices—Defense Distribution Region East (DDRE) in New Cumberland, Pennsylvania, and Defense Distribution Region West (DDRW) in Stockton, California, managed a vast network of distribution depots within their respective geographic boundaries. They later merged into Defense Distribution Center, New Cumberland.

The Base Realignment and Closure (BRAC) process instituted in 1993 significantly affected the way the agency organized for its contract administration and supply distribution missions. As a result of BRAC 1993, officials merged, realigned, or closed several DLA primary-level field activities. Specifically, they closed two of the five contract management districts and Defense Electronics Supply Center. Defense Distribution Depot Charleston, Defense Distribution Depot Oakland, and the Tooele Facility, Defense Distribution Depot Ogden, Utah, were disestablished. Defense General Supply Center became Defense Supply Center, Richmond. In response to BRAC 1993, in 1996 officials merged the former Defense Construction Supply Center Columbus and the former Defense Electronic Supply Center Dayton to form Defense Supply Center Columbus. On July 3, 1999, Defense Industrial Supply Center was disestablished and merged with Defense Personnel Support Center (DPSC) to form the new Defense Supply Center Philadelphia. Also on March 27, 2000, Defense Contract Management Command was renamed Defense Contract Management Agency and established as a separate agency within the DoD to operate more efficiently.

Meanwhile, DLA headquarters underwent a major reorganization. In March 1993, the agency re-engineered its headquarters to form integrated business units for Supply Management, Distribution, and Contract Management. As a result, only 6 organizations, rather than 42, would report directly to the Director. In 1995 the DLA headquarters and Defense Fuel Supply Center (renamed Defense Energy Support Center (DESC) in January 1998) moved from Cameron Station to Fort Belvoir, Virginia. In October 1996, Defense Printing Services, renamed Defense Automated Printing Service (DAPS), transferred to DLA. In late December 1997 and early January 1998, the headquarters was again realigned, and the agency's Defense Materiel Management Directorate became Defense Logistics Support Command under Rear Admiral David P. Keller.

In November 1995, DLA launched a $1 billion project called the Business Systems Modernization program (BSM) to replace the Defense Department's cache of aging procurement software programs with a DoD-wide standard automated procurement system that supported electronic commerce. The EMall (electronic mall) approach to ordering supplies was developed in 1993, before many organizations were using the internet for electronic commerce. In 1996 the agency received a JMUA for saving DoD and the taxpayer $6.3 billion by using EMall but a 2004 GAO report questioned the value of the program. Since its establishment in 1961, the agency has successfully standardized, procured, managed, and distributed DoD consumable items throughout the military services, thus eliminating wasteful duplication. The agency assumed a major logistics role previously performed by the military services. The reorganization, move to electronic commerce, and other changes in the 1990s better positioned the agency to support the war fighter in the next century.

== 21st century ==
=== Operations Iraqi Freedom, Enduring Freedom and Resolute Support ===
In support of Operation Enduring Freedom, DLA processed more than 6.8 million requisitions with a total value of more than $6.9 billion; provided $21.2 million in humanitarian support (3.5 million pounds of wheat, 49,000 pounds of dates, 3.8 million humanitarian daily rations and 30,000 blankets) and supplied more than 2.3 billion US gallons (8,700,000 m^{3}) of fuel.

Also, in support of Operation Iraqi Freedom, DLA processed 6.4 million requisitions with a total value of more than $6.89 billion, provided more than 180.5 million field meals, provided nearly 2 million humanitarian daily rations for displaced refugees and supplied more than 3 billion US gallons (11,000,000 m^{3}) of fuel. As action on the war front wanes, the DLA mission does not. The Agency continues to supply 100 percent of food, fuel and medical supplies, as well as most of the clothing, construction materials, and spare parts for weapons systems for the forces that remain during the reconstruction of Iraq. DLA also supports redeployments, including conducting battlefield cleanup such as removing equipment and debris and even hazardous materials.

DLA did so while employing only 26,000 people, down from 65,000 workers in 1992. The Agency's military force includes slightly more than 500 on active duty with the Army, Navy, Air Force and Marines, along with nearly 800 reservists.

Two DLA civilian employees have been killed by hostile fire while deployed in theater as volunteers. On Sept. 16, 2014, DLA employee Stephen Byus, 39, of Reynoldsburg, Ohio, was killed by a suicide bomber in Kabul. On June 8, 2015, DLA employee Krissie Davis, 54, of Talladega, Alabama, was killed in a rocket attack on Bagram Airfield.

=== Domestic disaster relief ===
In the aftermath of earthquakes, tsunamis, floods, hurricanes and other natural disasters, DLA supports other U.S. federal agencies with supplies and personnel as requested. For domestic disasters, DLA supports the Federal Emergency Management Agency, the U.S. Forest Service (to support wilderness firefighting), the U.S. Coast Guard, and others. For disasters affecting other countries, DLA primarily supports the U.S. Agency for International Development and the Department of State, as well as the COCOMs of the U.S. military (e.g., U.S. Southern Command).

In 2005, DLA's domestic disaster support amounted to $409 million, with Hurricanes Katrina and Rita relief commanding the vast majority of the resources. As Hurricane Katrina began developing into a Category 5 hurricane, DLA prepared to step in, directing command and control functions through the DLA Logistics Operations Center. It deployed about 19 people to work positions in support of hurricane relief efforts. The response to Hurricanes Katrina and Rita was massive, and it spotlighted DLA's continuing, if increasing, role in domestic storm relief.

DLA provided the Federal Emergency Management Agency (FEMA) with MREs and other supplies for evacuees and personnel fighting the October 2007 California wildfires.

In 2008, DLA provided humanitarian supplies in support of Hurricanes Gustav and Ike relief efforts in Texas and along the Gulf Coast.

In 2017, DLA assisted the FEMA in providing supplies and personnel to support relief to Americans affected by Hurricanes Harvey, Irma and Maria.

Since February 2020, DLA has been supporting relief efforts related to the COVID-19 pandemic. In addition to protecting military personnel, the agency provided personal protective equipment (PPE) to FEMA and the Department of Health and Human Services. It has also supplied military hospitals deployed to hotspots across the country with parts, medical materiel, and fuel.

=== International relief ===
==== 2004 Indian Ocean tsunami ====
The tsunami waves that struck December 26, 2004, and killed thousands in South Asia was the largest earthquake to strike since 1964. The 8.9-magnitude quake hit off the coast of Indonesia and triggered extremely large waves that brought massive flooding, damage, and loss of life in the region.

The initial call came on December 30 warning DSCP's Medical Directorate it would be getting about 1,400 line requisitions as soon as the orders were official for the USNS Mercy hospital ship to deploy and by mid-January 2005, DSCP had filled about 1,100 lines for the 1,000-bed hospital ship that was deployed for several months in the Indian Ocean. Altogether for tsunami support, DLA processed 8,789 requisitions for $53 million.

==== 2005 Kashmir earthquake ====
A 7.6-magnitude earthquake struck Pakistan, India, and Afghanistan at 8:50 a.m. local time on October 8, 2005. The epicenter was located near Muzaffarabad, the capital of Pakistani-administered Kashmir, about 60 miles (97 km) north-northeast of Islamabad.

A total of 14 commercial Boeing 747s were required to move the 506 air pallets built by DLA and shipped to Pakistan. The last shipment arrived November 23. In addition to these materials, 9,720 cases of Halal meals, or 116,640 individual pre-packaged meals, produced through DSCP for the Combined Forces Land Component Command, were sent to Pakistan to provide immediate feeding to refugees and survivors. The Pakistan earthquake relief effort continued throughout the winter.

==== 2010 Haiti earthquake ====
Following the devastating earthquake in Haiti in January 2010, DLA provided humanitarian support to Haiti, including 2.7 million Meals, Ready-to-Eat (MREs).

==== 2011 Japan earthquake ====
DLA provided humanitarian support to Japan in wake of the 9.0-magnitude earthquake and tsunami in March 2011 by supplying fuel for Japanese helicopters conducting search and rescue operations, in addition to providing diapers, blankets, medical supplies, food, MREs, and water.

==== 2014 Ebola outbreak in West Africa ====
In 2014, civilian and military employees of DLA deployed to Liberia as part of Operation United Assistance, to help African countries deal with an outbreak of ebola.

==== 2015–2018 support to Syrian refugees ====
DLA has, at the instruction of the DoD and Congress, supported the provision of relief supplies to refugees and internally displaced persons in the Middle East.

==== 2016 Haiti hurricane ====
In 2016, DLA personnel deployed to Haiti to assist in humanitarian assistance in the aftermath of Hurricane Matthew.

== List of directors ==
No.	Director		Term			Service branch
No.	Portrait	Name	Took office	Left office	Term length	Service branch
Director, Defense Supply Agency
1	Andrew T. McNamara	Lieutenant General; Andrew T. McNamara (1905–2002)	October 1, 1961	July 1, 1964	2 years, 274 days	U.S. Army
2	Joseph M. Lyle	Vice Admiral; Joseph M. Lyle (1912–1990)	July 1, 1964	July 1, 1967	3 years, 0 days	U.S. Navy
3	Earl C. Hedlund	Lieutenant General; Earl C. Hedlund (1916–2002)	July 1, 1967	July 31, 1971	4 years, 30 days	U.S. Air Force
4	Wallace H. Robinson	Lieutenant General; Wallace H. Robinson (1920–2013)	August 1, 1971	January 1, 1976	4 years, 153 days	U.S. Marine Corps
5	Woodrow W. Vaughan	Lieutenant General; Woodrow W. Vaughan (1918–2010)	January 1, 1976	January 1, 1977	1 year, 0 days	U.S. Army
Director, Defense Logistics Agency
5	Woodrow W. Vaughan	Lieutenant General; Woodrow W. Vaughan (1918–2010)	January 1, 1977	July 1, 1978	1 year, 181 days	U.S. Army
6	Gerald J. Post	Lieutenant General; Gerald J. Post (1925–2003)	August 1, 1978	July 1, 1981	2 years, 334 days	U.S. Air Force
7	Eugene A. Grinstead Jr.	Vice Admiral; Eugene A. Grinstead Jr. (1923–2007)	July 1, 1981	June 29, 1984	2 years, 364 days	U.S. Navy
8	Donald M. Babers	Lieutenant General; Donald M. Babers (born 1931)	June 29, 1984	July 9, 1986	2 years, 10 days	U.S. Army
9	Vincent M. Russo	Lieutenant General; Vincent M. Russo (1930–2021)	July 9, 1986	November 1988	~2 years, 305 days	U.S. Army
10	Charles P. McCausland	Lieutenant General; Charles P. McCausland (born 1935)	November 1988	July 2, 1992	~3 years, 244 days	U.S. Air Force
11	Edward M. Straw	Vice Admiral; Edward M. Straw (born 1939)	July 2, 1992	October 25, 1996	4 years, 115 days	U.S. Navy
12	George T. Babbitt Jr.	Lieutenant General; George T. Babbitt Jr. (born 1942)	October 25, 1996	May 31, 1997	218 days	U.S. Air Force
13	Henry T. Glisson	Lieutenant General; Henry T. Glisson (born 1944)	June 10, 1997	July 20, 2001	4 years, 40 days	U.S. Army
14	Keith W. Lippert	Vice Admiral; Keith W. Lippert (born 1947)	July 20, 2001	July 31, 2006	5 years, 11 days	U.S. Navy
15	Robert T. Dail	Lieutenant General; Robert T. Dail (born 1953)	August 1, 2006	November 13, 2008	2 years, 104 days	U.S. Army
16	Alan S. Thompson	Vice Admiral; Alan S. Thompson (born 1954)	November 19, 2008	November 18, 2011	2 years, 364 days	U.S. Navy
17	Mark D. Harnitchek	Vice Admiral; Mark D. Harnitchek (born 1955)	November 18, 2011	December 19, 2014	3 years, 28 days	U.S. Navy
18	Andrew E. Busch	Lieutenant General; Andrew E. Busch	December 28, 2014	May 4, 2017	2 years, 127 days	U.S. Air Force
19	Darrell K. Williams	Lieutenant General; Darrell K. Williams (born 1961)	June 16, 2017	June 8, 2020	2 years, 358 days	U.S. Army
20	Michelle C. Skubic	Vice Admiral; Michelle C. Skubic (born 1961)	July 24, 2020	February 2, 2024	3 years, 193 days	U.S. Navy
21	Mark T. Simerly	Lieutenant General; Mark T. Simerly	February 2, 2024	October 2, 2026	2 years, 242 days	U.S. Army
22	David J. Sanford	Lieutenant General; David J. Sanford	October 2, 2026	Incumbent	11 days	U.S. Air Force

== Civilian Award ==
The Defense Logistics Agency Civilian Award is a medal awarded to civilian employees of the United States Department of Defense working worldwide and supporting the logistical needs of the Department of Defense.

== See also ==
- Title 32 of the Code of Federal Regulations
- 1033 program
- Mae E. De Vincentis
