= Mae E. De Vincentis =

Former United States Department of Defense official

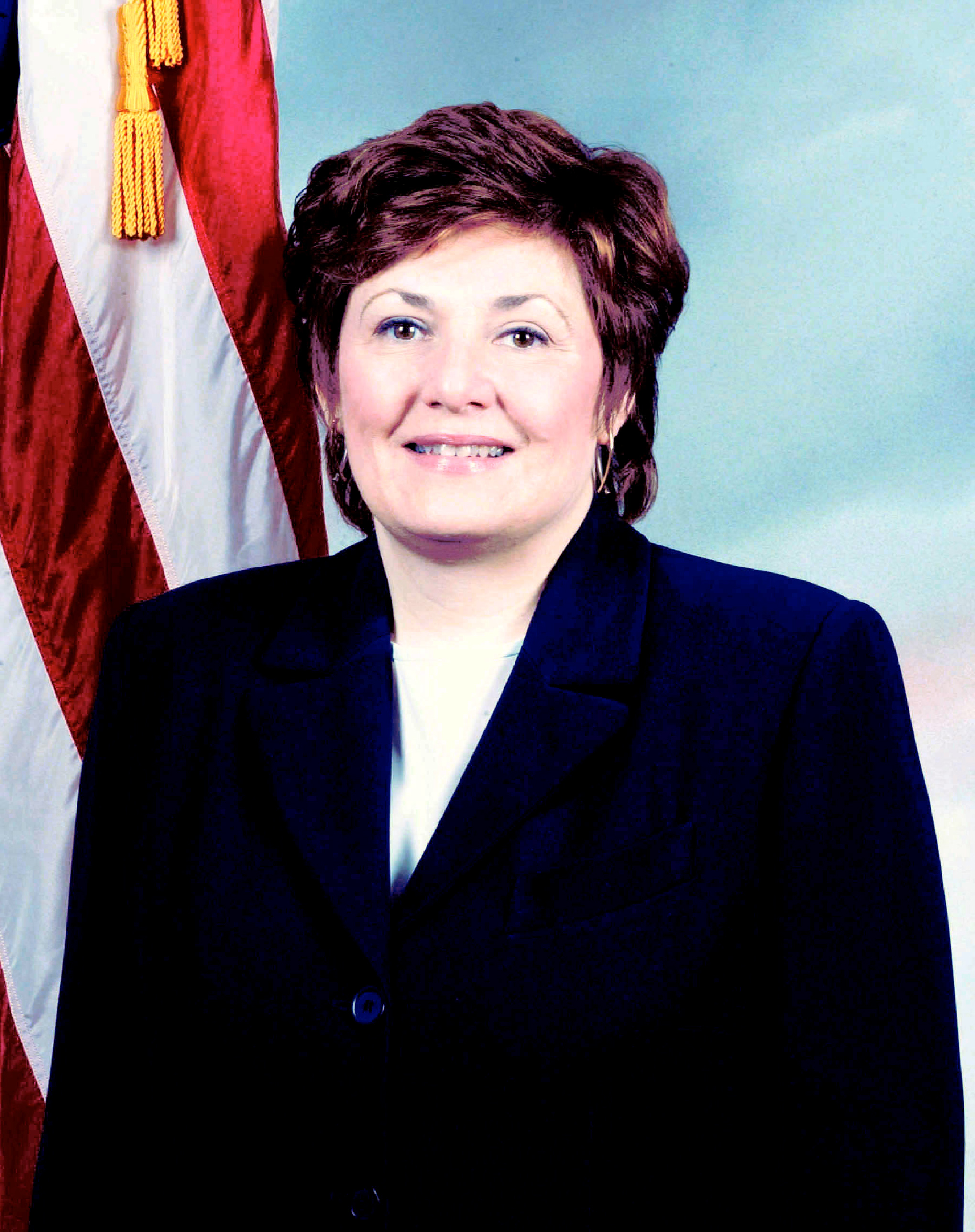
Mae E. De Vincentis

Mae E. De Vincentis is a former United States Department of Defense official and the vice director for the Defense Logistics Agency (DLA) since August 2010. DLA is a U.S. Department of Defense (DOD)’s combat logistics support agency, providing logistics to the military departments and the Unified Combatant Commands. De Vincentis was the agency's second in command until retiring from the DLA in 2012 and subsequently founding the DLA Foundation.

== Career ==
Before becoming vice director, De Vincentis was the director of Logistics Operations (J-3) at DLA. She led DLA's worldwide warfighter support mission, which provides most consumable spare and repair parts and virtually all clothing, food, medical supply and fuel items used by military forces worldwide, involving over $40 billion in annual sales of logistics materiel and services.

She was previously the director, Information Operations (J6) and chief information officer (CIO) for DLA for nine years. De Vincentis was responsible for all DLA information technology (IT) activities across 11 sites involving a staff of over 3,000, including modernization of the agency's principal business systems, sustainment of contemporary business systems, program management for acquiring and implementing major automated information systems (MAIS), information assurance, and overall IT policy guidance and operational performance. She was also responsible for DOD-wide logistics information operations that include cataloging, electronic routing of logistics transactions, a logistics customer interaction center, logistics process guidance and DOD's document services.

Her prior assignment was as the Program Executive Officer (PEO) and vice director of Information Operations (IO). As the PEO, De Vincentis had management and oversight of DLA's MAIS programs and special interest programs. As vice director for IO, she also assisted the IO director in overseeing all agency IT functions. Before becoming the PEO in early 2000, De Vincentis served as executive director for Information Systems and Technology for the Defense Logistics Support Command (DLSC), at that time a major DLA subordinate command.

Prior to joining DLSC in 1998, De Vincentis held a variety of leadership positions in contracting, logistics and information technology at the then-Defense Supply Center Philadelphia (DSCP), currently called "DLA Troop Support".

== Personal life, education, and honors ==
De Vincentis attended Temple University where she received both her Bachelor of Arts and master's degrees in Business Administration. She is a member of the Senior Executive Service and the Defense Acquisition Corps, and has served on a variety of DOD and public/private sector councils.
