= Alan S. Thompson =

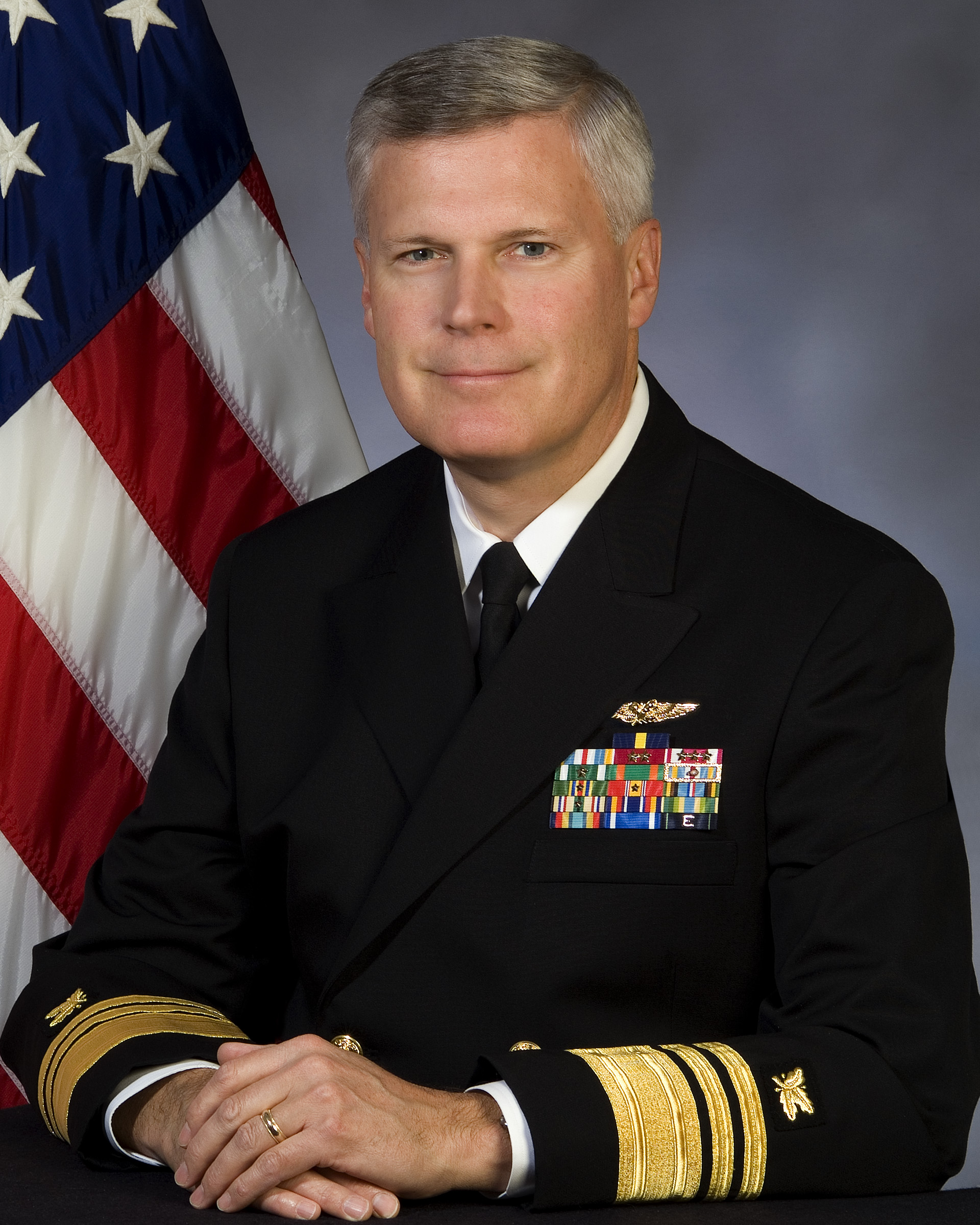
- Official portrait, 2008
- Born: 1954 (age 71–72)
- Education: University of California, Los Angeles (BA); Warrington College of Business (MBA); Columbia Business School
- Military career
- Allegiance: United States of America
- Branch: United States Navy
- Service years: 1976–2011
- Rank: Vice Admiral
- Commands: Defense Logistics Agency; Naval Supply Systems Command; Defense Supply Center
- Awards: Navy Distinguished Service Medal; Defense Superior Service Medal; Legion of Merit

Alan S. Thompson (born 1954) is a retired Vice Admiral in the United States Navy. He was commissioned via the Naval Reserve Officers Training Corps at the University of California, Los Angeles in 1976. He retired from the U.S. Navy in November 2011.

Thompson served as the Director of the Defense Logistics Agency from November 2008 until his retirement. Thompson's previous assignments included duty as Commander of the Defense Supply Center in Columbus, Ohio. Director of the Defense Logistics Agency, Commander of the Naval Supply Systems Command, and Chief of Supply Corps.

He served as the chief executive officer of HomeSafe Alliance from September 2019 to January 2024.

== Education ==
- Bachelor of Arts degree in economics, University of California, Los Angeles, Los Angeles, California
- Master of Business Administration degree, University of Florida, Gainesville, Florida
- Senior Executive Program, Columbia University, New York City

== Awards and decorations ==
U.S. military decorations
Defense Distinguished Service Medal
Navy Distinguished Service Medal
Defense Superior Service Medal
Legion of Merit w/ 2 award stars
Meritorious Service Medal w/ 2 award stars
Navy and Marine Corps Commendation Medal w/ 1 award star
Navy and Marine Corps Achievement Medal
Unit awards
Joint Meritorious Unit Award w/ 2 oak leaf clusters
Navy Unit Commendation
Navy Meritorious Unit Commendation w/ 1 bronze service star
U.S. service (campaign) medals and ribbons
National Defense Service Medal w/ 1 service star
Armed Forces Expeditionary Medal
Southwest Asia Service Medal w/ 1 campaign star
Global War on Terrorism Service Medal
Armed Forces Service Medal
Sea Service Ribbon
Non-U.S. service and campaign medals
NATO Medal

U.S. badges
Naval Aviation - Supply Corps	Naval Aviation Supply Corps insignia
	Surface Warfare Supply Corps insignia
