= Vincent M. Russo =

United States Army general (1930–2021)

Vincent Russo
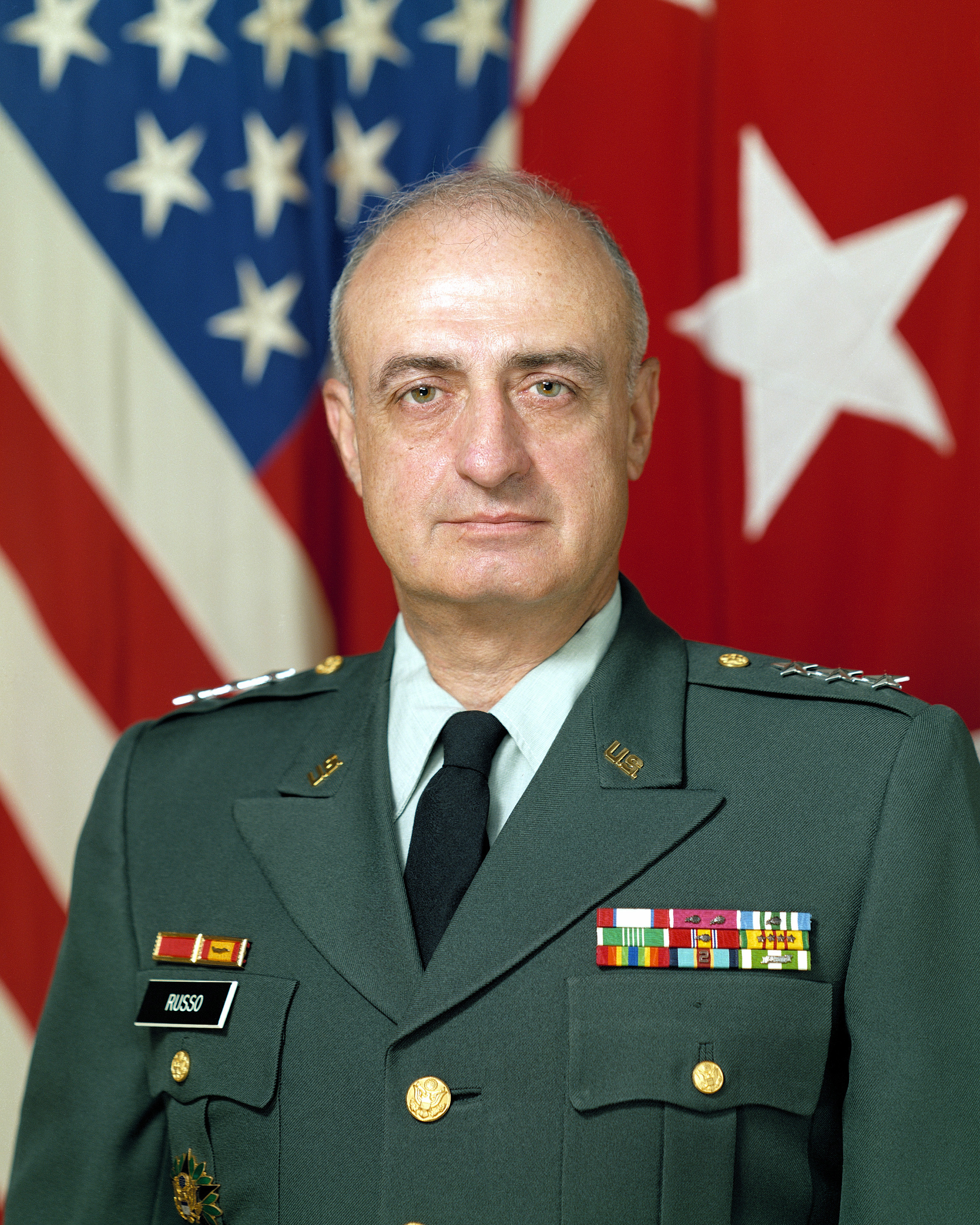
- Born: 25 August 1930; New York City, US
- Died: 10 August 2021 (aged 90); Shreveport, LA, US
- Military career
- Allegiance: United States
- Branch: United States Army
- Service years: 1952–1988
- Rank: Lieutenant general
- Commands: Defense Logistics Agency, Assistant Deputy Chief of Staff for Logistics

Vincent Mario Russo (25 August 1930 – 10 August 2021) was a lieutenant general in the United States Army. His assignments included Director of the Defense Logistics Agency and Assistant Deputy Chief of Staff for Logistics. He was an alumnus of Fordham University.
