= Cameron Station (Alexandria, Virginia) =

Former United States military installation

Coordinates: 38°48′24.48″N 77°7′12.62″W

- Alexandria, Virginia, in United States

Site information
- Type: Quartermaster Depot

Site history
- Built: 1941–1942
- Built by: Corps of Engineers
- In use: 1942–1995
- Events: World War II

Cameron Station was the location of the Defense Logistics Agency in Alexandria, Virginia (as well as the smaller Defense Contract Audit Agency), until its closure by the 1988 Base Realignment and Closure Commission. The BRAC report can be found here.
