= Office of the Administrative Assistant to the Secretary of the Army =

Senior civilian career official of the U.S. Department of the Army

Office of the Administrative Assistant to the Secretary of the Army (OAA)
- Seal

Agency overview
- Formed: 7 August 1789; 237 years ago
- Jurisdiction: United States Army
- Headquarters: The Pentagon, Arlington County, Virginia, U.S.
- Agency executive: Mr. Matthew L. Sannito, Administrative Assistant to the Secretary of the Army
- Parent agency: United States Department of the Army
- Child agency: U.S. Army Headquarters Support Agency (HSA)
- Website: www.army.mil/oaa

The Office of the Administrative Assistant to the Secretary of the Army (OAA) has a primary mission, as specified in Title 10 of the United States Code and reiterated in General Orders and Regulations, to provide direct administrative and management support to Headquarters, Department of the Army (HQDA), and enterprise-level services to Army-wide organizations.

== History ==
In 1789 Congress enacted legislation that provided for a Chief Clerk to assist the Secretary of War. As the United States grew, the duties and responsibilities for the Office of the Chief Clerk also grew. The associated bodies significantly expanded and the title changed. The office is known today as the Office of the Administrative Assistant (OAA) to the Secretary of the Army.

=== Function ===
The Office of the Administrative Assistant (OAA) provides direct administrative and management support to HQDA and enterprise level services to Armywide organizations.

== Organizational structure ==
OAA has two principal components and a multitude of sub-components shown below.

- Administrative Assistant to the Secretary of the Army
- United States Army Headquarters Support Agency (HSA)
  - Human Resource Management Directorate
  - Equal Employment Opportunity Directorate
  - Special Programs Directorate
  - Army Space and Facilities Management Directorate
  - Resource Services Directorate
  - Security, Protection and Safety Directorate
  - Army Executive Dining Facility

== See also ==
- List of positions filled by presidential appointment with Senate confirmation
- Title 10 of the United States Code
