= Defense Supply Center, Columbus =

Military installation in the United States

Coordinates: 39.9746°N 82.8944°W

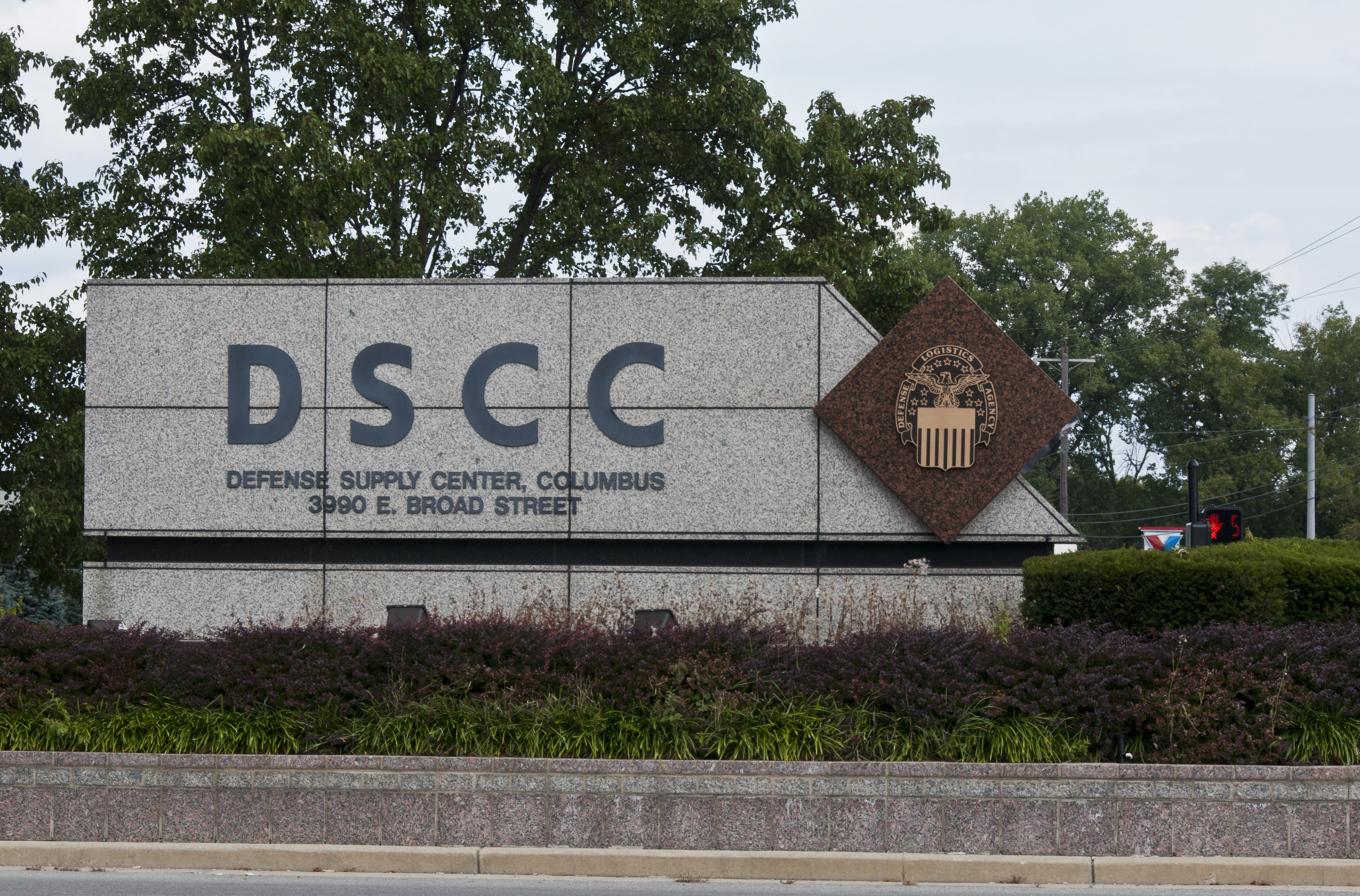
Sign at main entrance

The Defense Supply Center, Columbus (DSCC) is a major logistics installation of the Defense Logistics Agency (DLA) located in Whitehall, Ohio, near Columbus. The installation serves as the headquarters of DLA Land and Maritime and is also home to major offices of the Defense Finance and Accounting Service (DFAS).

The base has been affected several times by the United States Base Realignment and Closure program. It is located in the Columbus, Ohio suburb of Whitehall. The DSCC has a historical marker. The base was opened in 1918.

The installation was affected by multiple rounds of the Base Realignment and Closure (BRAC) process. Recommendations made by the 1993 BRAC Commission led to the consolidation of the Defense Construction Supply Center in Columbus and the Defense Electronics Supply Center in Dayton, while subsequent BRAC actions further reorganized logistics and supply-management functions at the installation.

== History ==
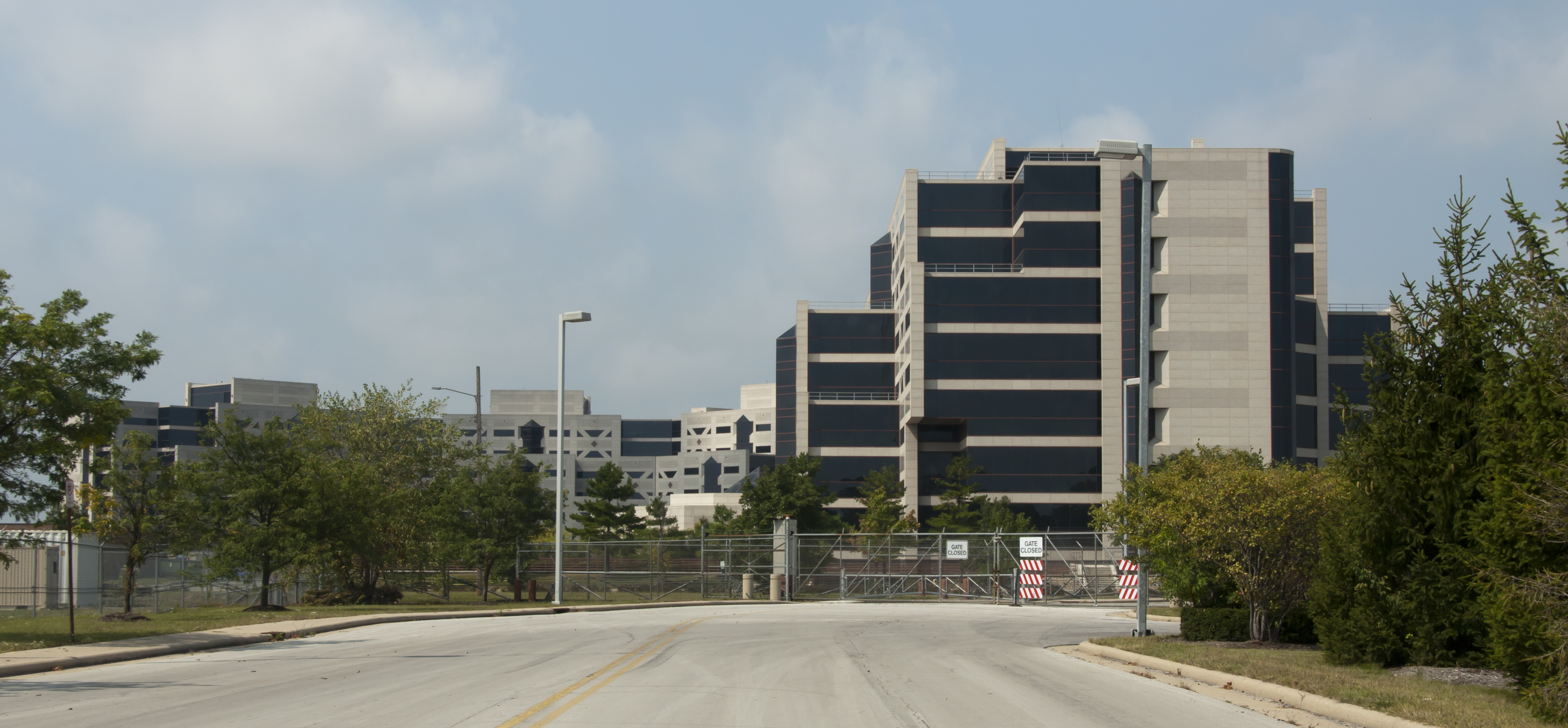
The DLA in the CSCC as seen from the East

The installation traces its origins to 1918. Prior to its construction, the site consisted largely of undeveloped swampland and farmland east of Columbus. The location was selected because Columbus was a major railroad hub with access to important transportation routes and was within 500 miles (800 km) of most of the nation's manufacturing centers. In April 1918, the U.S. Army Quartermaster Corps purchased 281 acres (114 ha) for the construction of a military supply depot, and construction began the following month.

In April 1918, the U.S. Army Quartermaster Corps purchased 281 acres (1.14 km^{2}; 114 ha) east of Columbus for the construction of a military supply depot. Construction began the following month, and by August 1918 six warehouses were receiving military supplies for storage. Those original warehouses remain in use at the installation.

The lull between World War I and World War II reduced center operations to mostly reconditioning and sale of the stockpiles which had been needed earlier to ensure the nations defense.

During World War II, the installation expanded significantly. In December 1942, the federal government purchased an additional 295 acres (1.19 km^{2}; 119 ha), increasing the depot's size to 576 acres (2.33 km^{2}; 233 ha). In March 1943, the facility, then known as the Columbus Army Service Forces Depot, became the largest joint military supply installation in the world in terms of tonnage-handling capacity. The depot employed more than 10,000 civilians and played a major role in the United States war effort. Near the end of the war, approximately 400 German prisoners of war were housed at the installation and assigned to work permitted under the Geneva Conventions.

The installation continued to support U.S. military operations throughout the Cold War and beyond. In July 1962, operational responsibility for the facility was transferred to the U.S. Army Supply and Maintenance Command. In 1963, the installation became the Defense Construction Supply Center under the Defense Supply Agency, the predecessor of the Defense Logistics Agency.

== DCSC/DESC merger ==
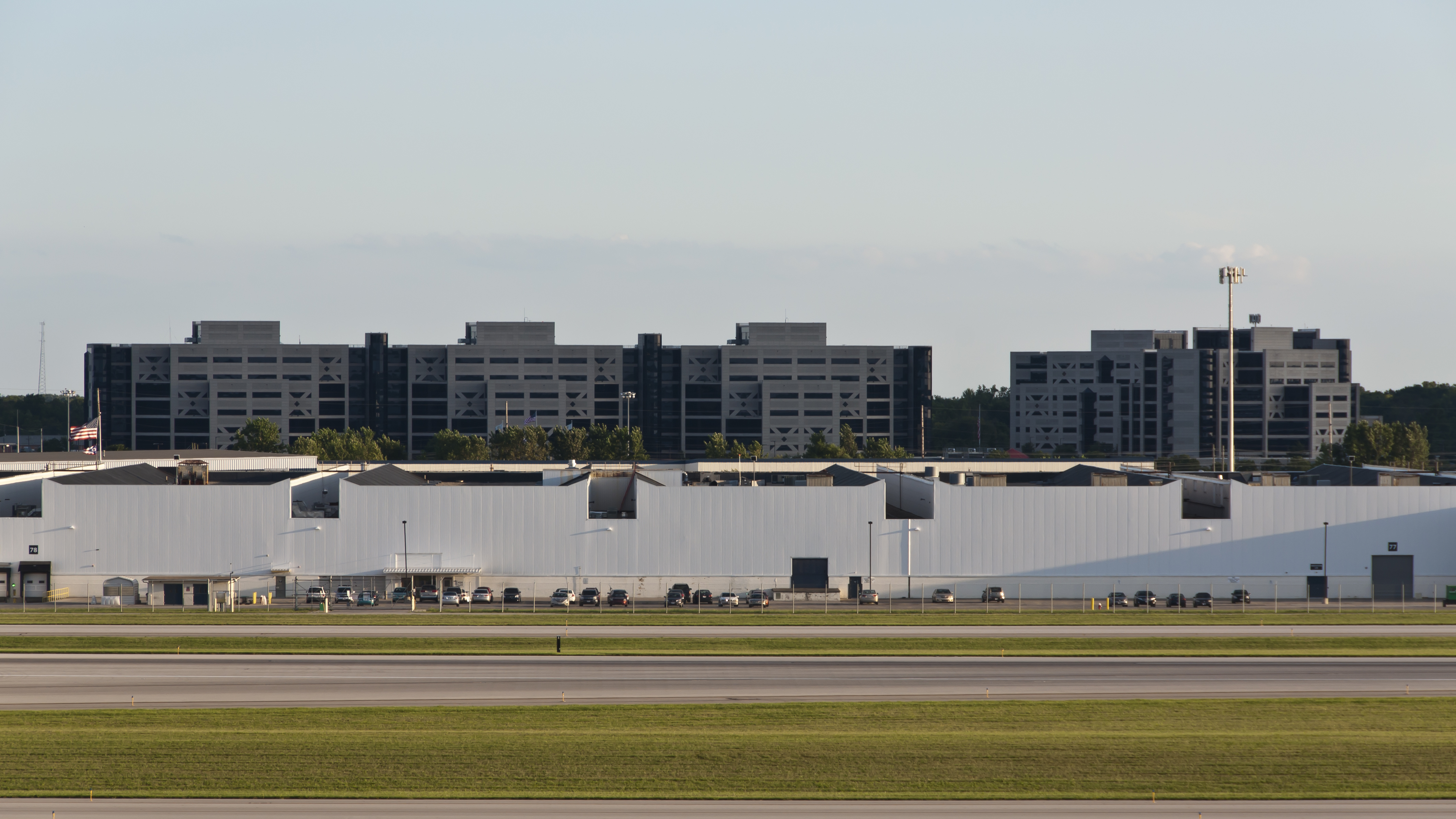
As seen from KCMH

DSCC was formed from the 1993 Base Realignment and Closure Commission which ordered merger of the former:

- Defense Construction Supply Center (DCSC) in Columbus, Ohio
- Defense Electronics Supply Center (DESC) in Dayton, Ohio

Decisions made during BRAC 95 further refined the transition toward total weapons systems management.

DSCC was renamed and reorganized in January 1996.

== Gallery ==
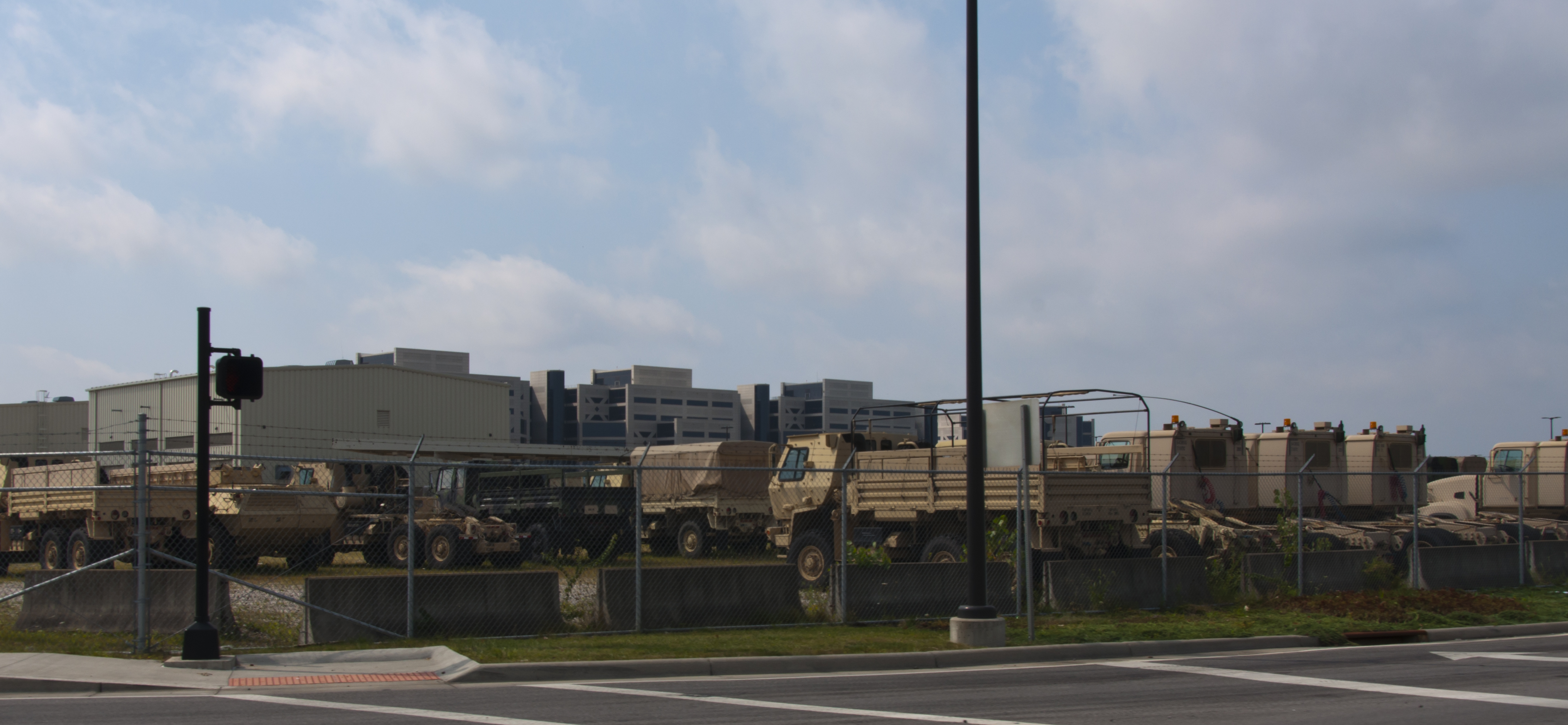

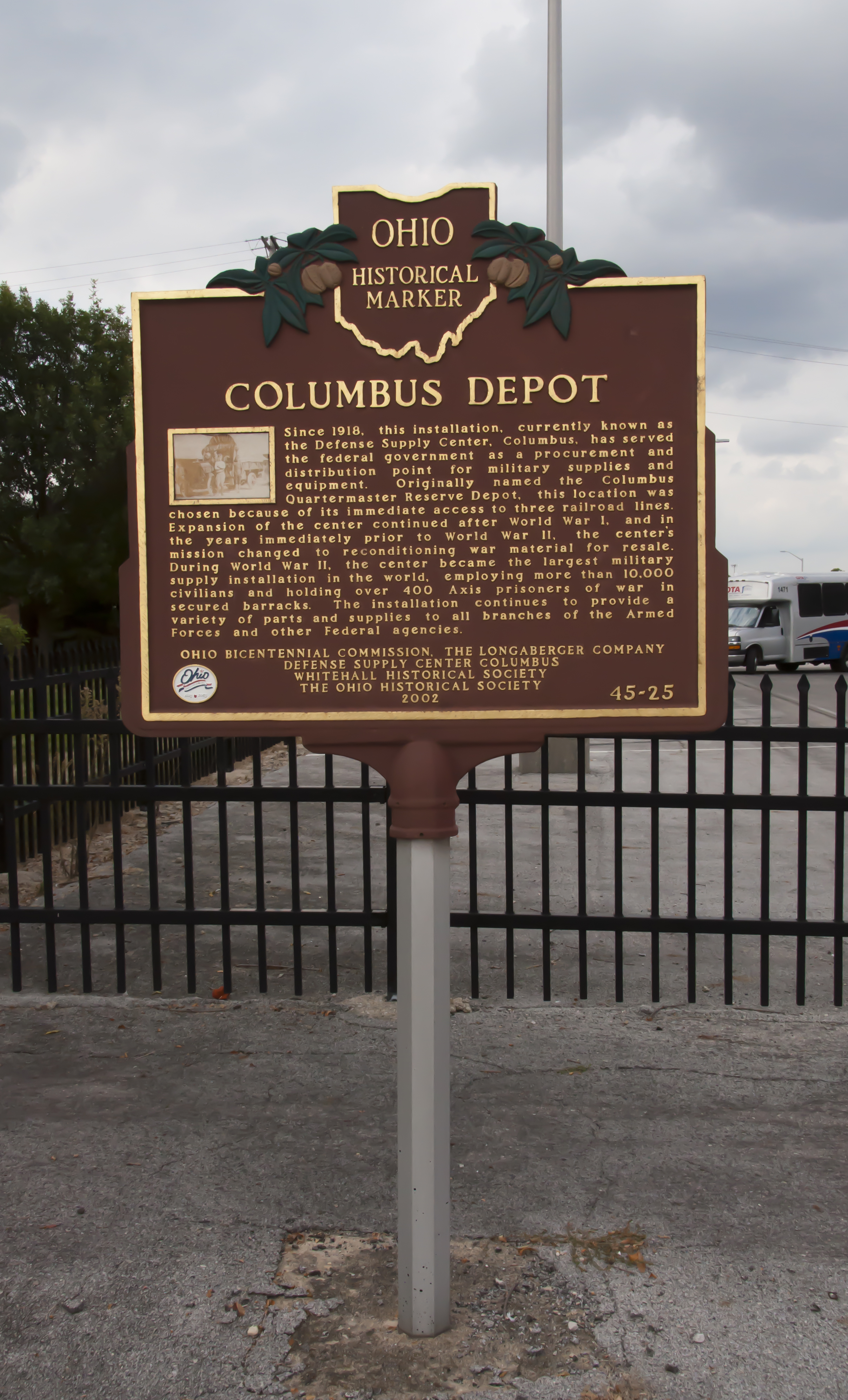
Columbus Depot Historical Marker

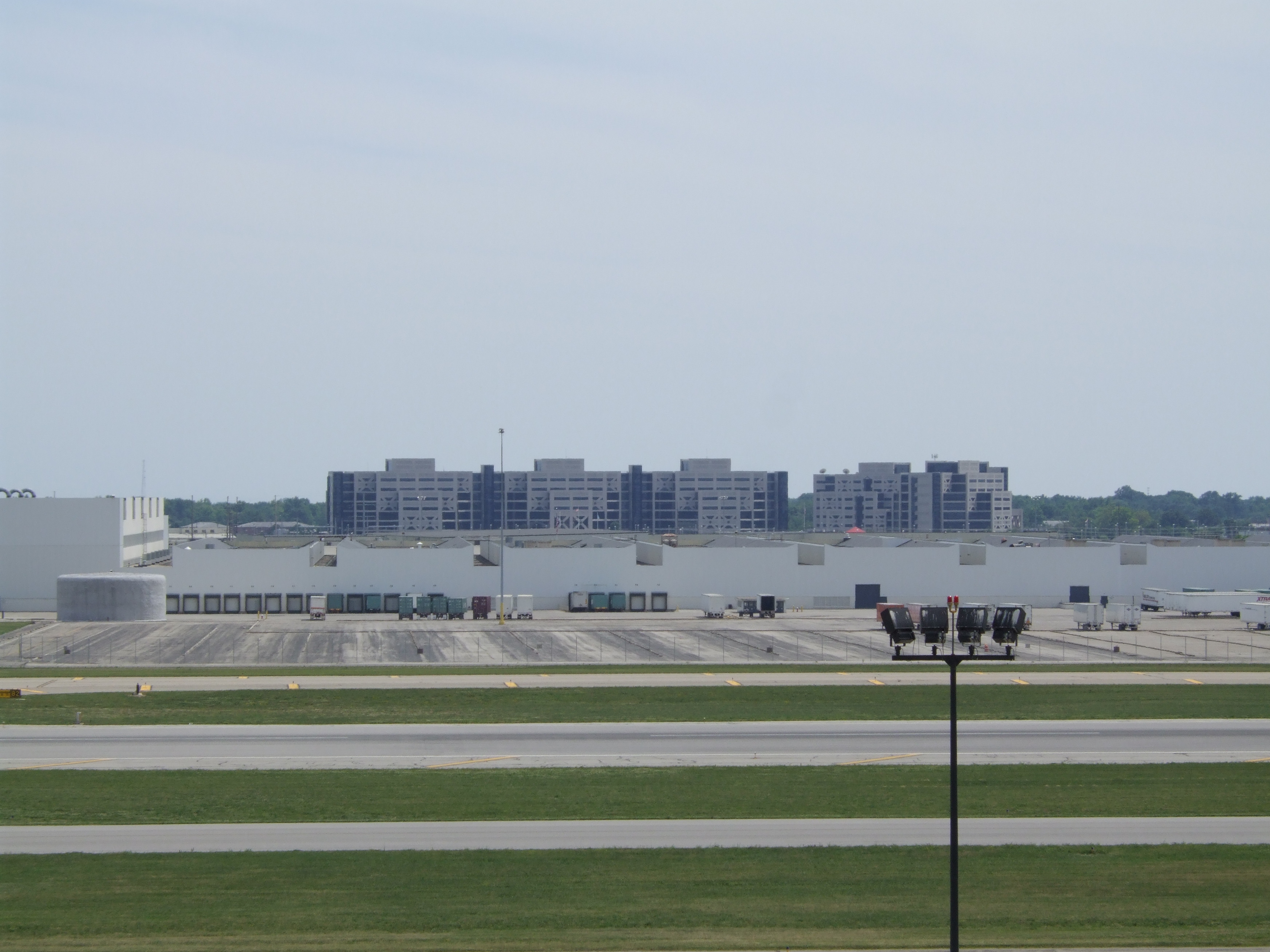
Main buildings as viewed from John Glenn Columbus International Airport

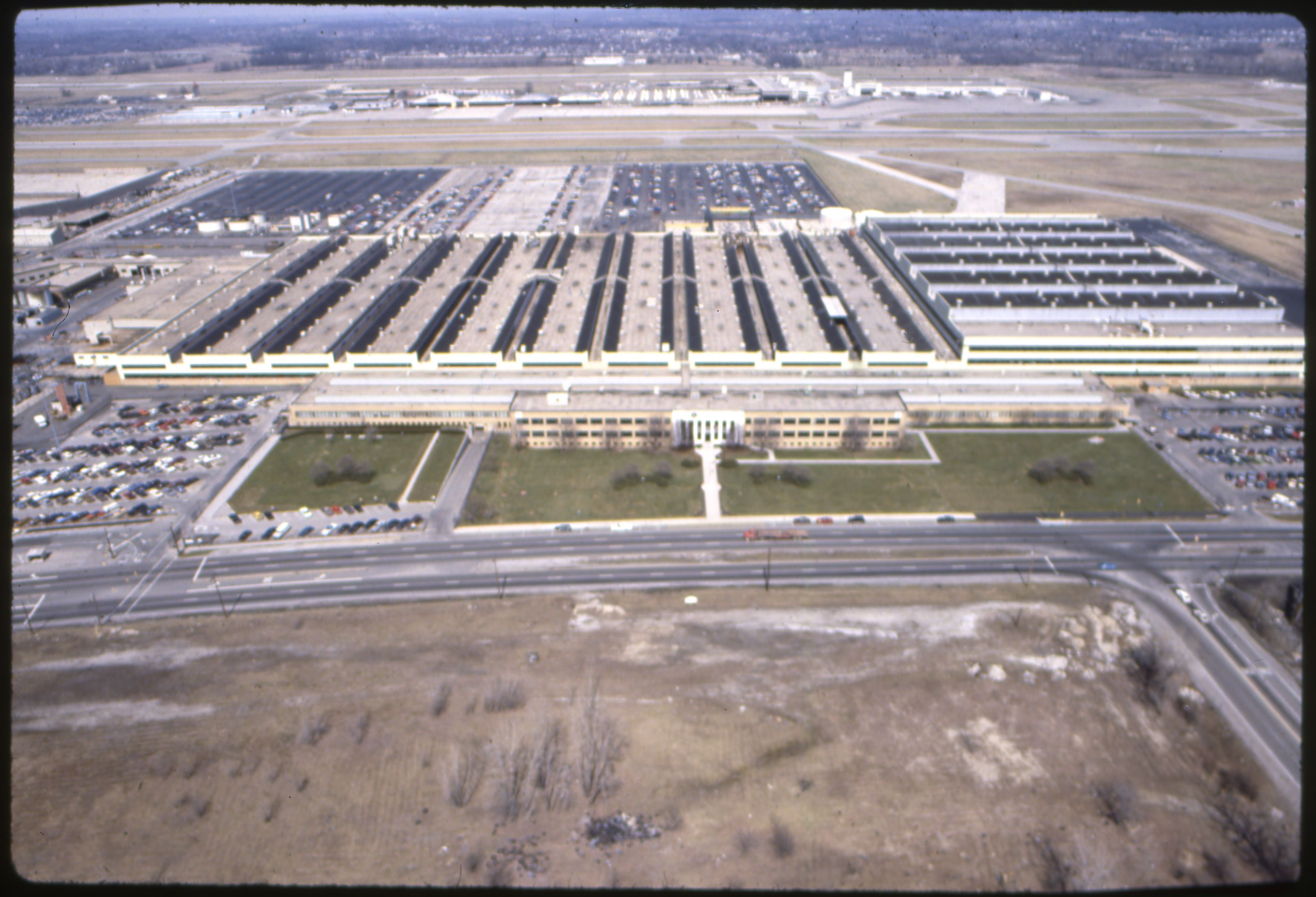
Defense Accounting and Finance Service building c. 1980s
