= Title 32 of the Code of Federal Regulations =

Rules regarding U.S. national defense

CFR Title 32 – National Defense is one of 50 titles composing the United States Code of Federal Regulations (CFR). Title 32 is the principal set of rules and regulations issued by federal agencies of the United States regarding national defense. It is available in digital and printed form and can be referenced online using the Electronic Code of Federal Regulations (e-CFR).

== Structure ==
The table of contents, as reflected in the e-CFR updated February 28, 2014, is as follows:

Volume	Chapter	Parts	Regulatory Entity
1	I	1-190	Office of the Secretary of Defense
2		191–399	Office of the Secretary of Defense
3	V	400-629	Department of the Army
4		630-699	Department of the Army
5	VI	700-799	Department of the Navy
6	VII	800–1099	Department of the Air Force
	XII	1200–1299	Defense Logistics Agency
	XVI	1600–1699	Selective Service System
	XVII	1700–1799	Office of the Director of National Intelligence
	XVIII	1800–1899	National Counterintelligence Center
	XIX	1900–1999	Central Intelligence Agency
	XX	2000–2099	Information Security Oversight Office, National Archives and Records Administration
	XXI	2100–2199	National Security Council
	XXIV	2400–2499	Office of Science and Technology Policy
	XXVII	2700–2799	Office for Micronesian Status Negotiations
	XXVIII	2800–2899	Office of the Vice President of the United States
