= Joint Region Marianas =

One of eleven naval regions of the U.S. Navy

Coordinates: 13.46403°N 144.72871°E

Commander, Joint Region Marianas U.S. Naval Forces Marianas
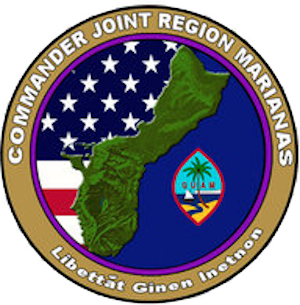
- Command insignia of Joint Region Marianas
- Active: 1999 – present
- Country: United States
- Branch: United States Navy
- Type: Region Command
- Role: Provide support and control of U.S. Navy, and support services to Army, Air Force, Coast Guard, Marine Corps and Guard personnel in the Marianas. region.
- Part of: Naval Installations Command as Joint Region Marianas; U.S. Pacific Fleet as Commander, U.S. Naval Forces Marianas
- HQ: Nimitz Hill Annex, Asan-Maina, Guam
- Nickname: JRM

Commanders
- Current commander: RDML Brett W. Mietus

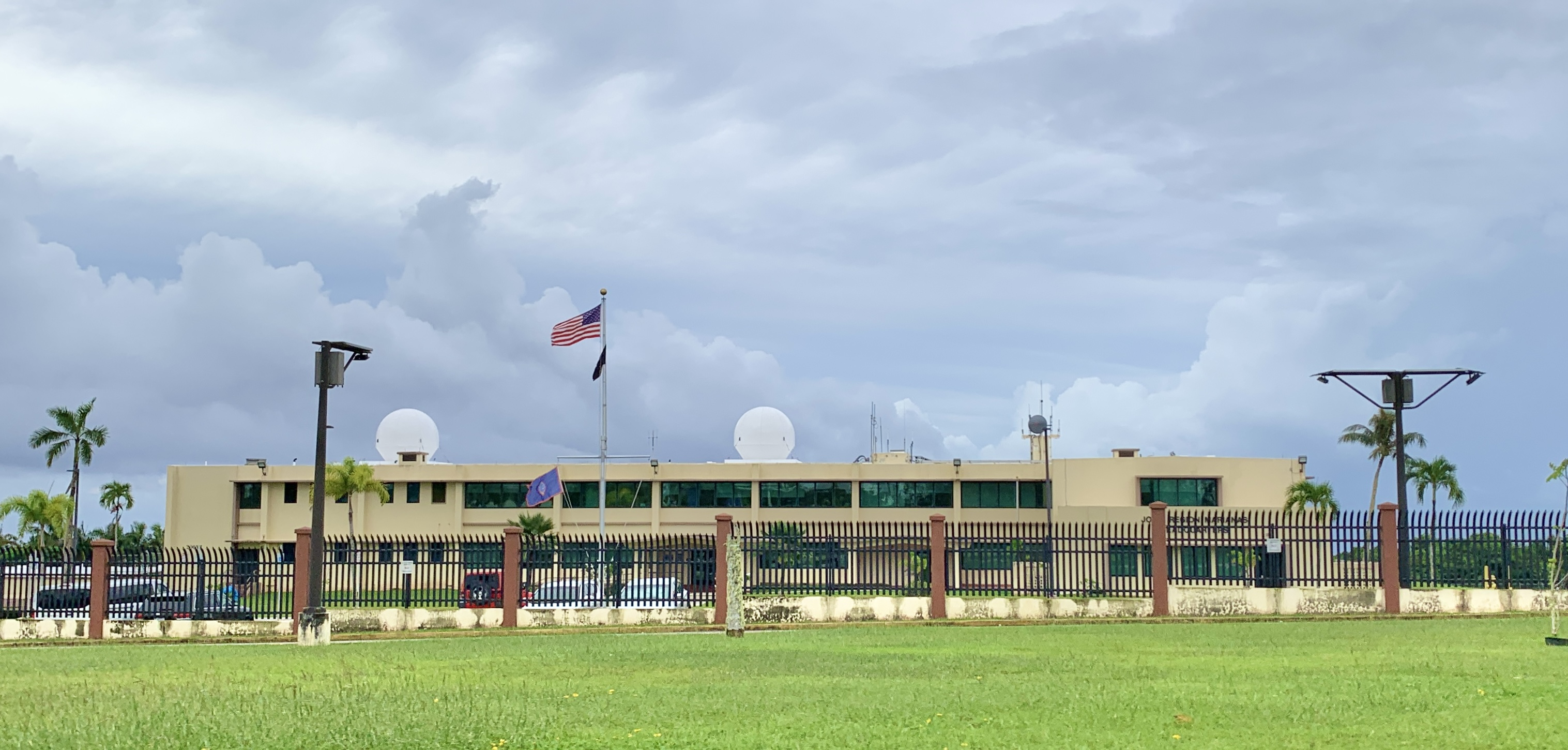
Headquarters

Joint Region Marianas' mission is to provide installation management support to all Department of Defense components and tenants through assigned regional installations on Guam and the Northern Mariana Islands in support of training in the Marianas; to act as the interface between the Department of Defense and the civilian community; to ensure compliance with all environmental laws and regulations, safety procedures, and equal opportunity policy; and perform other functions and tasks as may be assigned.

== History ==
JRM was established by congressional legislation implementing the recommendations of the 2005 Base Realignment and Closure Commission. The legislation ordered the consolidation of facilities which were adjoining, but separate military installations, into a single joint base, one of 12 formed in the United States as a result of the law.

On February 6, 2009, the Navy and Air Force held a groundbreaking ceremony for a combined headquarters at Nimitz Hill Annex. Joint Region Marianas began initial operational capability on January 31, 2009, and reached full operational capability on October 1, 2009.

A 2006 International Agreement between the US Government and the Government of Japan directed a significant reduction in the number of Marines on Okinawa. As part of that drawdown, the establishment of a Marine Corps Base Guam was planned. In 2018, the Secretary of the Navy approved the renaming of Marine Corps Base Guam in honor of the late Brigadier General Blaz. On 30 September 2020 the new base was activated as Marine Corps Base Camp Blaz. Installation management support is being provided under Joint Region Marianas. (MCBUL 5400 dtd 25FEB2020)

Under an agreement signed in November 2020, some installation support functions were returned to Air Force to allow higher funding levels to meet operational requirements. The agreement takes full effect on 1 October 2021.

Under Joint Region Marianas, Naval Base Guam (NBG), Andersen Air Force Base (AAFB) and Marine Corps Base Camp Blaz (MCB-CB) each maintain commanding officers, who will oversee their respective mission requirements and operations. Joint Region Marianas will oversee support services, policies, and resources for Navy and Marine Corps bases and some functions on AAFB. Air Force provides some support services to all Department of Defense components and tenants located on AAFB. Joint Region Marianas is located on Nimitz Hill between Naval Base Guam and Andersen AFB.

The commander of Joint Region Marianas also serves as Commander Naval Forces Marianas and as U.S. Defense Representative to Guam, Commonwealth of the Northern Mariana Islands, Republic of Palau, and Federated States of Micronesia.

== Supported installations ==
=== Naval Base Guam ===
The main base of USNB Guam, sometimes called "Big Navy" is located south of Outer Apra Harbor in Santa Rita, mostly on the Orote Peninsula. Big Navy is home of Commander Submarine Squadron 15, Coast Guard Sector Guam, and Naval Special Warfare Unit Det Guam and supports 28 other tenant commands.

It is the home base of dozens of Pacific Command, United States Pacific Fleet, and Seventh Fleet units. Submarine Squadron 15 consists of Los Angeles-class submarines USS Oklahoma City (SSN-723), USS Key West (SSN-722) and USS Asheville (SSN-758).

Other components falling under Naval Base Guam include:

- Naval Base Guam Barrigada
- Ordnance Annex, formerly known as Naval Magazine, in the south central part of Guam
- Defense Fuel Support Point Guam, with fuel facilities at Tenjo Valley and Sasa Valley in Piti

=== Andersen Air Force Base ===
Andersen AFB is one of four bomber forward operating locations in the air force. Andersen is one of two bases in the Asia Pacific region with forward-deployed bomber beddown support, the other being Diego Garcia. Guam has access to almost unrestricted airspace and the close proximity of the Farallon de Medinilla Island, a naval bombing range approximately 150 miles (240 km) north.

=== Marine Corps Base Camp Blaz ===
Other components falling under Marine Corps Base Camp Blaz include:

- Naval Computer and Telecommunications Station Guam (NCTS)
- DoD Andersen AFB Andy South is a military base in Mangilao
- South Finegayan
- Live Fire Training Ranges

==== Units ====
Andersen AFB is hosted by the 36th Wing. It has the following tenant units:

- 497th Combat Training Squadron
- 624th Regional Support Group
- Detachment 1, 69th Reconnaissance Group
- 734th Air Mobility Support Squadron, under Air Mobility Command
- Detachment 5, 22nd Space Operations Squadron
- Detachment 602, United States Air Force Office of Special Investigations
- Helicopter Sea Combat Squadron 25 of the U.S. Navy
- 254th Air Base Group of the Guam Air National Guard
- 337th Air Support Flight, manages USAF Pacific Personnel Exchange Program to Australia
- United States Department of Agriculture facility
- Task Force Talon, 94th Army Air and Missile Defense Command, a Terminal High Altitude Area Defense unit of the U.S. Army

=== Other ===
- United States Naval Hospital Guam in Agana Heights, Guam
- South Finegayan, a housing facility in Dededo
- Andersen South, a large parcel that formerly housed Marine Barracks Guam in Yigo
- Nimitz Hill, a housing facility in Asan
- Northwest Field at the northern tip of Guam in Dededo and Yigo
- North Field on Tinian, CNMI
- Farallon de Medinilla, a CNMI island used as a bombing range
- Pagan (proposed), an island in the CNMI proposed for a training range
