= Marine Corps Base Camp Blaz =

US Marine Corps base in Dededo, Guam, United States

- Dededo in Guam
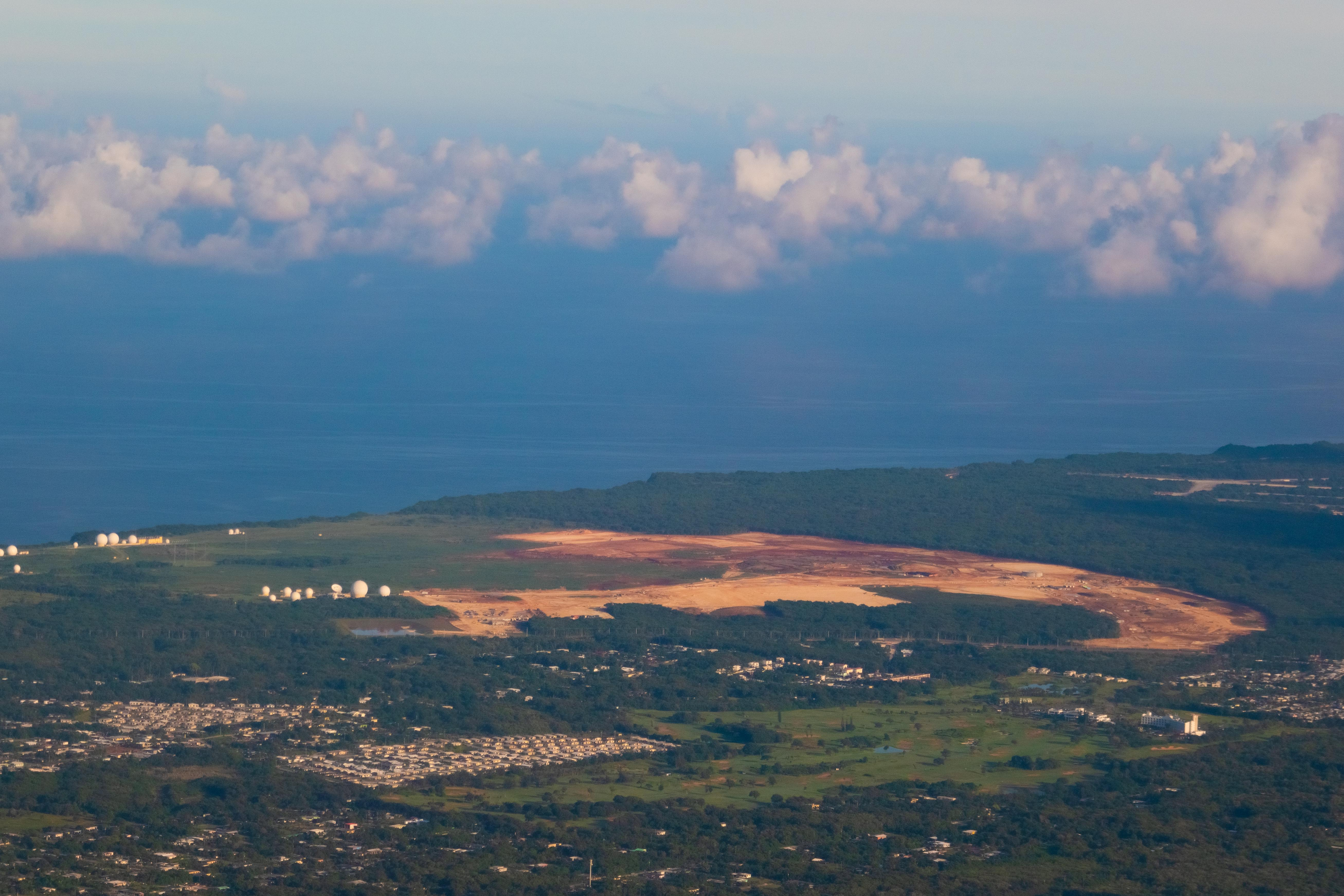
- An aerial view of MCB Camp Blaz

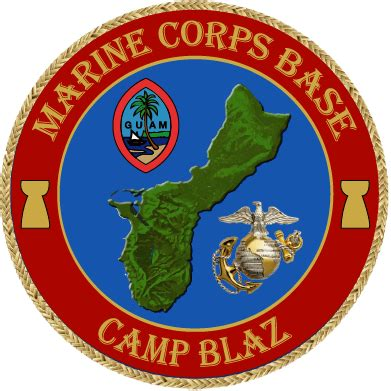

Site information
- Type: Marine Corps base
- Owner: Department of Defense
- Operator: US Marine Corps
- Controlled by: Marine Corps Installations Pacific; Joint Region Marianas
- Condition: Operational
- Website: Official website

Location
- Location in Guam
- Coordinates: 13.5698°N 144.8407°E

Site history
- In use: 2020–present

Garrison information
- Current commander: Colonel Richard D. Marshall Jr.

Marine Corps Base (MCB) Camp Blaz is a U.S. Marine Corps facility located in the village of Dededo in northwest Guam.

== History ==
MCB Camp Blaz was activated on October 1, 2020, becoming the first new Marine Corps facility since the predecessor of Marine Corps Logistics Base Albany was commissioned on March 1, 1952. The base will house Marines relocated from installations in Okinawa Prefecture, Japan, with the final relocation planned for 2025.

MCB Camp Blaz is named after Guam local, Brigadier General Vicente T. "Ben" Blaz. Blaz was the first person of an ethnic minority to reach general rank in the USMC and the highest ranking Chamorro ever, as well as Guam's delegate to Congress from 1985 to 1993.

The base officially opened on January 25, 2023, with a ceremony on January 26. Approximately 5,000 Marines are projected to be stationed there.

== Base ==
Joint Region Marianas is the installation management authority for MCB Camp Blaz, as well as Naval Base Guam and Andersen Air Force Base.

The main dormitories are located next to Naval Computer and Telecommunications Station Guam, with the base to house 1,300 permanently stationed Marines and support 3,700 additional Marines on rotating assignment. Base construction includes multiple new ranges and training facilities, schools, housing, and other support facilities.

The Department of Defense spent $365 million in FY2020 on relocation expenses, with the total cost expected to be $8 billion, of which the Government of Japan will provide $2.8 billion. The governor and Legislature of Guam have been engaged with the Guam Military Buildup.

== See also ==
- US military installations in Guam
- List of United States Marine Corps installations
