= Andersen Air Force Base =

United States Air Force base in Guam

- Yigo in Guam
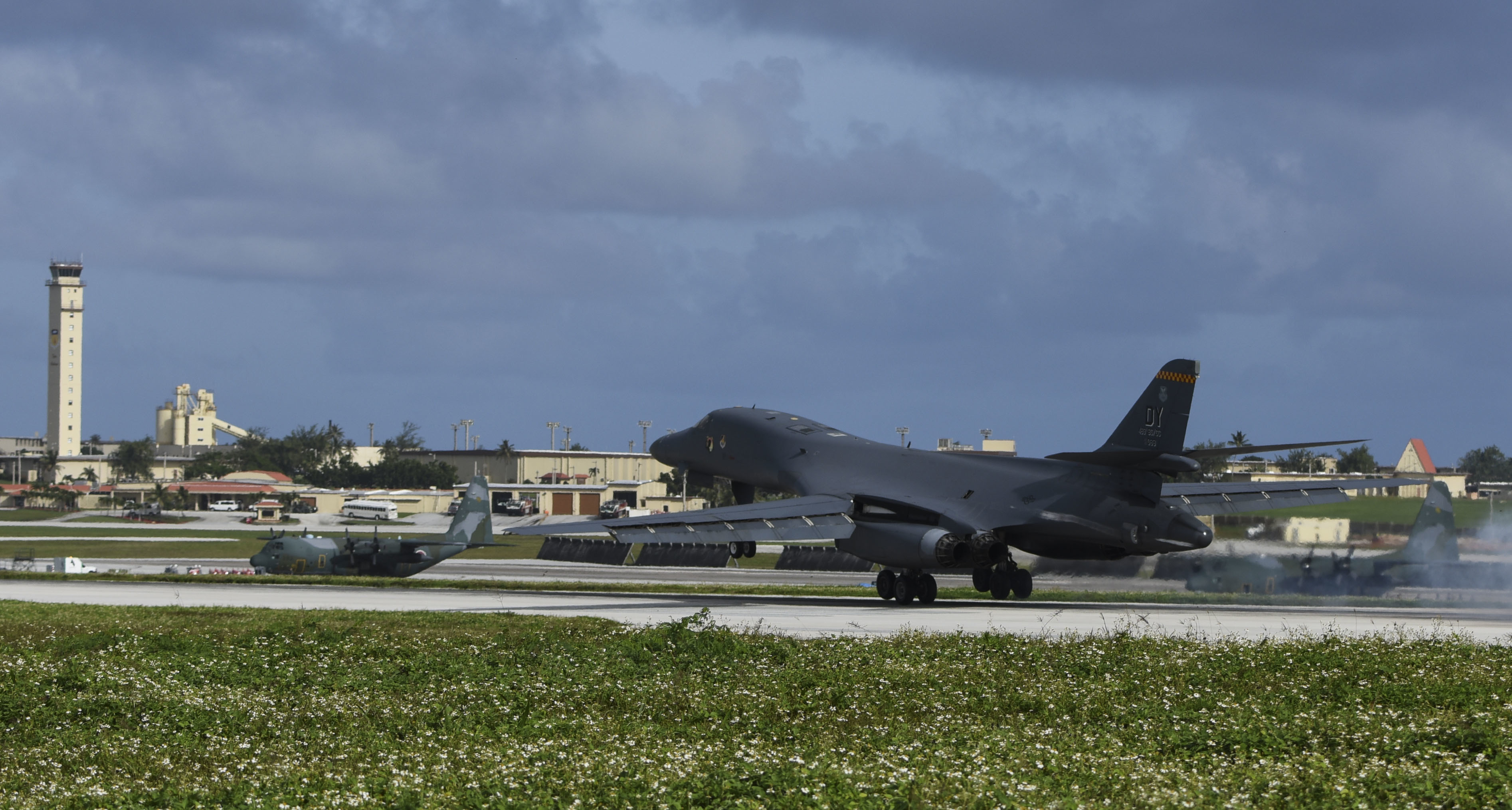
- A B-1B Lancer assigned to the 9th Expeditionary Bomb Squadron lands at Andersen AFB, 2007.

Site information
- Type: US Air Force Base
- Owner: Department of Defense
- Operator: US Air Force
- Controlled by: Pacific Air Forces (PACAF); Joint Region Marianas
- Condition: Operational
- Website: www.andersen.af.mil

Location
- Location in Guam
- Coordinates: 13°34′34″N 144°55′28″E

Site history
- Built: 1944 (as North Field)
- In use: 1944 – present
- Battles/wars: Battle of Guam (1941); Battle of Guam (1944)

Garrison information
- Current commander: Brigadier General Thomas B. Palenske
- Garrison: 36th Wing (Host)

Airfield information
- Identifiers: IATA: UAM, ICAO: PGUA, FAA LID: UAM, WMO: 912180
- Elevation: 188.3 metres (618 ft) AMSL
Runways
Direction	Length and surface
6L/24R	3,208.6 metres (10,527 ft) Asphalt/Concrete
6R/24L	3,413.7 metres (11,200 ft) Asphalt/Concrete
- Source: FAA, official site

Andersen Air Force Base (Andersen AFB, AAFB) (IATA: UAM, ICAO: PGUA, FAA LID: UAM) is a United States Air Force base located primarily within the village of Yigo in the United States territory of Guam. The host unit at Andersen AFB is the 36th Wing (36 WG), assigned to the Pacific Air Forces Eleventh Air Force. As a non-flying wing, the 36 WG's mission is to provide support to deployed air and space forces of USAF, foreign air forces to Andersen, and tenant units assigned to the base.

Andersen AFB was placed under the installation management authority of Joint Region Marianas in October 2009, along with Naval Base Guam. The two bases are about 30 miles (48 km) apart at opposite ends of the island. Established in 1944 after the Liberation of Guam as North Field, it is named for Brigadier General James Roy Andersen (1904–1945).

The most important U.S. air base west of Hawaii, Andersen is one of the four Air Force Bomber Forward Operating Locations and the only base in the Western Pacific that can permanently service U.S. heavy strategic bombers, including B-1B, B-2, and B-52 bombers. Andersen is one of two critical bases in the Asia-Pacific region, the other being Diego Garcia in the Indian Ocean. Due to Guam's almost unrestricted airspace and the close proximity of Farallon de Medinilla Island, a naval bombing range 184 miles (296 km) north, the base is in an ideal training location.

== History ==
Andersen Air Force Base was established on 3 December 1944, and is named for Brigadier General James Roy Andersen (1904–1945). Andersen graduated from the United States Military Academy in 1926, served at various army installations, and obtained his wings at Kelly Field, Texas, in 1936. During 1943–1944 he served on the War Department General Staff. In January 1945, Andersen was assigned to HQ AAF, Pacific Ocean Area. He died on 26 February 1945 in the crash of a B-24 Liberator aircraft between Kwajalein and Johnston Island while en route to Hawaii.

=== World War II ===
Andersen Air Force Base's origin begins on 7 December 1941 when Guam was attacked by the armed forces of Imperial Japan in the Battle of Guam (1941) three hours after the Attack on Pearl Harbor. The United States Navy surrendered Guam to the Japanese on 10 December. At the height of the war, approximately 19,000 Japanese soldiers and sailors were deployed to the island. Guam was liberated by the United States Marine Corps' 3rd Amphibious Corps on 21 July 1944, in the Battle of Guam (1944), after a 13-day pre-invasion bombardment.

The Japanese managed to contain the Marines on two beachheads, but their counter-attack failed. The Marines renewed their assault, and reached the northern tip of the island on 10 August 1944. Japanese guerrilla activities continued until the end of the war. Some were holdouts for many years afterwards.

Guam was considered ideal to establish air bases to launch B-29 Superfortress operations against the Japanese Home Islands. The Marianas Islands are about 1,500 miles (2,400 km) from Tokyo, a range which the B-29s could just about manage. Most important of all, it could be put on a direct supply line from the United States by ship. "North Field," as Andersen AFB was first named, was the first air base built in Guam after its liberation. Its construction began in November 1944 and was supported by the United States Navy Seabees. North Field and its co-located Northwest Field was a massive installation, with four main runways, taxiways, revetments for over 200 B-29s, and a large containment area for base operations and personnel.

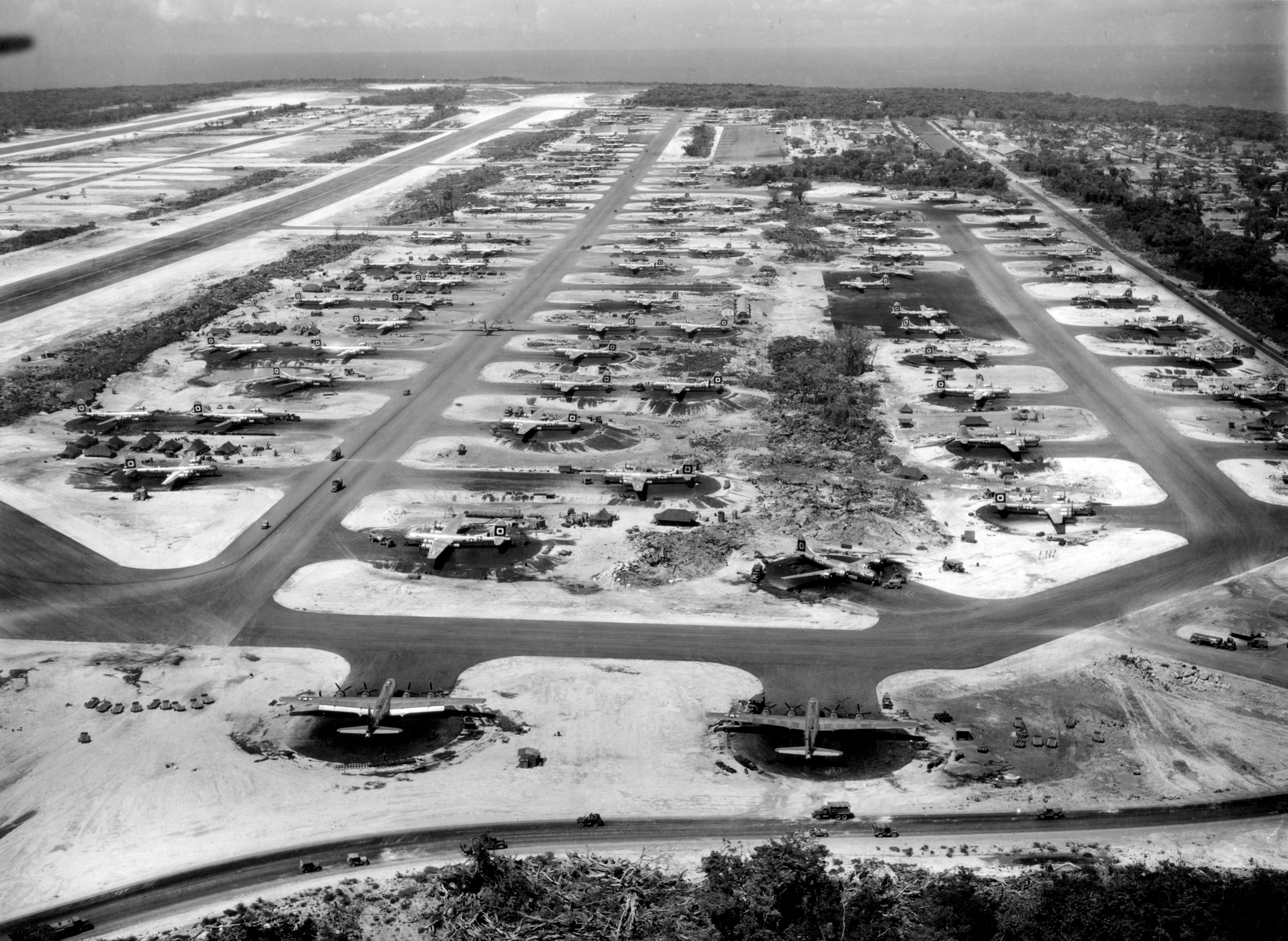
29th Bombardment Group B-29s at North Field, 1 August 1945

The first host unit at North Field was the 314th Bombardment Wing, XXI Bomber Command, Twentieth Air Force. The 314th arrived in Guam on 16 January 1945 from Peterson Field, Colorado. The 314th controlled four operational B-29 bomb groups, the 19th (Square M), 29th (Square O), 39th (Square P), and 330th (Square K).

B-29 Superfortress missions from North Field were attacks against strategic targets in Japan, operating in daylight and at a high altitude to bomb factories, refineries, and other objectives. In March 1945, the XXI Bomber Command changed tactics and started carrying out low-level night incendiary raids on area targets. During the Allied assault on Okinawa, groups of the 314th Bomb Wing attacked airfields from which the Japanese were sending out suicide planes against the invasion force.

Flying out of Guam aboard a B-29, S/Sgt Henry E Erwin of the 29th Bombardment Group was awarded the Medal of Honor for actions during a mission over Koriyama, Japan, on 12 April 1945. When a phosphorus smoke bomb exploded in the launching chute and shot back into the plane, Sgt Erwin picked up the burning bomb, carried it to a window, and threw it out, saving the plane and all aboard her.

After the war, B-29s from North Field dropped food and supplies to Allied prisoners and participated in several show-of-force missions over Japan. The 29th, 39th and 330th Bombardment Groups returned to the United States and inactivated in December 1945. The 19th remained in Guam to become the station's host unit after the 314th Bombardment Wing moved to Johnson Air Base, Japan for occupation duty.

=== Postwar years ===
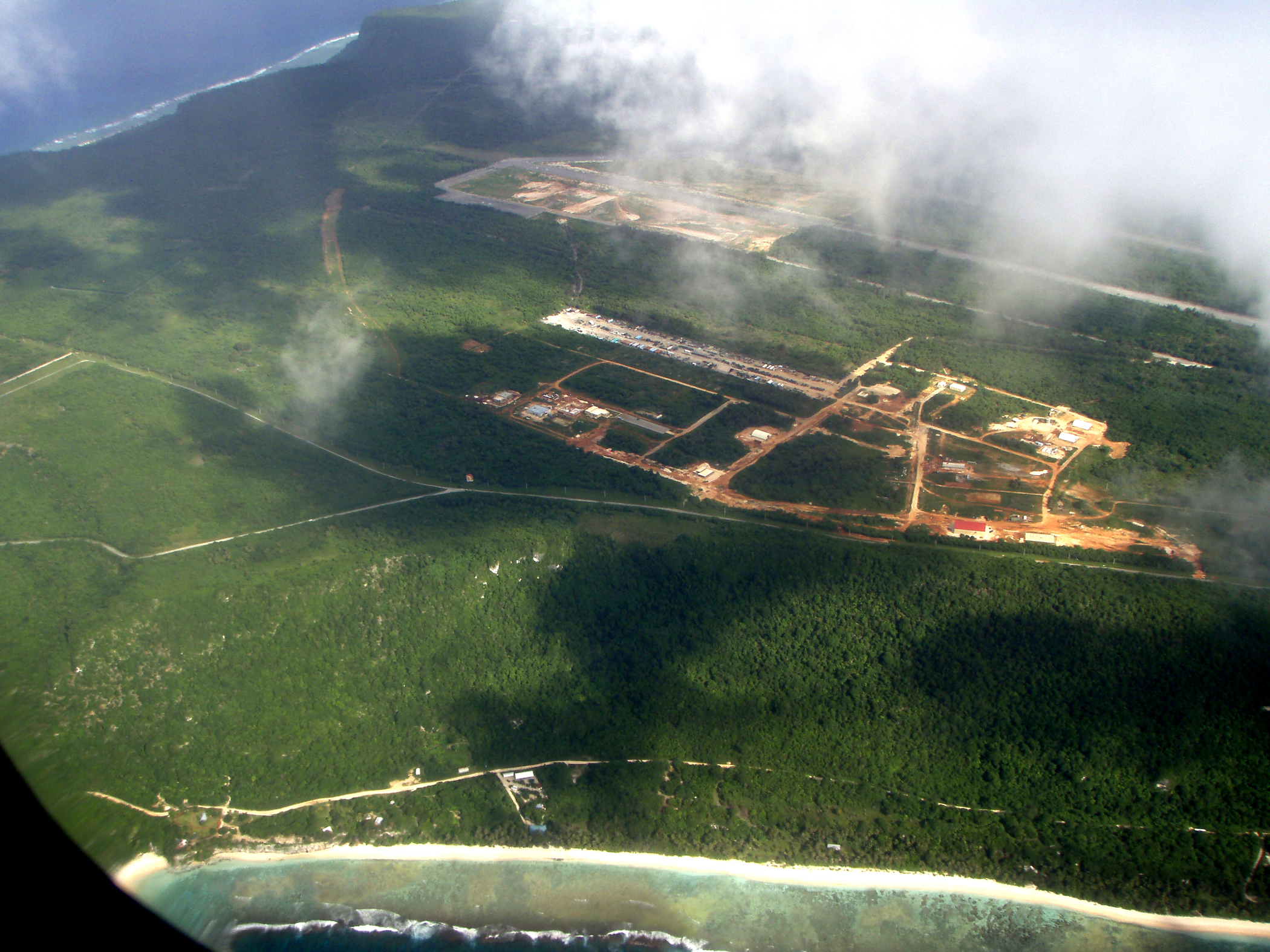
Northwest Field at Andersen Air Force Base

After the end of World War II, Guam served as a collection point for surplus war goods that had accumulated in the Pacific Theater.

The 19th Bombardment Wing (BW) was formed at North AFB in 1948 from the resources of the former North Guam Air Force Base Command (Provisional). The 19th BW operated Andersen AFB and continued utilizing B-29s. In May 1949, the headquarters of the Twentieth Air Force moved from Guam to Kadena Air Base, Okinawa. Its former staff was assigned to the 19th BW.

At Andersen, the wing assumed responsibility for supervising two active bases and one semi-active base, an assortment of communication, weather, radar, rescue and other facilities and units, including the Marianas Air Material Area, a wing size unit. Many of the units and facilities were closed or inactivated within a few months.

In October 1949, the 19th Wing was transferred to the 20th Air Force's command. The remaining units in the Marianas and Bonin Islands were shifted to other organizations. From 17 October 1949 until 28 June 1950, the wing continued B-29 training, operation of Andersen Air Force Base, and rescue and reconnaissance missions.

=== 1950s ===
Three days after North Korea invaded South Korea in 1950, the 19th Bomb Group deployed B-29s to Andersen to begin bombing targets throughout South Korea. A few days later, the group was detached from the 19th BW and deployed to Kadena Air Base, Okinawa. The rest of the wing remained at Andersen, providing maintenance for transient aircraft and operating ammunition dumps until 1953.

In 1951, the Strategic Air Command (SAC) selected several overseas bases to support rotational unit deployments of its bombers from stateside bases, starting with B-29 units and later including B-36 Peacemaker, B-47 Stratojet, B-50 Superfortress bombers and KB-29 refueling tankers.

With decreased hostility in Korea, the 19th BW headquarters was relocated to Kadena Air Base, Okinawa in 1953 and was replaced by the 6319th Air Base Wing of the Far East Air Forces (FEAF). FEAF Bomber Command's 19th Bomb Wing and SAC's 98th and 307th Bomb Wings were inactivated in 1954. Its three B-29 wings returned to the contiguous United States and were replaced with B-47s.

The 3rd Air Division was activated on 18 June in its place. Its objective was to control all SAC units in the Far East. The division operated as a tenant unit from June 1954 until April 1955 and received host-base support services from the 6319th until that unit was inactivated on 1 April 1955. The 6319th was replaced with the SAC-aligned 3960th Air Base Wing.

SAC continued its 90-day unit rotational training program and began to take control of the base from the FEAF. After the 1 April 1955 base transfer and activation of the 3960th Air Base Wing, B-47s replaced the B-36s in the rotations. The 43rd Bomb Wing from Davis-Monthan Air Force Base, Arizona, operated from July to October 1957, which eventually became Andersen's host unit. The 3960th Air Base Wing was redesignated on 1 July 1956 as the 3960th Air Base Group.

The 41st Fighter-Interceptor Squadron of the Pacific Air Forces, along with its F-86s, was stationed at Andersen from August 1956 until it was inactivated in March 1960. After that, the air defense mission was provided by deployments of Fifth and Thirteenth Air Force units flying the F-102 aircraft.

=== Vietnam ===
Andersen's rotational duties concluded when the B-47 was phased out and replaced by the B-52 Stratofortress. The first B-52, the "City of El Paso," arrived from the 95th Bomb Wing at Biggs Air Force Base, Texas in March 1964. It was followed by KC-135 Stratotankers.

With the start of Operation Arc Light in June 1965, B-52Fs and KC-135As began regular bombing missions over Vietnam and continued until 1973, with a break between August 1970 and early 1972.

In support of Operation Arc Light, SAC activated the 4133rd Bombardment Wing (Provisional) on 1 February 1966. The 3960th Strategic Wing, which was originally activated in 1955 as the 3960th Air Base Wing, continued as the base's host wing until it was inactivated and replaced by the 43rd Strategic Wing on 1 April 1970. The 43rd assumed the mission of the 4133rd on 1 July 1970.

It continued in this capacity until the 57th Air Division (Provisional) and 72nd Strategic Wing (Provisional) were activated in June 1972 in support of Operation Bullet Shot (military operation name for temporary duty assignment of US-based technicians — "the herd shot 'round the world."). The 303rd Consolidated Aircraft Maintenance Wing (Provisional) was activated in July 1972. All of the provisional units remained at Andersen until bombing missions ceased on 15 November 1973.

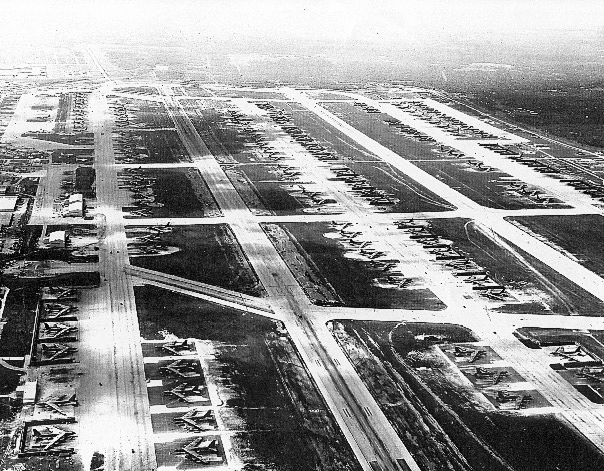
About 150 B-52s at Andersen AFB, fall 1972

Operation Linebacker II continued the mission of Operation Arc Light, and was most notable for its 11-day bombing campaign between 18 and 29 December 1972, in which more than 150 B-52s flew 729 sorties in 11 days. The B-52s at Andersen, combined with other bombers stationed at U-Tapao Field in Thailand, constituted about 50 percent of SAC's total bomber force and 75 percent of all combat crews. Two bases contained the equivalent of 13 stateside bomber wings.

A ceasefire came into effect in Vietnam on 27 January 1973. The B-52s continued to fly missions over Cambodia and Laos until those were halted on 15 August 1973. With the end of these runs, more than 100 B-52s, both D and G Models, were deployed elsewhere in the world by October 1973. The Eighth Air Force moved to Barksdale Air Force Base, Louisiana, and the 3rd Air Division was reactivated on 1 January 1975.

When the North Vietnamese forces overran South Vietnam later in 1975, the base provided emergency relief and shelter for thousands of Vietnamese evacuees as a part of Operation New Life. After the Fall of Saigon, Andersen received almost 40,000 refugees and processed another 109,000 for transportation to the United States.

The base returned to routine operations by the late 1970s, but continued to serve as one of SAC's strategic locations. Crews and aircraft were regularly sent to sites between Australia, Alaska and South Korea and supported sea surveillance operations support for the U.S. Navy.

Andersen was also home to the 54th Weather Reconnaissance Squadron "Typhoon Chasers" during the 1960s through the 1980s. Air crews flying WC-130s tracked and penetrated typhoons, providing advanced warnings to military and civilian populations throughout the western Pacific. During the Vietnam War, the 54th also provided cloud seeding capability along the Ho Chi Minh Trail and synoptic reconnaissance, deploying from Udorn RTAFB when not in Guam. The 54th WRS was inactivated in September 1987.

=== Post-Vietnam ===
In 1983, the 43rd completed its transition from the B-52D to the B-52G and became one of only two SAC bomber wings equipped with the Harpoon anti-ship missile.

The base saw a major change in 1989, when control transferred from SAC to Pacific Air Forces. The 633rd Air Base Wing activated on 1 October 1989, which led to the inactivations of the 43rd Bombardment Wing on 26 March 1990 and the 60th Bombardment Squadron (Heavy) on 30 April 1990.

In August 1990, Andersen personnel began shipping over 37,000 tons of munitions to forces in the Persian Gulf in support of Operations Desert Shield and Desert Storm.

With the eruption of Mount Pinatubo in June 1991, Andersen was instrumental in caring for American evacuees and their pets as a part of Operation Fiery Vigil. In December, Andersen became home to the Thirteenth Air Force, which had evacuated from Clark Air Base in the Philippines after the eruption.

=== Post Cold War ===
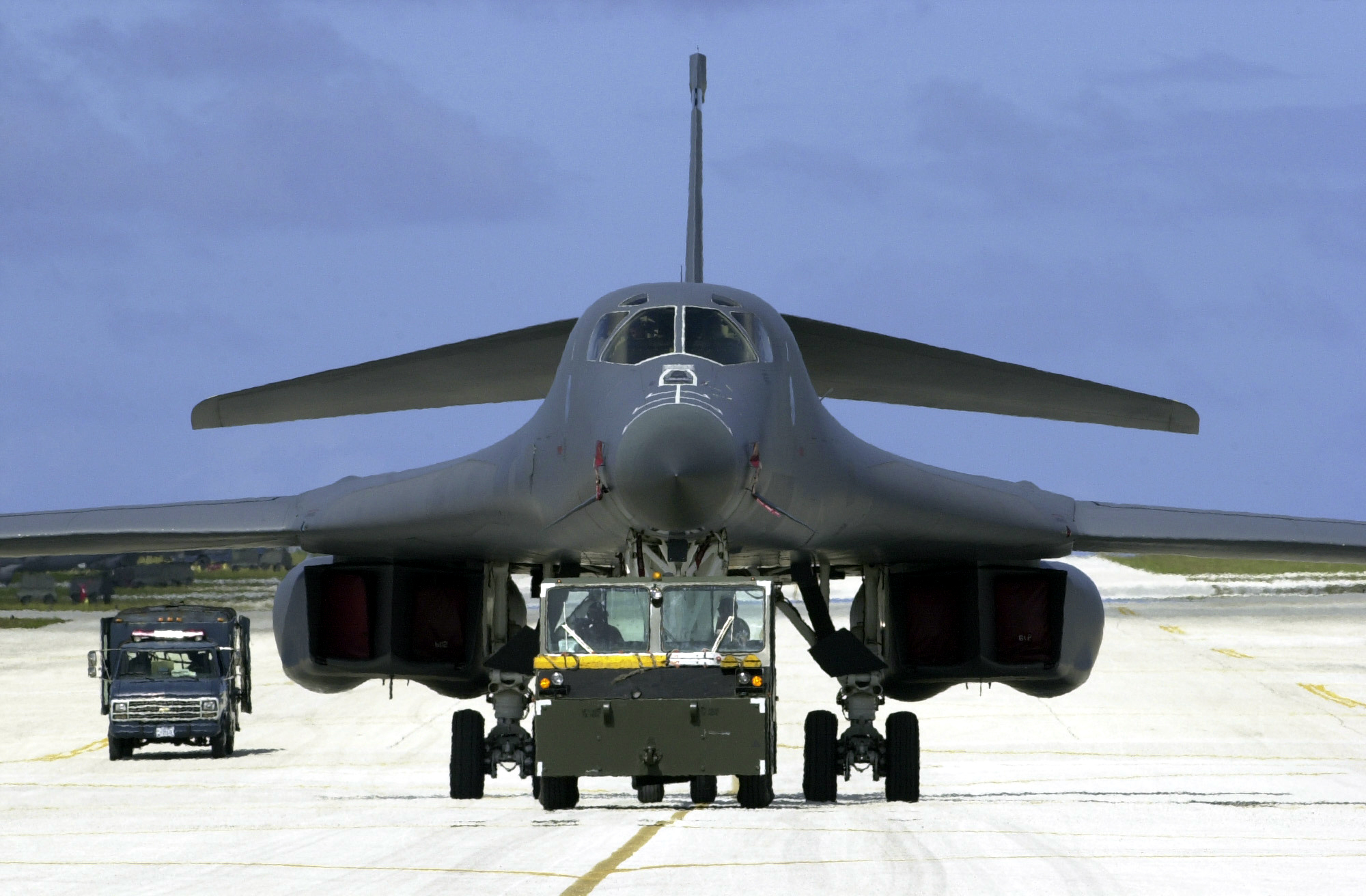
A B-1B bomber at Andersen

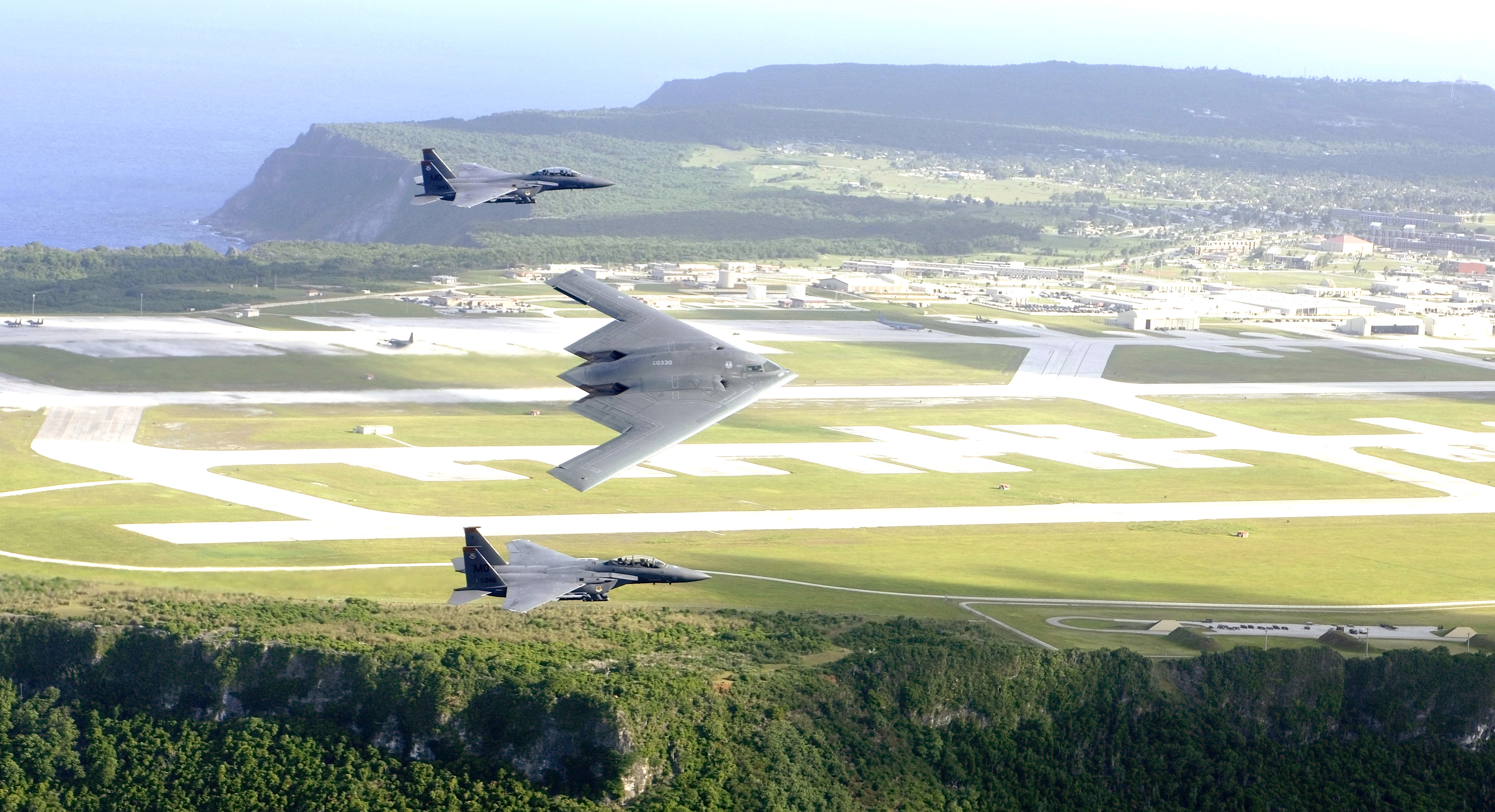
B-2 Spirit and F-15s over Andersen AFB, 2005

The host unit was changed on 1 October 1994, when the 633rd Air Base Wing was inactivated. The 36th Air Base Wing took over host operations and was redesignated as the 36th Wing on 12 April 2006. In October 1994, the U.S. Navy's Helicopter Combat Support Squadron Five (HC-5) relocated to Andersen from the now-closed Naval Air Station Agana, Guam. HC-5 was later redesignated as Helicopter Sea Combat Squadron Twenty-Five (HSC-25) following its transition from the CH-46 to the MH-60S.

The base was one of the few places in the world where the NASA Space Shuttle was permitted to land, serving as an Augmented Emergency Landing Site for the Shuttle orbiter.

In 2007, the condition of the 50-year-old South Runway was found to have deteriorated, and complete removal and replacement of the runway was necessary to maintain safety. It was replaced via a 50 million-dollar Design-Build project from the Air Force Civil Engineer Support Agency to the Tutor-Perini Corporation and its local subsidiary, Black Construction Company. The project's scope included demolition and reconstruction of the existing runway, which was 11,185 feet by 200 feet, as well as repairs and tie-ins to existing taxiway intersections, removal and replacement of degraded airfield lighting, realigning arresting gear and reconstruction.

On 23 February 2008, a USAF B-2 Spirit stealth bomber, one of the most expensive military aircraft in the world (valued at $1.4 billion), crashed on the base moments after takeoff, due to a mechanical failure. Both pilots ejected safely. This was the first time a B-2 had crashed.

On 21 July 2008, a B-52 crashed into the sea while on a training mission that was to fly over a parade in Guam commemorating the U.S. liberation of the island from Japanese occupation in 1944.

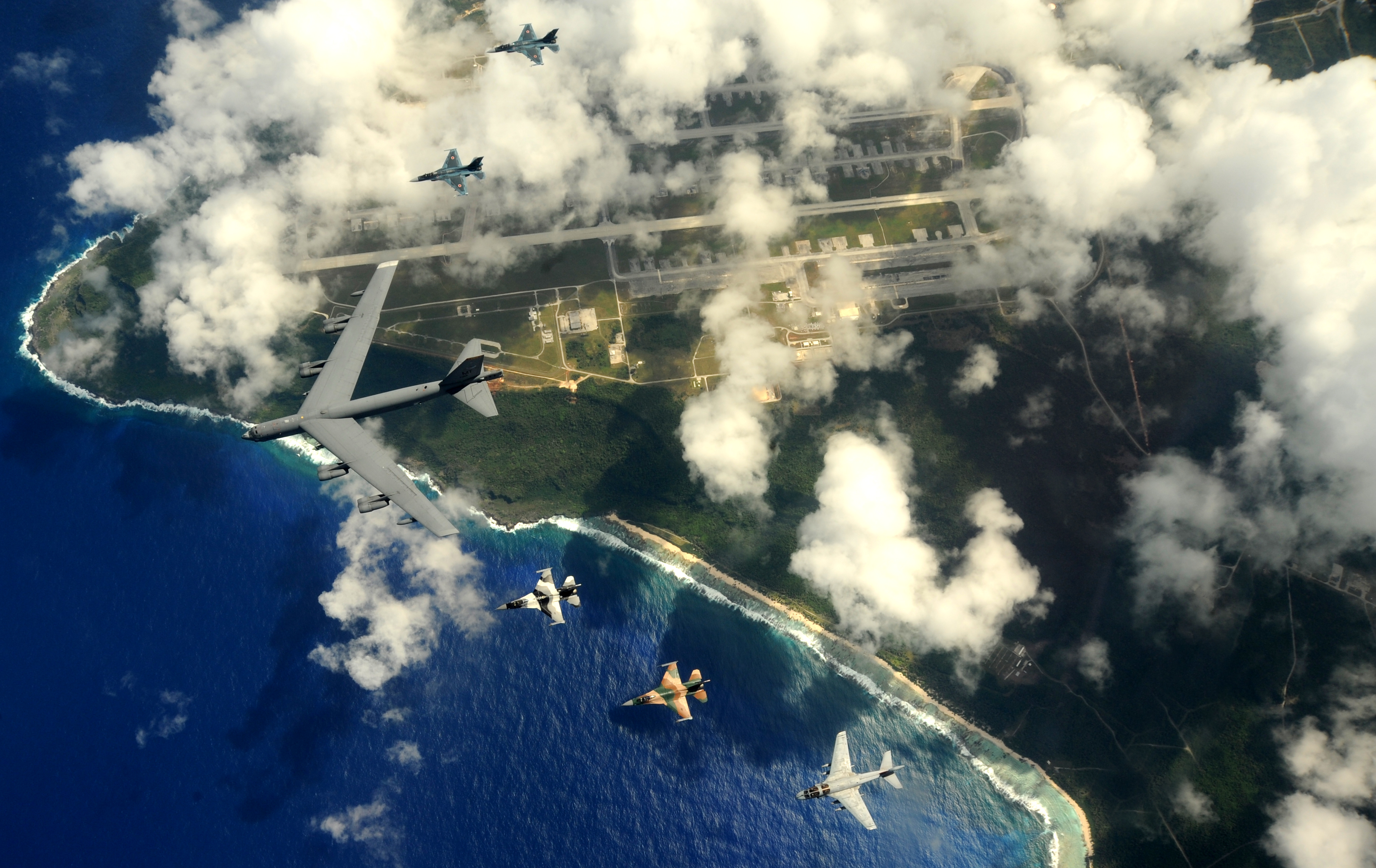
A B-52 Stratofortress and other planes flying over Guam, 2009

B-2s and B-52 aircraft from the 13th Bomb Squadron and 393d Bomb Squadron have taken turns in order to provide a continuous bomber presence at the base. One four-month deployment involving four B-2s began in March 2009.

In March 2009, the base announced that it would investigate allegations made by a whistleblower of environmental violations within the protected area of the base. The allegations included poaching, illegal trapping of coconut crabs and resale of trophy deer, paving beaches, and stripping vegetation used for nesting by endangered hawksbill turtles and green sea turtles. Public Employees for Environmental Responsibility (PEER) said, "The Air Force program for protecting Guam's natural resources has utterly broken down." The Department of Defense Inspector General (DOD IG) determined that the Air Force responses to the PEER allegations adequately addressed the issues raised. Consequently, DoD IG determined further investigation was not warranted.

The strategic importance of Andersen AFB was brought to the forefront on 12 February 2013 when the base was circled by two Russian Tupolev Tu-95 Bear-H bombers hours prior to President Barack Obama's State of the Union Address. Their flight was monitored by US F-15 fighter jets. The Russian bombers later left the area in a northbound direction.

As tensions escalated between the U.S. and the North Korean regime, the latter threatened to strike the island. A total of 816,393 munitions assets valued at over $95 million were delivered to Andersen Air Force Base between 21 August and 30 September 2017.

In early 2019, the main operational and flying units on the base included the 36th Wing (PACAF), elements of the 624th Regional Support Group, the 734th Air Mobility Support Squadron (Air Mobility Command), Detachment 1, 69th Reconnaissance Group, flying the Northrop Grumman RQ-4 Global Hawk, and the Helicopter Sea Combat Squadron Two-Five (HSC-25), U.S. Navy, flying the Sikorsky MH-60S.

In April 2020, 16 years of continuous bomber presence (CBP) at Andersen ended when the USAF announced it was no longer permanently basing strategic bombers outside the continental United States. Since 2004, B-1B Lancer, B-2A Spirit and B-52G Stratofortress aircraft deployed to Guam on a rotational basis. Despite the move, bombers are expected to continue to deploy on an ad hoc basis.

As part of the establishment of Marine Corps Base Camp Blaz, additional facilities are being constructed on Andersen to house Marines to be stationed there. In addition, the North Ramp on Andersen is being converted for Marine Corps air operations and the abandoned housing facility Andersen South (south of the base proper) is being converted to an urban training compound.

In July 2023, Andersen Air Force Base served as the destination for a record-breaking flight by a Royal Air Force (RAF) Airbus A400M Atlas. Departing from RAF Brize Norton on July 3, the aircraft completed a nonstop, 20-hour and 36-minute flight covering over 7,000 miles to reach Guam.

== Previous names, commands, and assignments ==
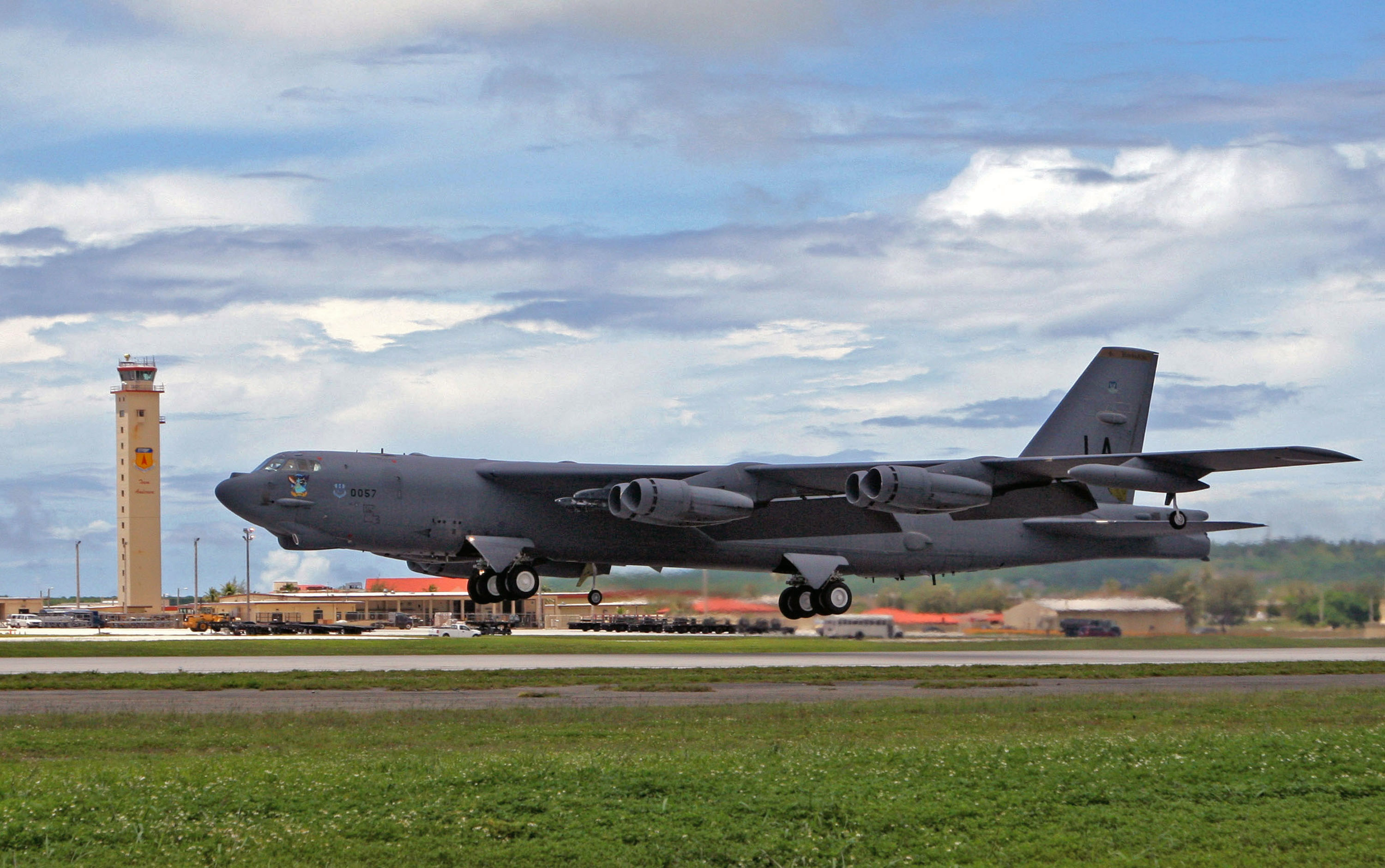
A B-52 from Barksdale AFB takes off from Andersen, 2007

- Established as North Field, December 1944 (station became operational on 3 February 1945)
- North Field AB Command, 9 May 1946
- North Army Air Base, 20 December 1947
- North Air Force Base, 1 March 1948
- North Guam Air Force Base, 22 April 1948
- North Field Air Force Base, 1 February 1949
- North Guam Air Force Base, 1 March 1949
- Andersen Air Force Base, 7 October 1949–present
- Became part of Joint Region Marianas, 1 October 2010–present

=== Major commands assigned ===
- Twentieth Air Force, 3 February 1945
- Far East Air Force, 15 May 1949
- Strategic Air Command, 1 April 1955
- Pacific Air Forces, 1 October 1989

=== Major units assigned ===
- 314th Bombardment Wing, 16 January 1945 – 15 May 1946

19th Bombardment Group, 16 January 1945 – 1 June 1953
29th Bombardment Group, 17 January 1945 – 20 May 1946
39th Bombardment Group, 18 February – 17 November 1945
330th Bombardment Group, 18 February – 17 November 1945

- 19th Air Refueling Group, North Army Air Base Command (Provisional), 20 December 1947 – 17 August 1948
- North Guam Air Force Base Command (Provisional), 15 May 1946 – 24 August 1948
- 19th Bombardment Wing, 10 August 1948 – 1 June 1953
- 54th Strategic Reconnaissance Squadron, 21 February 1951 – 18 March 1960
- 6319th Air Base Wing, 1 June 1953 – 1 April 1955
- 3d Air Division, 18 June 1954 – 1 April 1970
- 92d Bombardment Wing, 16 October 1954 – 12 January 1955
- 509th Bombardment Wing, 10 July – 8 October 1954
- 6th Bombardment Wing, 14 January – 12 April 1955
- 3960th Air Base Wing, 1 April 1955 – 1 April 1970
- 5th Bombardment Wing, 14 January – 12 April 1955
- 99th Bombardment Wing, 29 January – 25 April 1956
- 303d Bombardment Wing, 12 July – 4 October 1956
- 41st Fighter-Interceptor Squadron, 5 August 1956 – 8 March 1960
- 320th Bombardment Wing, 5 October 1956 – 11 January 1957
- 327th Air Division, 1 July 1957 – 8 March 1960
- 605th Military Airlift Support Squadron, 27 December 1965

Redesignated: 605th Airlift Support Squadron, 8 January 1966
Redesignated: 734th Air Mobility Squadron, 1 June 1992 – present

- 4133d Bombardment Wing (Provisional), 1 February 1966 – 1 July 1970
- 43d Strategic (later Bombardment) Wing, 1 April 1970 – 30 September 1990
- 633d Air Base Wing, 1 October 1989 – 1 October 1994
- 36th Air Base Wing, 1 October 1994

Redesignated: 36th Wing, 12 April 2006 – present

- Helicopter Sea Combat Squadron Two-Five, 3 February 1984 – present
- Task Force Talon - US Army, E Battery, 3rd Air Defense Artillery Regiment THAAD and support elements.

== Location ==
The U.S. Census Bureau puts it into its own census-designated place in Guam.

== Based units ==
Flying and notable non-flying units based at Andersen Air Force Base.

Units marked GSU are Geographically Separate Units, which although based at Andersen, are subordinate to a parent unit based at another location.

=== United States Air Force ===
Pacific Air Forces (PACAF)

- Eleventh Air Force
  - 36th Wing
    - Headquarters 36th Wing
    - 36th Operations Group
      - 36th Operations Support Squadron
    - 36th Contingency Response Group
      - 36th Contingency Response Squadron
      - 36th Contingency Response Support Squadron
      - 554th RED HORSE Squadron
      - 644th Combat Communications Squadron
      - 736th Security Forces Squadron
    - 36th Maintenance Group
      - 36th Expeditionary Aircraft Maintenance Squadron
      - 36th Maintenance Squadron
      - 36th Munitions Squadron
    - 36th Medical Group
      - 36th Medical Operations Squadron
      - 36th Medical Support Squadron
    - 36th Mission Support Group
      - 36th Civil Engineering Squadron
      - 36th Communications Squadron
      - 36th Contracting Squadron
      - 36th Force Support Squadron
      - 36th Logistics Readiness Squadron
      - 36th Security Forces Squadron

Air Combat Command (ACC)

- Sixteenth Air Force
  - 319th Reconnaissance Wing
    - 319th Operations Group
      - 4th Reconnaissance Squadron – RQ-4B Global Hawk (seasonal)

Air Mobility Command (AMC)

- United States Air Force Expeditionary Center
  - 515th Air Mobility Operations Wing
    - 715th Air Mobility Operations Group
      - 734th Air Mobility Squadron (GSU)

Air Force Reserve Command (AFRC)

- Fourth Air Force
  - 624th Regional Support Group
    - 44th Aerial Port Squadron (GSU)
    - 624th Aerospace Medicine Flight
    - 624th Regional Support Group Operating Location-Alpha
    - 724th Aeromedical Staging Flight

Air National Guard (ANG)

- Guam Air National Guard
  - 254th Air Base Group
    - 254th RED HORSE Squadron
    - 254th Security Forces Squadron

=== United States Navy ===
Commander, Naval Air Forces (COMNAVAIRFOR)

- Commander, Helicopter Sea Combat Wing Pacific
  - Helicopter Sea Combat Squadron 25 (HSC-25) – MH-60S Seahawk

=== United States Space Force ===
Space Operations Command (SpOC)

- Space Delta 6
  - 21st Space Operations Squadron
    - Detachment 2 (GSU)

== Education ==
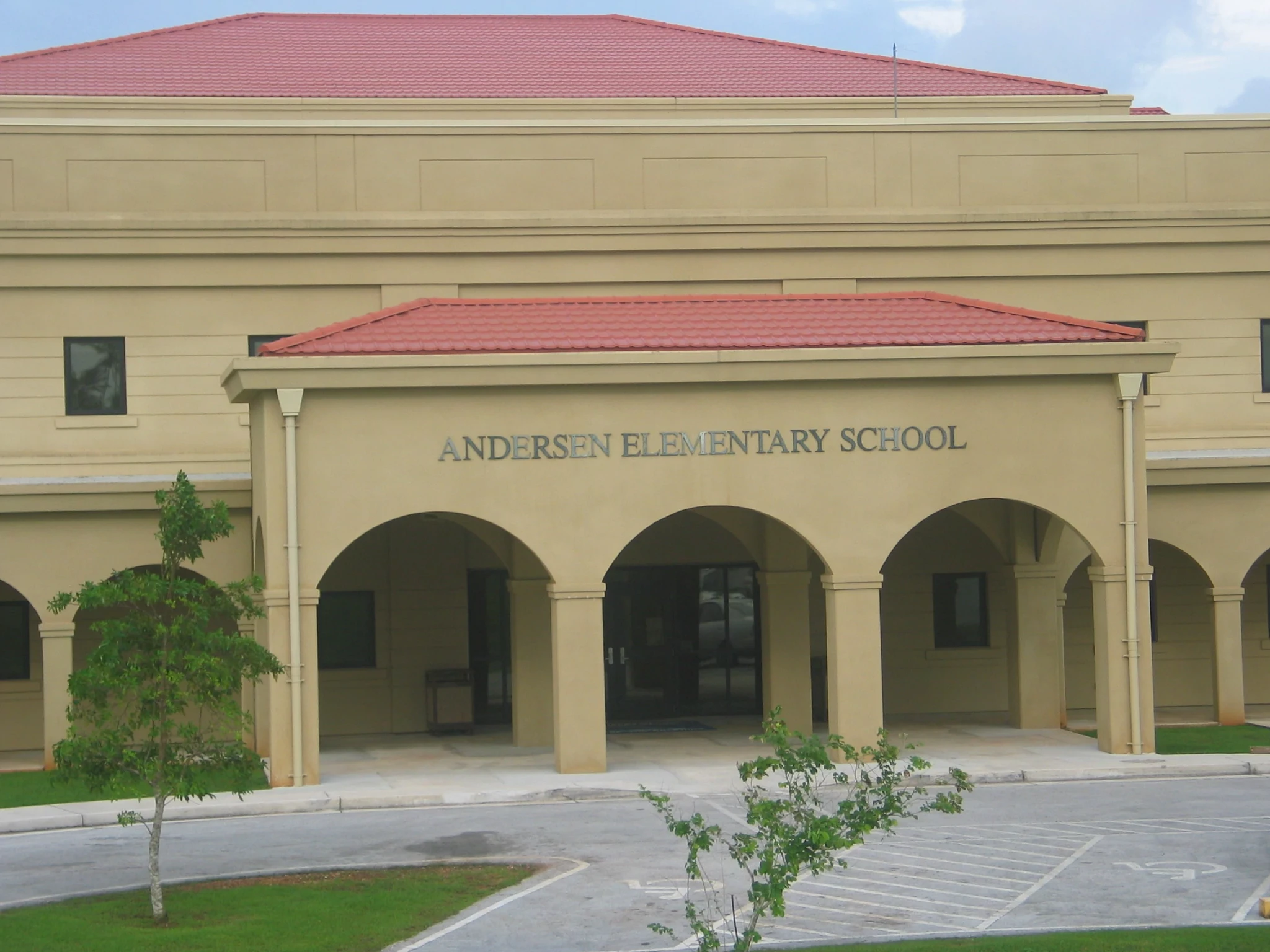
Andersen Elementary School

Andersen Air Force Base is home to Andersen Elementary School and Andersen Middle School, both operated by the Department of Defense Education Activity (DoDEA). High school students in the DoDEA system attend Guam High School in Agana Heights, Guam. From the base, there is only school bus service to the high school.

Higher educational opportunities are available for those in the military, Department of Defense employees, and family members at Andersen through contracted academic institutions such as The Asian Division of University of Maryland University College (UMUC) and The Pacific Far East Division of Central Texas College.

=== Andersen Middle School ===
Andersen Middle School caters to a population of 6th to 8th graders from American military families. The school is within the Department of Defense Education Activity school system and the subsystem DDESS Guam. It has a 5-year accreditation obtained from the North Central Association of Colleges and Schools. In September 1997, DoDEA opened its own schools for children of military personnel.

Andersen Middle School's sports include volleyball, cross country, softball, soccer, and basketball.

Andersen Middle School was founded in 1997 and was scattered across Andersen Air Force Base. Classes for the original school were held in former Air Force dormitories. Many rooms had walls knocked out in order to accommodate class sizes. The original library for the elementary school was shared with the base library for its first year. As of 2012, it is now permanently located in an air conditioned building.

Andersen Middle School adopted the block scheduling system. The required core classes are physical education, mathematics, science, social studies, ELA, Spanish, and language arts. The elective classes include band, study skills, video production, culture, various art classes and drama. The school offers both a special education program and opportunities to take high school courses, such as algebra and geometry.

== Accidents and incidents ==
- On 23 February 2008, 'Spirit of Kansas', a U.S. Air Force B-2 Spirit stealth bomber, crashed on one of Andersen's runways moments after takeoff.
- On 21 July 2023, a Royal Canadian Air Force Airbus CC-150 Polaris collided with a French Air and Space Force Airbus A400M Atlas on a ramp at the airfield. No injuries were reported. Both aircraft were at Andersen for an exercise. The cause for the collision is under investigation.

== See also ==
- US military installations in Guam
- United States Army Air Forces in the Central Pacific Area, historical
