= Haputo Beach Site =

Archaeological site in Guam

- U.S. National Register of Historic Places
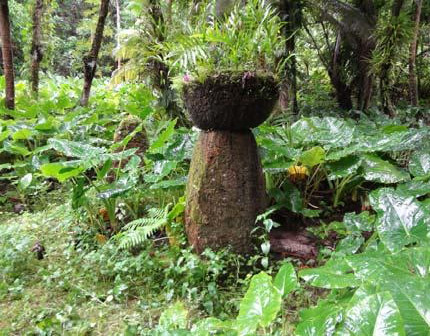
- Undated US Navy photograph
- Location: Address restricted
- Nearest city: Finegayan, Guam
- Area: 7.4 acres (3.0 ha)
- NRHP reference No.: 74002308
- Added to NRHP: November 20, 1974

The Haputo Beach Site is a prehistoric village site in northwestern Guam.

The site, located on Naval Computer and Telecommunications Station Guam land near a sheltered cove, includes standing latte stones, as well as rock shelters and caves with evidence of human occupation. In addition to needing military permission for access to the site, the main trail leads through the Navy's Haputo Ecological Preserve.

The site was listed on the National Register of Historic Places in 1974.

== See also ==
- National Register of Historic Places listings in Guam
