= Naval Computer and Telecommunications Station Guam =

Coordinates: 13.573°N 144.844°E

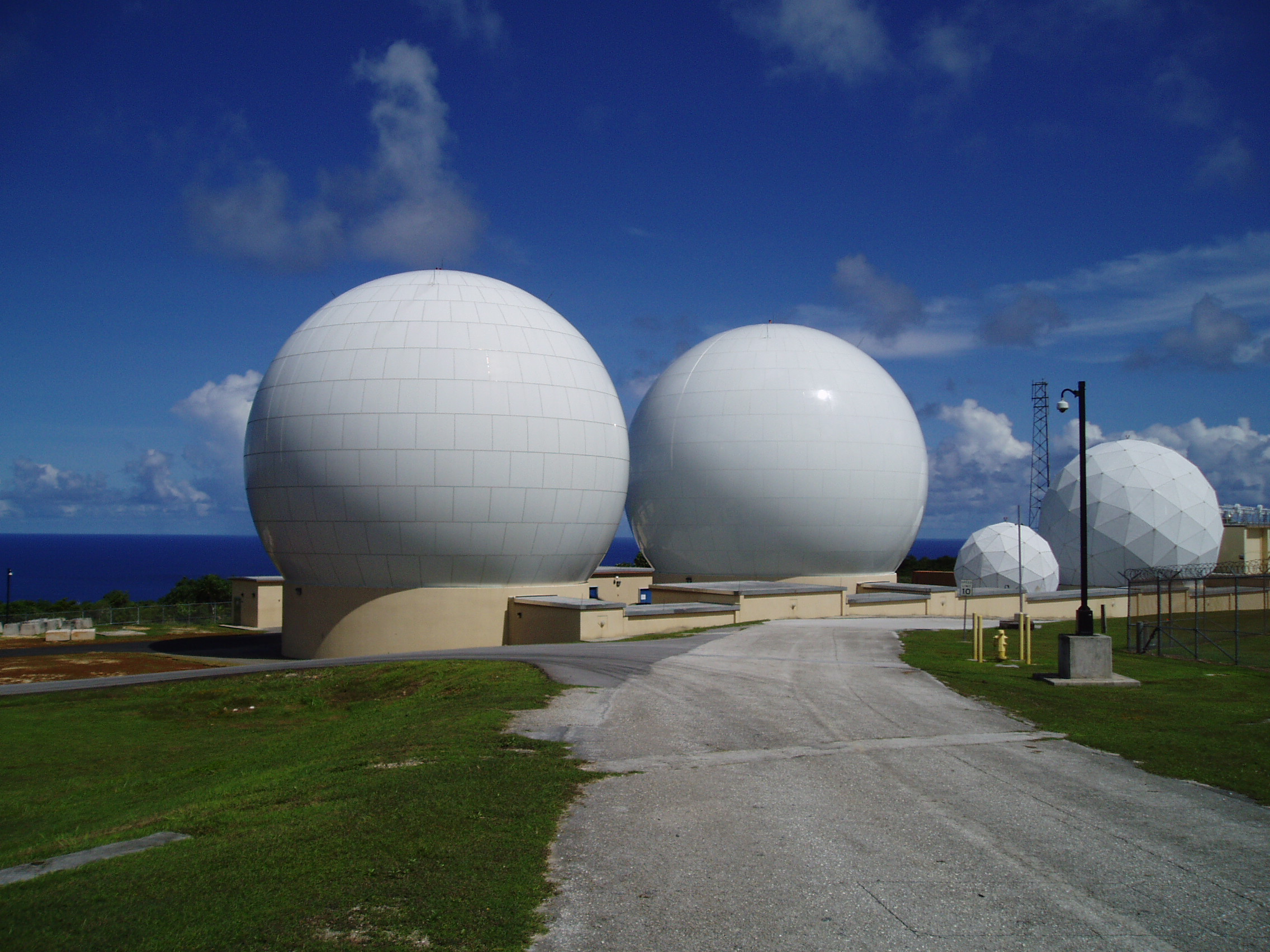
- The Guam Remote Ground Terminal of the Tracking and Data Relay Satellite System at NCTS Guam
- Active: 1944-
- Allegiance: United States
- Branch: United States Navy
- Type: Shore
- Role: Communications support
- Part of: NCTAMS PAC; Naval Base Guam; Joint Region Marianas

Commanders
- Current commander: Commander Anthony A. Bumatay

Naval Computer and Telecommunications Station Guam (NCTS Guam) is a United States Navy communications facility on the U.S. territory of Guam. It is located on the Naval Base Guam North Finegayan Telecommunications Site along Guam Highway 3 in Dededo, on the northwest coast of the island.

NCTS Guam is under the United States Tenth Fleet's Naval Computer and Telecommunications Area Master Station Pacific (NCTAMS PAC) and under the installation management authority of Joint Region Marianas. It has been variously referred to as Naval Communications Station Guam (NCS Guam), NCS or NCTS Finegayan, and North Finegayan.

NCTS Guam provides communications support in the areas of responsibility for the U.S. Third, Fifth, and Seventh Fleets.

== History ==
The facility dates back to 1944, immediately after the 1944 Battle of Guam. It was previously designated Naval Computer and Telecommunications Area Master Station Western Pacific (NCTAMS WESTPAC), before those responsibilities were merged with NCTAMS EASTPAC to form NCTAMS PAC in Honolulu in 2000, and the Guam facility was redesignated a NCTS.

NCTS Guam previously managed the Navy housing located at the separated but nearby South Finegayan military property. In 2020, Marine Corps Base Camp Blaz, located adjacent to NCTS Guam, was activated amid its construction.

== Base ==
Assets at NCTS Guam include or included:

- The Guam Remote Ground Terminal, one of three ground terminals of the Tracking and Data Relay Satellite System, though controlled remotely by the White Sands Ground Terminal at White Sands Missile Range in New Mexico.
- A contingency site for the Common User Digital Information Exchange System in case of congestion with the NCTAMS PAC or NCTAMS EURCENT, or a failure of the Naval Communications Processing and Routing System.
- One of the 14 Cold War-era Navy AN/FRD-10 circular "Wullenweber" antenna arrays, shut down in 1999.

The coastline of NCTS Guam includes the NRHP-listed Haputo Beach Site, which lies within the Navy's Haputo Ecological Reserve.

== See also ==
- US military installations in Guam
