= HSC-25 =

Helicopter Sea Combat Squadron 25
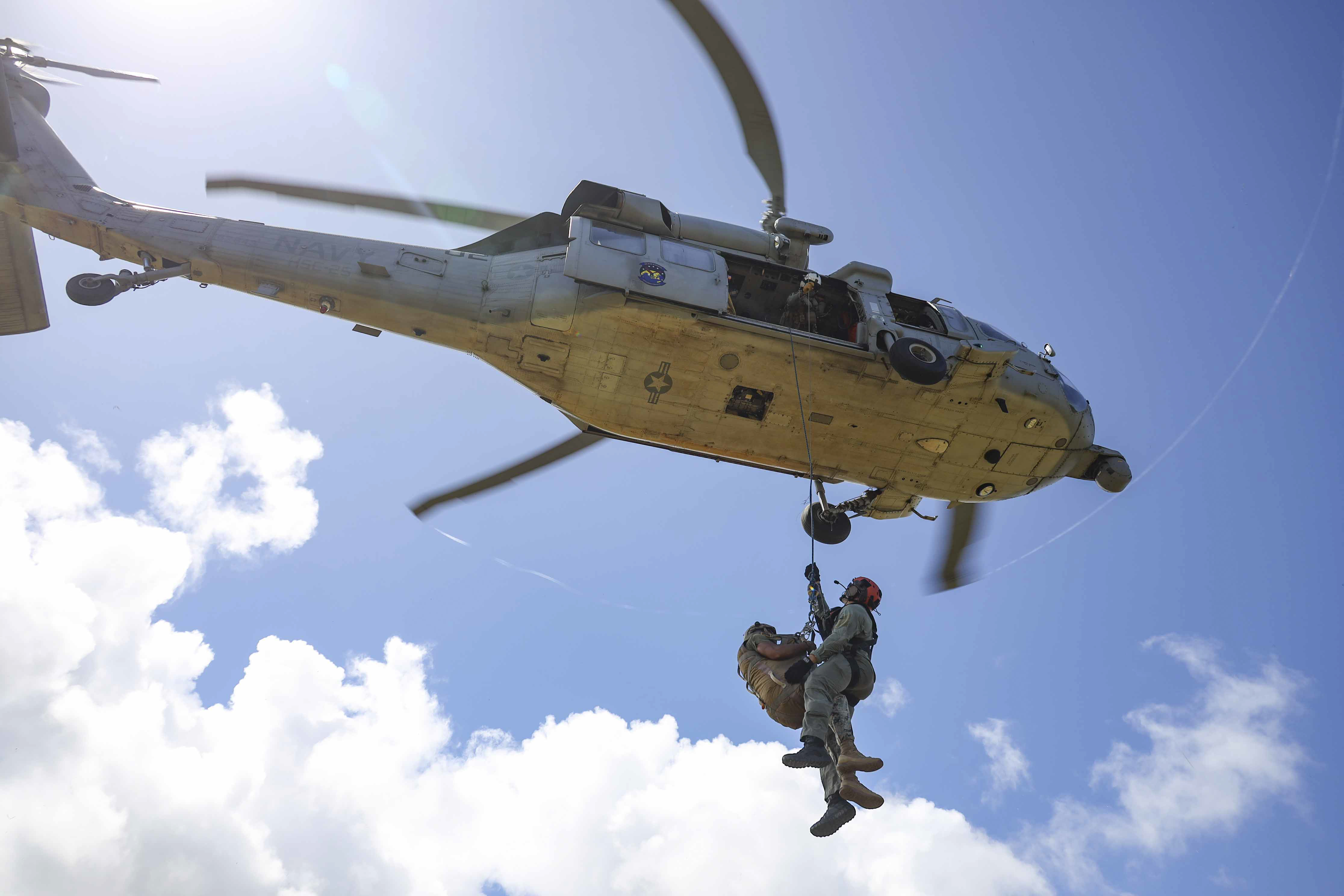
- A corpsman is hoisted into a MH-60S Seahawk during a 2022 exercise in Guam
- Active: 3 February 1984 – present (42 years, 2 months)
- Country: United States
- Branch: United States Navy
- Type: Helicopter Squadron
- Role: Anti-Surface Warfare; Combat search and rescue Search and rescue Special Operations; Vertical replenishment
- Part of: Naval Air Force, U.S. Pacific Fleet: Helicopter Sea Combat Wing Pacific
- Garrison/HQ: Andersen Air Force Base, Guam
- Nickname: Island Knights
- Colors: Blue and Gold
- Engagements: Operation Southern Watch; Operation United Shield; Operation Vigilant Sentinel; Operation Unified Assistance; Operation Enduring Freedom; Operation Iraqi Freedom; Iran War
- Decorations: HSC Battle "E" (2018; 2024)

Commanders
- Current commander: Commander Mark S. Klein

Insignia
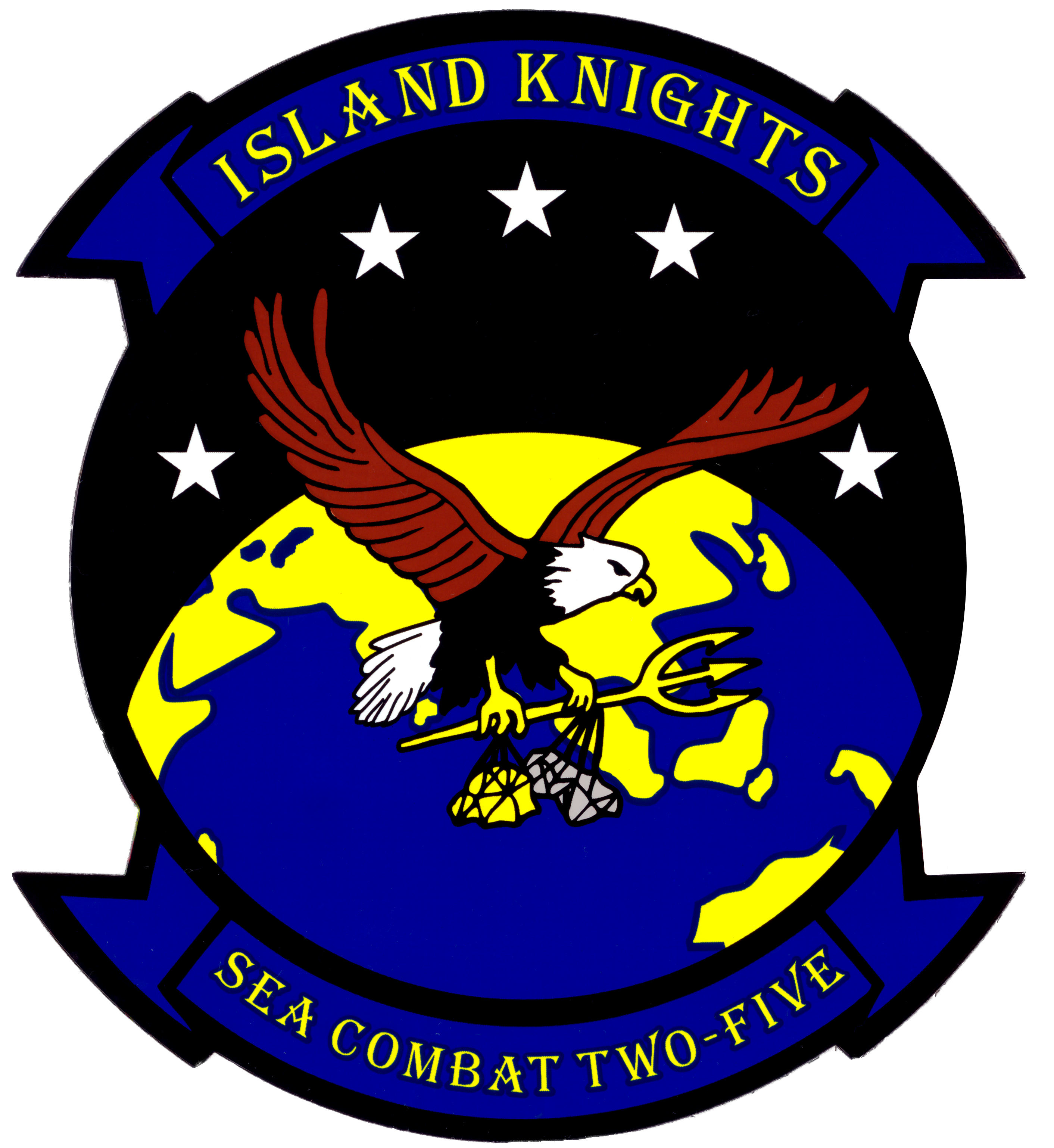
- HSC-25 emblem

Helicopter Sea Combat Squadron 25 (HSC-25) "Island Knights" is a United States Navy helicopter squadron based at Andersen Air Force Base, Guam. The "Island Knights" of HSC-25 fly the MH-60S "Knighthawk" helicopter, manufactured by Sikorsky Aircraft Corporation in Stratford, Connecticut.

== Search and Rescue, MEDEVAC, Aerial Firefighting ==
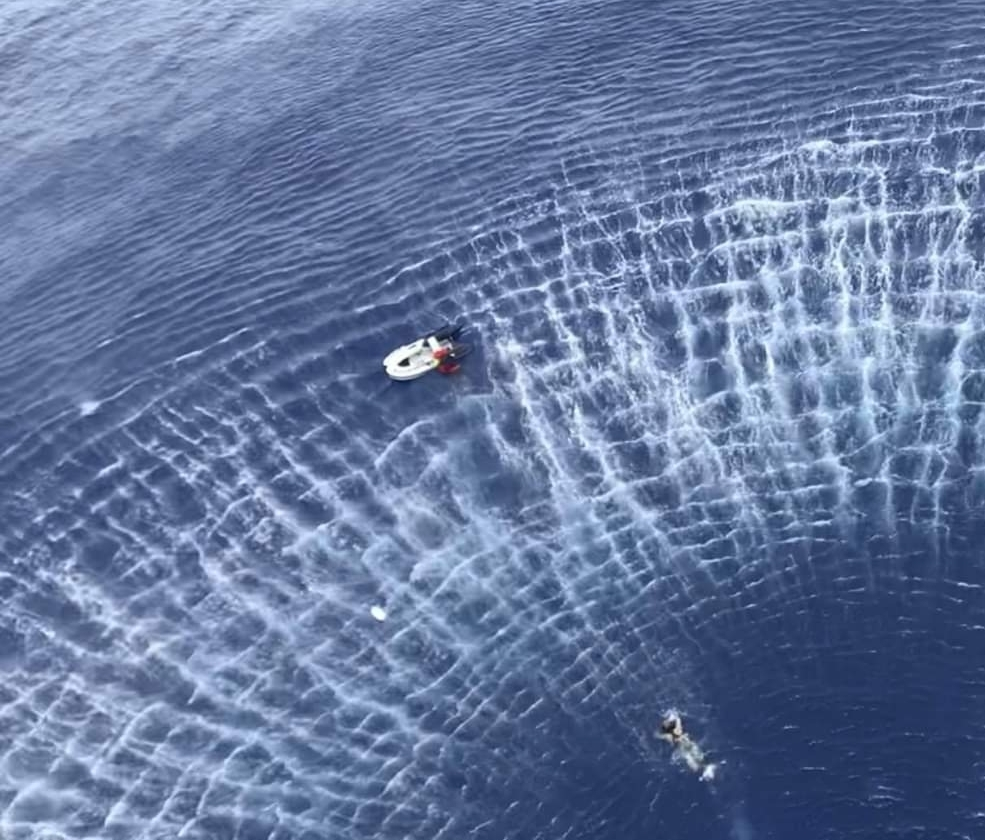
An HSC-25 rescue swimmer swims toward a stranded civilian sailboat in a search and rescue mission near Guam in 2019

HSC-25 is the only Search and Rescue Helicopter platform in Guam. As a result, HSC-25 provides the highest number of Search and Rescue missions of all Navy Helicopter Squadrons. HSC-25 (previously HC-5) has saved a total of 4,207 lives. The Island Knights supported the Naval Air Ambulance Detachment from Camp Buering, Kuwait & Basra, Iraq from Fall 2005 to May 2012, saving a total of 2,923 lives. HSC-25 currently provides the Commonwealth of the Northern Mariana Islands with 24/7 support of Search and Rescue, Medevac, and Aerial Firefighting missions. As of August 2019, HSC-25's homeguard unit (stationed at Andersen AFB, GU), has a total of 617 lives saved during Search and Rescue missions, the first being June 27, 1984 with HC-5. In addition, 667 successful MEDEVAC missions have been completed since the first one on May 26, 1984. Lastly, since March 18, 1996 HSC-25 has performed 49 successful Aerial Firefighting missions, 4 of which were completed at night on Night Vision Devices.

== Primary Missions ==
As part of Helicopter Sea Combat Wing, Pacific, HSC-25 is the Navy's only forward deployed Expeditionary Sea Combat squadron, providing Anti-Surface Warfare, Personnel Recovery, Special Operations support, Vertical Replenishment, Search and Rescue, and Medical Evacuation capabilities to ships and units in the Seventh Fleet Area of Responsibility. HSC-25, known as the “Island Knights”, is based at Andersen Air Force Base, Guam. At homeguard, HSC-25 maintains an aggressive tactics program in support of both deployed and local special warfare units, Expeditionary and Carrier Strike Groups, as well as providing 24-hour SAR and MEDEVAC services for Guam and the Northern Mariana Islands. The squadron provides launch and recovery capabilities for target drones and exercise torpedoes to support readiness and certification requirements of Submarine Force Pacific Fleet submarines. HSC-25 also supports heliborne firefighting for the local area and Vertical Onboard Delivery and Fleet logistics support for deployed units in the Guam area. 2018 was a particularly active period for Search and Rescue with 54 sorties, a total of 104 flight hours, 27 individuals rescued, and 16 MEDEVAC missions.

== History ==
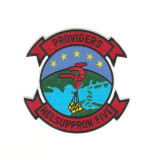
HC-5 squadron insignia.

Helicopter Sea Combat Squadron Two Five (HSC-25) was initially established as Helicopter Combat Support Squadron Five (HC-5) at Naval Air Station Agana, Guam on 3 February 1984. As the "Providers", HC-5 flew the CH-46D Sea Knight, moving to Andersen AFB in 1995 following the BRAC-directed closure of NAS Agana. Redesignated as the "Island Knights" on 21 April 2005, HSC-25 provides logistic support for the U.S. Pacific Fleet in the Navy's newest helicopter, the MH-60S Knighthawk. The squadron employs approximately eighty officers and three hundred enlisted personnel to fly and maintain the fleet of 12 MH-60Ss.

HSC-25 is the first and only forward-deployed vertical replenishment (VERTREP) squadron in the Navy and is tasked with supporting Seventh Fleet units in the Western Pacific, Indian Ocean, North Arabian Sea, and Persian Gulf. To provide this support, HSC-25 embarks two-aircraft detachments aboard Military Sealift Command vessels which provide transportation of equipment, fuel, supplies and ammunition to sustain U.S. forces worldwide. In addition, the squadron was tasked in 1992 to provide a permanent Search and Rescue (SAR) detachment aboard USS Belleau Wood. In the spring of 1996, HSC-25 deployed their first night vision device capable amphibious SAR detachment to USS Belleau Wood. In the fall 2000, the SAR detachment was permanently moved from USS Belleau Wood to USS Essex. In the winter 2011, the SAR detachment was again permanently moved from USS Essex to USS Bonhomme Richard whose homeport is Sasebo, Japan.

In the Fall 2005, HSC-25 was again the first HSC Squadron to assume a new mission, providing essential Air Ambulance services for Coalition Forces, and Compotent Command (CFLCC) in Camp Buering, Kuwait.

The only Navy squadron on board Andersen Air Force Base, Guam, HSC-25 rapidly incorporated itself into "Team Andersen". In addition to VERTREP, HSC-25 provides 24-hour (overland/over-water) SAR/Medical Evacuation (MEDEVAC) services for Guam and the Northern Mariana Islands. HSC-25 also conducts airborne firefighting utilizing externally carried buckets, Vertical Onboard Delivery (VOD), drone and torpedo recovery, special operations airborne support, and fleet logistics support for all military activities in the Guam area, including the Maritime Prepositioned Ships (MPS) operating in the local area.

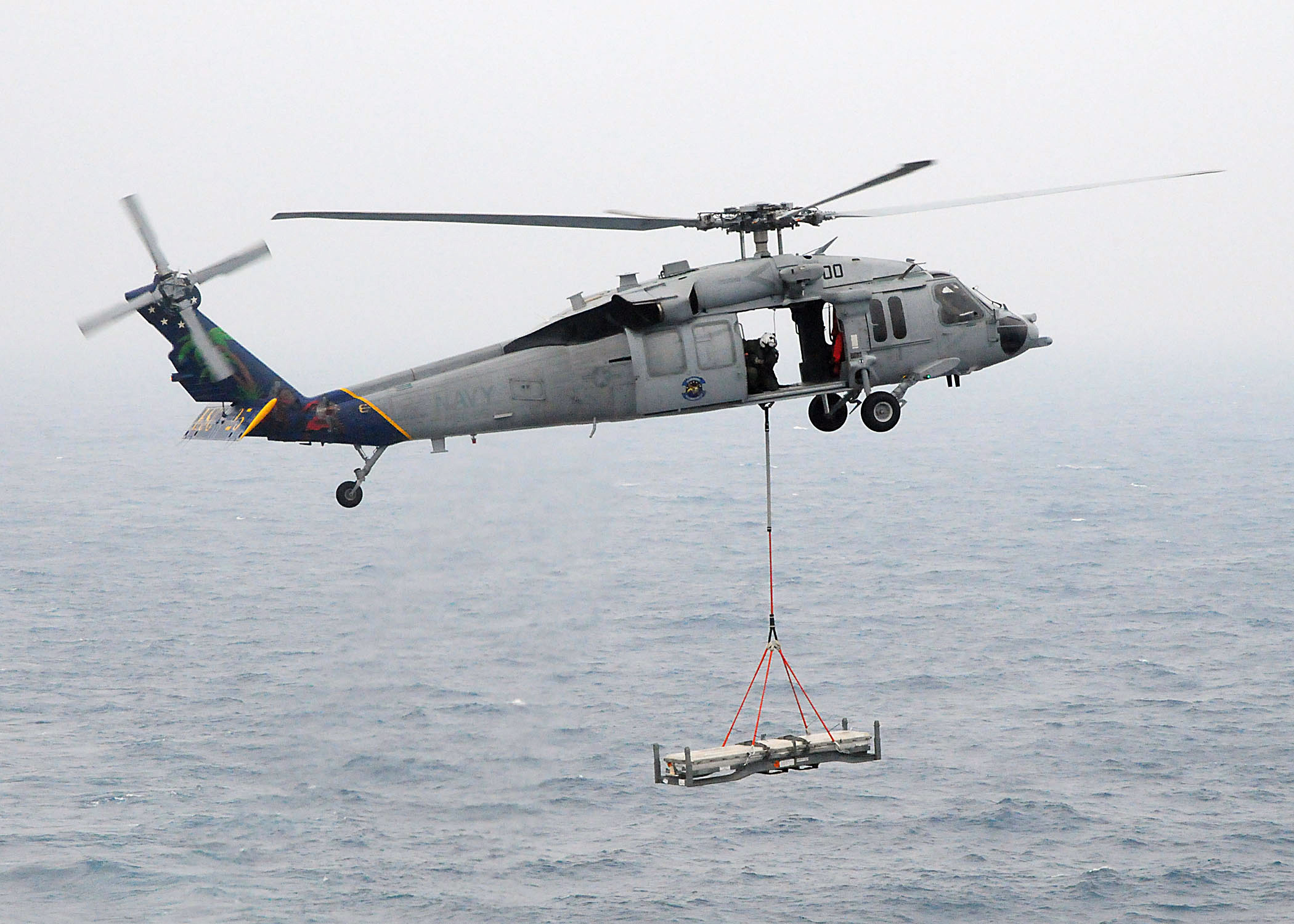
An MH-60S of HSC-25 transfers munitions in 2009.

Since February 1984, HSC-25 has moved millions of tons of supplies and ammunition, as well as thousands of personnel, providing much of the logistic power to the 7th and 5th Fleets. The aircraft of HSC-25 have operated in emergency MEDEVAC and rescue missions and participating in Operations TRI-CRAB, Southern Watch, United Shield, Cobra Gold, Vigilant Sentinel, Tandem Thrust and most recently Unified Assistance, Enduring Freedom, and Iraqi Freedom.

HSC-25 is reported one of the embarked squadron onboard USS Tripoli on its deployment to Middle East during the 2026 Iran war.

== Insignia ==
HSC-25 was established as Helicopter Combat Support Squadron Five (HC-5) on 3 February 1984 and was re-designated Helicopter Sea Combat Squadron Twenty Five on 21 April 2005. As HC-5 the squadron earned a reputation for exceptional service and support to the Fifth and Seventh Fleets and to the Commonwealth of the Northern Marianas Islands. The HSC-25 insignia was developed to acknowledge the legacy of the squadron when it was known as HC-5 and attempt to embrace the future of the squadron as it became HSC-25.

The trident held by the eagle symbolizes the emphasis being placed on the combat capabilities of the helicopter in the maritime environment as well as pays homage to the squadrons naval heritage. The loads hanging from the trident represent the past, present, and future missions of VERTREP. The five stars remain as a legacy to HC-5, and the globe is arranged to represent the squadron's Area of Operation and its service to the Pacific Fleet. The black background represents the expanding night capabilities of the squadrons pilots and aircraft.

== Aircraft ==
The "Island Knights" fly the MH-60S helicopter, manufactured by Sikorsky Aircraft Corporation in Stratford, Connecticut.

== See also ==
- History of the United States Navy
- List of United States Navy aircraft squadrons
