= 624th Regional Support Group =

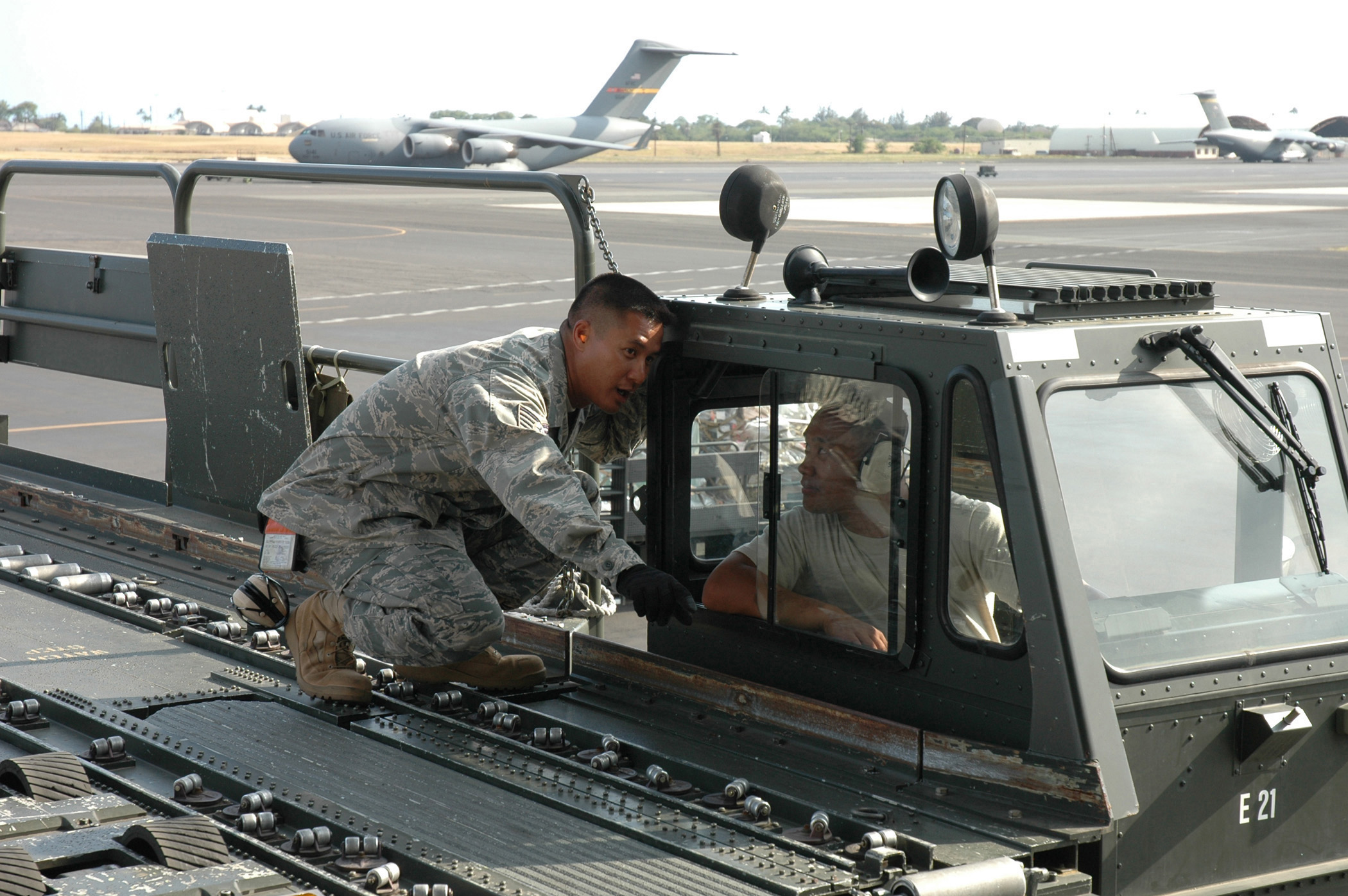
- Members of the group's 28th Aerial Port Squadron loading cargo
- Active: 2002 – present
- Country: United States
- Branch: United States Air Force
- Role: Support of regional reserve forces
- Part of: Air Force Reserve Command
- Garrison/HQ: Hickam Air Force Base
- Decorations: Air Force Outstanding Unit Award

Commanders
- Current commander: Col. Athanasia Shinas

Insignia
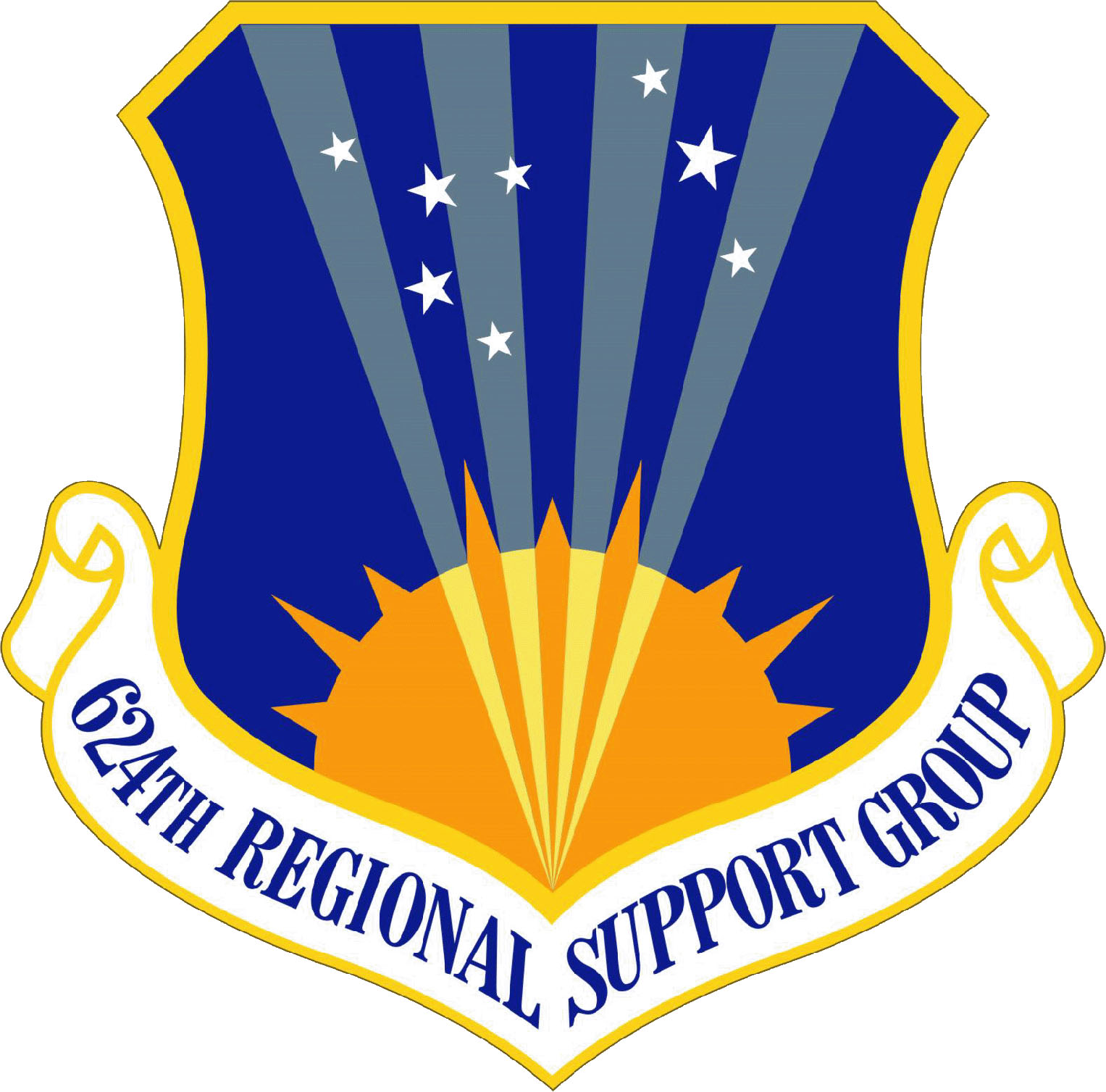
- 624th Regional support Group emblem (Note: Approved 23 August 2004.)

The 624th Regional Support Group, headquartered at Hickam Air Force Base, Hawaii, is one of two Air Force Reserve groups stationed in the Pacific Area of Responsibility and reports directly to the headquarters of the Fourth Air Force at March Air Reserve Base, California.

== Units ==
The group is composed of a headquarters, four squadrons, and one flight at Hickam Air Force Base, Hawaii, and Andersen Air Force Base, Guam.

- The group Directorate of Personnel Management provides military personnel flight services, to both reserve members and the retired military community.
- The 44th Aerial Port Squadron at Andersen Air Force Base, Guam, processes and loads personnel and cargo on any aircraft in the U.S. Air Force or Civil Air Reserve Fleet.
- The 48th Aerial Port Squadron deploys personnel to augment fixed port facilities and provide stand-alone air terminal operations worldwide in support of the long war, exercises or contingency operations, unit moves, foreign humanitarian relief or disaster response operations. The unit works in port operations including aircraft loading, cargo processing and inspection, passenger services, aircraft fleet servicing and aerial port command and control.
- The 624th Aeromedical Staging Squadron provides medical support and oversight for the entire 624th RSG. Peacetime missions include training to maintain competency and preparedness for both war and peacetime activities. It deploys qualified medical personnel to augment air staging facilities. The function of an aeromedical staging facility is to provide personnel and equipment necessary for the patient movement required worldwide. Squadron personnel support operations worldwide, including the long war, exercises, humanitarian relief and disaster response operations.
- The 624th Civil Engineer Squadron is composed of three Prime Base Engineer Emergency Force teams, seven Firefighting teams and one Readiness team capable of rapid deployment worldwide to construct and maintain airfield facilities, provide firefighting support, and coordinate planning for any disasters.
- The 624th Aeromedical Staging Flight at Andersen Air Force Base, Guam serves as the medical arm of the 624th Regional Support Group with a primary peacetime mission to provide medical support to Reserve organizations to ensure wartime readiness. Its wartime mission is to deploy qualified medical professionals in support of Aerospace Expeditionary Force rotations.

== History ==
The 624th Regional Support Group was established on 1 January 2002, resulting from the reorganization of resources from various entities. The group emerged from the transformation of the 604th Regional Support Group, with personnel and components from several sources. The formation involved changes to existing units and designations. For instance, the 604th Aeromedical Staging Squadron, the 604th Logistics Support Flight, and the 704th Civil Engineer Squadron at Hickam, were respectively replaced by the 624th Aeromedical Staging Squadron, 624th Logistics Support Flight (subsequently inactivated), and 624th Civil Engineer Squadron. Moreover, the 604th Aeromedical Staging Squadron operating location at Andersen was replaced by the 724th Aeromedical Staging Flight and 724th Logistics Support Flight (which is no longer active). The 48th Aerial Port Squadron at Hickam and the 44th Aerial Port Squadron at Andersen were transferred to the 624th Group.

== Lineage ==
- Established as the 624th Regional Support Group on 15 Oct 2001
- Activated on 1 January 2002

=== Assignments ===
- Fourth Air Force, 1 January 2002 – present

=== Stations ===
- Hickam Air Force Base (later Joint Base Hickam Pearl Harbor, 1 January 2002 – present

=== Components ===
- 44th Aerial Port Squadron, 1 January 2002 – present
- 48th Aerial Port Squadron, 1 January 2002 – present
- 624th Aeromedical Staging Squadron, 1 January 2002 – present
- 624th Logistics Support Flight, 1 January 2002 – unknown
- 624th Civil Engineer Squadron, 1 January 2002 – present
- 624th Aeromedical Staging Flight, 1 January 2002 – unbknown
- 624th Logistics Support Flight, 1 January 2002 – unknown
