= 2018 Guamanian legislative election =

- November 6, 2018

All 15 seats of the Legislature of Guam
- Turnout: ≈66% (▼)

	Majority party	Minority party
Leader	Benjamin Cruz (retired)	James Espaldon (retired)
Party	Democratic	Republican
Leader's seat	At-large district	At-large district
Seats before	9	6
Seats won	10	5
Seat change	▲1	▼1
Speaker before election
Benjamin J.F. Cruz
Democratic
Elected Speaker
Tina Muña Barnes
Democratic

Legislative elections were held in Guam on Tuesday, November 6, 2018, along with the election for the Guam delegate to the U.S. House of Representatives. Before the election, the Democratic Party held nine of the fifteen seats in the Legislature while the Republican Party held six seats. The election resulted in a gain of one seat for the Democrats and a loss of one seat for Republicans. Democrats also won the race for Guam's US House Delegate.

== Candidates ==
=== Democratic ===
==== Declared ====
- Jose "Pedo" T. Terlaje
- Ned Richard Pablo
- Amando S. Dominguez
- Tina Muna Barnes
- Franklin Joseph Meno
- Joe S. San Agustin (I)
- Jack Eugene Hattig III
- Amanda L. Shelton
- William Parkinson
- Therese M. Terlaje (I)
- Jermaine Alerta
- Lasia A. Casil
- Telena Nelson (I)
- Regine Biscoe Lee (I)
- Celestin C. Babauta
- Kelly G. Marsh (Taitano)
- Clynton "Clynt" E. Ridgell
- Adolpho B. Palacios Sr.
- Sabina Eileen Perez
- Maria Lourdes Milligan

==== Declined ====
- Thomas "Tom" C. Ada
- Frank Aguon Jr. (running for Governor of Guam)
- Benjamin Cruz (running for Public Auditor)
- Dennis G. Rodriguez Jr. (running for Governor of Guam)
- Michael San Nicolas (running for Guam Delegate)

=== Republican ===
- Benito Santos Servino
- Jeffrey Wheaton
- Telo Teresa Taitague
- James Camacho Moylan
- Ryan Joseph Calvo
- Javier Atalig Jr.
- Mary Camacho Torres (I)
- Louisa "Louise" Borja Muna (I)
- Alfredo Antolin Jr.
- Amanda Francel Blas
- William "Wil" M. Castro (I)
- Jenei Adame Aguon
- Julius Caeser Santos
- Roland Ray Blas
- Jose Acfalle San Agustin
- Stephen Joseph Guerrero
- Michelle Hope Taitano
- Harold J. Cruz

==== Declined ====
- Fernando Esteves Jr.
- James Espaldon
- Thomas "Tommy" Morrison

== Primary election ==
Primary elections in Guam were held on August 25, 2018. The first 15 candidates who win the highest votes for each party will move on to the general election.

=== Results ===
==== Democratic primary results ====
Democratic primary results
Party	Candidate	Votes	%
Democratic	Therese M. Terlaje (incumbent)	17,226	
Democratic	Telena M.C. Nelson (incumbent)	15,982	
Democratic	Joe S. San Agustin (incumbent)	14,919	
Democratic	Regine Biscoe Lee (incumbent)	13,542	
Democratic	Tina Muña Barnes	13,499	
Democratic	Amanda L. Shelton	13,890	
Democratic	Sabina E.F. Perez	10,648	
Democratic	Clynton E. Ridgell	10,354	
Democratic	Celestin C. Babauta	9,953	
Democratic	Kelly Marsh Taitano	9,873	
Democratic	Jose "Pedo" T. Terlaje	9,834	
Democratic	Jermaine Alerta	9,614	
Democratic	Adolpho B. Palacios Sr.	8,937	
Democratic	Jack Eugene Hattig III	8,853	
Democratic	Lasia A. Casil	7,563	
Democratic	William D. Parkinson	7,274	
Democratic	Franklin James Meno	7,182	
Democratic	Maria Lourdes Milligan	7,179	
Democratic	Armando S. Dominguez	5,985	
Democratic	Ned Richard Pablo	5,724	
Democratic	Write-in candidates	120	.15
Turnout		49,249	

==== Eliminated candidates ====
Five Democrats hopefuls were eliminated in the 2018 primaries:

- Armando S. Dominguez
- Maria Lourdes Milligan
- Franklin James Meno
- Ned Richard Pablo
- William M. Parkinson

==== Republican Party Primary ====
Republican primary results
Party	Candidate	Votes	%
Republican	James C. Moylan	2,436	
Republican	William M. Castro (incumbent)	2,387	
Republican	Mary Camacho Torres (incumbent)	2,200	
Republican	Louise Borja Muna (incumbent)	2,197	
Republican	Amanda Francel Blas	2,119	
Republican	Telo Teresa Taitague	1,959	
Republican	Julius "Caesar" P. Santos	1,952	
Republican	Benito S. Servino	1,890	
Republican	Michelle Hope Taitano	1,830	
Republican	Jose A. San Agustin	1,767	
Republican	Stephen Joseph Guerrero	1,749	
Republican	Roland Ray Blas	1,574	
Republican	Ken Joe M. Ada	1,492	
Republican	Harold John Cruz	1,482	
Republican	Jenei Adame Aguon	1,472	
Republican	Ryan Jerome Calvo	1,442	
Republican	Javier M. Atalig	1,322	
Republican	Jeffrey Carl Wheaton	1,079	
Republican	Alfredo Oalican Antonin Jr.	923	
Republican	Write-in candidates	120	.15
Turnout		49,249	

==== Eliminated candidates ====
Four Republican hopefuls were eliminated in the 2018 primaries:

- Alfredo Antonin
- Javier Atalig
- Jeffrey Wheaton
- Ryan Jerome "RJ" Calvo

== General election ==
=== Results ===
The members of the legislature are elected at-large with the first 15 winning candidates elected as the new members of the legislature. The Democratic Party picked up one seat from Republicans, leaving the composition for the next legislature at 10 Democrats and 5 Republicans. Democrat Michael F.Q. San Nicolas also won the race for Delegate.

2018 Guam legislative election results
Party	Candidate	Votes	%
Democratic	Therese M. Terlaje (incumbent)	22,450	
Democratic	Telena M.C. Nelson (incumbent)	20,335	
Democratic	Joe S. San Agustin (incumbent)	19,339	
Democratic	Tina Muña Barnes	19,444	
Republican	Mary Camacho Torres (incumbent)	18,716	
Democratic	Amanda L. Shelton	18,453	
Democratic	Regine Biscoe Lee (incumbent)	18,279	
Republican	James C. Moylan	17,603	
Republican	Louise Borja Muna (incumbent)	16,376	
Democratic	Clynton E. Ridgell	15,777	
Democratic	Kelly Marsh Taitano	15,044	
Republican	William M. Castro (incumbent)	14,280	
Democratic	Sabina E.F. Perez	12,297	
Republican	Telo Teresa Taitague	12,263	
Democratic	Jose "Pedo" T. Terlaje	11,840	
Democratic	Celestin C. Babauta	11,768	
Democratic	Adolpho B. Palacios Sr.	11,721	
Democratic	Jermaine Alerta	11,616	
Republican	Stephen Joseph Guerrero	10,658	
Republican	Benito S. Servino	10,502	
Republican	Amanda Francel Blas	10,435	
Democratic	Lasia A. Casil	10,365	
Democratic	Jack Eugene Hattig III	10,141	
Republican	Michele Hope Taitano	9,109	
Republican	Julius Perez Santos	9,069	
Republican	Jose A. San Agustin	7,946	
Republican	Jenei Adame Aguon	7,891	
Republican	Roland Ray Blas	7,546	
Republican	Ken Joe M. Ada	7,364	
Republican	Harold John Cruz	7,124	
Majority		3,780	
Turnout		118,689	
Democratic gain from Republican			

== Incoming Senators to the 35th Guam Legislature ==
There were 15 senators elected on November 6, 2018, to serve in the 35th Guam Legislature and were inaugurated on January 7, 2019:

=== Democratic ===
==== Incumbents ====
- Joe S. San Agustin
- Telena Nelson
- Therese M. Terlaje
- Regine Biscoe Lee

==== Freshman ====
- Tina Muna Barnes (returning)
- Amanda Shelton
- Clynt Ridgell
- Sabina E. Perez
- Jose "Pedo" T. Terlaje
- Kelly G. Marsh (Taitano)

=== Republican ===
==== Incumbents ====
- Mary Camacho Torres
- Louisa "Louise" Borja Muna
- William "Wil" M. Castro

==== Freshman ====
- Telo Taitague (returning)
- James C. Moylan

== See also ==
- 2018 Guam gubernatorial election
- 2018 Guam general election
