= 2020 Guamanian legislative election =

- November 3, 2020

All 15 seats of the Legislature of Guam
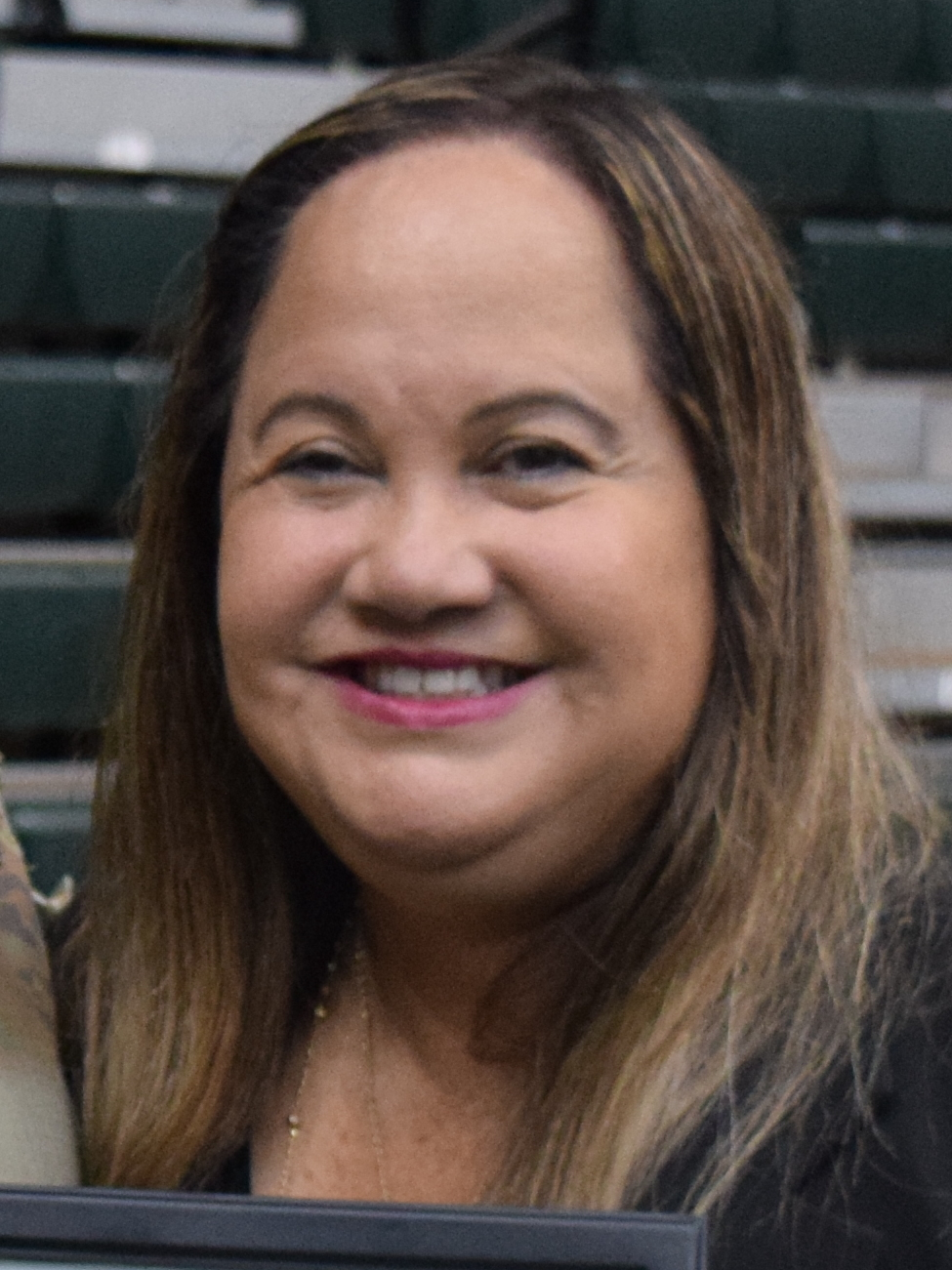

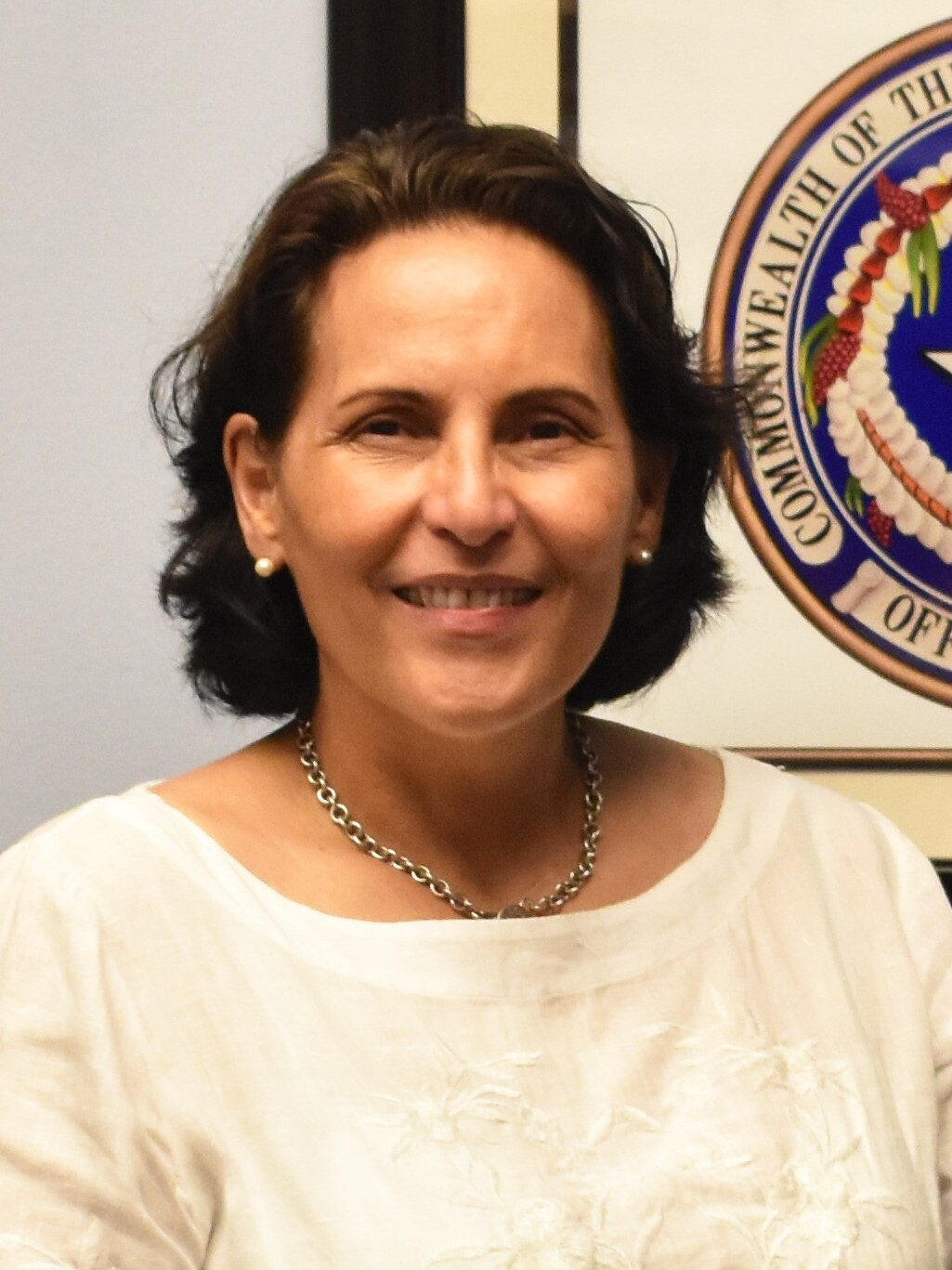
	Majority party	Minority party
Leader	Tina Rose Muna Barnes	Telo T. Taitague
Party	Democratic	Republican
Leader's seat	At-large district	At-large district
Seats before	10	5
Seats won	8	7
Seat change	▼2	▲2
Speaker before election
Tina Rose Muña Barnes
Democratic
Elected Speaker
Therese M. Terlaje
Democratic

Legislative elections were held in Guam on Tuesday, November 3, 2020, along with the election for the Guam delegate to the U.S. House of Representatives. Before the election, the Democratic Party held ten of the fifteen seats in the Legislature while the Republican Party held five seats. The election resulted in a gain of two seats for the Republican and a loss of two seats for Democrats to retain. Democrats also won the runoff race for Guam's US House Delegate.

== Primary ==
Because of the COVID-19 pandemic, Guam cancelled its August primary elections. All 29 certified candidates advanced to the Legislative general election and appeared on the ballot in November 2020.

== Candidates ==
=== Democratic ===
==== Declared ====
- Therese M. Terlaje (I)
- Clynton "Clynt" E. Ridgell (I)
- Sabina Eileen Perez (I)
- Joe S. San Agustin (I)
- Frank "Chief" G. Leon Guerrero
- Fred Eugene Bordallo Jr.
- Franklin Joseph Meno
- John Albert Ananich II
- Amanda L. Shelton (I)
- Jose "Pedo" T. Terlaje (I)
- Tina Rose Muna Barnes (I)
- Telena Nelson (I)
- David "Dave" Ralph Duenas
- Kelly G. Marsh (Taitano) (I)
- Christopher L. Carillo

==== Declined ====
- Regine Biscoe Lee

=== Republican ===
- Dominic Joaquin Hernandez
- James "Jim" Camacho Moylan (I)
- Vicente Anthony "Tony" Ada
- Joaquin Vicente Leon Guerrero
- Christopher M. Duenas
- Frank Flores Blas Jr.
- Telo Teresa Taitague (I)
- Joanne M. Brown
- Vincent A.V. Borja
- Don Antonio Ada Edquilane
- Mary Camacho Torres (I)
- Michelle Lynn Armenta
- Sandra Reyes Seau
- Joseph Iglesias "JI" Cruz

==== Withdrew ====
- Louisa Borja Muna
- Ryan Joseph "RJ" Calvo

==== Declined ====
- William "Wil" M. Castro (running for Delegate)

== Results ==
The members of the legislature are elected at-large with the first 15 winning candidates elected as the new members of the legislature. The Republican Party picked up two seats from Democrats, leaving the composition for the next legislature at 8 Democrats and 7 Republicans. Democrat Michael F.Q. San Nicolas also won the re-election for the runoff Delegate.

General election results
Party	Candidate	Votes	%
Democratic	Therese M. Terlaje (incumbent)	18,993	
Republican	James Camacho Moylan (incumbent)	17,228	
Democratic	Telena M.C. Nelson (incumbent)	15,195	
Democratic	Joe Shimizu San Agustin (incumbent)	15,121	
Republican	Mary Camacho Torres (incumbent)	14,892	
Republican	Vicente Anthony "Tony" Ada	13,848	
Democratic	Amanda Shelton (incumbent)	13,571	
Republican	Telo Teresa Taitague (incumbent)	13,468	
Republican	Frank F. Blas Jr.	13,225	
Democratic	Tina Rose Muña Barnes (incumbent)	11,850	
Democratic	Clynt E. Ridgell (incumbent)	11,530	
Republican	Christopher M. Duenas	11,246	
Republican	Joanne M. Brown	10,226	
Democratic	Sabina E.F. Perez (incumbent)	9,976	
Democratic	Jose "Pedo" T. Terlaje (incumbent)	9,774	
Democratic	Kelly Marsh Taitano (incumbent)	9,283	
Democratic	John A. Ananich II	9,092	
Republican	Vincent A.V. Borja	8,746	
Democratic	Fred E. Bordallo Jr.	8,713	
Democratic	Frank G. Leon Guerrero	8,356	
Republican	Joaquin Vicente Leon Guerrero	7,805	
Republican	Joseph "J.I." Iglesias Cruz	7,119	
Republican	Sandra Reyes Seau	6,525	
Republican	Michelle Lynn Armenta	6,239	
Democratic	Franklin J. Meno	5,313	
Republican	Christopher L. Carillo	4,842	
Democratic	David Ralph Duenas	4,746	
Republican	Dominic Joaquin Hernandez	4,158	
Republican	Don Antonio Ada Edquilane	3,185	
—	Overvotes	3,540	
—	Undervotes	142,371	
Democratic hold			

== Incoming Senators to the 36th Guam Legislature ==
There were 15 senators elected on November 3, 2020, to serve in the 36th Guam Legislature and set to inaugurated on January 4, 2021:

=== Democratic ===
==== Incumbents ====
- Joe S. San Agustin
- Telena Nelson
- Therese M. Terlaje
- Tina Muña Barnes
- Amanda Shelton
- Clynt Ridgell
- Sabina E. Perez
- Jose "Pedo" T. Terlaje

=== Republican ===
==== Incumbents ====
- Mary Camacho Torres
- Telo T. Taitague
- James C. Moylan

==== Freshman ====
- Frank F. Blas Jr. (returning)
- V. Anthony "Tony" Ada (returning)
- Joanne M. Brown (returning)
- Christopher M. Duenas (returning)

== See also ==
- 2020 Guam local election
- 2020 Guam general election
