= 2022 Guamanian legislative election =

- November 8, 2022

All 15 seats of the Legislature of Guam 8 seats needed for a majority
- Turnout: 56.36%
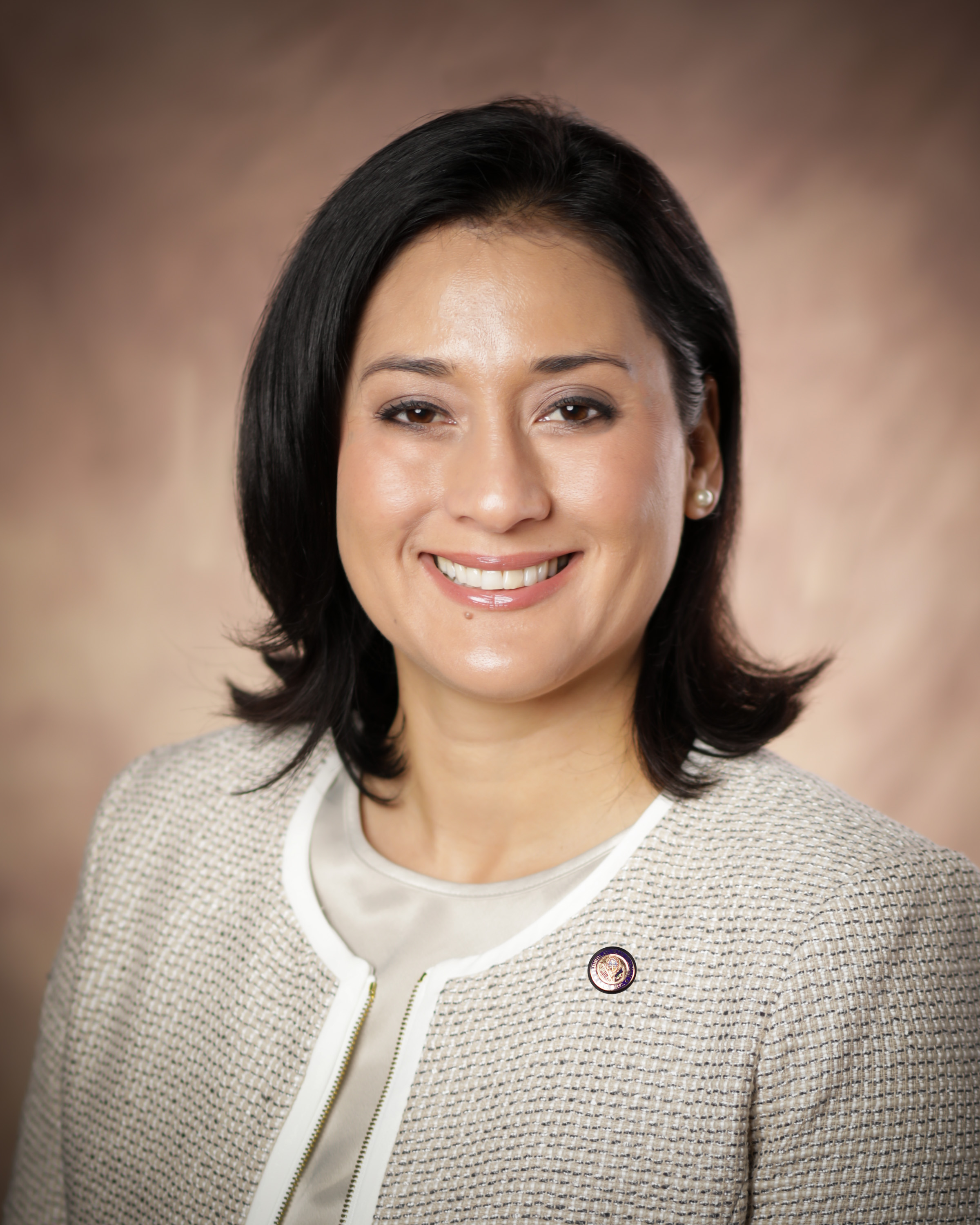

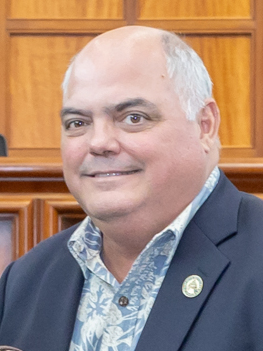
	Majority party	Minority party
Leader	Telena Cruz Nelson	Christopher M. Duenas
Party	Democratic	Republican
Leader's seat	At-large district	At-large district
Seats before	8	7
Seats after	9	6
Seat change	▲1	▼1
Speaker before election
Therese M. Terlaje
Democratic
Elected Speaker
Therese M. Terlaje
Democratic

Legislative elections were held Guam on November 8, 2022, along with the election for the Guam delegate to the U.S. House of Representatives. Before the election, the Democratic Party holds eight of the fifteen seats in the Legislature while the Republican Party holds seven seats. The election resulted in a gain of one seat for the Democrats and a loss of one seat for Republicans. Republicans have won the race for Guam's US House Delegate for the first time since 1993.

== Candidates ==
=== Democratic ===
==== Declared ====
- Therese M. Terlaje (I)
- Sabina Eileen Perez (I)
- Joe S. San Agustin (I)
- Amanda L. Shelton (I)
- Jose "Pedo" T. Terlaje (I)
- Tina Rose Muna Barnes (I)
- Kelly G. Marsh (Taitano)
- Roy Anthony B. Quinata
- Fred Eugene Bordallo Jr.
- Franklin Joseph Meno
- John Albert Ananich II
- David "Dave" Ralph Duenas
- Sarah M. Thomas-Nededog
- William D. Parkinson
- Dwayne T. San Nicolas
- Darrel "Chris" Barnett
- Alexander M. Duenas
- Jonathan J. Savares
- Armando S. Dominguez
- Roy Lawrence Gamboa
- Angela Therese Ann Marie
Santos

==== Declined ====
- Telena Nelson (running for delegate)
- Clynt E. Ridgell

=== Republican ===
==== Declared ====
- Christopher M. Duenas (I)
- Frank Flores Blas Jr. (I)
- Telo Teresa Taitague (I)
- Joanne M. Brown (I)
- Jesse Anderson Lujan
- David W. Crisostomo
- Shirley "Sam" Mabini-Young
- Maryann "Mana" Silva Taijeron
- Vincent A.V. Borja
- Joaquin "Ken" Leon Guerrero
- Michelle Hope Taitano
- Sandra Reyes Seau
- Thomas J. Fisher
- Bistra Mendiola
- Ian Dale Catling

==== Declined ====
- Vicente Anthony "Tony" Ada (running for lieutenant governor)
- Mary Camacho Torres
- James C. Moylan (running for delegate)

==== Disqualified ====
- Don Antonio Ada Edquilane

== Primary Election ==
Primary elections in Guam were held on August 27, 2022. The top 15 candidates who receive the highest votes for each party will move on to the general election.

=== Results ===
==== Democratic primary results ====
Democratic primary results
Party	Candidate	Votes	%
Democratic	Therese M. Terlaje (incumbent)	14,225	8.33%
Democratic	Darrel Christopher Barnett	12,788	7.49%
Democratic	Joe S. San Agustin (incumbent)	11,793	6.91%
Democratic	Amanda L. Shelton (incumbent)	13,542	6.49%
Democratic	Tina Muña Barnes (incumbent)	10,657	6.24%
Democratic	Roy A. B. Quinata	9,104	5.33%
Democratic	Sabina E.F. Perez (incumbent)	9,104	5.12%
Democratic	William M. Parkinson	8,510	4.99%
Democratic	Sarah M. T. Nededog	8,351	4.89%
Democratic	Kelly Marsh Taitano	8,036	4.71%
Democratic	Fred E. Bordallo, Jr.	8,021	4.70%
Democratic	Jose "Pedo" T. Terlaje (incumbent)	7,753	4.54%
Democratic	Dwayne San Nicolas	7,538	4.42%
Democratic	Jonathan Savares	7,050	4.13%
Democratic	Angela Santos	6,740	3.95%
Democratic	Roy L. Gamboa	5,957	3.49%
Democratic	Alexander M. Duenas	5,782	3.39%
Democratic	John Anaich II	5,216	3.06%
Democratic	David R. Duenas	5,009	2.93%
Democratic	Franklin J. Meno	4,663	2.73%
Democratic	Armando S. Dominguez	3,442	2.02%
Democratic	Write-in candidates	248	0.15%
Turnout		170,696	

==== Eliminated candidates ====
Six Democrats hopefuls were eliminated in the 2022 primaries:

- Roy L. Gamboa
- Alexander M. Duenas
- John Anaich II
- David R. Duenas
- Franklin J. Meno
- Armando S. Dominguez

==== Republican Party Primary ====
Republican primary results
Party	Candidate	Votes	%
Republican	Frank Flores Blas, Jr. (incumbent)	2,397	8.16%
Republican	Christopher M. Duenas (incumbent)	2,378	8.9%
Republican	Jesse Anderson Lujan	2,158	7.35%
Republican	Joanne M. Brown (incumbent)	2,087	7.10%
Republican	Thomas J. Fisher	2,081	7.08%
Republican	Maryann Silva Taijeron	2,031	6.31%
Republican	Telo Taitague (incumbent)	1,968	6.70%
Republican	MiChelle Hope Taitano	1,940	6.60%
Republican	Vincent A.V. Borja	1,818	6.19%
Republican	Shirley A. Mabini Young	1,712	5.83%
Republican	David Walter Crisostomo	1,678	5.71%
Republican	Joaquin V. Leo Guerrero	1,670	5.68%
Republican	Sandra Reyes Seau	1,664	5.66%
Republican	Bistra Ivanova Mendiola	1,603	5.46%
Republican	Ian Dale Catling	1,182	4.02%
Republican	Harvey Egna	964	3.28%
Republican	Write-in candidates	49	0.17%
Turnout		29,380	

==== Eliminated candidates ====
One Republican hopeful was eliminated in the 2022 primaries:

- Harvey Egna

== General Election ==
Party	Votes	%	Seats	+/–
Democratic Party	218,837	58.71	9	+1
Republican Party	153,300	41.13	6	–1
Write-in	574	0.15	–	–
Total	372,711	100.00	15	–
Total votes	34,074	–		
Registered voters/turnout	60,465	56.35		
Source: Guam Election Commission

=== Results ===
The members of the legislature are elected at-large with the first 15 winning candidates elected as the new members of the legislature. The Democratic Party picked up one seat from Republicans, leaving the composition for the next legislature at 9 Democrats and 6 Republicans. Despite Democrats remaining the majority in the legislature, Republicans took the Delegate seat for the first time since 1993 with James C. Moylan winning the race.

2022 Guam legislative election results
Party	Candidate	Votes	%
Democratic	Therese M. Terlaje (incumbent)	22,127	5.94%
Democratic	Darrel Christopher Barnett	21,515	5.77%
Democratic	Amanda L. Shelton (incumbent)	17,915	4.81%
Democratic	Joe S. San Agustin (incumbent)	17,601	4.72%
Democratic	Tina Muña Barnes (incumbent)	16,897	4.53%
Republican	Frank Flores Blas, Jr. (incumbent)	15,590	4.18%
Republican	Thomas J. Fisher	14,212	3.73%
Democratic	Roy A. B. Quinata	13,903	3.73%
Democratic	William M. Parkinson	13,709	3.68%
Republican	Christopher M. Duenas (incumbent)	13,434	3.60%
Democratic	Dwayne T. San Nicolas	12,919	3.47%
Republican	Telo Taitague (incumbent)	12,492	3.35%
Democratic	Sabina E.F. Perez (incumbent)	12,330	3.31%
Republican	Joanne M. Brown (incumbent)	12,233	3.28%
Republican	Jesse Anderson Lujan	12,134	3.26%
Democratic	Kelly Marsh Taitano	11,750	3.15%
Republican	Maryann Silva Taijeron	11,593	3.11%
Democratic	Sarah M. T. Nededog	11,576	3.11%
Democratic	Jonathan J. Savares	11,471	3.08%
Democratic	Jose "Pedo" T. Terlaje (incumbent)	11,012	2.95%
Democratic	Fred E. Bordallo, Jr.	11,008	2.95%
Republican	Vincent A. Borja	10,533	2.83%
Republican	MiChelle Hope Taitano	10,265	2.75%
Republican	Shirley A. Mabini Young	10,021	2.69%
Democratic	Angela Therese Santos	9,104	2.44%
Republican	Joaquin V. Leon Guerrero	8,809	2.36%
Republican	Sandra Reyes Seau	7,827	2.10%
Republican	Bistra Ivanova Mendiola	7,514	2.02%
Republican	David Walter Crisostomo	6,960	1.87%
Republican	Ian Dale Catling	3,683	0.99%
Majority		N/A	
Turnout		372,711	
Democratic gain from Republican			

== Incoming Senators to the 37th Guam Legislature ==
There were 15 senators elected on November 8, 2022, to serve in the 37th Guam Legislature and were inaugurated in January 2023:

=== Democratic ===
==== Incumbents ====
- Therese M. Terlaje
- Amanda Shelton
- Joe S. San Agustin
- Tina Muna Barnes
- Sabina E.F. Perez

==== Freshman ====
- Darrel Christopher Barnett
- Roy A. B. Quinata
- William M. Parkinson
- Dwayne T. San Nicolas

=== Republican ===
==== Incumbents ====
- Frank F. Blas, Jr.
- Christopher M. Duenas
- Telo Taitague
- Joanne M. Brown

==== Freshman ====
- Thomas J. Fisher
- Jesse A. Lujan (returning)
