= 2016 Guamanian legislative election =

- November 8, 2016

All 15 seats of the Legislature of Guam

	Majority party	Minority party
Leader	Judith Won Pat (lost re-election)	V. Anthony "Tony" Ada (lost re-election)
Party	Democratic	Republican
Leader's seat	At-large district	At-large district
Last election	9 seats	6 seats
Seats won	9	6
Seat change	Steady	Steady
Popular vote	218,767	171,768
Percentage	55.95%	43.92%
Speaker before election
Judith Won Pat
Democratic
Elected Speaker
Benjamin Cruz
Democratic

Legislative elections were held in Guam on Tuesday, November 8, 2016, along with the election for the Guam delegate to the U.S. House of Representatives. The Democratic Party won nine of the fifteen seats in the Legislature and maintained control of Guam's delegate seat. The fifteen elected members of the 34th Guam Legislature were inaugurated on January 2, 2017.

== Results ==
=== Legislature ===
Party	Votes	%	Seats	+/–
Democratic Party	218,767	55.95%	9	
Republican Party	171,768	43.92%	6	
Write-in votes	471	0.12	–	–
Total	391,006	100	15	0
Registered voters/turnout	51,713	67	–	–

== Candidates ==
=== Democratic ===
- Michael F. Q. San Nicolas (I)
- Vice Speaker Benjamin J.F. Cruz (I)
- Nerissa Bretania Underwood (I)
- Speaker Judith T. Won Pat (I)
- Therese M. Terlaje
- Thomas "Tom" C. Ada (I)
- Telena Cruz Nelson
- Regine Biscoe Lee
- Jermaine Alerta
- Fred E. Bordallo Jr.
- Frank Blas Aguon Jr. (I)
- Rory Respicio (I)
- Tina Rose Muña Barnes (I)
- Dennis G. Rodriguez Jr. (I)
- Joe S. San Agustin

==== Eliminated ====
- Victor Anthony Gaza
- Armando S. Dominguez

=== Republican ===
- Brant Thomas McCreadie (I)
- Albert John Balajadia
- James V. Espaldon (I)
- Jose Acfalle San Agustin
- William Mendiola Castro
- Louise Borja Muna
- Fernando Barcinas Esteves
- Thomas "Tommy" Aaron Morrison (I)
- Vicente Anthony "Tony" Ada (I)
- Frank Flores Blas Jr. (I)
- Christopher M. Duenas
- Amanda Francel Blas
- Mary Camacho Torres (I)
- Eric Mantanona Palacios
- Benito Santos Servino

==== Eliminated ====
- Barry Robert Mead
- Ellery M. Paz

== Primary Election ==
The members are elected at-large with the first 15 winning candidates are elected as the new members of the legislature. As there were many candidates running, primaries were set on August 27, 2016 for both the Democratic and Republican parties. The first fifteen candidates who win the highest votes go on to the General election.

=== Democratic Party Primary ===
Democratic Party of Guam primary election, 2016
Party	Candidate	Votes	%
Democratic	Frank B. Aguon Jr. (incumbent)	9,381	
Democratic	Michael San Nicolas (incumbent)	9,381	
Democratic	Therese M. Terlaje	9,149	
Democratic	Benjamin J.F. Cruz (incumbent)	8,221	
Democratic	Telena M.C. Nelson (incumbent)	7,985	
Democratic	Dennis G. Rodriguez Jr. (incumbent)	7,736	
Democratic	Thomas C. Ada (incumbent)	7,270	
Democratic	Joe Shimizu San Agustin	7,217	
Democratic	Nerissa Bretania Underwood (incumbent)	7,022	
Democratic	Tina Muña Barnes (incumbent)	6,869	
Democratic	Judith Won Pat (incumbent)	6,526	
Democratic	Regine Biscoe Lee	6,281	
Democratic	Rory J. Respicio (incumbent)	6,278	
Democratic	Fred E. Bordallo Jr.	6,014	
Democratic	Jermaine Alerta	5,562	
Democratic	Victor Anthony Gaza	4,462	
Democratic	Armando S. Dominguez	3,649	

==== Eliminated candidates ====
Two Democratic hopefuls were eliminated in the 2016 primaries:

- Victor Gaza
- Armando Dominguez

=== Republican Party Primary ===
Republican Party of Guam primary election, 2016
Party	Candidate	Votes	%
Republican	Frank F. Blas Jr. (incumbent)	5,315	
Republican	William M. Castro	5,266	
Republican	Thomas A. "Tommy" Morrison (incumbent)	5,248	
Republican	Vicente Anthony "Tony" Ada (incumbent)	5,185	
Republican	Louise Borja Muna	5,036	
Republican	James Espaldon (incumbent)	4,996	
Republican	Christopher M. Duenas (incumbent)	4,796	
Republican	Mary Camacho Torres (incumbent)	4,543	
Republican	Eric M. Palacios	3,970	
Republican	Fernando B. Esteves	3,875	
Republican	Jose Acfalle San Agustin	3,806	
Republican	Brant T. McCreadie (incumbent)	3,795	
Republican	Amanda Francel Blas	3,748	
Republican	Albert J. "AJ" Balajadia	3,478	
Republican	Benito S. Servino	3,387	
Republican	Barry R. Mead	2,680	
Republican	Ellery M. Paz	2,150	

==== Eliminated candidates ====
Two Republican hopefuls were eliminated in the 2016 primaries:

- Barry Mead
- Ellery Paz

== General election results ==
Following the primaries, there were 26 candidates vying for the 15 seats in the Legislature of Guam. The members are elected at-large with the first 15 winning candidates elected as the new members of the legislature.

2016 Guam legislative election (Top 15 winning candidates)
Party	Candidate	Votes	%
Democratic	Frank B. Aguon Jr. (incumbent)	21,070	5.39
Democratic	Michael San Nicolas (incumbent)	19,686	5.03
Democratic	Therese M. Terlaje (incumbent)	19,681	5.03
Democratic	Dennis G. Rodriguez Jr. (incumbent)	17,600	4.50
Democratic	Telena M.C. Nelson	16,922	4.33
Republican	William Mendiola Castro	15,599	3.99
Republican	James Espaldon (incumbent)	14,998	3.84
Democratic	Regine Biscoe Lee	14,864	3.80
Republican	Mary Camacho Torres (incumbent)	14,792	3.78
Democratic	Benjamin J.F. Cruz (incumbent)	14,436	3.69
Republican	Louise Borja Muna	13,666	3.50
Republican	Thomas A. "Tommy" Morrison (incumbent)	13,634	3.49
Democratic	Thomas C. Ada (incumbent)	13,053	3.34
Republican	Fernando Barcinas Esteves	12,982	3.32
Democratic	Joe Shimizu San Shimizu	12,532	
Democratic	Tina Muña Barnes (incumbent)	12,510	
Democratic	Nerissa Bretania Underwood (incumbent)	12,325	
Republican	Vicente Anthony "Tony" Ada (incumbent)	12,023	
Republican	Frank F. Blas Jr. (incumbent)	12,005	
Democratic	Judith T.P. Won Pat (incumbent)	11,942	
Democratic	Rory J. Respicio (incumbent)	11,920	
Republican	Christopher M. Duenas (incumbent)	10,934	
Democratic	Jermaine Alerta	10,667	
Democratic	Fred Eugene Bordallo Jr.	9,559	
Republican	Amanda Francel Blas	9,533	
Republican	Eric Matanona Palacios	9,451	
Republican	Benito Santos Servino	9,332	
Republican	Albert J. Balajadia	8,668	
Republican	Jose Acfalle San Agustin	7,069	
Republican	Brant T. McCredie (incumbent)	7,063	
Majority		n/a	
Turnout		n/a	
Democratic gain from Republican			

== Incoming Senators to the 34th Guam Legislature ==
There were 15 senators elected on November 8, 2016 to serve in the 34th Guam Legislature and were inaugurated on January 2, 2017:

=== Democratic ===
==== Incumbents ====
- Benjamin Cruz
- Thomas C. Ada
- Dennis G. Rodriguez Jr.
- Frank B. Aguon Jr.
- Michael San Nicolas

==== Freshman ====
- Regine Biscoe Lee
- Telena Nelson
- Joe Shimizu San Agustin
- Therese M. Terlaje

=== Republican ===
==== Incumbents ====
- Thomas Aaron Morrison
- James V. Espaldon
- Mary Camacho Torres

==== Freshman ====
- William Mendiola Castro
- Louisa Borja Muna
- Fernando Barcinas Esteves
