= Tina Rose Muña Barnes =

Guamanian politician

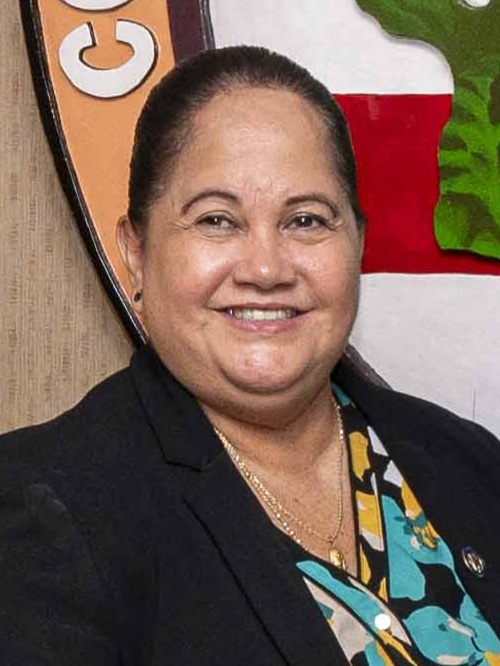

Vice Speaker of the Guam Legislature
- In office January 4, 2021 – January 6, 2025
- Preceded by: Telena Nelson
- Succeeded by: Tony Ada

Speaker of the Guam Legislature
- In office January 7, 2019 – January 4, 2021
- Preceded by: Therese M. Terlaje (Acting)
- Succeeded by: Therese M. Terlaje

Legislative Secretary of the Guam Legislature
- In office January 5, 2009 – January 2, 2017
- Preceded by: Ray Tenorio
- Succeeded by: Regine Biscoe Lee

Member of the Guam Legislature
- Incumbent
- Assumed office January 7, 2019
- In office January 1, 2007 – January 2, 2017
- In office January 6, 2003 – January 3, 2005

Personal details
- Born: August 24, 1962 (age 63)
- Party: Democratic
- Spouse: Jake Barnes
- Children: 4

Tina Rose Muña Barnes (born August 24, 1962) is a Guamanian politician, currently serving her 7th term as a senator in the Guam Legislature. She formerly served as the Speaker of the 35th Guam Legislature from 2019 to 2021.

== Family ==
Tina Muña Barnes, born August 24, 1962, is the daughter of William Pereira "Bill" Muña and Ana Atoigue "Ann" Muña.

== Career ==
Barnes has worked for Public Defender Service Corporation, the Law Office of Brooks and Klitzkie, Atkins Kroll Toyota, and Guam Autospot. Barnes was appointed by Governor Carl T.C. Gutierrez to serve as deputy director of the Department of Integrated Services for Individuals with Disabilities.

== Personal life ==
Tina is an athlete, having played softball, basketball and volleyball in Guam, and for teams representing Guam at the South Pacific and Oceania Games in 1987, 1989 and 1991. She was a South Pacific Games Commission member in Tahiti in 1995, and Guam basketball tournament director in the 1994 Micronesian Games. She is married to baseball member Jacob Cruz "Jake" Barnes and have four children (Tiffany, Coby, Jathan and Minna), including five grandchildren.

== Guam Legislature ==
=== Elections ===
Barnes was elected to the 27th Guam Legislature in the general election of 2002. In the 2004 election, she failed to win reelection, but Barnes won a seat in the 2006 election and remained in the legislature for 5 consecutive terms. She failed to win reelection in 2016, but Barnes returned to the Guam Legislature after winning a seat in the 35th Guam Legislature, where she is currently serving as Speaker. In addition to becoming Speaker of the Guam Legislature, Muña Barnes also serves as the Oversight Chairwoman for the Committee on Public Accountability, Human Resources and the Guam Buildup.

Election	Legislature	Primary Rank (Votes)	General Rank (Votes)	Result
2002	27th Guam Legislature	5 (12,995)	9 (22,187)	Elected
2004	28th Guam Legislature	5 (7,666)	17 (13,889)	Not elected
2006	29th Guam Legislature	6 (13,998)	11 (18,425)	Elected
2008	30th Guam Legislature	5 (7,317)	10 (16,116)	Elected
2010	31st Guam Legislature	2 (6,149)	3 (21,149)	Elected
2012	32nd Guam Legislature	4 (6,833)	11 (14,746)	Elected
2014	33rd Guam Legislature	6 (5,918)	11 (16,635)	Elected
2016	34th Guam Legislature	10 (6,896)	16 (12,510)	Not elected
2018	35th Guam Legislature	5 (13,499)	4 (18,885)	Elected
2020	36th Guam Legislature	No Primary	10 (11,850)	Elected
2022	37th Guam Legislature	5 (10,657)	5 (16,897)	Elected
2024	38th Guam Legislature	4 (7,851)	5 (14,662)	Elected

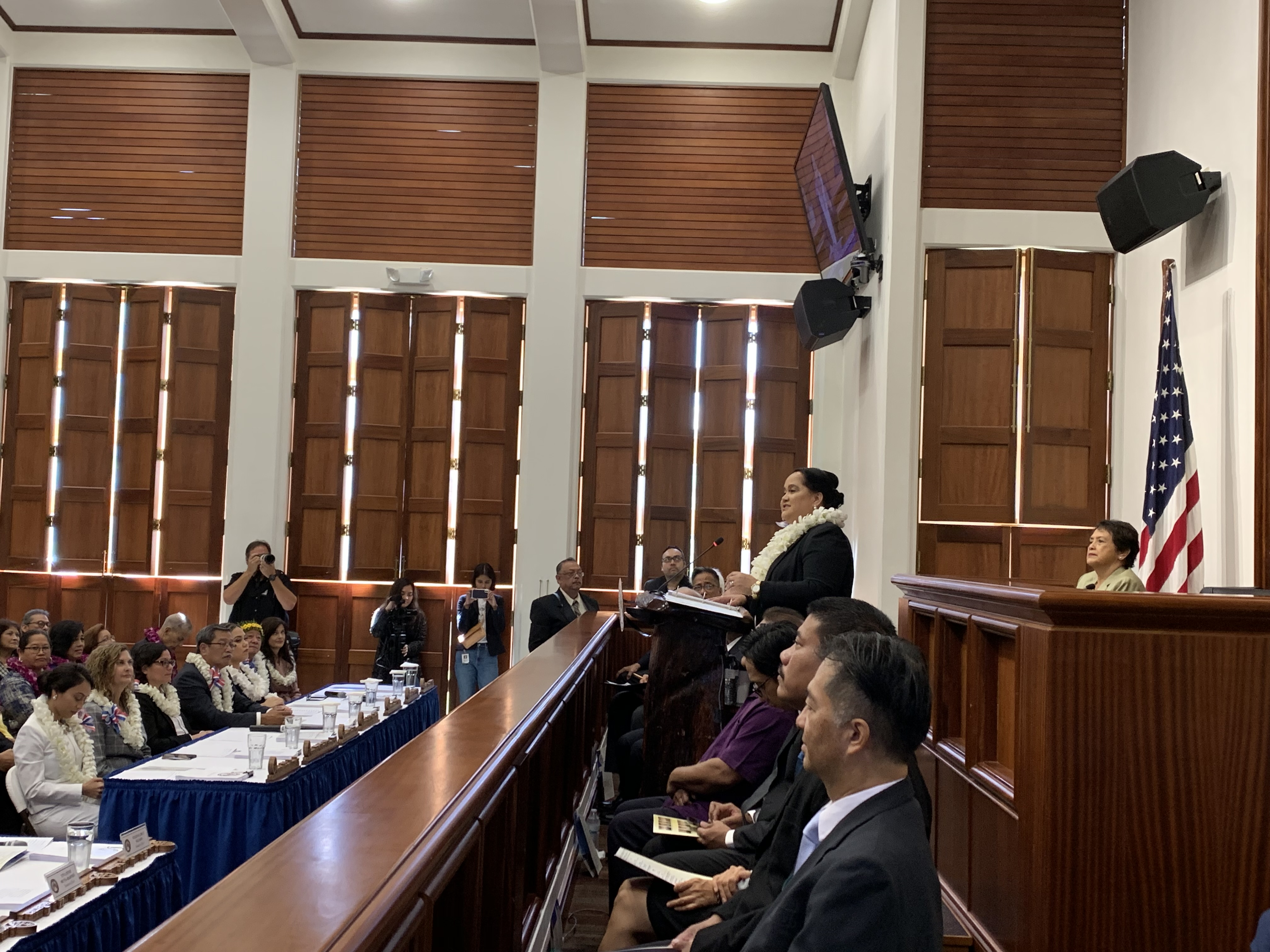

=== Speakership ===
Speaker Tina Rose Muña Barnes was elected as Speaker by a majority of her Democratic Caucus, after shoring up more votes from her colleagues compared to Acting Speaker Therese Terlaje. During her tenure as Speaker of the 35th Guam Legislature, and focused on improving the economy of Guam, Muña Barnes focused on implementing many of the revenue generating laws that she had passed in her tenure in the Guam Legislature.

==== War Claims ====
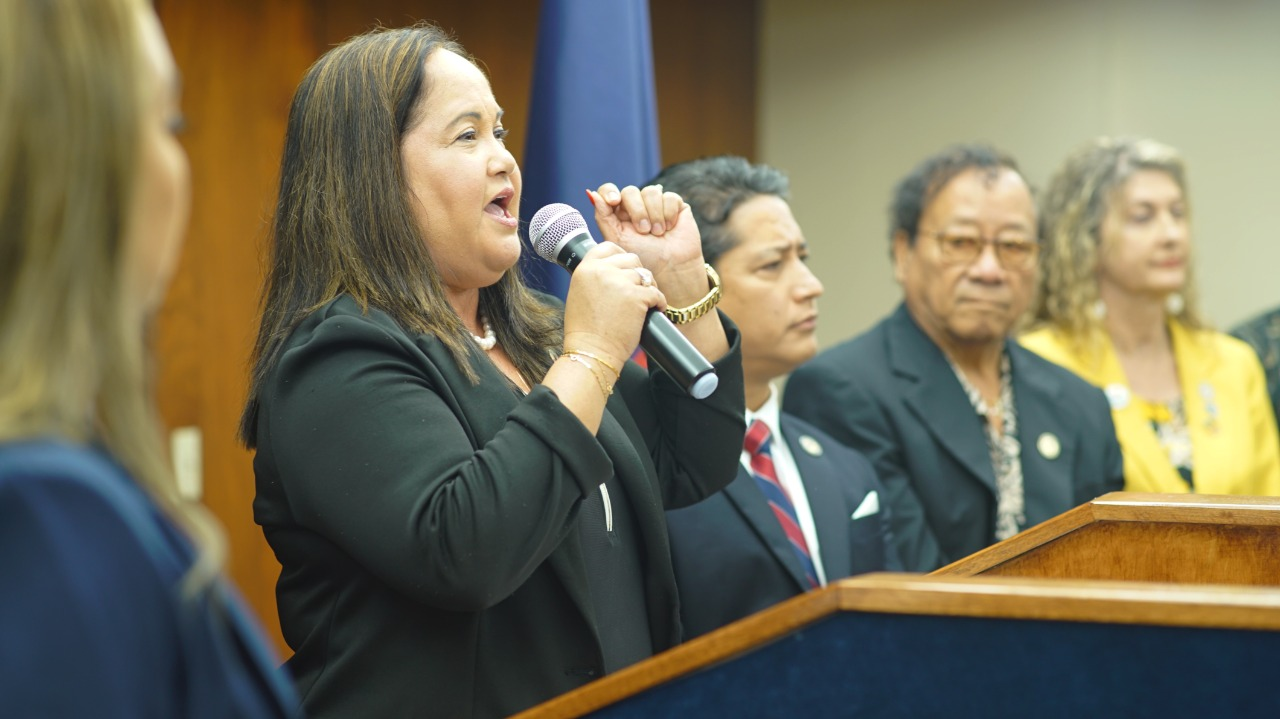
Flanked by her colleagues from the 35th Guam Legislature, Speaker Muña Barnes addresses Guam's World War II survivors at the Bill signing ceremony of Bill 181–35 at the Ricardo Bordallo Governor's Complex in Adelup. .

During her first year as Speaker of the 35th Guam Legislature, coinciding with the 75th year of Guam's Liberation, Speaker Muña Barnes advocated for the compensation of Guam's World War II survivors who were abused during the Japanese occupation of Guam. The Speaker, along with Legislative Secretary Amanda Shelton and Minority Leader William Castro introduced legislation July 2019 to pay off living compensable Guam victims with adjudicated claims. At the request of Guam's Delegate to Congress, Congressman Michael F.Q. San Nicolas, discussion on this matter was stalled. After months of waiting, Speaker Muña Barnes had called the Guam Legislature into session to address her War Claims Bill. On December 20, 2019, the Speaker's measure was voted on in the Guam Legislature, which passed by a vote of 12–3 to pass.

Votes on Bill 181-35
YES votes	NO Votes
Speaker Tina Muña Barnes, Vice Speaker Telena Nelson, Sens. Wil Castro, Clynton Ridgell, Jose Terlaje, Sabina Perez, Amanda Shelton, Kelly Marsh (Taitano), Regine Biscoe Lee, Joe San Agustin, Therese Terlaje, and Telo Taitague	Sens. Mary Torres, James Moylan and Louise Muna

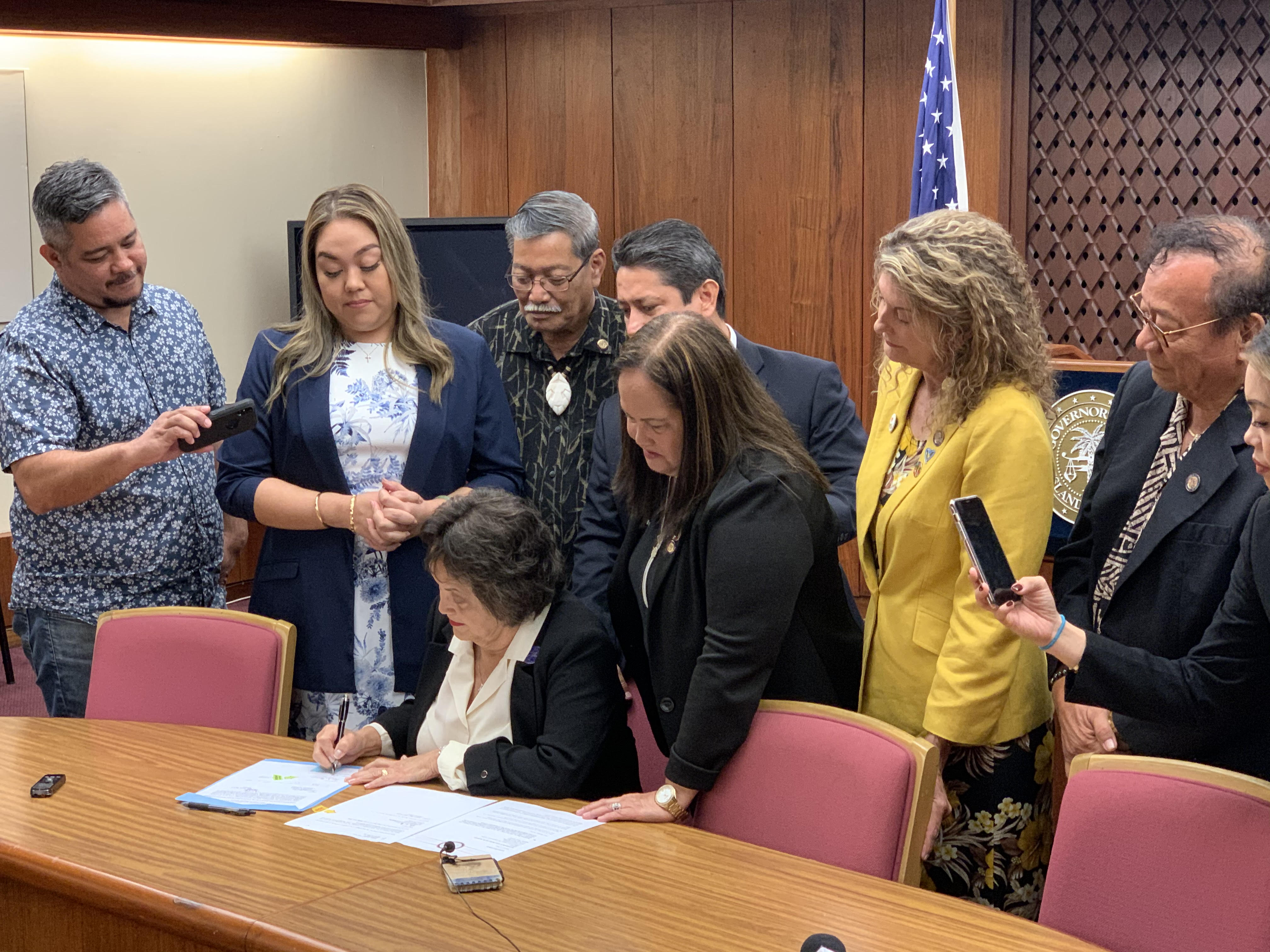
Governor Lou Leon Guerrero Signs Bill 181-35 into law as senators observe from behind.

Surrounded by a roomful of World War II survivors, on January 3, 2020, Speaker Muña Barnes's local legislation to pay war claims was signed into law by Governor Lourdes A. Leon Guerrero. Bill 181–35, the Speaker's War Claims Bill was signed into law as Public Law 35–61.

==== Public Policy Institute ====
As Speaker of the 35th Guam Legislature, Speaker Muña Barnes introduced legislation to create the Public Policy Institute. The Public Policy Institute provides interns exposure to a network of leaders in the public and private sectors as well as professional and training opportunities for them to gain leadership, research, and work place skills and experiences. The institute is a rigorous program where interns have the opportunity to learn first-hand about the island's legislative process by participating in a variety of activities from bill research and writing, organizing and conducting public policy briefings, paging, and by providing executive-level staffing. Interns may also respond to constituent inquiries, draft correspondence, and assist with general office operations. Promising students are selected from public and private schools on Guam and are placed in various offices of the Guam Legislature for an eight-week period over the fall, spring, or summer terms. Interns meet with leaders from a range of professional backgrounds. Interns also take field-trips to other branches of government in order gain a broader understanding of the three branches of government.

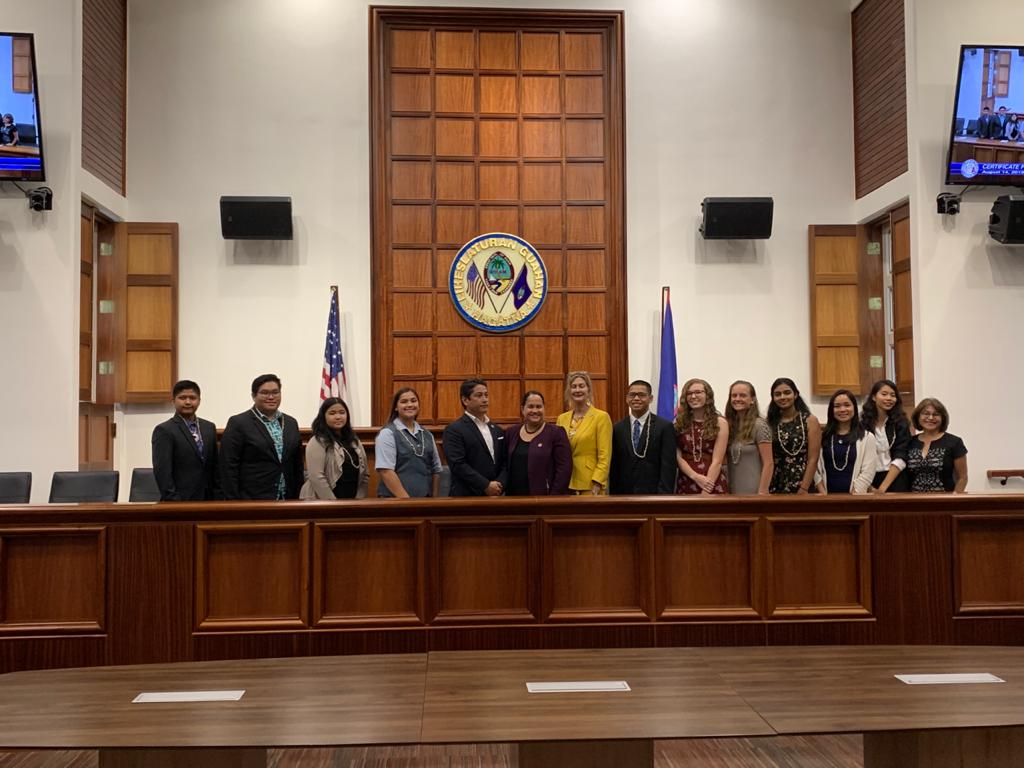
Public Policy Institute Summer 2019 cohort Graduation.

Political offices
Preceded by Therese M. Terlaje; Acting	Speaker of the Guam Legislature; 2019–2021	Succeeded by Therese M. Terlaje
Legislature of Guam
Preceded by Telena Nelson	Vice Speaker of the Guam Legislature; 2021–2025	Succeeded by Tony Ada
