= 37th Guam Legislature =

The 37th Guam Legislature was the meeting of the Guam Legislature that was convened in Hagatna, Guam on January 4, 2021 and ended on January 1, 2023, during Lou Leon Guerrero's Governorship. In the 2022 Guam election, the Democratic Party of Guam won a majority of seats in the Guam Legislature.

== Party summary ==
Affiliation	Party (shading indicates majority caucus)		Total
Affiliation	Democratic	Republican	Total
End of previous legislature	8	7	15
Begin (January 2, 2023)	9	6	15
Latest voting share	60.0%	40.0%	

== Leadership ==
=== Legislative ===
- Speaker: Therese M. Terlaje
- Vice Speaker: Tina Rose Muña Barnes
- Legislative Secretary: Amanda Shelton

=== Minority (Republican) ===
- Minority Leader: Frank F. Blas Jr.
- Minority Whip: Telo T. Taitague

== Membership ==
Senator	Party	Assumed office	Residence	Born
Therese M. Terlaje	Democratic	2017	Mangilao	1964
Tina Rose Muña Barnes	Democratic	2019	Mangilao	1962
Amanda L. Shelton	Democratic	2019	Asan-Maina	1990
Darrel Christopher "Malafunkshun" Barnett	Democratic	2023		
Sabina Perez	Democratic	2019	Barrigada	
Joe S. San Agustin	Democratic	2017	Yigo	1957
Roy A.B. Quinata	Democratic	2023		
William A. Parkinson	Democratic	2023		
Dwayne San Nicolas	Democratic	2023		
Frank F. Blas Jr.	Republican	2021		
Telo T. Taitague	Republican	2019	Tamuning	
Christopher M. Dueñas	Republican	2021		
Joanne M. Brown	Republican	2021		
Jesse A. Lujan	Republican	2023		
Thomas J. Fisher	Republican	2023		

== Committees ==
Committee	Chair	Vice Chair
Committee on Rules	Chris "Malafunkshun" Barnett	Sabina Flores Perez
Committee on Education, Public Safety and the Arts	Chris "Malafunkshun" Barnett, Chairperson	Christopher M. Duenas
Committee on General Government Operations and Appropriations	Joe S. San Agustin	
Committee on Fire, Agriculture, Power and Energy Utilities, Public Transit, Unemployment Insurance and Universal Health Insurance	William Parkinson	
Committee on Maritime Transportation, Air Transportation, Parks, Tourism, Higher Education and the Advancement of Women, Youth, and Senior Citizens	Amanda Shelton	
Committee on Infrastructure, Economic Development, Simon Sanchez High School, Disability Services, Self-Determination and Historic Preservation, Housing, Public Accountability, and the Guam Buildup	Roy Anthony Benavente Quinata	
Committee on Federal, Foreign & Regional Affairs, Innovation & Development, Human Resources & Public Libraries	Tina Rose Muña Barnes	
Committee on Emergency Response, Military and Veteran Affairs, Border Safety and Mayors Council	Dwayne San Nicolas	
Committee on Environment, Revenue and Taxation, Labor, Procurement, and Statistics, Research, and Planning	Sabina Flores Perez	
Committee on Health, Land, Justice, and Culture	Therese M. Terlaje	
