= 34th Guam Legislature =

The 34th Guam Legislature was the meeting of the Guam Legislature that convened in Hagatna on January 2, 2017 and ended on January 7, 2019. It succeeded the 33rd Guam Legislature and was succeeded by the 35th Guam Legislature.

Its composition was determined in the 2016 Guamanian legislative election, where the Democratic Party of Guam won a majority of seats in the Guam Legislature. The session took place during the third and fourth years of Republican Governor Eddie Calvo's second term in office.

== Party summary ==
Affiliation	Party (shading indicates majority caucus)			Total	Vacant
Affiliation	Democratic	Independent	Republican	Total	Vacant
End of previous legislature	9	0	6	15	0
Begin (January 2, 2017)	9	0	6	15	0
Latest voting share	60.0%	0.0%	40.0%		
Beginning of the next legislature	10	0	5	15	0

== Leadership ==
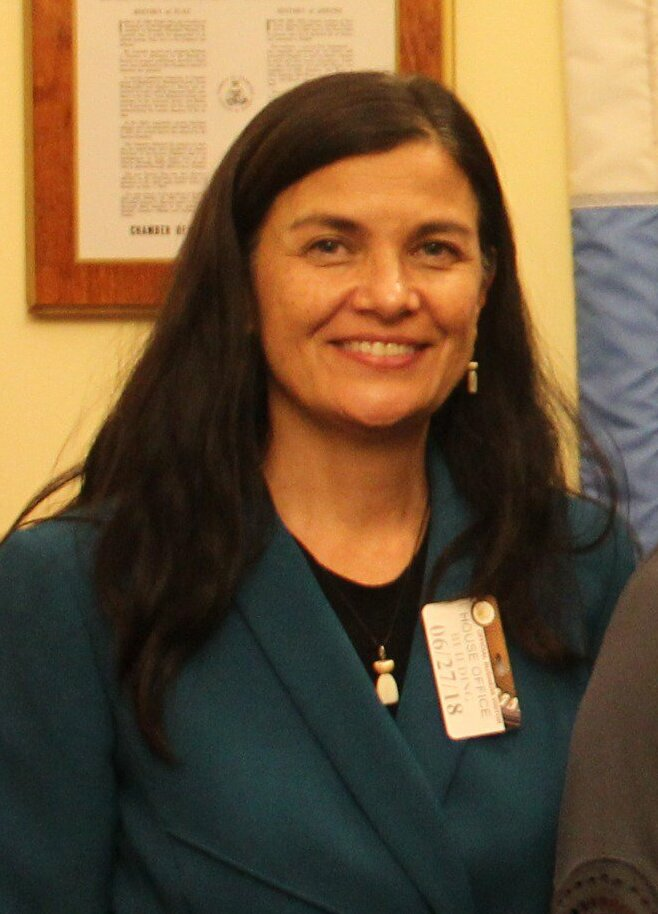
Photo of Vice Speaker Therese Terlaje

=== Legislative ===
- Speaker: Benjamin J.F. Cruz
- Vice Speaker: Therese M. Terlaje
- Legislative Secretary: Regine Biscoe Lee

=== Majority (Democratic) ===
- Majority Leader: Thomas C. Ada
- Assistant Majority Leader: Joe S. San Agustin
- Majority Whip: Telena Cruz Nelson

=== Minority (Republican) ===
- Minority Leader: James V. Espaldon
- Assistant Minority Leader: Thomas A. Morrison
- Minority Whip: Mary Camacho Torres
- Assistant Minority Whip: Louise Borja Muna

== Membership ==
Senator	Party	Assumed office	Residence	Born
Benjamin J.F. Cruz	Democratic	2008	Tumon	1951
Therese M. Terlaje	Democratic	2017	...	1964
Regine Biscoe Lee	Democratic	2017	Tumon	1981
Thomas C. Ada	Democratic	2009	Mangilao	1949
Joe S. San Agustin	Democratic	2017	Yigo	1957
Telena Cruz Nelson	Democratic	2017	Yigo	1980
Michael F.Q. San Nicolas	Democratic	2013	Dededo	1981
Dennis G. Rodriguez, Jr.	Democratic	2011	Dededo	1978
Frank Blas Aguon, Jr.	Democratic	2013	Yona	1966
James V. Espaldon	Republican	2015	Tamuning	1956
Thomas A. Morrison	Republican	2013	Umatac	1975
Mary Camacho Torres	Republican	2015	Santa Rita	1960
Louise Borja Muna	Republican	2017	...	1968
Wil Castro	Republican	2017	Barrigada	1974
Fernando Barcinas Esteves	Republican	2017	...	1985

== Committees ==
Committee	Chair	Vice Chair
Committee on Rules	Regine Biscoe Lee	N/A
Committee on Legislative Operations	Dennis G. Rodriguez, Jr.	N/A
Committee on General Government Operations and Federal, Foreign, & Regional Affairs	Michael F.Q. San Nicolas	Mary Camacho Torres
Committee on Appropriations and Adjudication	Benjamin J.F. Cruz, succeeded by Thomas C. Ada	Thomas C. Ada, succeeded by Frank B. Aguon, Jr.
Committee on Culture and Justice	Therese M. Terlaje	Telena Cruz Nelson
Committee on Innovation and Economic, Work Force, and Youth Development	Regine Biscoe Lee	Benjamin J.F. Cruz
Committee on Education, Finance & Taxation	Joe S. San Agustin	Dennis G. Rodriguez, Jr.
Committee on Housing, Utilities, Public Safety, and Homeland Security	Telena Cruz Nelson	Therese M. Terlaje
Committee on Environment, Land, Agriculture, and Procurement Reform	Thomas C. Ada	James V. Espaldon
Committee on Guam-U.S. Military Buildup, Infrastructure, and Transportation	Frank Blas Aguon, Jr.	Thomas A. Morrison
Committee on Health, Tourism, Military Affairs, and Senior Citizens	Dennis G. Rodriguez, Jr.	Joe S. San Agustin
Committee on Ethics and Standards	Fernando Barcinas Esteves	Regine Biscoe Lee
