= Terlaje =

Terlaje is a surname. Notable people with the surname include:

- Pedo Terlaje (1946–2023), Guamanian politician
- Therese Terlaje (born 1964), Guamanian attorney and politician
