= 36th Guam Legislature =

The 36th Guam Legislature was the meeting of the Guam Legislature that was convened in Hagatna, Guam on January 4, 2021 and ended on January 1, 2023, during the third and fourth years of Lou Leon Guerrero's Governorship.

In the 2020 Guam election, the Democratic Party of Guam retained power with a slight decrease in their number of seats. The party began the session with 8 out of 15 seats, down two from the 10 seat supermajority they enjoyed in the 35th Guam Legislature.

== Party summary ==
Affiliation	Party (shading indicates majority caucus)		Total
Affiliation	Democratic	Republican	Total
End of previous legislature	10	5	15
Begin (January 4, 2021)	8	7	15
Latest voting share	53.3%	46.7%	

== Leadership ==
=== Legislative ===
- Speaker: Therese M. Terlaje
- Vice Speaker: Tina Rose Muña Barnes
- Legislative Secretary: Amanda Shelton

=== Majority (Democratic) ===
- Majority Leader: Telena Cruz Nelson
- Assistant Majority Leader: Amanda Shelton
- Majority Whip: Sabina Perez

=== Minority (Republican) ===
- Minority Leader: James C. Moylan, until March 22, 2021
  - Christopher M. Duenas, from March 22, 2021
- Minority Whip: Frank F. Blas Jr.

== Membership ==
Senator	Party	Assumed office	Residence	Born
Therese M. Terlaje	Democratic	2017	Mangilao	1964
Tina Rose Muña Barnes	Democratic	2019	Mangilao	1962
Amanda L. Shelton	Democratic	2019	Asan-Maina	1990
Telena Cruz Nelson	Democratic	2017	Yigo	1980
Sabina Perez	Democratic	2019	Barrigada	
Joe S. San Agustin	Democratic	2017	Yigo	1957
Clynton Ridgell	Democratic	2019	Talo'fo'fo	1979
Jose "Pedo" Terlaje	Democratic	2019	Yona	
James Moylan	Republican	2019		
Frank F. Blas Jr.	Republican	2021		
Mary Camacho Torres	Republican	2015	Sånta Rita-Sumai	1960
Telo T. Taitague	Republican	2019	Tamuning	
V. Anthony "Tony" Ada	Republican	2021	Sinajana	1967
Joanne M. Brown	Republican	2021		
Christopher M. Dueñas	Republican	2021		

== Committees ==
Committee	Chair	Vice Chair
Committee on Rules	Tina Rose Muña Barnes	Amanda Shelton
Committee on Health, Tourism, Historic Preservation, Land and Justice	Therese M. Terlaje	Sabina Flores Perez
Committee on Economic Development, Agriculture, Maritime Transportation, Power and Energy Utilities, and Emergency Response	Clynton E. Ridgell	Tina Rose Muña Barnes
Committee on Public Safety, Border Safety, Military and Veteran Affairs, Mayors Council, Infrastructure and Public Transit	Jose "Pedo" Terlaje	V Anthony Ada (Military and Veterans' Affairs), Tina Rose Muña Barnes (Mayors' Council of Guam), Frank Blas Jr. (Public Safety), Mary C Torres (Public Transit), Clynton E. Ridgell (Emergency Response)
Committee on Environment, Revenue and Taxation, and Procurement	Sabina E. Perez	Therese M. Terlaje
Committee on Education and Infrastructural Advancement, Border Protection and Maritime Transportation, Guåhan Preservation and Self-Determination, and Federal and Foreign Relations	Telena Cruz Nelson	Amanda Shelton (Higher Education), Therese M.Terlajw (Self-Determination, Federal and Foreign Relations), Mary C. Torres (Border Protection and Maritime Transportation)
Committee on Federal and Foreign Affairs, Telecommunications, Technology, and Labor	Regine Biscoe Lee	Clynton E. Ridgell
Committee on General Government Operations, Appropriations, and Housing	Joe S. San Agustin	Amanda Shelton (General Government Operations Housing), Clynton E. Ridgell (Appropriations)
Committee on Air Transportation, Parks, Tourism, Higher Education, and the Advancement of Women, Youth, and Senior Citizens	Amanda Shelton	Tina Rose Muña Barnes (Air Transportation, Parks, and Tourism), Telena Cruz Nelson (Higher Education), Regine Biscoe Lee (Advancement of Youth), Joe S. San Agustin (Advancement of Senior Citizens)
Committee on Education and Infrastructural Advancement	Telena Cruz Nelson	Amanda Shelton (Education)
Committee on Public Accountability, Human Resources, and the Guam Buildup	Tina Muna Barnes	Amanda Shelton, Mary C. Torres (Regional Affairs and Public Accountability), Frank Blas Jr. (Guam Buildup and Telecommunications)

== See also ==
- 35th Guam Legislature
