= 35th Guam Legislature =

The 35th Guam Legislature was the meeting of the Guam Legislature that was convened in Hagatna, Guam on January 7, 2019 and ended on January 3, 2021, during the first and second years of Lou Leon Guerrero's Governorship. It was succeeded by the 36th Guam Legislature, which began in 2021 and ended in 2023.

In the 2018 Guam election, the Democratic Party of Guam won a supermajority. This is the first supermajority Guam Legislature since the 30th Guam Legislature. This legislature is the first to have a female supermajority.

== Party summary ==
Affiliation	Party (shading indicates majority caucus)		Total
Affiliation	Democratic	Republican	Total
End of previous legislature	9	6	15
Begin (January 3, 2019)	10	5	15
Latest voting share	66.7%	33.3%	

== Leadership ==
=== Legislative ===
- Speaker: Tina Muna Barnes
- Vice Speaker: Telena Cruz Nelson
- Legislative Secretary: Amanda Shelton

=== Majority (Democratic) ===
- Majority Leader: Telena Cruz Nelson
- Assistant Majority Leader: Kelly Marsh Taitano
- Majority Whip: Amanda Shelton
- Assistant Majority Whip: Regine Biscoe Lee

=== Minority (Republican) ===
- Minority Leader: Wil Castro
- Assistant Minority Leader: Louise Borja Muna
- Minority Whip: Telo Taitague
- Assistant Minority Whip: James Moylan

== Membership ==
Senator	Party	Assumed office	Residence	Born
Tina Muna Barnes	Democratic	2019	Mangilao	1962
Telena Cruz Nelson	Democratic	2017	Yigo	1980
Amanda L. Shelton	Democratic	2019	Asan-Maina	1990
Kelly Marsh (Taitano)	Democratic	2019	Asan-Maina	
Regine Biscoe Lee	Democratic	2017	Tumon	1981
Joe S. San Agustin	Democratic	2017	Yigo	1957
Therese M. Terlaje	Democratic	2017	Mangilao	1964
Clynton E. Ridgell	Democratic	2019	Talofofo	1979
Jose "Pedo" Terlaje	Democratic	2019	Yona	
Sabina Perez	Democratic	2019		
Wil Castro	Republican	2017	Barrigada	1974
Louise Borja Muna	Republican	2017	...	1968
Telo T. Taitague	Republican	2019	Tamuning	
James Moylan	Republican	2019		
Mary Camacho Torres	Republican	2015	Santa Rita	1960

== Committees ==
Committee	Chair	Vice Chair
Committee on Rules	Regine Biscoe Lee	Amanda Shelton
Committee on Health, Tourism, Historic Preservation, Land and Justice	Therese M. Terlaje	Sabina Flores Perez
Committee on Economic Development, Agriculture, Maritime Transportation, Power and Energy Utilities, and Emergency Response	Clynton E. Ridgell	Tina Muna Barnes
Committee on Public Safety, Border Safety, Military and Veteran Affairs, Mayors Council, Infrastructure and Public Transit	Jose "Pedo" Terlaje	Tina Muna Barnes (Military and Veterans' Affairs and Mayors' Council of Guam), Telena Cruz Nelson (Public Safety), Joe S. San Agustin (Infrastructure), William M. Castro (Border Security)
Committee on Environment, Revenue and Taxation, and Procurement	Sabina E. Perez	Therese M. Terlaje (Environment), Telena Cruz Nelson (Revenue and Taxation, and Procurement]
Committee on Heritage and the Arts, Parks, Guam Products, Hagatna Revitalization, Self-Determination, and Regional Affairs	Dr. Kelly Marsh Taitano	Tina Muna Barnes, Amanda Shelton (Heritage and the Arts), Jose "Pedo" Terlaje (Self-Determination), Clynton E. Ridgell (Regional Affairs)
Committee on Federal and Foreign Affairs, Telecommunications, Technology, and Labor	Regine Biscoe Lee	Clynton E. Ridgell
Committee on General Government Operations, Appropriations, and Housing	Joe S. San Agustin	Amanda Shelton (General Government Operations Housing), Clynton E. Ridgell (Appropriations)
Committee on Higher Education and the Advancement of Women, Youth, and Senior Citizens	Amanda Shelton	Telena Cruz Nelson (Higher Education), Kelly Marsh Taitano (Advancement of Women), Regine Biscoe Lee (Advancement of Youth), Joe S. San Agustin (Advancement of Senior Citizens)
Committee on Education, Air Transportation, and Statistics, Research, and Planning	Telena Cruz Nelson	Therese M. Terlaje, Amanda Shelton (Education)
Committee on Public Accountability, Human Resources, and the Guam Buildup	Tina Muna Barnes	Kelly Marsh Taitano
