= List of botanical gardens and arboretums in Guam =

This list of botanical gardens and arboretums in Guam is intended to include all significant botanical gardens and arboretums in the United States territory Guam

Name	Image	Affiliation	City
Guam Zoological, Botanical & Marine Gardens ("Guam Zoo")			Tumon
Guam Plant Extinction Prevention Program (GPEPP), rare plant nursery		University of Guam	Mangilao
Dededo Limestone Forest Restoration Project ("Kurason I Sengsong Nature Park") and native plant nursery		Kurason I Sengsong - Guam Native Plant Society	Dededo
Hamamoto Tropical Fruit World		Guahan Sustainable Culture	Yona

== See also ==
- List of botanical gardens and arboretums in the United States
