= 33rd Guam Legislature =

The 33rd Guam Legislature was a meeting of the Guam Legislature. It convened in Hagatna, Guam on January 5, 2015 and ended on January 2, 2017, during the 1st and 2nd years of Eddie Calvo's 2nd Gubernatorial Term.

In the 2014 Guamanian general election, the Democratic Party of Guam won a majority of seats in the Guam Legislature.

== Party summary ==
Affiliation	Party (shading indicates majority caucus)			Total	Vacant
Affiliation	Democratic	Independent	Republican	Total	Vacant
End of previous legislature	9	0	6	15	0
Begin (January 5, 2015)	9	0	6	15	0
Latest voting share	60.0%	0.0%	40.0%		
Beginning of the next legislature	9	0	6	15	0

== Leadership ==
=== Legislative ===
- Speaker: Judith T.P. Won Pat
- Vice Speaker: Benjamin J.F. Cruz
- Legislative Secretary: Tina Muna Barnes

=== Majority (Democratic) ===
- Majority Leader: Rory J. Respicio
- Assistant Majority Leader: Thomas C. Ada
- Majority Whip: Dennis G. Rodriguez, Jr.
- Assistant Majority Whip: Michael F.Q. San Nicolas

=== Minority (Republican) ===
- Minority Leader: V. Anthony "Tony" Ada
- Assistant Minority Leader: Brant McCreadie
- Minority Whip: Mary Camacho Torres
- Assistant Minority Whip: Thomas A. Morrison

== Membership ==
Senator	Party	Assumed office	Residence	Born
Judith T.P. Won Pat	Democratic	2005	Inarajan	1949
Benjamin J.F. Cruz	Democratic	2008	Tumon	1951
Tina Muna Barnes	Democratic	2007	Mangilao	1962
Rory J. Respicio	Democratic	2003	Agana Heights	1973
Thomas C. Ada	Democratic	2009	Mangilao	1949
Dennis G. Rodriguez, Jr.	Democratic	2011	Dededo	1978
Michael F.Q. San Nicolas	Democratic	2013	Dededo	1981
Frank Blas Aguon, Jr.	Democratic	2013	Yona	1966
Nerissa Bretania Underwood	Democratic	2015	Tamuning	1955
V. Anthony "Tony" Ada	Republican	2010		1967
Brant McCreadie	Republican	2015		1971
Mary Camacho Torres	Republican	2015	Santa Rita	1960
Thomas A. Morrison	Republican	2013	Umatac	1975
Frank Blas, Jr.	Republican	2015		1962
James V. Espaldon	Republican	2015	Tamuning	1956

== Committees ==
Committee	Chair	Vice Chair
Committee on Rules, Federal, Foreign & Micronesian Affairs, Human & Natural Resources, Election Reform and Capitol District	Rory J. Respicio	Thomas C. Ada
Committee on Higher Education, Culture, Public Libraries, and Women's Affairs	Judith T. Won Pat, Ed.D.	Nerissa Bretania Underwood, Ph.D.
Committee on Appropriations and Adjudication	Benjamin J.F. Cruz	Frank B. Aguon, Jr.
Committee on Municipal Affairs, Tourism, Housing and Historic Preservation	Tina Muna Barnes	Benjamin J.F. Cruz
Committee on Transportation, Infrastructure, Lands, Border Protection, Veterans' Affairs and Procurement	Thomas C. Ada	Rory J. Respicio
Committee on the Guam U.S. Military Relocation, Public Safety, and Judiciary	Frank B. Aguon, Jr.	Thomas C. Ada
Committee on Health, Economic Development, Homeland Security, and Senior Citizens	Dennis G. Rodriguez, Jr.	V. Anthony "Tony" Ada
Committee on Finance & Taxation, General Government Operations and Youth Development	Michael F.Q. San Nicolas	Mary Camacho Torres
Committee on Early Learning, Juvenile Justice, Public Education and First Generation Initiatives	Nerissa Bretania Underwood, Ph.D.	Judith T. Won Pat, Ed.D.
