= Senator Taitano =

Senator Taitano may refer to:

- Kelly Marsh Taitano (born 1964), Senate of Guam
- Richard Taitano (1921–1997), Senate of Guam
