= Joe S. San Agustin =

Guamanian politician (born 1957)

Joe San Agustin
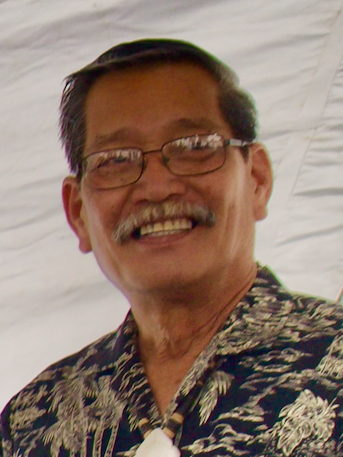
- San Agustin in May 2024

Member of the Guam Legislature
- Incumbent
- Assumed office January 4, 2017

Personal details
- Born: Joe Shimuzu San Agustin; 1957 (age 68–69)
- Party: Democratic
- Relatives: Joe T. San Agustin (father)
- Education: University of Guam (BA)

Joe Shimizu San Agustin (born 1957) is a Guamanian politician. A member of the Democratic Party, he served in the Legislature of Guam since 2017.

== Early life and education ==
His father, Joe T. San Agustin (1930-2011), was a longtime Guamanian politician who served as Speaker of the Guam Legislature. Joe S. San Agustin attended John F. Kennedy High School. He later received a bachelor's degree in criminal justice from the University of Guam.

== Political career ==
San Agustin ran to serve in the Legislature of Guam in the 2016 Guamanian legislative election, and was elected. He was sworn in as a freshman senator for the 34th Guam Legislature in January 2017. He was reelected in the 2018 general election to serve in the 35th Guam Legislature.

In 2020, San Agustin won reelection, with the third highest number of votes cast, and would serve in the 36th Guam Legislature. He was reelected again in the 2022 Guamanian election, coming in fourth place.

== Political views ==
On abortion rights, San Agustin stated that "I am anti-abortion, but I cannot support any measure that does not allow exceptions for victims of rape or incest, or if deemed medically necessary to save a life.". In 2018, San Agustin co-sponsored legislation to introduce a 20-week abortion ban.

== See also ==
- Guam Legislature
- Democratic Party of Guam
