= Guam Adventist Academy =

Location
- 1200 Aguilar Road; Yona, Guam 96915; 13.3751°N 144.7476°E

Information
- Type: Adventist
- Established: 1949
- Grades: K-12
- Affiliation: Seventh-day Adventist Church
- Website: gaasda.org

Guam Adventist Academy (GAA) is a K-12 private school run by the Seventh-day Adventist Church in Guam and the Seventh-day Adventist Guam Micronesia Mission, in Yona, Guam. The school's Windward Hills campus is across the street from the Windward Hills Golf Club.

In 1949, Pastor Dunton founded what would become the GAA in Dededo, with an enrollment of 26 pupils. The second GAA school in Talofofo was opened in 1951.

By 1957, the two schools merged into one K-12 institution, located in Agaña Heights. In July 1963, the institution secured what would become its current location in Windward Hills.

In 2007, the school had about 100 students.

As of 2010, the school combined the high school graduation and the eighth grade promotion exercises into a single ceremony.

== Activities ==
The athletic teams are called the "Angels."

The Angels had a Middle School Basketball team with the two stars being point guard #0(leader in steals and assists)and (#50, leader in points and blocks)would still be very skillful and would have a much better statistical year.

The school has a career day every year.

Electives offered in the school include Japanese, Spanish, Korean, Handbell Choir, woodworking, small engines, anatomy and physiology, and gardening.
