= Therese Terlaje =

Guamanian attorney and politician (born 1964)

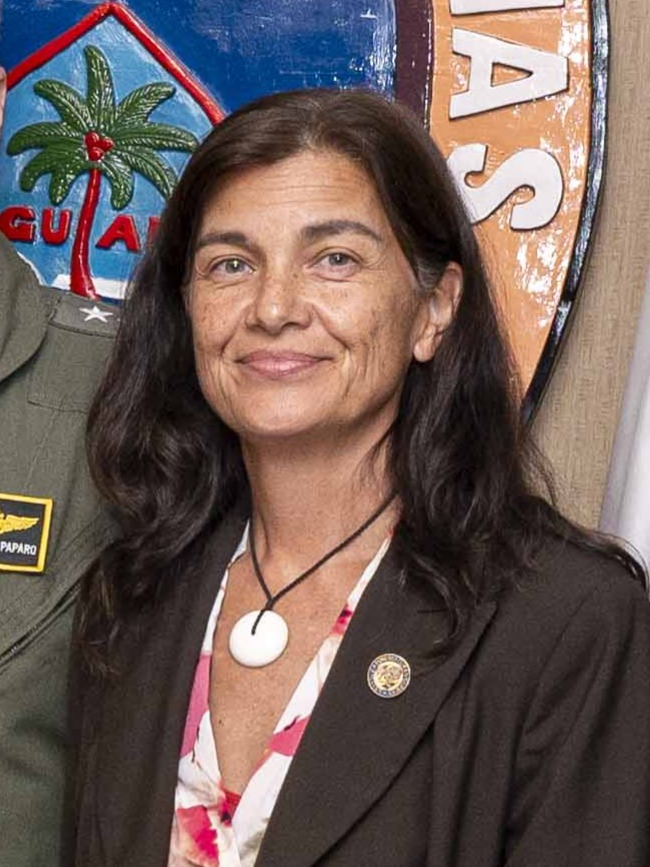
- Terlaje in 2024

Speaker of the Guam Legislature
- In office January 4, 2021 – January 6, 2025
- Preceded by: Tina Rose Muña Barnes
- Succeeded by: Frank F. Blas Jr.
- In office September 13, 2018 – January 7, 2019; Acting
- Preceded by: Benjamin Cruz
- Succeeded by: Tina Rose Muña Barnes

Member of the Guam Legislature
- Incumbent
- Assumed office January 2, 2017

Personal details
- Born: 1964 (age 61–62) Yona, Guam, U.S.
- Party: Democratic
- Children: 3
- Education: Creighton University (BS); University of California, Los Angeles (JD)
- Website: Legislature website Campaign website

Therese M. Terlaje (born 1964) is a Guamanian politician and attorney. A member of the Democratic Party, Terlaje has served as a member of the Legislature of Guam since 2017, and as Speaker of the Guam Legislature from 2021 to 2025.

An attorney by profession, Terlaje was first elected in 2016 to serve in the 34th Guam Legislature, where she was elected Vice Speaker of the Guam Legislature. She has been reelected in every election since, having served in the 35th (2019–2021), 36th (2021–2023), 37th (2023–2025), and 38th (2025-present) sessions of the legislature. Terlaje is running for Governor of Guam.

== Early life and education ==
Therese Maria Terlaje was born in Yona, Guam, one of eleven children born to Eduardo Salas Terlaje (1934-2022) and Shirley Ann Coulter Terlaje (1938–2019). Her mother was a Nebraska-born educator who served as a member of the Territorial Board of Education in 1979. She met Eduardo Terlaje when he was a student in Creighton University in Nebraska.

Her father was an attorney and politician described as a "pioneering Chamoru lawyer who began practicing law locally in 1960", and went on to become a four-term senator and vice speaker in the Guam Legislature.

Terlaje attended the Academy of Our Lady of Guam, an all-girls Catholic school located in Hagåtña, Guam. Terlaje later earned a Bachelor of Science degree in biology from Creighton University in Omaha, Nebraska. She received a Juris Doctor degree from the University of California, Los Angeles School of Law.

== Legal career ==
After graduating from law school, Terlaje became an attorney, where she practiced in the fields of corporate law, juvenile law, family law, and real estate. She was also an assistant professor at the University of Guam in the fields of criminal justice and public administration.

== Political career ==
=== Guam Legislature (2017–present) ===
Terlaje was elected to the Guam Legislature in 2016 and assumed office in 2017. In the Legislature, Terlaje is the chair of the Committee on Health, Tourism, Historic Preservation, Land and Justice. She previously served as the chair of the Committee on Culture and Justice. During the 34th legislative session, Terlaje served as vice speaker.

In 2018, Terlaje won reelection, receiving more votes than any other candidate. In an interview with Truthout after her election victory, Terlaje identified self-determination as a top issue, and indicated support for holding a plebiscite on Guam's political status, In 2020, during the 35th legislative session, Terlaje introduced Bill 335-35, which would have mandated rapid and transparent implementation of COVID-19 relief programs, which was vetoed by Governor Leon Guerrero.

==== Speaker of the Guam Legislature (2021–present) ====
After winning reelection in 2020, was chosen to serve as Speaker of the Guam Legislature in the 36th session, taking office on January 4, 2021. Reelected to the Guam Legislature the 2022 election, Terlaje was once again elected Speaker of the Guam Legislature for the 37th session on January 5, 2023.

=== Political future ===
In 2023, it was reported that Terlaje is a potential candidate for Governor of Guam in the 2026 election to succeed term-limited incumbent Lou Leon Guerrero. According to the Pacific Daily News, media reports have speculated that Terlaje may launch a campaign with Guam senator Chris Barnett as her lieutenant gubernatorial running mate. When asked about the possibility of a candidacy on The Ray Gibson Show, Barnett indicated that Terlaje would lead the ticket with him as her running mate, though did not confirm that the ticket was finalized.

== Elections ==
In April 2026, Senator Terlaje officially announced her bid to be the Democratic gubernatorial primaries along with her running mate, senator Sabina Perez. The Terlaje/Perez ticket defeated 2 other Democratic tickets, the Tenorio/Muña-Barnes ticket, and the San Agustin/San Nicolas ticket, to win the primary election. They were defeated by Vice Speaker Vicente Ada and businessman Edward "EJ" Calvo in the general election.

== Personal life ==
Terlaje has three daughters: Maria, Rita and Arisa Barcinas. One of her brothers, John Terlaje, was nominated to be the eighth judge of the Superior Court of Guam by Governor Leon Guerrero in October 2022.

Political offices
| Preceded by Benjamin Cruz | Speaker of the Guam Legislature; Acting; 2018–2019 | Succeeded by Tina Rose Muña Barnes |
| Preceded by Tina Rose Muña Barnes | Speaker of the Guam Legislature; 2021–2025 | Succeeded by Frank F. Blas Jr. |
Party political offices
| Preceded by Lou Leon Guerrero | Democratic nominee for Governor of Guam; 2026 | Most recent |
