= Clynton Ridgell =

Clynt Ridgell
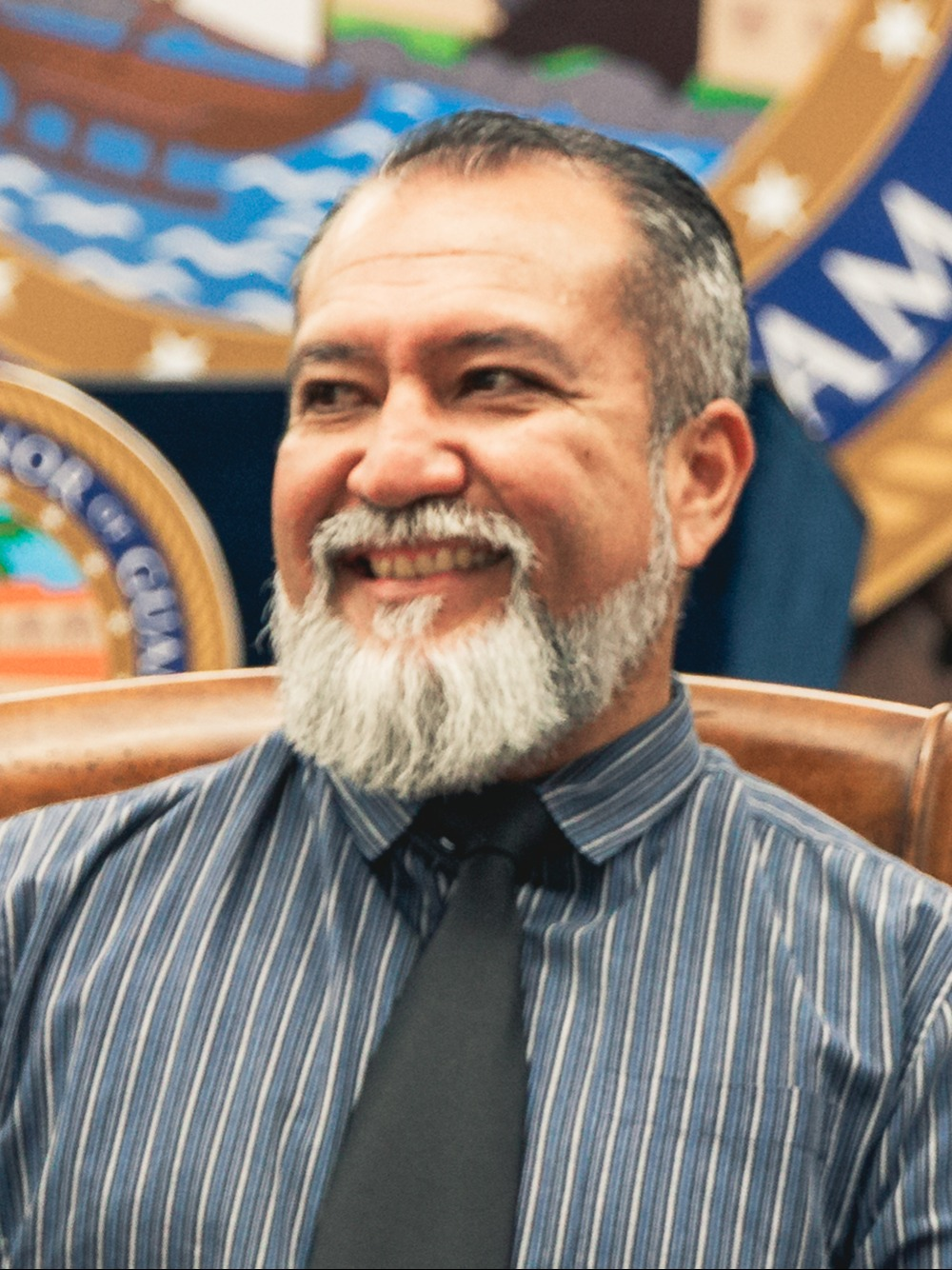

Personal details
- Born: 1978 or 1979 (age 47–48)
- Party: Democratic
- Education: University of Guam

Clynton E. Ridgell is a Guamanian politician. He served as a senator in the Legislature of Guam during the 35th and the 36th legislatures.

As of 2026, He serves as deputy chief of staff to Governor Lou Leon Guerrero.

== Early life and background ==
Clynton E. Ridgell was born in Guam. His mother is of Chuukese ancestry and his father is of European ancestry. He earned a Bachelor of Arts in communications at the University of Guam. He was a news anchor until resigning from that position to run for office.

== Political career ==
He was elected in 2018. During the 36th Legislature, he was the chairman of the Committee on Economic Development, Agriculture, Power and Energy Utilities, and the Arts. He chose not to run for reelection in 2022. He is a candidate for the Legislature in the 2026 election.
