= Yona, Guam =

Coordinates: 13°24′35″N 144°46′24″E

Yona Yoʼña
- Village
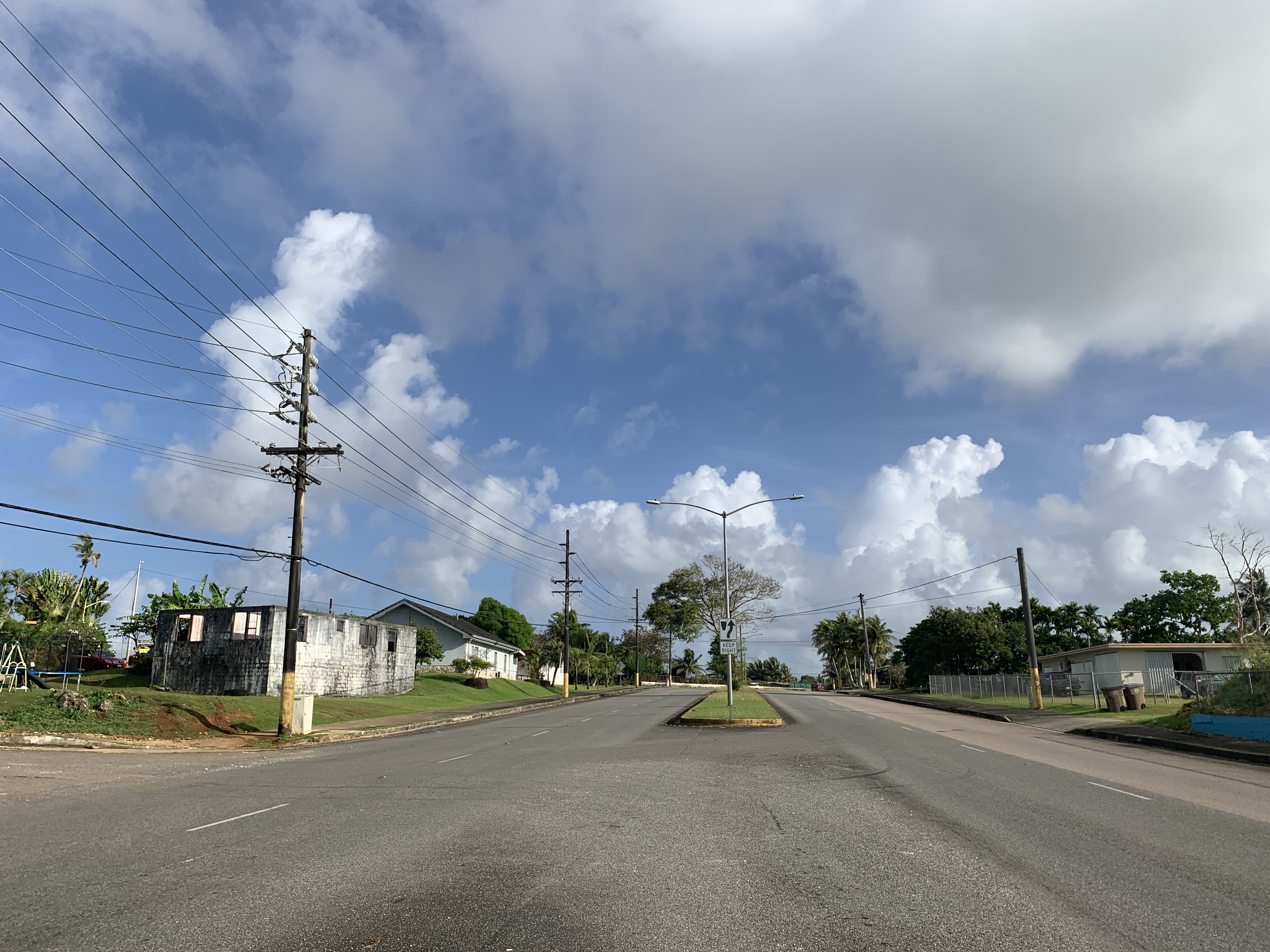

- Location of Yona within the Territory of Guam.
- Country: United States
- Territory: Guam

Government
  - Mayor: Brian "BJ" Terlaje (D)

Area
  - Total: 20 sq mi (52 km^{2})

Population (2020)
  - Total: 6,298
- Time zone: UTC+10 (ChST)

Yona (Chamorro: Yo'ña, pronounced [ˈd͡zoʔɲæ]) is a village in the United States territory of Guam.

== History ==
Historical population
Census	Pop.	Note	%±
1960	2,356		—
1970	2,599		10.3%
1980	4,228		62.7%
1990	5,338		26.3%
2000	6,484		21.5%
2010	6,480		−0.1%
2020	6,298		−2.8%

Yona was historically a farming community but today is mostly residential. During World War II, the Japanese forced the indigenous Chamorros to march from camps in northern Guam to prison camps in Yona shortly before the Americans liberated the island. Japanese tanks in the area near the Segua River serve as reminders of the war.

Today, the LeoPalace Resort is located in the Manenggon Hills. The LeoPalace Resort is also used for association football.

== Geography ==
The village of Yona has an area of 20 square miles (52 km^{2}) and is located on the eastern side of Guam between Pago River and Togcha River. The village center is located above the cliffs between Pago Bay and Ylig Bay. Residential areas of Baza Gardens and Windward Hills are located to the south.

The U.S. Census Bureau recognizes two census-designated places in the municipality: Yona, and Windward Hills.

== Sites of interest ==
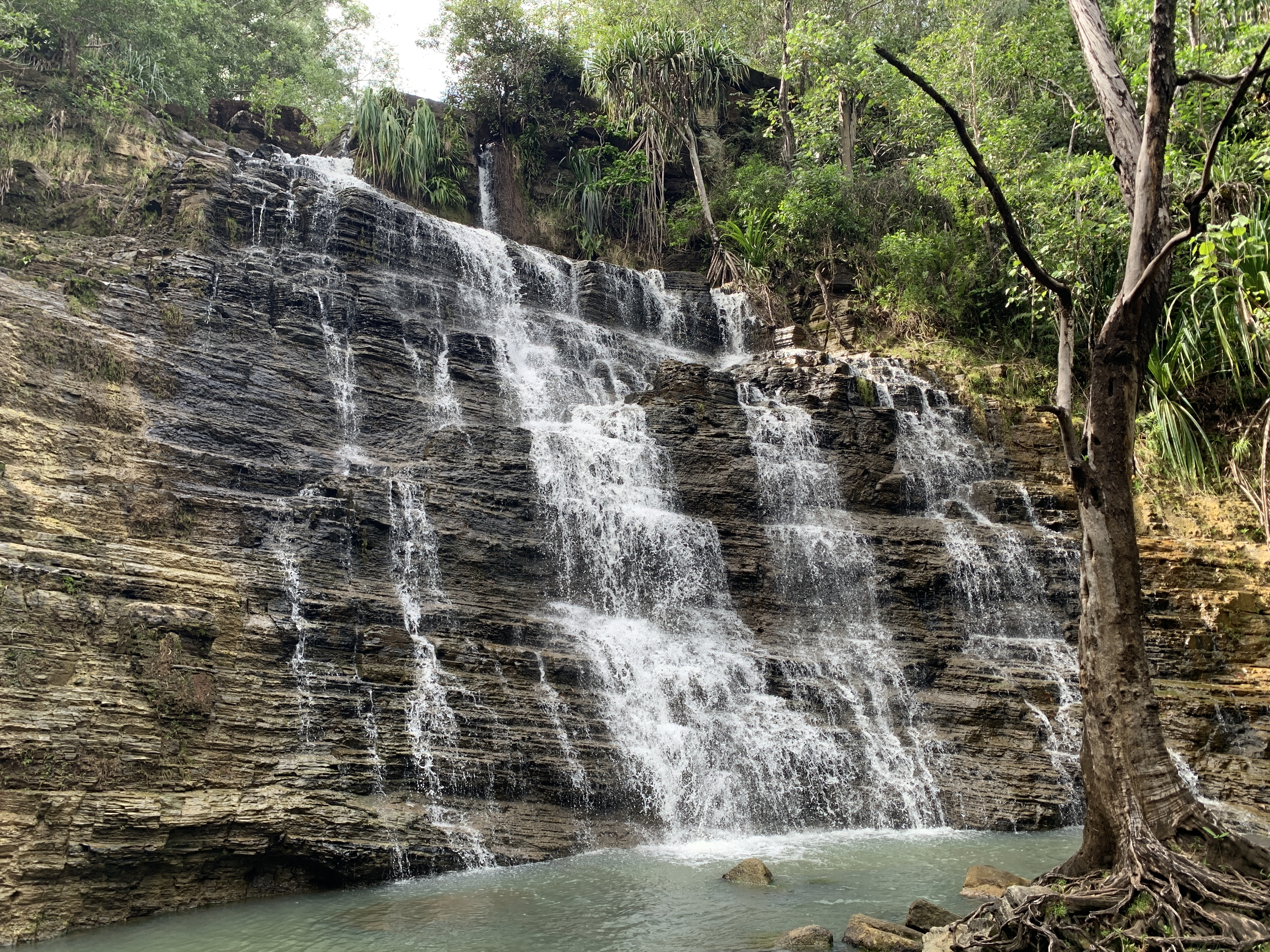
Tarzan Falls

- Sigua Falls
- Tarzan Falls
- Taga'chang Beach Park
- Windward Hills Golf Course
- Country Club of the Pacific Golf Course
- LeoPalace Resort Country Club

== Education ==
=== Primary and secondary schools ===
==== Public schools ====
Guam Public School System serves the island. Manuel U. Lujan Elementary School in Yona and Inarajan Middle School in Inarajan serve Yona. Southern High School in Santa Rita serves the village.

In regards to the Department of Defense Education Activity (DoDEA), Yona is in the school transportation zone for McCool Elementary and McCool Middle School, while Guam High School is the island's sole DoDEA high school.

==== Private schools ====
Guam Adventist Academy is located in Yona. St.Francis Catholic School is located in Yona.

=== Public libraries ===
Guam Public Library System operates the Yona Library at 265 Sister Mary Eucharita Drive.

== Notable people ==
- Frank B. Aguon Jr. - Politician. Senator
- Pedo Terlaje - Politician. Senator
- Therese M. Terlaje - Politician. Senator and Speaker.

== Government ==
Commissioner of Yona
Name	Term begin	Term end
Jose B. Sudo	1952	January 1, 1973

Mayor of Yona
Name	Party	Term begin	Term end
Vicente C. Bernardo	Republican	January 1, 1973	January 1, 2001
Jose T. "Pedo" Terlaje	Democratic	January 1, 2001	January 7, 2013
Ken Joe Ada	Republican	January 7, 2013	January 2, 2017
Jesse M. Blas	Democratic	January 2, 2017	January 30, 2020
Office vacant January 30 – June 12, 2020
William "Bill" A. Quenga	Democratic	June 12, 2020	January 4, 2025
Brian "BJ" Terlaje	Democratic	January 4, 2025	present

== See also ==
- Villages of Guam
