= Joanne M. Brown =

Guamanian politician

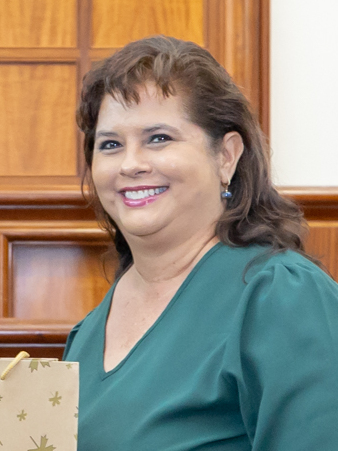
- Brown in 2024

Senator of the Guam Legislature
- In office January 4, 2021 – January 2025
- In office January 2, 1995 – January 1, 2007

Personal details
- Born: Joanne Marie Salas Brown Guam
- Party: Republican
- Parents: James Albert Brown (father); Rosita Salas Brown (mother)
- Education: University of Guam, University of Hawaiʻi at Mānoa.
- Occupation: Politician
- Other names: Joanne Brown, Joanne M. S. Brown, Joanne S. Brown, Joanne M. Salas Brown

Joanne Marie Salas Brown is a Guamanian politician. Brown serves as a Republican senator in the Guam Legislature.

== Early life ==
Brown was born in Guam. Brown's father is James Albert Brown. Brown's mother is Rosita Salas Brown. In 1983, Brown graduated from Notre Dame High School.

== Education ==
In 1987, Brown earned a Bachelor of Science degree in political science from University of Guam. In 1988, Brown earned a Master of Arts degree in political science from University of Hawaiʻi at Mānoa.

== Career ==
In 1989, Brown started her political career as a Staff Assistant for Governor Joseph Franklin Ada.

In March 1991, Brown was appointed as Deputy Administrator for the Guam Environmental Protection Agency.

In November 1994, Brown won the election and became a Republican senator in the Guam Legislature. Brown served her first term on January 2, 1995, in the 23rd Guam Legislature. Brown served her second term in the 24th Guam Legislature. Brown served her third term in the 25th Guam Legislature. Brown served her fourth term in the 26th Guam Legislature. Brown served her fifth term in the 27th Guam Legislature. Brown served her sixth term in the 28th Guam Legislature, until the term's end date on January 1, 2007.

In 1995, Brown became an Adjunct Instructor of Political Science at University of Guam, College of Arts and Sciences, until 2006.

In January 2011, Brown became a Director of Guam Department of Public Works, until 2012.

In December 2012, upon the resignation of Anisia B. Terlaje and planned leave of Mary C. Torres, Brown was named acting general manager of Port Authority of Guam. In 2012, Brown became a General Manager of Port Authority of Guam, until 2018.

On November 3, 2020, Brown a won the election and became a Republican senator in the Guam Legislature. Brown continued another term on January 4, 2021, in the 36th Guam Legislature.

== See also ==
- 2020 Guamanian legislative election
