= Kelly Marsh Taitano =

Guamanian politician

Kelly Marsh-Taitano
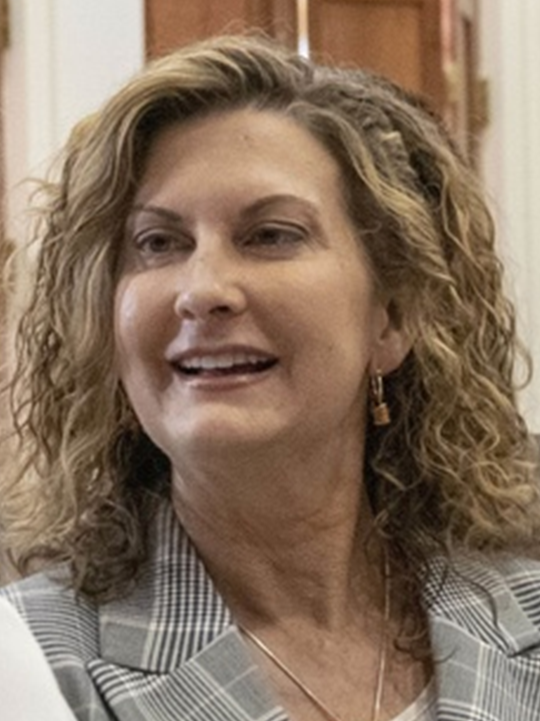
- Marsh-Taitano in January 2019

Assistant Majority Leader of the Guam Legislature
- In office January 7, 2019 – January 4, 2021
- Preceded by: Joe S. San Agustin
- Succeeded by: Amanda Shelton

Senator of the Guam Legislature
- In office January 7, 2019 – January 4, 2021

Personal details
- Born: Kelly G. Marsh; December 24, 1964 (age 61)
- Party: Democratic
- Spouse: Tyrone Taitano
- Children: 3
- Education: Charles Sturt University (PhD); University of Guam (BA, MA)

Kelly Marsh-Taitano (born December 24, 1964) is a Guamanian politician and academic. A member of the Democratic Party, she was a senator in the 35th Guam Legislature. A member of the majority party, Marsh-Taitano was selected as Assistant Majority Leader by her colleagues and chaired the Committee on Heritage and the Arts, Parks, Guam Products, Hagatna Revitalization, Self-Determination, and Regional Affairs.

== Early life and education ==
Kelly Marsh-Taitano was born on December 24, 1964, to her parents Gaynell Bob Marsh and Catherine Ann Becker. She attended the University of Guam in Mangilao, where she received a Bachelor of Arts in History and Anthropology and a Master of Arts in Micronesian Studies. In 2013, she received her Ph.D. in Cultural Heritage Studies from Charles Sturt University in Albury-Wodonga, Australia.

Prior to her election to the Guam Legislature, Kelly Marsh-Taitano worked as an adjunct professor at the University of Guam.

== Political career ==
Marsh-Taitano ran for the incoming 35th Guam Legislature in 2018. She placed 10th in the Democratic primary election in August, advancing to the general election. She placed 11th in the general election in November, earning a seat in the legislature.

Marsh-Taitano sought reelection for the 36th Guam Legislature in 2020. She advanced to the general election by default since Guam's 2020 primary election was canceled due to COVID-19. In the November general election, she placed 16th, narrowing missing the ability to gain a seat in the incoming legislature.

Kelly Marsh-Taitano is running for the seat in the 37th Guam Legislature in 2022. The primary election is set for August 27, 2022. Her placement in the primary will determine if she moves forward to the general election.

== Personal life ==
Marsh-Taitano is married to Tyrone Taitano and resides in Asan, Guam.

== See also ==
- Guam Legislature
- Democratic Party of Guam

Party political offices
Preceded by Joe S. San Agustin	Assistant Majority Leader of the Guam Legislature; 2019–2021	Succeeded by Amanda Shelton
