= Sabina Perez =

Guamanian educator and politician

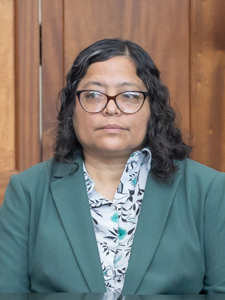

Member of the Guam Legislature
- Incumbent
- Assumed office January 7, 2019

Personal details
- Born: Sabina Eileen Flores Perez
- Party: Democratic
- Education: University of Washington (BS); University of Guam (MA)

Sabina Eileen Flores Perez is a Guamanian educator and politician. Perez serves as a Democratic senator in the Guam Legislature.

== Early life ==
Perez is an indigenous CHamoru of Guåhan. Perez graduated from Academy of Our Lady of Guam, an all-girls Catholic high school.

== Education ==
Perez earned a Bachelor of Science degree in Medical Technology from University of Washington. Perez earned a Master of Arts degree in Teaching from University of Guam.

== Career ==
Perez is a former diabetes researcher at University of California, San Francisco. Perez is a former sales and service representative of Mettler-Toledo Sales.

Perez is a former teacher at Simon Sanchez High School in Yigo, Guam.

On November 6, 2018, Perez won election as a Democratic senator in the Guam Legislature. Perez began her term on January 7, 2019, in the 35th Guam Legislature.

On November 2, 2020, as an incumbent, Perez won election and continued serving as a senator in the 36th Guam Legislature.

Perez won reelection to the 37th Guam Legislature in the 2022 Guam election with 12,330 votes.

In the 2024 Guam election Perez was reelected with 12,077 votes to the 38th Guam Legislature.

Perez also ran as a candidate for Lieutenant Governor of Guam in the 2026 gubernatorial election as the running mate of senator and former speaker Therese Terlaje. They won the Democratic primary in August. They were defeated by Vice Speaker Vicente Ada and businessman Edward "EJ" Calvo in the general election.

== Personal life ==
Perez lives in Barrigada, Guam.

Party political offices
Preceded by Josh Tenorio	Democratic nominee for Lieutenant Governor of Guam; 2026	Most recent
