= Tom Ada =

American politician

Majority Leader of the Guam Legislature
- In office January 2, 2017 – January 7, 2019
- Preceded by: Rory Respicio
- Succeeded by: Telena Nelson

Member of the Guam Legislature
- In office January 5, 2009 – January 7, 2019
- In office January 8, 2001 – January 6, 2003
- In office January 4, 1993 – January 4, 1999

Personal details
- Born: Thomas Castro Ada; May 21, 1949 (age 75); Agana, Guam
- Political party: Democratic
- Spouse: Josephine José (m. 1971)
- Children: 2
- Education: University of Dayton (BA); Indiana University, Bloomington (MPA); University of Guam (MBA)

Thomas Castro Ada (born May 21, 1949) is a former Democratic politician in Guam. Ada served as Majority Leader of the 34th Guam Legislature and Senator in the Guam Legislature for 10 terms.

== Guam Legislature ==
=== Elections ===
Election Year	Guam Legislature	Primary Placement	General Placement	Result
1992	22nd Guam Legislature	No primary election	1	Elected
1994	23rd Guam Legislature	1	1	Elected
1996	24th Guam Legislature	1	1	Not elected
2000	26th Guam Legislature	No primary election	6	Elected
2008	30th Guam Legislature	4	5	Elected
2010	31st Guam Legislature	4	1	Elected
2012	32nd Guam Legislature	3	3	Elected
2014	33rd Guam Legislature	4	6	Elected
2016	34th Guam Legislature	7	13	Elected

=== Leadership positions ===
Guam Legislature	Years	Position
30th Guam Legislature	2009-2011	Majority Whip
32nd Guam Legislature	2013-2015	Assistant Majority Leader
33rd Guam Legislature	2015-2017	Assistant Majority Leader
34th Guam Legislature	2017-2019	Majority Leader

=== Leadership positions ===
Guam Legislature	Years	Committees Chaired
30th Guam Legislature	2009-2011	Committee on Utilities, Transportation, Public Works & Veterans Affairs
31st Guam Legislature	2011-2013	Committee on Utilities, Transportation, Public Works & Veterans Affairs
32nd Guam Legislature	2013-2015	Committee on Public Safety, Infrastructure & Maritime Transportation
33rd Guam Legislature	2015-2017	Committee on Transportation, Infrastructure, Lands, Border Protection, Veterans' Affairs and Procurement
34th Guam Legislature	2017-2019	Committee on Environment, Land, Agriculture, and Procurement Reform

== 1998 gubernatorial campaign ==
In 1998, Ada teamed up with Senator Lourdes A. Leon Guerrero to run for Governor of Guam, as the "Tom and Lou" Team. Incumbent Governor Carl T.C. Gutierrez and incumbent Lieutenant Governor Madeleine Z. Bordallo were seeking reelection and were challenged by "Tom and Lou" and the team of Angel L.G. Santos and Jose T. "Pedo" Terlaje under the "HITA" slogan. The team of Gutierrez-Bordallo defeated both primary challengers with 16,838 votes, while "Tom and Lou" had 9,788 votes and the HITA team had 6,295 votes.

Party political offices
Preceded by Madeleine Bordallo	Democratic nominee for Lieutenant Governor of Guam; 2002	Succeeded by Frank Aguon
Legislature of Guam
Preceded by Rory Respicio	Majority Leader of the Guam Legislature; 2017–2019	Succeeded by Telena Nelson
