= Louise Borja Muna =

Guamanian singer, radio host, and politician

Senator of the Guam Legislature
- In office January 9, 2017 – January 4, 2021

Personal details
- Born: Guam
- Party: Republican
- Children: 2
- Parents: David Rapolla Borja (father); Gloria Leddy Wusstig Borja (mother)
- Occupation: Singer, Radio host, Politician
- Other names: Louise B. Muna, Louise Muna

Louise Borja Muna is a Guamanian singer, radio host, and politician. Muna served as a Republican senator in the Guam Legislature from 2017 to 2021.

== Early life ==
Muna's father was David Rapolla Borja. Muna's mother is Gloria Leddy Wusstig Borja.

== Career ==
Muna is a former radio host and a former Program Director for KGUM-FM 105.1 The Kat FM.

Muna is a singer with Radiants, a family band in Guam. Muna is also a certified fitness instructor.

In 2016, Muna was a staff member at the Office of Lt. Governor Ray Tenorio.

On November 8, 2016, Muna won the election and became a Republican senator in the Guam Legislature. Muna began her term on January 9, 2017, in the 34th Guam Legislature. Muna also served as Assistant Minority Whip.

On November 6, 2018, as an incumbent, Muna won the election and continued serving her second term as a senator in the 35th Guam Legislature. Muna also served as an Assistant Minority Leader.

In July 2020, Muna announced that she will not seek another term as a senator in the Guam Legislature.

== Personal life ==
Muna has two children. Muna and her family live in Dededo, Guam.
