= Tommy Morrison (politician) =

Guamanian politician

Minority Whip in the 32nd Guam Legislature
- In office January 6, 2013 – January 5, 2015
- Preceded by: V. Anthony Ada
- Succeeded by: Mary Camacho Torres

Senator of the Guam Legislature
- In office January 7, 2013 – January 7, 2019

Personal details
- Born: Thomas Aaron Morrison; April 5, 1975 (age 51) Umatac, Guam
- Party: Republican
- Spouse: Stephanie Campos
- Children: 3
- Education: University of Guam

Thomas Aaron Morrison (born April 5, 1975) is a Guamanian politician. He served in the Legislature of Guam as a Republican for three terms after first being elected in 2012.

Morrison is a graduate of Oceanview High School and the University of Guam. His wife, Stephanie Campos, is an elementary school teacher for the Guam Department of Education. They had three children are Gage, Jewel and Thomas Aaron II.

In January 2018, Morrison was reported to be one the administrators of a Facebook group called "USI Tech Guam". USI Tech, which was suspected of being a ponzi scheme, described him as an "independent promoter" on its website. He confirmed his affiliation with the company, claiming he was only a customer rather than a promoter.

In April 2018, Morrison announced that he would not seek re-election.
