= Mary Camacho Torres =

Guamanian politician

Mary Torres

Member of the Guam Legislature
- In office January 5, 2015 – January 1, 2023

Personal details
- Born: Mary Camacho Tamuning, Guam, U.S.
- Party: Republican
- Spouse: Robert Torres
- Children: 3
- Relatives: Carlos Camacho (father); Lourdes Perez Camacho (mother); Felix Camacho (brother)
- Education: Tufts University (BA)

Mary Camacho Torres is a Guamanian politician. Torres served as a Republican senator in the Guam Legislature until 2023.

== Early life ==
Torres was born in Tamuning, Guam. Torres' father was Carlos Garcia Camacho (1924-1979), a dentist and the first elected governor of Guam. Torres' mother is Lourdes Perez Camacho, former First Lady of Guam. Torres graduated from Academy of Our Lady of Guam, an all-girls Catholic high school.

== Education ==
Torres earned a Bachelor of Arts degree from Tufts University in Massachusetts.

== Career ==
In February 2012, Torres was appointed as the General Manager of the Port Authority of Guam.

On November 4, 2014, Torres won the election and became a Republican senator in the Guam Legislature. Torres began her term on January 5, 2015 in the 33rd Guam Legislature. Torres also served as the Minority Whip.

On November 8, 2016, as an incumbent, Torres won the election and continued serving as a senator in the 34th Guam Legislature.

On November 5, 2018, as an incumbent, Torres won the election and continued serving as a senator in the 35th Guam Legislature.

On November 2, 2020, as an incumbent, Torres won the election and continued serving as a senator in the 36th Guam Legislature.

== Post-Guam Legislature ==
In November 2025, Torres entered the political scene and publicly announced her run to become Guam's next congressional delegate in 2026. She will be primary challenger to current delegate James Moylan.

== Personal life ==
Torres' husband is Robert Torres, a Justice of the Guam Supreme Court. They have three children. Torres and her family live in Sånta Rita-Sumai, Guam.
