= Regine Biscoe Lee =

Guamanian politician

Régine Lee

Chair of the Guam Democratic Party
- In office November 7, 2017 – October 24, 2019
- Preceded by: Kin Perez
- Succeeded by: Judith Won Pat

Senator of the Guam Legislature
- In office January 2, 2017 – January 4, 2021

Personal details
- Born: Regine Biscoe Barrigada, Guam, US
- Party: Democratic
- Spouse: Andrew "Andy" Lee
- Children: 2
- Education: University of Washington, Seattle (BA)

Regine Biscoe Lee (born December 1981) also known as Regine Lee, is an Asian and Pacific Islander community leader and currently serves as the president and CEO of the Guam Visitors Bureau. Lee is a Guamanian politician with the Democratic Party of Guam and formerly served as senator in the 34th and 35th Guam Legislature. A member of the majority party, Lee was selected as the chair of the Committee on Rules. Senator Lee also chairs the Committee on Federal and Foreign Affairs, Telecommunications, Technology and Labor. In her first term as senator in the 34th Guam Legislature, Senator Lee served as Legislative Secretary and Chair of the Committee on Innovation and Economic, Workforce, and Youth Development.

On June 24, 2020, Lee announced that she would not seek re-election.

== Biography ==
Lee, born in December 1981, is the daughter of Captain Michael and Rosita Aguilo Mahony and Roland Calvo Biscoe. Her grandparents are Marcelo and Maria Calvo Biscoe and Dominador and Isabel Crisostomo Aguilo.

Lee attended high school at the Academy of Our Lady of Guam and subsequently earned her undergraduate degree from the University of Washington. She served as a Policy Advisor to Congresswoman Madeleine Z. Bordallo and Chief of Staff of Senator Tina Muna Barnes before returning to the private sector in 2013, working for Ruder Integrated Marketing Services (RiMS) until 2015.

In 2009, the Filipina Women's Network named Lee as one of the "100 Most Influential Women in the U.S." The Filipina Ladies Association of Guam awarded Lee a Sampaguita Award in 2011. In 2012, 2016, 2020 & 2024 she was elected as a delegate for Guam to the Democratic National Conventions. The Guam Chamber of Commerce named Lee the 2014 Reina A. Leddy Young Professional of the Year.

In 2019, the Obama Foundation selected Lee for the inaugural cohort of Obama Leaders: Asia Pacific, a one-year leadership development and community engagement program that seeks to inspire, empower, and connect emerging leaders from across the Asia-Pacific region. [].

She is currently married to Andrew Lee, has two daughters (Mia and Nina) and resides in Tamuning, Guam.

== Entry into public life ==
In 2016, Lee ran for island-wide office as senator in the 34th Guam Legislature with the slogan, "Strong Families. Strong Guam." In the general election, Lee placed 4th among non-incumbents and 8th overall with 14,864 votes. On January 2, 2017, Lee was inaugurated as senator in the 34th Guam Legislature.

== Other positions ==
Lee has served as Chairwoman of Sanctuary, Incorporated of Guam, Vice President of Soroptomist International of Guam, Vice President of the Guam Women's Club, Board Secretary of the Guam Women's Chamber of Commerce, steering committee co-chair for the Guam Green Growth initiative, a founding board member of Asian American Action Fund - YP and as a member of Guam Cancer Care, Guam Young Professionals, Guam Girl Scouts, and Micronesian Conservation Coalition.

== See also ==
- Guam Legislature
- Democratic Party of Guam

Party political offices
Preceded by Kin Perez	Chair of the Guam Democratic Party; 2017–2019	Succeeded by Judith Won Pat
