= Pedo Terlaje =

Guamanian politician (1946–2023)

Member of the Guam Legislature
- In office January 7, 2019 – January 1, 2023

Mayor of Yona, Guam
- In office January 1, 2001 – January 7, 2013
- Preceded by: Vicente C. Bernardo
- Succeeded by: Ken Joe M. Ada

Personal details
- Born: Jose Toves Terlaje; September 23, 1946 Yona, Guam
- Died: January 30, 2023 (aged 76)
- Political party: Democratic
- Education: George Washington Senior High School; University of Guam (AA, Police Science; BA, Business and Public Administration)

Jose Toves "Pedo" Terlaje (September 23, 1946 – January 30, 2023) was a Guamanian politician. Terlaje served as a senator in the Guam Legislature and Chairperson of the Committee on Public Safety, Border Safety, Military and Veteran Affairs, Mayors Council, Infrastructure and Public Transit.

== Early life and education ==
Jose Toves "Pedo" Terlaje was born in Yona, Guam, on September 23, 1946.

Terlaje graduated from George Washington Senior High School in 1967. He earned an Associate of Arts in Political Science and subsequently a Bachelor of Arts in Business and Public Administration from the University of Guam in 1979.

== Political career ==
=== Santos-Terlaje's HITA Campaign ===
In 1998, incumbent Governor Carl T.C. Gutierrez and Lieutenant Governor Madeleine Z. Bordallo had two Democratic primary election challenges for Governor and Lieutenant Governor of Guam. Pedo Terlaje was chosen as the running mate of Senator Angel L.G. Santos under the slogan Honesty, Integrity, Trust and Accountability (HITA), and Senator Thomas C. Ada ran with Senator Lourdes A. Leon Guerrero. The "HITA" ticket placed 3rd in the Democratic gubernatorial primary on September 5, 1998 with 19% of the Democratic primary votes.

=== Mayor of Yona ===
Terlaje was first elected to serve as Mayor of Yona, Guam, in the 2000 general election. He was reelected to two more terms in 2004 and 2008, respectively. His tenure as Mayor was from 2001 to 2013.

=== Guam Legislature ===
==== Elections ====
Terlaje ran for the 29th Guam Legislature in 2006. He placed 7th in the Democratic primary election in August, advancing to the general election. He placed 23rd in the general election in November and did not earn a seat in the legislature.

Terlaje ran for the 35th Guam Legislature in 2018. He placed 11th in the Democratic primary election in August, advancing to the general election. He placed 15th in the general election in November, earning a seat in the legislature.

=== Leadership roles ===
- 35th Guam Legislature - Committee on Public Safety, Border Safety, Military and Veteran Affairs, Mayors Council, Infrastructure and Public Transit

== Personal life and death ==
Terlaje died on January 30, 2023, at the age of 76.

Political offices
| Preceded by Vicente C. Bernardo | Mayor of Yoña; 2001–2013 | Succeeded by Ken Joe Ada |
