= Telena Cruz Nelson =

Guamanian politician

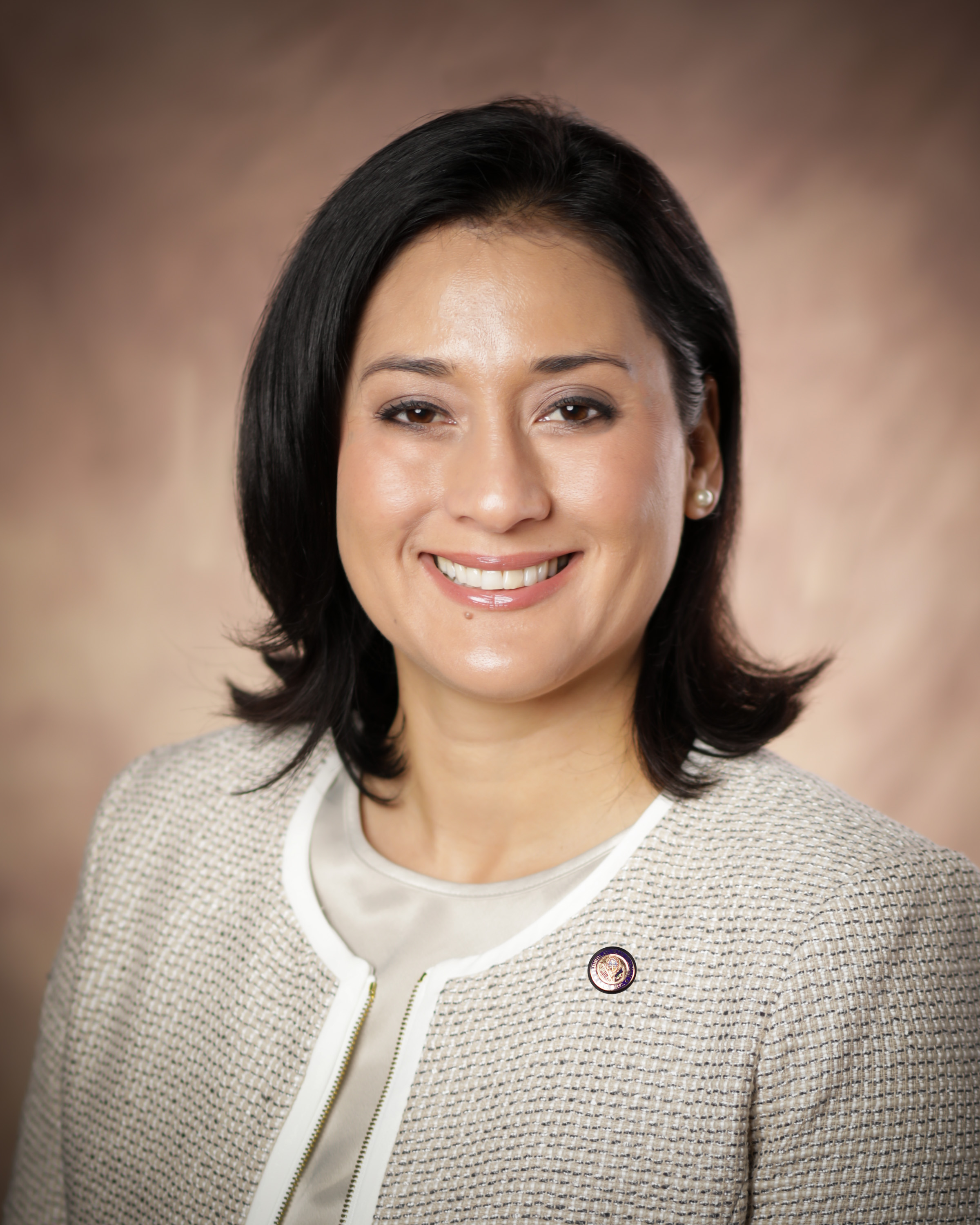

Majority Leader of the Guam Legislature
- In office January 7, 2019 – January 2, 2023
- Preceded by: Tom Ada
- Succeeded by: Rory Respicio

Member of the Guam Legislature
- Incumbent
- Assumed office January 2, 2017

Personal details
- Born: Telena Monique Cruz Nelson; September 25, 1980 (age 45) Portland, Oregon, U.S.
- Party: Democratic
- Relatives: Ted S. Nelson (grandfather)
- Education: University of Guam (BA, MPA)

Telena Monique Cruz Nelson (born September 25, 1980) also known as Telena Nelson, was a Democratic senator in the 36th Guam Legislature. A member of the majority party, Nelson was selected by her colleagues to serve as Majority Leader and chairs the Committee on Education and Infrastructural Advancement, Border Protection and Maritime Transportation, Guåhan Preservation and Self-Determination, and Federal and Foreign Relations. In the 35th Guam Legislature Nelson was elected as the Vice Speaker and Majority Leader and chaired the Committee on Education, Air Transportation, and Statics Research and Planning, and in the 34th Guam Legislature Nelson was the Majority Whip and chaired the Committee on Housing, Utilities, Public Safety, and Homeland Security.

== Early life and education ==
Telena Cruz Nelson was born on September 25, 1980, in Portland, Oregon, the first of five children. She is the daughter of Theodore Dwight Borja Nelson and Stephanie Cruz Nelson both natives of Guam. Her paternal grandparents are Theodore Sgambelluri Nelson, who served as Vice Speaker of the Guam Legislature, and Gloria Camacho Borja Nelson. Her maternal grandparents are Jose Quitugua Cruz and Asuncion "Connie" Lazaro Cruz.

She was raised in a Roman Catholic family. Her maternal grandmother Connie was instrumental in the pilgrimage that brought the Santa Maria Kamalen-Our Lady of Camarin to the Basilica of the National Shrine of the Immaculate Conception in Washington, D.C. She and her maternal grandmother are lectors at their Catholic Church.

She attended Simon Sanchez High School in Guam. She graduated from the University of Guam with a Bachelor of Arts degree in anthropology, and a master's degree in public administration, and is an ICMP Certified Manager. Nelson is a Major in the Guam Army National Guard. In 2001, she enlisted as a Combat Medic. In 2007, she entered and completed Officer Candidate School to be commissioned as an Officer in the Guam Army National Guard.

== Entry into public life ==
In 2016, Senator Nelson was elected to the Guam Legislature with the 5th highest vote count, receiving 16,922 votes in the General Election which took place on November 8, 2016. She was the second-highest vote count amongst non-incumbents in the 2016 election.

She served in a combat zone in Afghanistan and deployed as a lone soldier from the Guam company from 2010-2011. She is also a Captain in the Guam Army National Guard.

== 36th Guam Legislature ==
36th Guam Legislature Committees:

Chairperson: Committee on Education and Infrastructural Advancement, Border Protection and Maritime Transportation, Guåhan Preservation and Self-Determination, and Federal and Foreign Relations

Vice-Chairperson: Committee on Justice

Vice-Chairperson: Committee on Higher Education and the Advancement of Women and Youth

Member: Committee on Rules, Committee on Public Accountability, Human Resources, The Guam Buildup, Hagatna Revitalization, Regional Affairs, Public Libraries, Telecommunications, and Technology

Member: Committee on Environment, Revenue and Taxation, Labor, Procurement, and Statistics, Research, and Planning

== 35th Guam Legislature ==
35th Guam Legislature Committees:

Chairperson: Committee on Education, Air Transportation, and Statistics, Research, and Planning

Vice-Chairperson: Committee on Public Safety

Vice-Chairperson: Committee on Revenue and Taxation, and Procurement

Vice-Chairperson: Committee on Higher Education

Member: Committee on Health, Tourism, Historic Preservation, Land and justice

Member: Committee on public Accountability, Human Resources, and the Guam Buildup

35th Guam Legislature Public Laws:

Bill No. 332-35 (COR) As substituted; and amended on the floor now P.L. No. 35-83

Bill No. 332-35 (COR) as substituted; and amended on the floor now P.L. No. 35-83

Bill No. 170-35 (COR) A mwnsws on the floor now P.L. No. 35-79

Bill No. 232-35 (COR) as amended by the Committee on Education, Air Transportation, and Statistics, research, and planning; and further amended on the floor now P.L. No. 35‐77

Bill No. 196-35(LS) as amended by the Committee on Education, Air Transportation, and Statistics, Research, and Planning; and further amended on the floor now P.L. No. 35-76

Bill No. 102-35 (LS) as amended by the Committee on Health, Tourism, Historic Preservation, Land and Justice; and further amended on the floor now P.L. No. 35-68

Bill No. 107-35 (LS) as amended on the floor now P.L. No. 35-30

Bill No. 106-36 (LS) Committee on Education, Air Transportation, and Statistics, Research and Planning; and further amended on the floor now P.L. No. 35-29

Bill No. 44-35 (COR) as amended on the floor now P.L. No. 35-17

Bill No. 24-35 (COR) now P.L. No. 35-8

Bill No. 23-35 (COR) now P.L. No. 35-3

== 34th Guam Legislature ==
Chairperson: Committee on Housing, Utilities, Public Safety, and Homeland Security

Vice-Chairperson: Committee on Rules

Vice-Chairperson: Committee on Culture and Justice

Member: Committee on General Government Operations and Federal, Foreign, & Regional Affairs

Member: Committee on Innovation and Economic, Work Force, and Youth Development.

34th Guam Legislature Public Laws:

Bill No. 139-34 (COR) As amended in the Committee of the Whole now P.L. No. 34-69

Bill No. 165-34 (LS) now P.L. No. 34-49

Bill No 26-34 (COR) As corrected by the Prime Sponsor now P.L. No. 34-20

Bill No. 50-34 (COR) now P.L. No. 34‐15

Bill No. 26-34 (COR) now P.L. No. AMEND SECTION 3 OF PUBLIC LAW 33-104 AND SECTION 2 OF PUBLIC LAW 33-176

Bill No. 50-34 (COR) lapses into public law.

== Personal life ==
Nelson has civilian experience as an educator in the Guam Department of Education. Coming from a background of educators- her parents, both grandmothers, aunts, siblings, and cousins- her calling was clear to help educate younger generations.

Her family comes from a lineage of farmers and ranchers that have produced their own food and agricultural products for means of living and reselling. Her great-great-grandfather Peter Nelson was a botanist and discovered a large tree from the Serianthes family which they named after him. The Seraithes Nelsonii is known as the S. Nelsonii or hayun lagu. It was named critically endangered in 1998.

She has helped the community by holding multiple teaching positions over the span of several years. Nelson has worked as a Science and Physical Education Teacher and has served as Opportunity Room and Secondary Teacher positions. Through these positions, she has enriched her students’ curriculum to national and state standards, as well as promote physical fitness in the lives of Guam’s youth.

== Military service (2001–present) ==
In the years to follow, she would further serve her country and island by joining the Guam Army National Guard by holding the position of Combat Medic where she would administer emergency medical treatment to battlefield casualties, assist with outpatient and inpatient care and treatment, as well as drawing and preparing blood samples for laboratory analysis up until August 2007. From there she has held the positions of Officer in Charge of Headquarters for the 105th Troop Command Headquarters, Company Commander for the 1671st Signal Network Support Detachment, S6 Signal Officer for the 1225th Combat Sustainment Support Battalion, Afghanistan, Training Officer for HQ 105th Troop Command, Chief Plans and Operations Officer (CND-Team Chief), Company Commander for the 721st Signal Company, 105th Troop Command, Guam Army National Guard, and the Computer Network Defense Team Chief 721st Signal Company, 105th Troop Command, Guam Army National Guard.

== Awards and honors ==
Bronze Star Medal

Army Commendation Medal

Army Achievement Medal

Afghanistan Campaign Medal

NATO Medal

Armed Forces Reserve Medal w/ M-Device

Guam Commendation Medal

German Proficiency Badge (Foreign Award)

Awarded The Adjutant General Star Note for Exceptional Performance during Annual Training 2015

Awarded The Adjutant General Star Note for Marksmanship

Awarded The Adjutant General Star Note for Exceptional Physical Fitness

Legislature of Guam
Preceded by Tom Ada	Majority Leader of the Guam Legislature; 2019–2023	Succeeded by Rory Respicio
