= Amanda Shelton =

American politician (born 1990)

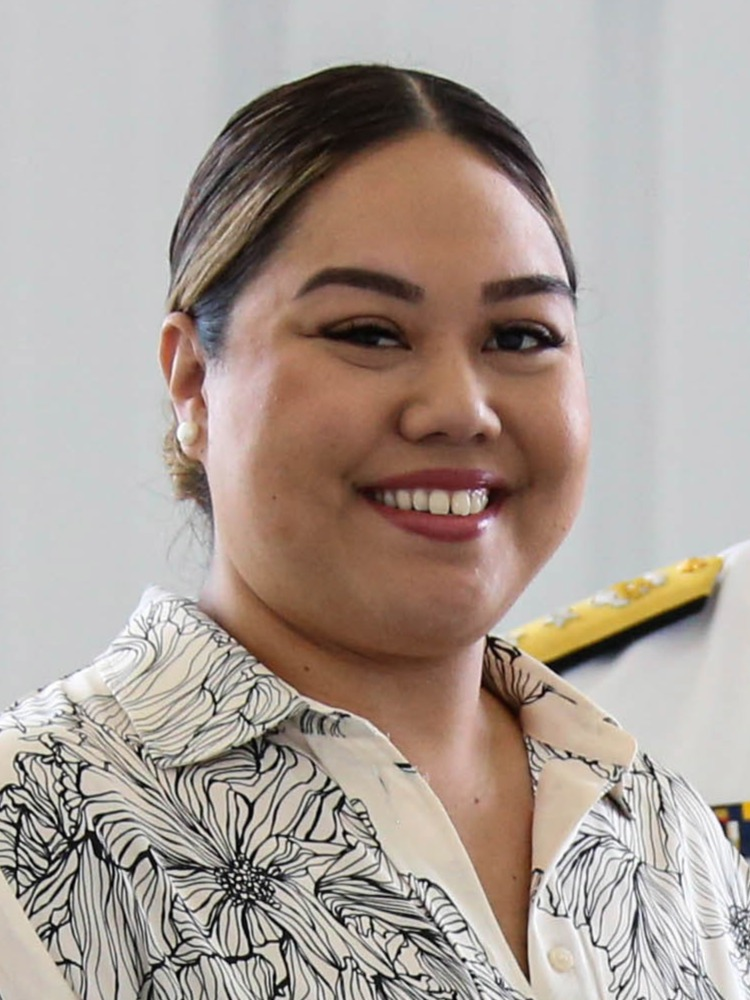
- Shelton in 2022

Member of the Guam Legislature
- Incumbent
- Assumed office January 7, 2019

Personal details
- Born: Amanda Lee Shelton; May 5, 1990 (age 36)
- Party: Democratic
- Education: University of Guam (BA, MPA)

Amanda Lee Shelton (born May 5, 1990) is a Guamanian politician. A member of the Democratic Party of Guam, she currently serves as a senator in the Guam Legislature.

Shelton was chosen by her colleagues to serve as Legislative Secretary and Majority Whip and Chairperson of the Committee on Higher Education and the Advancement of Women, Youth, and Senior Citizens.

== Family, early life, and education ==
Amanda L. Shelton, from the village of Asan-Maina, is the daughter of the late former Senator Austin "Sonny" Shelton and Gracialla Shinohara Shelton. She is the granddaughter of late pioneering nurse Amanda Guzman Shelton and the late Austin James Shelton. Her grandmother Amanda Guzman Shelton was chief native nurse during the Japanese occupation of Guam in World War II, when Japanese forces took over control of the hospital. When the Japanese military ordered nurses to treat Japanese military personnel before native Chamorros, Shelton would smuggle medicine and medical supplies to local people in order to ensure their well-being.

Shelton graduated from the Academy of Our Lady of Guam in 2008. Shelton has earned a master's degree in public administration and a Bachelor of Arts in political science and communication from the University of Guam.

== Early career ==
Until 2018, Shelton worked as press secretary for Guam Delegate Madeleine Z. Bordallo. She was also chief of staff for Senator Dennis G. Rodriguez. She was president of Soroptimist International of the Marianas, president of the University of Guam Alumni Association. She is also a member of the Guam Memorial Hospital Volunteer Association, or the "Pink Ladies" and troop leader for the Guam Girl Scouts. She is a parish council member and CCD teacher at Nino Perdido Y Sagrada Familia Catholic Church in Asan, Guam.

== Guam Legislature ==
=== Elections ===
Shelton ran for the incoming 35th Guam Legislature in 2018. She placed 6th in the Democratic primary election in August, advancing to the general election. She placed 6th in the general election in November, earning a seat in the legislature. She is the youngest woman ever elected Senator to the Guam Legislature.

=== Leadership roles ===
- 35th Guam Legislature - Legislative Secretary and Majority Whip
- 35th Guam Legislature - Chairperson, Committee on Higher Education and the Advancement of Women, Youth, and Senior Citizens

=== Accomplishments ===
In March 2019, Shelton brought a Guampedia Women in Guam History exhibit to the Guam Legislature. Shelton, along with other women serving in the 35th Guam Legislature, recorded readings from Guampedia's recent release Famalao’an Guahan: Women in Guam History, which has been broadcast on the Guam Legislature channel. Shelton is the Chairwoman of the Committee for the Advance of Women in the 35th Guam Legislature, the first female majority legislature in history.

Shelton introduced Bill 80-35 in the Guam Legislature to require that the Guam Power Authority generate 50% of its power from renewable energy sources by 2035. Public Law 29-62, authored by then-Sens. Ben Pangelinan, Jim Espaldon and Benjamin Cruz in 2008, set a goal of 25% renewable energy by 2035. At the time, GPA had no renewable energy in its portfolio. As of 2019, 6% of GPA's energy portfolio comes from renewable energy. The solar farm contracts approved in 2018 will bring 120 megawatts online for GPA by 2022, meeting the 25% renewable energy target 13 years early. The new solar farms opening by 2022 will produce solar energy 58.75% cheaper than the previous solar farm. Raising the goal to 50% would eventually save ratepayers $10.4 million a year in the fuel surcharges that show up on their bills.

Shelton introduced Bill 138-35 which would ban the use of vaping products where cigarettes are already banned. The ban on using nicotine products in certain areas is called the Natasha Protection Act, named after Shelton's best friend who died at a young age of cancer. Shelton proposed Bill 139-35 to preserve health insurance for foster children. She collaborated with the Office of the Public Defender to present on issues regarding elder law, which was broadcast on the Legislature Channel.

She also wrote to Department of Interior Assistant Secretary for Insular and International Affairs Douglas Domenech for help in addressing labor shortage and homelessness. Shelton also introduced Bill 157-35 to close loopholes in the sex offender registry.
