= 2014 Guamanian legislative election =

- November 4, 2014

All 15 seats of the Legislature of Guam
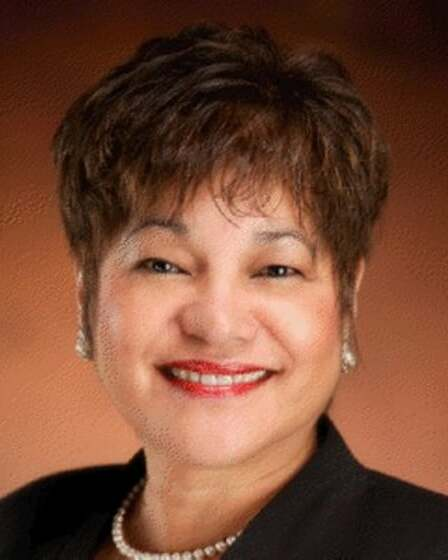

| | Majority party | Minority party |
|---|---|---|
| Leader | Judith T.P. Won Pat | V. Anthony Ada |
| Party | Democratic | Republican |
| Leader's seat | At-large district | At-large district |
| Last election | 9 seats | 6 seats |
| Seats won | 9 | 6 |
| Seat change | Steady | Steady |
Speaker before election
Judith Won Pat
Democratic
Elected Speaker
Judith Won Pat
Democratic

Elections for the Legislature of Guam took place on November 4, 2014, coinciding with the 2014 United States elections and the Guam gubernatorial election. All 15 seats in the Legislature of Guam were up for election.

== Candidates ==
The fifteen candidates who win the most votes go on to the general election. One incumbent seats and only senators is not seeking re-election was Ben Pangelinan to the 33rd Guam Legislature until he died in the office on July 8, 2014.

=== Democratic ===
==== Declared ====
- Frank Aguon Jr. (I)
- Derick Baza Hills
- Dennis G. Rodriguez Jr. (I)
- Rodney A. Cruz Jr.
- Rory J. Respicio (I)
- Judith P. Guthertz
- Adolpho B. Palacios Sr.
- Hope Alvarez Cristobal
- Benjamin J.F. Cruz (I)
- Michael San Nicolas (I)
- Nerissa Bretania Underwood
- Judith T. Won Pat (I)
- Tina Muna Barnes (I)
- Frank "Kool Aid" T. Ungacta Jr.
- Thomas C. Ada (I)

=== Republican ===
- Mary Camacho Torres
- Roland Ray Blas
- Christopher M. Duenas (I)
- Vicente Anthony "Tony" Ada (I)
- Valentino "Val" Gumataotao Perez
- Glenn A. Leon Guerrero
- Frank F. Blas Jr.
- Thomas "Tommy" Morrison (I)
- Brant McCreadie (I)
- James "Jim" Espaldon
- Aline A. Yamashita (I)
- Adonis J.C. Mendiola
- Michelle Hope Taitano
- William "Wil" Castro
- Felix Crisostomo Benavente

==== Eliminated ====
- Romeo Carlos

=== Declined ===
==== Democratic ====
- Ben Pangelinan

==== Republican ====
- Eric Palacios
- Javier Atalig
- Michael Limtiaco
- Paul Sardoma
- Ray Cruz Haddock
- Victor A. Gaza

== Primary elections ==
The members are elected at-large with the first 15 winning candidates are elected as the new members of the legislature. As there were many candidates running, primaries were set on August 30, 2014, for both the Democratic and Republican parties.

=== Results ===
==== Democratic primary results ====
Democratic Party of Guam primary election, 2014
| Party | Candidate | Votes | % |
|---|---|---|---|
| Democratic | Frank B. Aguon Jr. (incumbent) | 6,556 | 7.93 |
| Democratic | Dennis G. Rodriguez Jr. (incumbent) | 6,420 | 7.77 |
| Democratic | Benjamin J.F. Cruz (incumbent) | 6,292 | 7.61 |
| Democratic | Thomas C. Ada (incumbent) | 5,997 | 7.25 |
| Democratic | Michael San Nicolas (incumbent) | 5,974 | 7.23 |
| Democratic | Tina Muña Barnes (incumbent) | 5,918 | 7.16 |
| Democratic | Rory J. Respicio (incumbent) | 5,792 | 7.01 |
| Democratic | Judith Won Pat (incumbent) | 5,789 | 7.00 |
| Democratic | Nerissa Bretania Underwood | 5,654 | 6.84 |
| Democratic | Judith P. Guthertz | 5,382 | 6.51 |
| Democratic | Adolpho B. Palacios Sr. | 5,080 | 6.14 |
| Democratic | Hope Alvarez Cristobal | 4,946 | 5.98 |
| Democratic | Derick Baza Hills | 4,639 | 5.61 |
| Democratic | Rodney A. Cruz Jr. | 4,380 | 5.30 |
| Democratic | Frank "Kool Aid" T. Ungacta Jr. | 3,735 | 4.52 |
| Democratic | Write-in candidates | 120 | .15 |
| Turnout | | 49,249 | |

==== Republican primary results ====
Republican Party of Guam primary election, 2014
| Party | Candidate | Votes | % | ±% |
|---|---|---|---|---|
| Republican | Vicente Anthony "Tony" Ada | 9,139 | 8.13 | |
| Republican | Thomas "Tommy" Morrison | 8,800 | 7.83 | |
| Republican | James "Jim" Espaldon | 8,338 | 7.42 | |
| Republican | Christopher M. Duenas | 8,296 | 7.38 | |
| Republican | Frank Blas Jr. | 8,203 | 7.30 | |
| Republican | William "Wil" Castro | 7,474 | 6.65 | |
| Republican | Aline A. Yamashita | 7,460 | 6.64 | |
| Republican | Brant T. McCreadie | 7,305 | 6.50 | |
| Republican | Adonis J.C. Mendiola | 7,117 | 6.33 | |
| Republican | Glenn A. Leon Guerrero | 6,904 | 6.14 | |
| Republican | Mary Camacho Torres | 6,701 | 5.96 | |
| Republican | Roland Ray Blas | 6,254 | 5.57 | |
| Republican | MiChelle Hope Taitano | 5,786 | 5.15 | |
| Republican | Felix C. Benavente | 5,530 | 4.92 | |
| Republican | Valentino Gumataotao Perez | 5,604 | 4.86 | |
| Republican | Romeo Carlos | 3,451 | 3.07 | |
| Republican | Write-in candidates | 151 | .13 | |
| Turnout | | 63,545 | | |

== General Elections ==
The members of the legislature are elected at-large with the first 15 winning candidates elected as the new members of the legislature. The Democrats and Republican Party had retain their seats, for the next legislature at 9 Democrats and 6 Republicans

2014 Guam legislative election
| Party | Candidate | Votes | % | ±% |
|---|---|---|---|---|
| Democratic | Frank B. Aguon Jr. | 23,089 | 5.38 | n/a |
| Democratic | Dennis G. Rodriguez Jr. | 21,705 | 5.06 | n/a |
| Republican | Vicente Anthony "Tony" Ada | 20,269 | 4.72 | n/a |
| Republican | Jim Espaldon | 19,444 | 4.53 | n/a |
| Republican | Thomas "Tommy" Morrison | 19,381 | 4.52 | n/a |
| Democratic | Thomas C. Ada | 19,006 | 4.43 | n/a |
| Republican | Mary Camacho Torres | 17,758 | 4.14 | n/a |
| Democratic | Nerissa Bretania Underwood | 16,760 | 3.91 | n/a |
| Democratic | Judith Won Pat | 16,726 | 3.91 | n/a |
| Democratic | Michael San Nicolas | 16,650 | 3.88 | n/a |
| Democratic | Tina Muna Barnes | 16,521 | 3.85 | n/a |
| Republican | Frank Blas Jr. | 16,452 | 3.83 | n/a |
| Democratic | Benjamin J.F. Cruz | 15,950 | 3.72 | n/a |
| Democratic | Rory J. Respicio | 15,671 | 3.65 | n/a |
| Republican | Brant McCreadie | 15,478 | 3.61 | n/a |
| Republican | Aline A. Yamashita | 15,134 | 3.53 | n/a |
| Republican | Christopher M. Duenas | 14,976 | 3.49 | n/a |
| Republican | William "Wil" Castro | 14,526 | 3.39 | n/a |
| Republican | Adonis J.C. Mendiola | 13,210 | 3.08 | n/a |
| Republican | Glenn A. Leon Guerrero | 13,000 | 3.03 | n/a |
| Democratic | Adolpho B. Palacios | 12,406 | 2.89 | n/a |
| Democratic | Judith Guthertz | 11,875 | 2.77 | n/a |
| Democratic | Hope Alvarez Cristobal | 10,776 | 2.51 | n/a |
| Republican | Roland Ray Blas | 10,222 | 2.38 | n/a |
| Democratic | Derick Baza Hills | 9,234 | 2.15 | n/a |
| Republican | MiChelle Hope Taitano | 8,906 | 2.08 | n/a |
| Republican | Felix C. Benavente | 6,964 | 1.62 | n/a |
| Republican | Valentino Gumataotao Perez | 6,710 | 1.56 | n/a |
| Democratic | Rodney A. Cruz Jr. | 6,412 | 1.49 | n/a |
| Democratic | Frank "Kool Aid" T. Ungacta Jr. | 3,332 | .78 | n/a |
| Majority | | 3,780 | | |
| Turnout | | 118,689 | | |
| Democratic gain from Republican | | | | |

== Incoming Senators to the 33rd Guam Legislature ==
There were 15 senators elected on November 4, 2014, to serve in the 33rd Guam Legislature and were inaugurated on January 5, 2015:

=== Democratic ===
==== Incumbents ====
- Judith Won Pat
- Benjamin Cruz
- Tina Rose Muña Barnes
- Thomas C. Ada
- Rory J. Respicio
- Dennis G. Rodriguez Jr.
- Frank Blas Aguon Jr.
- Michael San Nicolas

==== Freshman ====
- Nerissa Bretania Underwood

=== Republican ===
==== Incumbents ====
- Vicente Anthony "Tony" Ada
- Thomas "Tommy" Aaron Morrison
- Brant McCreadie

==== Freshman ====
- Frank Flores Blas Jr. (returning)
- James "Jim" V. Espaldon (returning)
- Mary Camacho Torres

== See also ==
- 2018 Guam gubernatorial election
- 2018 Guam general election
