= 2010 Guamanian legislative election =

- November 2, 2010

All 15 seats of the Legislature of Guam
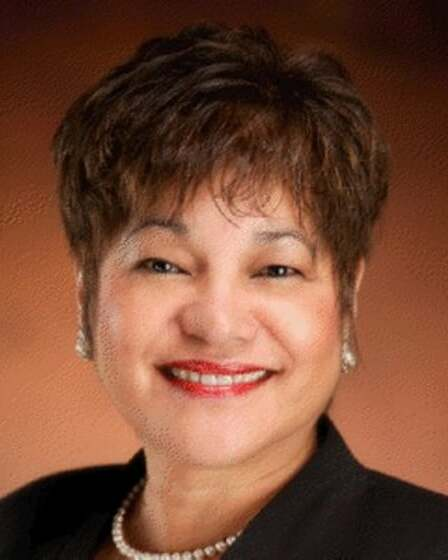

	Majority party	Minority party
Leader	Judith T.P. Won Pat	Frank F. Blas Jr.
Party	Democratic	Republican
Leader's seat	At-large district	At-large district
Last election	10 seats	5 seats
Seats won	9	6
Seat change	▼1	▲1
Speaker before election
Judith Won Pat
Democratic
Elected Speaker
Judith Won Pat
Democratic

An election for the Legislature of Guam took place on November 2, 2010, coinciding with the 2010 United States general elections and the Guam gubernatorial election. All 15 seats in the Legislature of Guam were up for election.

== Primary Election ==
The members are elected at-large with the first 15 winning candidates are elected as the new members of the legislature. As there were many candidates running, primaries were set on September 4, 2010, for both the Democratic and Republican parties. The fifteen candidates who win the most votes go on to the general election.

== General election candidates ==
List of candidates running for election in 2010 as they appear on the 2010 ballot. The top fifteen vote winners from either political party will be elected. (I) indicates an incumbent member seeking re-election.

=== Democratic candidates ===
- Judith T.P. Won Pat (I)
- Sarah M. Thomas-Nededog
- Trinidad "Trini" T. Torres
- Tina Muña Barnes (I)
- Benjamin J.F. Cruz (I)
- Rory J. Respicio (I)
- Steven A. Dierking
- Thomas "Tom" C. Ada (I)
- Dennis G. Rodriguez Jr.
- Adolpho B. Palacios Sr.
- Corinna Gutierrez-Ludwig
- Judith Paulette Guthertz (I)
- Vicente "Ben" Pangelinan (I)
- Joe Shimizu San Agustin
- Jonathan Blas Diaz

==== Defeated in primary ====
- Robert L.G. Benavente
- Jonathan Q. Carriaga
- Phillipe J. Cruz
- Tomas Megofna Fejeran

=== Republican candidates ===
- Frank F. Blas Jr. (I)
- Vicente Anthony "Tony" Ada (I)
- William Q. Sarmiento
- Telo Teresa Taitague (I)
- Mana Silva Taijeron
- William "Bill" Taitague
- Ray Cruz Haddock
- Shirley "Sam" Mabini
- Victor Anthony Gaza
- John B. Benavente
- Stephen J. Guerrero
- Christopher M. Duenas
- Velma Harper
- Douglas Moylan
- Aline A. Yamashita

==== Defeated in primary ====
- Dennis T. Borja
- Armando S. Dominguez
- Paul L.G. Reyes
- Margarita Q. Taitano

== Primary Election ==
The members are elected at-large with the first 15 winning candidates are elected as the new members of the legislature. As there were many candidates running, primaries were set on September 4, 2010, for both the Democratic and Republican parties. The first fifteen candidates who win the highest votes go on to the general election.

=== Democratic Party Primary ===
2010 Democratic primary results
Party	Candidate	Votes	%
Democratic	Judith Won Pat (incumbent)	6,284	
Democratic	Tina Muña Barnes (incumbent)	6,149	
Democratic	Rory J. Respicio (incumbent)	5,991	
Democratic	Thomas C. Ada (incumbent)	5,891	
Democratic	Corina Gutierrez-Ludwig	5,500	
Democratic	Judith P. Guthertz (incumbent)	5,442	
Democratic	Benjamin J.F. Cruz (incumbent)	5,421	
Democratic	Vicente "Ben" C. Pangelinan (incumbent)	5,402	
Democratic	Dennis G. Rodriguez Jr.	5,386	
Democratic	Adolpho B. Palacios Sr. (incumbent)	5,118	
Democratic	Joe S. San Agustin	5,087	
Democratic	Sarah M. Thomas-Nededog	4,377	
Democratic	Steven A. Dierking	4,364	
Democratic	Trinidad "Trini" T. Torres	3,719	
Democratic	Jonathan B. Diaz	3,646	
Democratic	Phillipe J. Cruz	3,335	
Democratic	Johnathan Q. Carriaga	3,107	
Democratic	Tomas Megofna Fejeran	2,897	
Democratic	Robert L.G. Benavente	2,800	
Democratic	Write-in candidates	104	
Turnout			

=== Republican Party Primary ===
2010 Republican primary results
Party	Candidate	Votes	%
Republican	Vicente Anthony "Tony" Ada (incumbent)	10,348	
Republican	Frank F. Blas Jr. (incumbent)	10,011	
Republican	Aline A. Yamashita	9,720	
Republican	Mana Silva Taijeron	9,140	
Republican	Christopher M. Duenas (incumbent)	8,599	
Republican	Telo Teresa Taitague (incumbent)	8,193	
Republican	Douglas B. Moylan	7,702	
Republican	Ray C. Haddock	7,945	
Republican	Shirley "Sam" Mabini	7,323	
Republican	Stephen J. Guerrero	6,977	
Republican	Victor Anthony Gaza	6,601	
Republican	John B. Benavente	5,977	
Republican	William "Bill" U. Taitague	5,877	
Republican	William "Bill" Q. Sarmiento	5,861	
Republican	Velma Harper	5,796	
Republican	Dennis T. Borja	5,351	
Republican	Paul L.G. Reyes	4,574	
Republican	Margarita Q. Taitano	4,418	
Republican	Armando S. Dominguez	3,832	
Republican	Write-in candidates	317	
Turnout			

== General election results ==
Following the primaries, there were 26 candidates vying for the 15 seats in the Legislature of Guam. The members are elected at-large with the first 15 winning candidates are elected as the new members of the legislature.

2010 Guam legislative general election results
Party	Candidate	Votes	%
Democratic	Thomas "Tom" C. Ada (incumbent)	22,078	
Democratic	Judith Won Pat (incumbent)	21,775	
Democratic	Tina Muña Barnes (incumbent)	21,145	
Democratic	Vicente "Ben" C. Pangelinan (incumbent)	21,110	
Republican	Aline A. Yamashita	19,851	
Democratic	Dennis G. Rodriguez Jr.	19,674	
Democratic	Rory J. Respicio (incumbent)	19,177	
Republican	Vicente Anthony "Tony" Ada (incumbent)	18,594	
Republican	Frank F. Blas Jr. (incumbent)	18,374	
Democratic	Adolpho B. Palacios Sr. (incumbent)	18,203	
Democratic	Judith P. Guthertz (incumbent)	17,524	
Republican	Mana Silva Taijeron	17,172	
Democratic	Benjamin J.F. Cruz (incumbent)	16,538	
Republican	Christopher M. Duenas	16,051	
Republican	Shirley "Sam" Mabini	16,035	
Republican	Ray C. Haddock	15,995	
Republican	Telo Teresa Taitague (incumbent)	15,895	
Democratic	Corina Gutierrez-Ludwig	15,040	
Democratic	Joe S. San Agustin	14,724	
Democratic	Steven A. Dierking	14,256	
Democratic	Sarah M. Thomas-Nededog	14,119	
Republican	Douglas B. Moylan	13,841	
Republican	Stephen J. Guerrero	13,492	
Republican	Victor Anthony Gaza	11,611	
Republican	Velma Harper	10,968	
Democratic	Jonathan B. Diaz	10,421	n/a
Republican	William "Bill" Q. Sarmiento	10,247	n/a
Republican	William "Bill" U. Taitague	10,119	
Democratic	Trinidad T. Torres	9,880	
Republican	John B. Benavente	9,714	
Majority		3,780	
Turnout		118,689	
Democratic gain from Republican			
