= 2012 Guamanian legislative election =

- November 6, 2012

All 15 seats in the Legislature of Guam
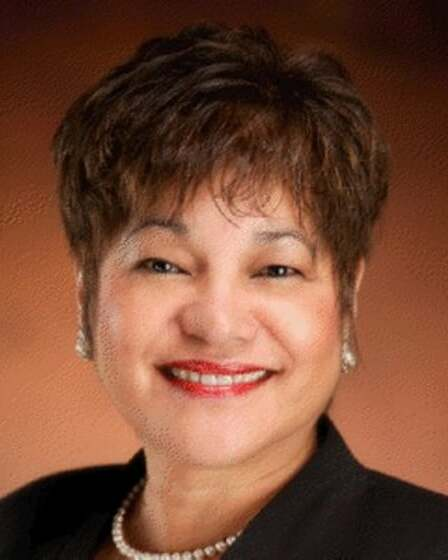

	Majority party	Minority party
Leader	Judith Won Pat	V. Anthony Ada
Party	Democratic	Republican
Leader's seat	At-large district	At-large district
Last election	9 seats	6 seats
Seats won	9	6
Seat change	Steady	Steady
Popular vote	211,475	176,740
Percentage	54.41%	45.47%
Speaker before election
Judith Won Pat
Democratic
Elected Speaker
Judith Won Pat
Democratic

Elections for the Legislature of Guam were held on November 6, 2012, alongside a referendum on a for-profit bingo initiative. The Democratic Party won nine of the fifteen seats in the Legislature, whilst the referendum was rejected by 64.8% of voters.

== Results ==
=== Legislature ===
Party	Votes	%	Seats	+/–
Democratic Party	211,475	54.41	9	
Republican Party	176,740	45.47	6	
Write-in votes	441	0.11	–	–
Invalid/blank votes	122,469	–	–	–
Total	511,125	100	15	0
Registered voters/turnout		67	–	–
Source: GEC

=== Referendum ===
Choice	Votes	%
For	10,920	35.49
Against	19,850	64.51
Invalid/blank votes	3,252	–
Total	34,022	100
Registered voters/turnout	50,700	67.10
Source: Direct Democracy

== Candidates ==
=== Democratic ===
- Michael F. Q. San Nicolas
- Benjamin J.F. Cruz (I)
- Benedicto C. Toves
- Judith T.P. Won Pat (I)
- Vicente "Ben" C. Pangelinan (I)
- Thomas "Tom" C. Ada (I)
- Judith P. Guthertz (I)
- Adolpho B. Palacios Sr. (I)
- Leah Beth Naholowaa
- Frank Blas Aguon Jr.
- Rory J. Respicio (I)
- Tina Muña Barnes (I)
- Dennis G. Rodriguez Jr. (I)
- Joe Shimizu San Agustin
- Gary W.F. Gumataotao

=== Republican ===
- Christopher M. Duenas (I)
- Michelle Hope Taitano
- Antonio A. Aquiningoc
- Jose S. Servino
- Mana Silva Taijeron (I)
- Brant T. McCreadie
- Vicente Anthony "Tony" Ada (I)
- Michael "Mike" Troy Limtiaco
- Thomas "Tommy" Morrison
- Roland Ray Blas
- Aline A. Yamashita (I)
- Shirley "Sam" Mabini (I)
- Javier M. Atalig
- Adonis J.C. Mendiola
- William "Bill" Q. Sarmiento

==== Eliminated ====
- Elmore "Moe" Cotton

== Primary Election ==
The members are elected at-large with the first 15 winning candidates are elected as the new members of the legislature. As there were many candidates running, primaries were set on September 1, 2012, for both the Democratic and Republican parties. The first fifteen candidates who win the highest votes go on to the general election.

=== Democratic Party Primary ===
Democratic primary results
Party	Candidate	Votes	%
Democratic	Dennis G. Rodriguez Jr. (incumbent)	7,721	8.01%
Democratic	Frank B. Aguon Jr. (incumbent)	7,572	7.86%
Democratic	Thomas C. Ada (incumbent)	7,447	7.73%
Democratic	Tina Muña Barnes (incumbent)	6,833	7.09%
Democratic	Benjamin J.F. Cruz (incumbent)	6,697	6.95%
Democratic	Judith T. Won Pat (incumbent)	6,674	6.92%
Democratic	Vicente "Ben" C. Pangelinan (incumbent)	6,570	6.91%
Democratic	Michael F.Q. San Nicolas	6,570	6.82%
Democratic	Rory J. Respicio (incumbent)	6,392	6.63%
Democratic	Joe S. San Agustin	6,382	6.62%
Democratic	Adolpho B. Palacios Sr. (incumbent)	6,306	6.54%
Democratic	Judith P. Guthertz (incumbent)	6,175	6.41%
Democratic	Leah Beth O. Naholowaa	5,401	5.60%
Democratic	Gary W.F. Gumataotao	4,457	5.09%
Democratic	Benedicto C. Toves	4,442	4.61%
Democratic	Write-in candidates	11,594	54.24%
Turnout			

=== Republican Party Primary ===
Republican primary results
Party	Candidate	Votes	%
Republican	Thomas "Tommy" Morrison	5,175	8.19%
Republican	Michael Troy Limtiaco	5,012	7.93%
Republican	Vicente Anthony "Tony" Ada (incumbent)	4,979	7.88%
Republican	Christopher M. Duenas (incumbent)	4,763	7.54%
Republican	Mana Silva Taijeron (incumbent)	4,553	7.20%
Republican	Brant T. McCreadie	4,516	7.15%
Republican	Aline A. Yamashita (incumbent)	4,421	7.00%
Republican	Roland Ray Blas	3,944	6.24%
Republican	Adonis J.C. Mendiola	3,890	6.16%
Republican	Shirley "Sam" Mabini (incumbent)	3,579	5.66%
Republican	Michelle Hope Taitano	3,553	5.62%
Republican	Javier M. Atalig	3,196	5.06%
Republican	William "Bill" Q. Sarmiento	3,109	4.92%
Republican	Jose S. Servino	3,013	4.77%
Republican	Antonio A. Aquiningoc	2,804	4.44%
Republican	Elmore "Moe" Cotton	2,571	4.07%
Republican	Write-in candidates		%
Turnout			

==== Eliminated candidates ====
On Republican is eliminated in the 2012 primaries:

- Elmore "Moe" Cotton

== General election results ==
Following the primaries, there were 26 candidates vying for the 15 seats in the Legislature of Guam. The members are elected at-large with the first 15 winning candidates are elected as the new members of the legislature.

2012 Guam legislative election
Party	Candidate	Votes	%
Democratic	Dennis G. Rodriguez Jr. (incumbent)	20,038	
Democratic	Frank B. Aguon Jr. (incumbent)	19,518	
Democratic	Thomas C. Ada (incumbent)	18,079	
Republican	Thomas "Tommy" Morrison	16,983	
Democratic	Michael F.Q. San Nicolas	16,625	
Republican	Vicente Anthony "Tony" Ada (incumbent)	15,796	
Republican	Michael Troy Limtiaco	15,787	
Republican	Christopher M. Duenas (incumbent)	15,703	
Democratic	Benjamin J.F. Cruz (incumbent)	15,090	
Democratic	Judith T.P. Won Pat (incumbent)	15,031	
Democratic	Tina Muña Barnes (incumbent)	14,746	
Democratic	Vicente "Ben" C. Pangelinan (incumbent)	14,707	
Republican	Aline A. Yamashita (incumbent)	14,203	
Republican	Brant T. McCreadie	14,058	
Democratic	Rory J. Respicio (incumbent)	14,042	
Democratic	Adolpho B. Palacios Sr. (incumbent)	13,656	
Democratic	Joe S. San Agustin	13,447	
Republican	Mana Silva Taijeron (incumbent)	12,936	
Democratic	Judith P. Guthertz (incumbent)	12,612	
Republican	Adonis J.C. Mendiola	11,785	
Republican	Shirley "Sam" Mabini (incumbent)	11,153	
Republican	Roland Ray Blas	11,038	
Democratic	Leah Beth O. Nahalowaa	9,775	
Republican	Michelle Hope Taitano	9,222	
Republican	William "Bill" Q. Sarmiento	8,463	
Democratic	Gary W.F. Gumataotao	8,417	
Republican	Jose S. Servino	7,791	
Republican	Javier M. Atalig	6,481	
Democratic	Benidicto C. Toves	5,692	
Republican	Antonio Aquiningoc	5,341	
Majority		3,780	
Turnout		118,689	
Democratic gain from Republican			

== Incoming Senators to the 32nd Guam Legislature ==
There were 15 senators elected on November 6, 2012, to serve in the 32nd Guam Legislature and were inaugurated on January 7, 2013:

=== Democratic ===
==== Incumbents ====
- Judith Won Pat
- Benjamin Cruz
- Tina Rose Muña Barnes
- Thomas C. Ada
- Rory J. Respicio
- Ben Pangelinan
- Dennis G. Rodriguez Jr.

==== Freshman ====
- Frank B. Aguon Jr. (returning)
- Michael San Nicolas

=== Republican ===
==== Incumbents ====
- Christopher M. Duenas
- Vicente Anthony "Tony" Ada
- Aline A. Yamashita

==== Freshman ====
- Thomas "Tommy" Morrison
- Brant McCreadie
- Michael Limtiaco
