= 29th Guam Legislature =

The 29th Guam Legislature was a meeting of the Guam Legislature. It convened in Hagatna, Guam on January 1, 2007, and ended on January 5, 2009, during the 1st and 2nd years of Felix P. Camacho's 2nd Gubernatorial Term.

In the 2006 Guamanian general election, the Republican Party of Guam won a bare majority of seats in the Guam Legislature. Following the death of Republican Senator Antonio R. Unpingco on October 18, 2007, a special election was held in January 2008, at which former Democratic Senator Benjamin J.F. Cruz was elected, shifting the majority to the Democratic Party of Guam. The Democratic caucus took control of the leadership of the 29th Guam Legislature in March 2008

== Party summary ==
Affiliation	Party (shading indicates majority caucus)		Total	Vacant
Affiliation	Democratic	Republican	Total	Vacant
End of previous legislature	6	9	15	0
January 1, 2007 - October 18, 2007	7	8	15	0
Voting share	46.7%	53.3%		
October 18, 2007 - January 10, 2008	7	7	15	1
Voting share	50.0%	50.0%		
January 10, 2008 - January 5, 2009	8	7	15	0
Latest voting share	53.3%	46.7%		
Beginning of the next legislature	10	5	15	0

== Leadership ==
=== Until September 2008 ===
==== Legislative ====
- Speaker: Mark Forbes
- Vice Speaker: Edward J.B. Calvo
- Legislative Secretary: Ray Tenorio

==== Majority (Republican) ====
- Majority Leader: Mark Forbes

==== Minority (Democratic) ====
- Minority Leader: Rory J. Respicio
- Asst. Minority Leader: Judith P. Guthertz, DPA
- Minority Whip: Adolpho B. Palacios Sr.
- Asst. Minority Whip: Vicente C. "Ben" Pangelinan

=== After September 2008 ===
==== Legislative ====
- Speaker: Judith T.P. Won Pat
- Vice Speaker: David L.G. Shimizu
- Legislative Secretary: Tina Rose Muna Barnes

==== Majority (Democratic) ====
- Majority Leader: Rory J. Respicio
- Asst. Majority Leader: Judith P. Guthertz, DPA
- Majority Whip: Adolpho B. Palacios Sr.
- Asst. Majority Whip: Vicente C. "Ben" Pangelinan

==== Minority (Republican) ====
- Minority Leader: Mark Forbes

== Membership ==
Senator	Party	Assumed office	Residence	Born
Mark Forbes	Republican	1995		
Edward J.B. Calvo	Republican	2005		
Ray Tenorio	Republican	2003		
James V. Espaldon	Republican	2007		
Antonio R. Unpingco*	Republican	2005		
Jesse A. Lujan	Republican	2003		
Frank F. Blas Jr.	Republican	2007		
Frank Ishizaki	Republican	2007		
Judith T.P. Won Pat	Democratic	2005	Inarajan	1949
Tina Muna Barnes	Democratic	2007	Mangilao	1962
Rory J. Respicio	Democratic	2003	Agana Heights	1973
Adolpho B. Palacios, Sr.	Democratic	2005	Ordot-Chalan Pago	
Vicente C. "Ben" Pangelinan	Democratic	2007	Mangilao	1955
David L.G. Shimizu	Democratic	2007		
Judith P. Guthertz, DPA	Democratic	2007	Mangilao	
Benjamin J.F. Cruz	Democratic	January 10, 2008	Tumon	1951

== Committees ==
Committee	Chair
Committee on Education, General and Omnibus Matters	Mark Forbes
Committee on Finance, Taxation & Economic Development	Edward J.B. Calvo
Committee on Public Safety, Criminal Justice and Youth	Ray Tenorio
Committee on Judiciary, Natural Resources, Infrastructure & Cultural Affairs	James V. Espaldon
Committee on Tourism, Maritime, Military, Veterans & Foreign Affairs	Antonio R. Unpingco
Committee on Agenda	Jesse A. Lujan
Committee on Aviation, Federal Affairs, Labor, Housing, Banking & Insurance	Jesse A. Lujan
Committee on Health, Human Services & Homeland Security	Frank F. Blas, Jr.
Committee on Calendar	Frank Ishizaki
Committee on General Governmental Operations and Organization	Frank Ishizaki
