= 30th Guam Legislature =

The 30th Guam Legislature was a meeting of the Guam Legislature. It convened in Hagatna, Guam on January 5, 2009 and ended on January 3, 2011, during the 3rd and 4th years of Felix Camacho's 2nd Gubernatorial Term.

In the 2008 Guamanian legislative election, the Democratic Party of Guam won a majority of seats in the Guam Legislature.

== Party summary ==
Affiliation	Party (shading indicates majority caucus)		Total	Vacant
Affiliation	Democratic	Republican	Total	Vacant
End of previous legislature	8	7	15	0
Begin (January 5, 2009)	10	5	15	0
Latest voting share	66.7%	33.3%		
Special Election (March 22, 2010)	9	6	15	0
Latest voting share	60.0%	40.0%		
Beginning of the next legislature	9	6	15	0

== Leadership ==
=== Legislative ===
- Speaker: Judith T.P. Won Pat
- Vice Speaker: Benjamin J.F. Cruz
- Legislative Secretary: Tina Rose Muña Barnes

=== Majority (Democratic) ===
- Majority Leader: Rory J. Respicio
- Assistant Majority Leader: Judith P. Guthertz, DPA
- Majority Whip: Thomas C. Ada

=== Minority (Republican) ===
- Minority Leader: Edward J.B. Calvo
- Assistant Minority Leader: Ray Tenorio
- Minority Whip: James V. Espaldon
- Assistant Minority Whip: Telo T. Taitague

== Membership ==
Senator	Party	Assumed office	Residence	Born
Judith T.P. Won Pat	Democratic	2005	Inarajan	1949
Benjamin J.F. Cruz	Democratic	2008	Tumon	1951
Tina Muna Barnes	Democratic	2007	Mangilao	1962
Rory J. Respicio	Democratic	2003	Agana Heights	1973
Judith P. Guthertz, DPA	Democratic	2007	Mangilao	
Thomas C. Ada	Democratic	2009	Mangilao	1949
Adolpho B. Palacios Sr.	Democratic	2005	Ordot-Chalan Pago	
Vicente C. "Ben" Pangelinan	Democratic	2007	Mangilao	1955
Frank B. Aguon Jr.	Democratic	2009	Yona	1966
Matt Rector	Democratic	2009 (Resigned January 19, 2010)		
Edward J.B. Calvo	Republican	2005		
Ray Tenorio	Republican	2003		
James V. Espaldon	Republican	2007		
Telo T. Taitague	Republican	2009		
Frank F. Blas Jr.	Republican	2007		
V. Anthony "Tony" Ada	Republican	March 22, 2010		1967

On January 19, 2010, Democratic Senator Matt Rector resigned from office. Former Republican candidate, Vicente Anthony "Tony" Ada, was declared the winner of the special election held to fill the vacancy resulting from the Rector resignation. He was sworn-in as Senator on March 22, 2010.

== Committees ==
Committee	Chair	Vice Chair
Committee on Rules, Natural Resources and Federal, Foreign & Micronesian Affairs	Rory J. Respicio	Judith P. Guthertz, DPA
Committee on Education	Judith T. Won Pat, Ed.D.	Judith P. Guthertz, DPA
Committee on Tourism, Cultural Affairs, Public Broadcasting and Youth	Benjamin J.F. Cruz	Tina Muna Barnes
Committee on Municipal Affairs, Aviation, Housing & Recreation	Tina Muna Barnes	Benjamin J.F. Cruz
Committee on the Guam Military Buildup and Homeland Security	Judith P. Guthertz, DPA	Rory J. Respicio
Committee on Utilities, Transportation, Public Works & Veterans Affairs	Thomas C. Ada	Adolpho B. Palacios Sr.
Committee on Labor, Public Structure, Public Libraries & Technology	Matt Rector, then Adolpho B. Palacios Sr.	Adolpho B. Palacios Sr., then none
Committee on Appropriations, Taxation, Banking, Insurance, Retirement & Land	Vicente C. "Ben" Pangelinan	Judith T. Won Pat, Ed.D.
Committee on Public Safety, Law Enforcement & Senior Citizens	Adolpho B. Palacios Sr.	Ray Tenorio
Committee on Economic Development, Health & Human Services and Judiciary	Frank B. Aguon Jr.	Adolpho B. Palacios Sr.
