= 2008 Guamanian legislative election =

- November 4, 2008

All 15 seats of the Legislature of Guam
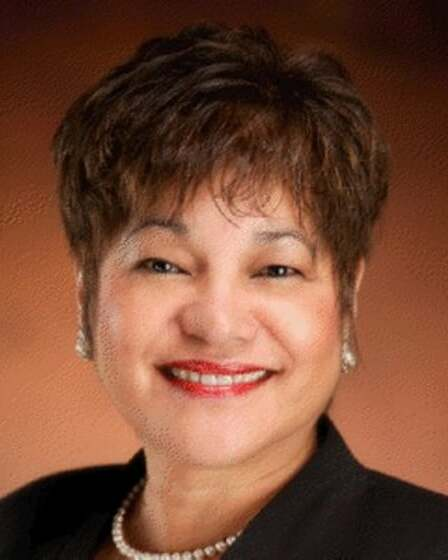

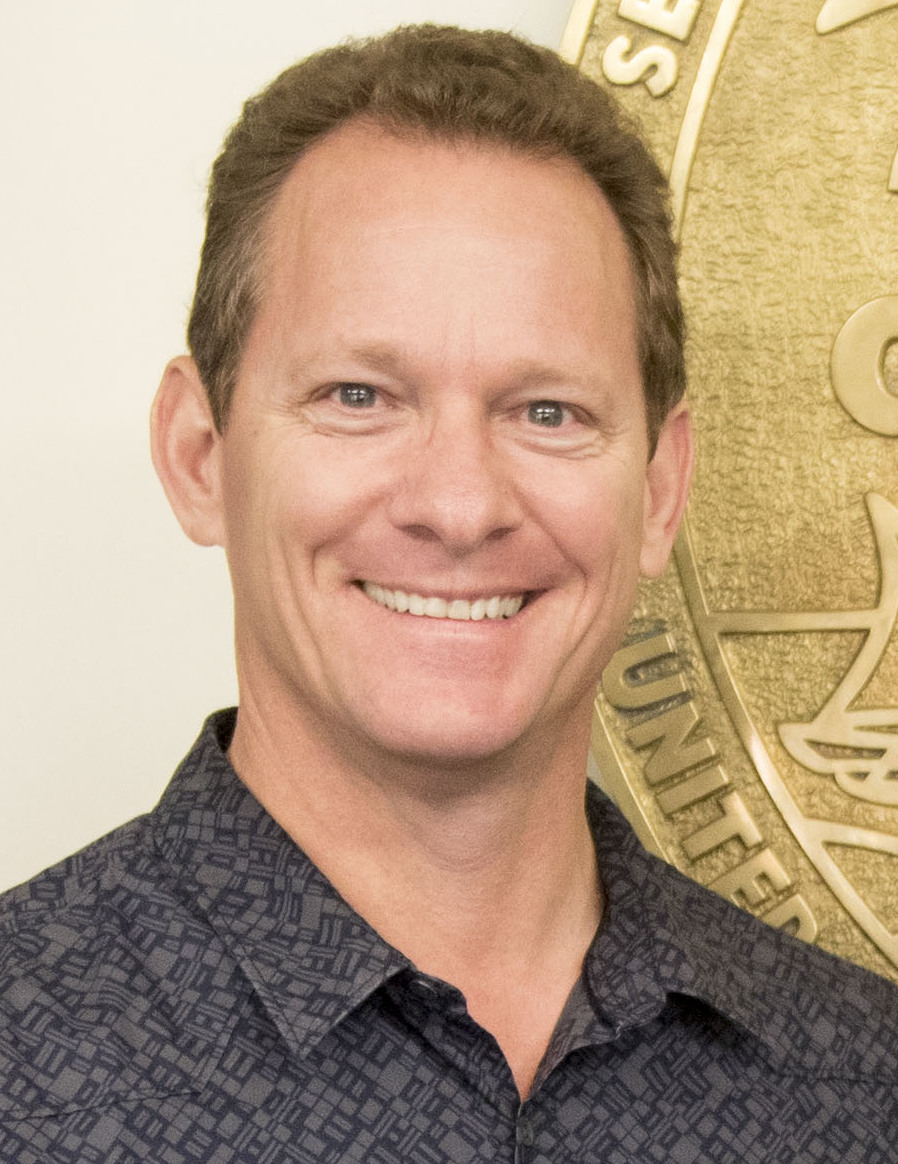
	Majority party	Minority party
Leader	Judith T.P. Won Pat	Ray Tenorio
Party	Democratic	Republican
Leader's seat	At-large district	At-large district
Last election	7 seats	8 seats
Seats won	10	5
Seat change	▲3	▼3
Popular vote	231,409	158,300
Speaker before election
Judith Won Pat
Democratic
Elected Speaker
Judith Won Pat
Democratic

An election for the Legislature of Guam took place on Tuesday, November 4, 2008, coinciding with the 2008 United States general elections and the Guam general election. Democrats defeated three Republican incumbents: Mark Forbes, Frank Ishizaki and Jesse Lujan however one Democratic incumbent was defeated namely Vice-Speaker David Shimizu.

== Guam legislative candidates ==
=== Democratic candidates ===
- Thomas C. Ada
- Frank B. Aguon Jr.
- Robert L.G. Benavente
- Benjamin J.F. Cruz (I)
- Phillipe J. Cruz
- Luis P. Duenas
- Judith P. Guthertz (I)
- Joseph Leon Guerrero
- Tina Muña Barnes (I)
- Adolpho B. Palacios Sr. (I)
- Vicente "Ben" C. Pangelinan (I)
- Matthew J. Rector
- Rory J. Respicio (I)
- Rosanna San Miguel
- Vice Speaker David L.G. Shimizu (I)
- Speaker Judith T.P. Won Pat (I)

=== Republican candidates ===
- Vicente Anthony "Tony" Ada
- Frank Flores Blas Jr. (I)
- Dennis T. Borja
- Eddie Calvo (I)
- Jim Espaldon (I)
- Mark Forbes (I)
- Frankie T. Ishizaki (I)
- Jesse "Jess" Anderson Lujan (I)
- Douglas B. Moylan
- Telo Teresa Taitague
- Ray Tenorio (I)

== Primary Election ==
The members are elected at-large with the first 15 winning candidates are elected as the new members of the legislature. As there were many candidates running, primaries were set on September 6, 2008, for both the Democratic and Republican parties. The first fifteen candidates who win the highest votes go on to the general election.

=== Democratic Party Primary ===
2008 Guam Legislature Primary Election (Democratic Party)
Party	Candidate	Votes	%
Democratic	Frank B. Aguon Jr.	8,795	4.64%
Democratic	Benjamin J.F. Cruz (incumbent)	8,432	4.45%
Democratic	Vicente "Ben" Pangelinan (incumbent)	8,289	4.38%
Democratic	Judith Won Pat (incumbent)	8,009	4.23%
Democratic	Thomas C. Ada	7,936	4.19%
Democratic	Rory J. Respicio (incumbent)	7,415	3.92%
Democratic	Tina Muña Barnes (incumbent)	7,317	3.86%
Democratic	David L.G. Shimizu (incumbent)	7,169	3.79%
Democratic	Adolpho B. Palacios Sr. (incumbent)	7,145	3.77%
Democratic	Judith P. Guthertz (incumbent)	6,987	3.69%
Democratic	Joseph Leon Guerrero	5,633	2.97%
Democratic	Matthew J. "Matt" Rector	5,630	2.97%
Democratic	Rosanna San Miguel	5,606	2.96%
Democratic	Robert L.G. Benavente	4,457	2.35%
Democratic	Phillipe J. Cruz	3,950	2.09%
Democratic	Luis P. Duenas	3,941	2.08%
Democratic	Write-in candidates	686	0.36%
Turnout		189,390	

=== Republican Party Primary ===
2008 Guam Legislature Primary Election (Republican Party)
Party	Candidate	Votes	%
Republican	Eddie Calvo (incumbent)	4,150	4.89%
Republican	James Espaldon (incumbent)	3,829	4.51%
Republican	Ray Tenorio (incumbent)	3,508	4.13%
Republican	Frank F. Blas Jr. (incumbent)	3,351	3.95%
Republican	Telo Teresa Taitague	3,305	3.89%
Republican	Frank T. Ishizaki (incumbent)	3,261	3.84%
Republican	Mark Forbes (incumbent)	3,136	3.70%
Republican	Douglas Moylan	2,980	3.51%
Republican	Jesse Anderson Lujan (incumbent)	2,609	3.07%
Republican	Dennis T. Borja	2,592	3.69%
Republican	Vicente Anthony "Tony" Ada	0	0.00%
Republican	Write-in candidates	2,587	3.05%
Turnout		84,870	

== General election results ==
Following the primaries, there were 26 candidates vying for the 15 seats in the Legislature of Guam. The members are elected at-large with the first 15 winning candidates are elected as the new members of the legislature. The Democratic Party gained full control of the legislature with 10 seats, while the Republican Party gaining only five seats.

2008 Guam legislative election
Party	Candidate	Votes	%
Republican	Eddie Calvo (incumbent)	21,862	
Democratic	Frank B. Aguon Jr.	21,311	
Republican	Ray Tenorio (incumbent)	19,275	
Republican	James Espaldon (incumbent)	19,187	
Democratic	Thomas C. Ada	18,767	
Democratic	Vicente "Ben" Pangelinan (incumbent)	18,335	
Democratic	Judith T.P. Won Pat (incumbent)	17,952	
Democratic	Benjamin J.F. Cruz (incumbent)	17,484	
Democratic	Rory J. Respicio (incumbent)	16,567	
Democratic	Tina Muña Barnes (incumbent)	16,112	
Republican	Frank F. Blas Jr. (incumbent)	15,493	
Democratic	Adolpho B. Palacios Sr. (incumbent)	15,322	
Democratic	Judith P. Guthertz (incumbent)	14,595	
Republican	Telo Teresa Taitague	14,552	
Democratic	Matthew J. "Matt" Rector	14,363	
Democratic	David L.G. Shimizu (incumbent)	14,217	
Republican	Vicente Anthony "Tony" Ada	14,010	
Republican	Frank T. Ishizaki (incumbent)	13,907	
Republican	Douglas B. Moylan	13,839	
Republican	Jesse Anderson Lujan (incumbent)	10,813	
Democratic	Rosanna San Miguel	10,641	
Democratic	Joseph Leon Guerrero	10,612	
Republican	Dennis T. Borja	7,725	
Republican	Mark Forbes (incumbent)	7,637	
Democratic	Robert L.G. Benavente	6,090	
Democratic	Phillipe J. Cruz	5,134	
Majority		231,409	
Turnout		389,709	
Democratic gain from Republican			

== Freshman Senators ==
There will be 4 freshman Senators in the 30th Legislature. Four were elected on November 4, 2008.

- Tom Ada (D)
- Frank Aguon, Jr. (D)
- Matt Rector (D)
- Telo Taitague (R)
