= 2004 Guam general election =

General elections were held in Guam on November 2, 2004, in order to elect all 15 members of the legislature, the federal delegate, mayors of 14 cities, vice mayors of three cities, the public auditor, the Consolidated Commission on Utilities, two judges of the Superior Court, running for retention and the Guam Public Education Policy Board. Voters also voted on the President of the United States although the territory sent no representatives to the electoral college. There was also a referendum on allowing gambling, which was rejected by voters.

== Background ==
In the United States territory of Guam, elections to the Legislature and multi-member boards are run via open primary (This following the outlawing of the previous blanket primary similar to Louisiana).

Both the Public Auditor and Consolidated Commission on Utilities are required to be nonpartisan and as such candidates are not allowed to state affiliations or list them on the ballot.

In the case of the Auditor, affiliating with a party is grounds for disqualification.

== Campaign ==
A total of 30 candidates ran for 15 seats in the Legislature, with both the Democratic and Republican parties nominating a full slate.

The Guam Bar Association conducted an internal survey to determine feelings towards the two judges running for retention. Both were given strong marks of approval by the less than 100 members.

During the run-up, "Proposition A", the gaming/gambling legalization measure received significant coverage. A group called "Citizens for Economic Diversity" proposed it.

== Legislative candidates ==
2004 Guam legislative election
- November 2, 2004

All 15 seats of the Legislature of Guam
	Majority party	Minority party
Leader	Mark Forbes	Ben Pangelinan (lost re-election)
Party	Republican	Democratic
Leader's seat	At-large district	At-large district
Last election	6 seats	9 seats
Seats won	9	6
Seat change	▲3	▼3
Speaker before election
Ben Pangelinan
Democratic
Elected Speaker
Mark Forbes
Republican

=== Democratic candidates ===
- Frank B. Aguon Jr. (I)
- John B. Benavente
- Mark C. Charfaurous
- Benjamin J. F. Cruz
- Harold J. Cruz
- Teresita Garrido Cruz
- F. Randall Cundiffe (I)
- Luis P. Duenas
- John E. Farnum
- Judith P. Guthertz
- Romeo M. Hernandez
- Lourdes A. Leon Guerrero (I)
- Sedfrey M. Linsangan
- Tina Muna Barnes (I)
- Theodore "Ted" S. Nelson
- Adolpho B. Palacios Sr.
- Speaker Vicente C. Pangelinan (I)
- Don Parkinson
- Daniel T. Perez
- John "JQ" M. Quinata (I)
- Rory J. Respicio (I)
- Antoinette D. Sanford (I)
- Judith T.P. Won Pat
- Mark Campos Charfaurous

=== Republican candidates ===
- Joanne M. Salas Brown (I)
- Vincent Cristobal Camacho
- Michael W. "Mike" Cruz
- Bertha Mesa Duenas
- Edward J. Baza Calvo
- Christopher M. Duenas
- Sylvia M. Flores
- Mark Forbes
- Victor Anthony Gaza
- Lawrence F. Kasperbauer
- Robert "Bob" Klitzkie
- Jerone T. Landstrom
- Jesse "Jess" Anderson Lujan
- Noel Silan
- Ray Tenorio
- Antonio "Tony" R. Unpingco

=== Declined ===
- Dr. Carmen Fernandez (D)

== Results ==
=== President of the United States ===
Despite not having any electoral votes, Guam approved of George W. Bush by 64% over John Kerry. Ralph Nader and Michael Badnarik both received less than one percent.

2004 United States presidential election in Guam
Party	Candidate	Votes	%
Republican	George W. Bush Dick Cheney	21,490	64.08%
Democratic	John Kerry John Edwards	11,781	35.13
Independent	Ralph Nader Peter Camejo	196	0.58%
Libertarian	Michael Badnarik Richard Campagna	67	0.2%
Total votes		33,534	100.0%
Republican hold			

=== Delegate ===
Guam Delegate results
Party	Candidate	Votes	%
Democratic	Madeleine Bordallo (incumbent)	31,051	97.38
n/a	Write-ins	837	2.62
Total votes		31,888	100

=== Legislature ===
In the election to the legislature, the top fifteen vote-getters are elected, and the remaining candidates aren't. A recount was held due to the closeness of the vote counts of the critical 15th/16th candidates. As a result, Joanne Brown (Republican), an incumbent, pushed then Speaker Ben Pangelinan into 16th place with a two-vote lead.

Party	Votes	%	Seats
Republican Party	228,177	51.82	9
Democratic Party	211,904	48.13	6
Write-ins	232	0.05	–
Total	440,313	100	15
Source: Guam election

2004 Guam legislative election
Party	Candidate	Votes	%
Republican	Ray Tenorio (incumbent)	21,656	4.92
Republican	Edward J.B. Calvo	21,041	
Republican	Michael W. Cruz, M.D.	20,168	
Democratic	Benjamin J.F. Cruz	19,573	
Democratic	Frank B. Aguon Jr. (incumbent)	17,808	
Democratic	Judith T.P. Won Pat	17,411	
Republican	Robert "Bob" Klitzkie (incumbent)	16,828	
Republican	Antonio "Tony" R. Unpingco	16,391	
Republican	Lawrence F. Kasperbauer (incumbent)	16,174	
Republican	Jesse Anderson Lujan (incumbent)	15,319	
Democratic	Adolpho B. Palacios Sr.	15,257	
Republican	Mark Forbes (incumbent)	15,212	
Democratic	Rory J. Respicio (incumbent)	14,859	
Democratic	Lou Leon Guerrero (incumbent)	14,853	
Republican	Joanne M.S. Brown (incumbent)	14,618	
Democratic	Vicente "Ben" C. Pangelinan	14,614	
Democratic	Tina Muña Barnes (incumbent)	13,889	
Republican	Noel M. Silan	13,704	
Republican	Jerome T. Landstorm, M.D.	13,458	
Democratic	Judith P. Guthertz	13,366	
Democratic	Mark C. Charfaurous	13,034	
Democratic	John M. "JQ" Quinata (incumbent)	12,621	
Democratic	Vincent C. Camacho	12,445	
Democratic	Antoinette M. Sanford (incumbent)	12,118	
Democratic	Theodore "Ted" S. Nelson	11,766	
Democratic	Randall F. Cunliffe	11,488	
Republican	Vicente Anthony Gaza	10,834	
Republican	Bertha M. Duenas	10,803	
Republican	Christopher M. Duenas	9,526	
Democratic	Teresita Garrido Cruz	9,247	
Majority		2,091	
Turnout		118,689	
Republican gain from Democratic			

=== Auditor ===
Public Auditor results
Party	Candidate	Votes	%
Republican	Doris Flores-Brooks (incumbent)	30,627	98.80
n/a	Write-ins	371	1.20
Total votes		30,998	100

=== Utilities Commission ===
2018 Consolidated Commission on Utilities results
Party	Candidate	Votes	%
Nonpartisan	Thomas C. Ada	24,839	46.84%
Nonpartisan	Gloria C.B. Nelson	13,227	24.94%
Nonpartisan	Eloy P. Hara	8,146	15.36
Nonpartisan	Jesus T. Lizama	6,577	12.40
N/A	Write-ins	239	0.45
Total votes		53,028	100

=== Judicial retention ===
Both judges standing for retention kept their seats by large majorities.

=== Education board ===
Elections for the Guam Education Policy Board suffered for a shortage of candidates: Only in the district of Luchan were there more running than returned (4, including write-in, for two seats). In the other two 2 seat districts, the second had to be filled by write-in, and in the 3 seat Lagu district, NO candidates were on the ballot, resulting in a 100% write-in return.

=== Mayors ===
Ten Republican mayors were elected against four Democratic mayors and all three vice mayors. The vice mayor of Barrigada, June Blas was elected without opposition.

=== Referendum ===
Shall proposal A, an initiative to establish the Guam Casino Gaming Control Commission Act be adopted by the voters of Guam?

Choice	Votes	%
For	13,311	38.54
Against	21,223	61.46
Invalid/blank votes		–
Total	34,534	100
Registered voters/turnout	54,940	
Source: Direct Democracy
