= 28th Guam Legislature =

2005–07 meeting in the US territory

The 28th Guam Legislature was a meeting of the Guam Legislature. It convened in Hagatna, Guam on January 3, 2005 and ended on January 1, 2007, during the 3rd and 4th years of Felix P. Camacho's 1st Gubernatorial Term.

In the 2004 Guamanian general election, the Republican Party of Guam won a nine-to-six (9-6) majority of seats in the Guam Legislature.

== Party summary ==
Affiliation	Party (shading indicates majority caucus)		Total	Vacant
Affiliation	Democratic	Republican	Total	Vacant
End of previous legislature	9	6	15	0
Begin	6	9	15	0
Latest Voting share	40.0%	60.0%		
Beginning of the next legislature	7	8	15	0

== Leadership ==
=== Legislative ===
- Speaker: Mark Forbes
- Vice Speaker: Joanne M. Salas Brown
- Legislative Secretary: Edward J.B. Calvo

=== Majority (Republican) ===
- Majority Leader: Antonio R. Unpingco
- Asst. Majority Leader: Ray Tenorio

== Membership ==
Senator	Party	Assumed office
Mark Forbes	Republican	1995
Edward J.B. Calvo	Republican	2005
Ray Tenorio	Republican	2003
Antonio R. Unpingco	Republican	2005
Mike Cruz, M.D.	Republican	2005
Jesse A. Lujan	Republican	2003
Joanne M. Salas Brown	Republican	1995
Robert "Bob" Klitzkie	Republican	2003
Lawrence "Larry" Kasperbauer	Republican	1997
Judith T.P. Won Pat	Democratic	2005
Rory J. Respicio	Democratic	2003
Adolpho B. Palacios Sr.	Democratic	2005
Benjamin J.F. Cruz	Democratic	2005
Frank B. Aguon Jr.	Democratic	1997
Lourdes A. Leon Guerrero	Democratic	2001
