= 2006 Guam general election =

2006 Guam gubernatorial election
- November 7, 2006
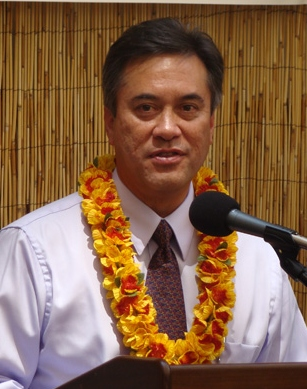

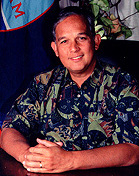
Nominee	Felix Perez Camacho	Robert Underwood
Party	Republican	Democratic
Running mate	Michael Cruz	Frank Aguon
Popular vote	19,560	18,700
Percentage	50.25%	48.04%
Governor before election
Felix Perez Camacho
Republican
Elected Governor
Felix Perez Camacho
Republican

General elections were held in Guam on November 7, 2006, in order to elect the governor, all 15 seats in the Legislature and the federal delegate. There was also a double referendum on legalise slot machines at racing tracks and raising the age at which citizens could purchase and consume alcohol to 21.

Whilst Felix Perez Camacho of the Republican Party was re-elected as governor, the Democratic Party won a majority of seats in the legislature. Madeleine Bordallo was re-elected as the territory's federal delegate, whilst both referendum questions were rejected.

== Background ==
In Guam, elections to the legislature and multi-member boards are run via open primary (This following the outlawing of the previous blanket primary similar to Louisiana.

Both the Public Auditor and Consolidated Commission on Utilities are required to be nonpartisan and as such candidates are not allowed to state affiliations or list them on the ballot.

In the case of the auditor, affiliating with a party is grounds for disqualification.

== Candidates for Governor ==
=== Democratic ===
- Former Guam Delegate Robert A. Underwood. Previously served as Congressman from January 4, 1993, until January 6, 2003.
  - Senator Frank Aguon, Jr. is Underwood's running mate.
- Former governor Carl Gutierrez. Previously served as governor for two terms from January 2, 1995, until January 6, 2003.
  - Senator Benjamin Cruz is Gutierrez running mate.

=== Republican ===
- Current governor Felix Perez Camacho.
  - Senator Michael Cruz is Camacho's running mate.
- Current lieutenant governor Kaleo Moylan.
  - Senator Francis E. Santos is Moylan's running mate.

== Legislative candidates ==
Guam legislative election, 2006
- November 7, 2006

All 15 seats of the Legislature of Guam
	Majority party	Minority party
Leader	Mark Forbes	Judith Won Pat
Party	Republican	Democratic
Leader's seat	At-large district	At-large district
Last election	9 seats	6 seats
Seats won	8	7
Seat change	▼1	▲1
Speaker before election
Mark Forbes
Republican
Elected Speaker
Mark Forbes
Republican

=== Democratic candidates ===
- Tina Muña Barnes (I)
- Jose Chargualaf
- David Ralph Duenas
- Judith P. Guthertz
- Romeo M. Hernandez
- Adolpho B. Palacios Sr. (I)
- Vicente "Ben" Pangelinan (I)
- Don Parkinson
- Rory J. Respicio (I)
- David L.G. Shimizu
- Angel R. Sablan
- Angela L.G. Santos
- Jose "Pedo" Terjale
- Judith T. Won Pat (I)

==== Defeated in primary ====
- Robert L.G. Benavente
- Ivan Borja Carbullido
- Vicente U. Garrido
- Alejandro Gay
- Sedfrey M. Linsangan
- Elwin Champaco Quitano
- Trinidad "Trini" T. Torres

=== Republican candidates ===
- Frank Blas Jr.
- Eddie Baza Calvo (I)
- Christopher M. Duenas
- Jim Espaldon
- Speaker Mark Forbes (I)
- Victor Anthony Gaza
- Frankie "Frank" Ishizaki
- Jesse Anderson Lujan (I)
- Joseph F. Mesa
- Shirley "Sam" Mabini-Souza
- Telo Teresa Taitague
- Ray Tenorio (I)
- Antonio "Tony" R. Unpingco (I)

==== Withdrew ====
- Flora Baza Quan

== Attorney General ==
Three candidates are seeking election as attorney general, Alicia Limtiaco, Douglas Moylan, and Vernon Gumataotao Perez.

== Consolidated Commission on Utilities ==
Ten candidates are seeking election as CCU will take three seats.

- Joana Margaret C. Blas
- Harold J. Cruz
- Luis A. De Vera
- Luis P. Duenas
- Eloy Perez Hara
- Benigno Manibusan Palomo (I)
- Simon A. Sanchez II (I)
- Everett D. Spidell

== Primary election ==
=== Governor ===
Democratic primary results
Party	Candidate	Votes	%
Democratic	Robert A. Underwood/Frank B. Aguon Jr.	13,421	52.94
Democratic	Carl T.C. Gutierrez/Benjamin J.F. Cruz	11,860	46.78
Total votes			

Republican primary results
Party	Candidate	Votes	%
Republican	Felix P. Camacho/Michael W. Cruz	4,950	63.22
Republican	Kaleo Moylan/Francis E. Santos	2,847	36.36
Total votes			

=== Legislature ===
2006 Guam Legislature Primary Election (Democratic Party)
Party	Candidate	Votes	%
Democratic	Judith T.P. Won Pat (incumbent)	17,155	
Democratic	Rory J. Respicio (incumbent)	15,621	
Democratic	Vicente "Ben" C. Pangelinan (incumbent)	15,187	
Democratic	Adolpho B. Palacios Sr. (incumbent)	14,836	
Democratic	David L. G. Shimizu	14,340	
Democratic	Tina Muña Barnes (incumbent)	14,018	
Democratic	Judith P. Guthertz	13,151	
Democratic	Angel Reyes Sablan	10,471	
Democratic	Jose "Pedo" Toves Terjale	10,121	
Democratic	Don Parkinson	9,718	
Democratic	David Ralph Duenas	7,861	
Democratic	Angela L.G. Santos	7,826	
Democratic	Trinidad T. Torres	7,643	
Democratic	Jose Chargualaf	7,615	
Democratic	Romeo Hernandez	7,540	
Democratic	Robert L.G. Benavente	7,346	
Democratic	Elwin Champaco Quitano	7,240	
Democratic	Vincent U. Garrido	7,146	
Democratic	Ivan Borja Carbullido	6,679	
Democratic	Sedfrey Linsangan	5,871	
Democratic	Alejandro Gay	3,765	
Democratic	Write-in candidates		
Turnout			

- Republicans did not appear on the ballot because there was no need for a Republican primary with less than 15 candidates running for legislature.

=== Attorney General ===
Attorney General (non-partisan)
Party	Candidate	Votes	%
Nonpartisan	Alicia Limtiaco	15,163	43.45
Nonpartisan	Vernon Gumataotao Perez	11,559	33.12
Nonpartisan	Douglas Moylan	8,118	23.26
Total votes			

== General Election ==
=== Gubernatorial ===
Guam gubernatorial general election results
Party	Candidate	Votes	%
Republican	Felix Perez Camacho/Michael W. Cruz	19,560	50.25
Democratic	Robert A. Underwood/Frank B. Aguon	18,700	48.04
Total votes			
Republican hold			

=== Delegate to House of Representatives ===
Guam Delegate results
Party	Candidate	Votes	%
Democratic	Madeleine Bordallo (incumbent)	32,677	96.45
Total votes		33,878	100

=== Legislature ===
Party	Votes	%	Seats
Republican Party	239,628	52.4	8
Democratic Party	215,334	47.1	7
Write-ins	2,091	0.5	–
Total	457,053	100	15
Source: Guam election

2006 Guam legislative election
Party	Candidate	Votes	%
Republican	Edward J.B. Calvo (incumbent)	26,464	
Republican	Ray Tenorio (incumbent)	26,036	
Democratic	Judith T.P. Won Pat	24,513	
Republican	Jim Espaldon	23,820	
Democratic	Rory J. Respicio (incumbent)	21,799	
Republican	Mark Forbes (incumbent)	21,506	
Democratic	Adolpho Borja Palacios Sr. (incumbent)	21,244	
Democratic	Vicente "Ben" C. Pangelinan	20,026	
Republican	Antonio "Tony" R. Unpingco (incumbent)	19,889	
Democratic	David L.G. Shimizu	18,789	
Democratic	Tina Muña Barnes (incumbent)	18,388	
Republican	Frank F. Blas Jr.	18,181	
Democratic	Frankie T. Ishizaki	18,172	
Democratic	Judith Paulette Guthertz	17,774	
Republican	Jesse "Jess" Anderson Lujan	16,449	
Republican	Telo Teresa Taitague	15,956	
Republican	Shirley "Sam" Mabini-Souza	14,707	
Republican	Christopher M. Duenas	13,744	
Republican	Joseph F. Mesa	13,145	
Democratic	Angel Reyes Sablan	11,803	
Republican	Victor Anthony Gaza	11,559	
Democratic	Don Parkinson	11,069	
Democratic	Jose "Pedo" Toves Terjale	10,445	
Democratic	Romeo M. Hernandez	8,842	
Democratic	Jose S.N. Chargualaf	8,435	
Democratic	David Ralph Duenas	8,017	
Democratic	Angela L.G. Santos	7,838	
Republican	Trinidad T. Torres	6,352	
Majority		2,091	
Turnout		118,689	
Republican hold			

=== Attorney General ===
Attorney General (non-partisan)
Party	Candidate	Votes	%
Nonpartisan	Alicia Limtiaco	21,628	56.04
Nonpartisan	Vernon Gumataotao Perez	14,444	37.42
Total votes			

=== Consolidated Commission on Utilities ===
Consolidated Commission on Utilities
Party	Candidate	Votes	%
Nonpartisan	Simon A. Sanchez II (incumbent)	21,606	24.58
Nonpartisan	Benigno M. Palomo	17,909	20.37
Nonpartisan	Eloy P. Hara	11,686	13.29
Nonpartisan	Joana Margaret C. Blas (incumbent)	8,614	9.80
Nonpartisan	Juan Cruz Tenorio	8,135	9.25
Nonpartisan	Luis P. Duenas	6,188	7.04
Nonpartisan	Harold J. Cruz	5,822	6.62
Nonpartisan	Everett Dee Spidell	4,142	4.71
Nonpartisan	Luis A. De Vera	3,621	4.12
Total votes			

=== Referendums ===
==== Raising the age for alcohol consumption ====
Shall proposal A, an initiative to raise the minimum age for consumption and purchase of alcoholic beverages to twenty-one years of age, be adopted by the voters of Guam?

Choice	Votes	%
For	16,762	49.23
Against	17,289	50.77
Invalid/blank votes	6,038	–
Total	40,089	100
Registered voters/turnout	55,311	72.48
Source: Guam election

==== Legalising slot machines ====
Shall proposal B, an initiative to legalize slot machine gambling at an established pari-mutuel racing facility in Guam and to establish a slot machine gaming tax, be adopted by the voters of Guam?

Choice	Votes	%
For	16,705	45.19
Against	20,260	54.81
Invalid/blank votes	3,124	–
Total	40,089	100
Registered voters/turnout	55,311	72.48
Source: Guam election
