= 31st Guam Legislature =

The 31st Guam Legislature was a meeting of the Guam Legislature. It convened in Hagatna, Guam on January 3, 2011 and ended on January 7, 2013, during the 1st and 2nd years of Eddie Calvo's 1st Gubernatorial Term.

In the 2010 Guamanian general election, the Democratic Party of Guam won a majority of seats in the Guam Legislature.

== Party summary ==
Affiliation	Party (shading indicates majority caucus)			Total	Vacant
Affiliation	Democratic	Independent	Republican	Total	Vacant
End of previous legislature	9	0	6	15	0
Begin (January 3, 2011)	9	0	6	15	0
Latest voting share	60.0%	0.0%	40.0%		
Beginning of the next legislature	9	0	6	15	0

== Leadership ==
=== Legislative ===
- Speaker: Judith T.P. Won Pat
- Vice Speaker: Benjamin J.F. Cruz
- Legislative Secretary: Tina Rose Muna Barnes

=== Majority (Democratic) ===
- Majority Leader: Rory J. Respicio
- Assistant Majority Leader: Judith P. Guthertz, DPA
- Majority Whip: Tina Muna Barnes

=== Minority (Republican) ===
- Minority Leader: Frank F. Blas Jr.
- Assistant Minority Leader: Aline A. Yamashita, Ph.D.
- Minority Whip: Honorable V. Anthony Ada
- Assistant Minority Whip: Mana Silva Taijeron

== Membership ==
Senator	Party	Assumed office	Residence	Born
Judith T.P. Won Pat	Democratic	2005	Inarajan	1949
Benjamin J.F. Cruz	Democratic	2008	Tumon	1951
Tina Muna Barnes	Democratic	2007	Mangilao	1962
Rory J. Respicio	Democratic	2003	Agana Heights	1973
Judith P. Guthertz, DPA	Democratic	2007	Mangilao	
Vicente C. "Ben" Pangelinan	Democratic	2007	Mangilao	1955
Thomas C. Ada	Democratic	2009	Mangilao	1949
Adolpho B. Palacios Sr.	Democratic	2005	Ordot-Chalan Pago	
Dennis G. Rodriguez Jr.	Democratic	2011	Dededo	1978
Frank F. Blas Jr.	Republican	2007		
Aline A. Yamashita	Republican	2011	Tamuning	
V. Anthony "Tony" Ada	Republican	2010		1967
Mana Silva Taijeron	Republican	2011		
Christopher M. Dueñas	Republican	2011		
Shirley "Sam" Mabini	Republican	2011		

== Committees ==
Committee	Chair	Vice Chair
Committee on Rules, Federal, Foreign & Micronesian Affairs, and Human & Natural Resources	Rory J. Respicio	Judith P. Guthertz, DPA
Committee on Education and Public Libraries	Judith T. Won Pat, Ed.D.	Vicente C. Pangelinan, Tina Muna Barnes (GCC & DOE-Interscholastic Sports), Judith P. Guthertz, DPA (UOG)
Committee on Youth, Cultural Affairs, Procurement, General Government Operations and Public Broadcasting	Benjamin J.F. Cruz	Tina Muna Barnes
Committee on Municipal Affairs, Tourism, Housing and Recreation	Tina Muna Barnes	Judith T. Won Pat, Ed.D.
Committee on the Guam Military Buildup and Homeland Security	Judith P. Guthertz, DPA	Rory J. Respicio
Committee on Utilities, Transportation, Public Works & Veterans Affairs	Thomas C. Ada	Adolpho B. Palacios Sr.
Committee on Public Safety, Law Enforcement, and Judiciary	Adolpho B. Palacios Sr.	Thomas C. Ada
Committee on Appropriations, Taxation, Public Debt, Banking, Insurance, Retirement & Land	Vicente C. "Ben" Pangelinan	Judith T. Won Pat, Ed.D.
Committee on Health and Human Services, Senior Citizens, Economic Development, and Election Reform	Dennis G. Rodriguez Jr.	Adolpho B. Palacios Sr.
