= 32nd Guam Legislature =

The 32nd Guam Legislature was a meeting of the Guam Legislature. It convened in Hagatna, Guam on January 7, 2013 and ended on January 5, 2015, during the 3rd and 4th years of Eddie Calvo's 1st Gubernatorial Term.

In the 2012 Guamanian legislative election, the Democratic Party of Guam won a majority of seats in the Guam Legislature.

== Party summary ==
Affiliation	Party (shading indicates majority caucus)			Total	Vacant
Affiliation	Democratic	Independent	Republican	Total	Vacant
End of previous legislature	9	0	6	15	0
Begin (January 7, 2013)	9	0	6	15	0
Latest voting share	60.0%	0.0%	40.0%		
Beginning of the next legislature	9	0	6	15	0

== Leadership ==
=== Legislative ===
- Speaker: Judith T.P. Won Pat
- Vice Speaker: Benjamin J.F. Cruz
- Legislative Secretary: Tina Muna Barnes

=== Majority (Democratic) ===
- Majority Leader: Rory J. Respicio
- Assistant Majority Leader: Thomas C. Ada
- Majority Whip: Dennis G. Rodriguez Jr.

=== Minority (Republican) ===
- Minority Leader: V. Anthony "Tony" Ada
- Assistant Minority Leader: Christopher M. Duenas
- Minority Whip: Thomas A. Morrison
- Assistant Minority Whip: Brant McCreadie

== Membership ==
Senator	Party	Assumed office	Residence	Born
Judith T.P. Won Pat	Democratic	2005	Inarajan	1949
Benjamin J.F. Cruz	Democratic	2008	Tumon	1951
Tina Muna Barnes	Democratic	2007	Mangilao	1962
Rory J. Respicio	Democratic	2003	Agana Heights	1973
Thomas C. Ada	Democratic	2009	Mangilao	1949
Dennis G. Rodriguez Jr.	Democratic	2011	Dededo	1978
Vicente C. "Ben" Pangelinan	Democratic	2007	Mangilao	1955
Frank Blas Aguon Jr.	Democratic	2013	Yona	1966
Michael F.Q. San Nicolas	Democratic	2013	Dededo	1981
V. Anthony "Tony" Ada	Republican	2010		1967
Christopher M. Dueñas	Republican	2011		
Thomas A. Morrison	Republican	2013	Umatac	1975
Brant McCreadie	Republican	2015		1971
Aline A. Yamashita	Republican	2011	Tamuning	
Michael Limtiaco	Republican	2013		

== Committees ==
Committee	Chair	Vice Chair
Committee on Rules, Federal, Foreign & Micronesian Affairs, Human & Natural Resources, and Election Reform	Rory J. Respicio	Thomas C. Ada
Committee on Education, Public Library and Women’s Affairs	Judith T. Won Pat, Ed.D.	Aline A. Yamashita, Ph.D.
Committee on Public Safety, Infrastructure & Maritime Transportation	Thomas C. Ada	Rory J. Respicio
Committee on Appropriations, Public Debt, Legal Affairs, Retirement, Public Parks, Recreation, Historic Preservation and Land	Vicente C. "Ben" Pangelinan	Benjamin J.F. Cruz
Committee on the Guam US Military Relocation, Homeland Security, Veteran’s Affairs and Judiciary	Frank B. Aguon, Jr.	Tina Muna Barnes
Committee on Aviation, Ground Transportation, Regulatory Concerns, and Future Generations	Michael F.Q. San Nicolas	Thomas C. Ada
Committee on Health & Human Services, Health Insurance Reform, Economic Development, and Senior Citizens	Dennis G. Rodriguez, Jr.	V. Anthony "Tony" Ada
