= 2000 Guam general election =

General elections were held in Guam in November 2000 in order to elect the Legislature, Guam's delegate to the United States House of Representatives, the Public Auditor (for the first time) and village mayor and vice-mayors.

== Campaign ==
A total of 33 candidates contested the 15 seats in the Legislature (including 13 incumbents), two ran for the Delegate position and five for the Public Auditor.

In the Legislature elections, 32 candidates were from the Democratic or Republican parties, with one running as an independent.

== Results ==
=== Legislature ===
Candidate	Party	Votes	Notes
Frank Aguon	Democratic Party		Elected
Felix P. Camacho	Republican Party		Elected
Edward J.B. Calvo	Republican Party		Elected
Judith Won Pat	Democratic Party		Elected
Ben Pangelinan	Democratic Party		Elected
Thomas C. Ada	Democratic Party		Elected
Mark Forbes	Republican Party		Elected
Mark C. Charfauros	Republican Party		Elected
Kaleo S. Moylan	Republican Party		Elected
Joseph F. Ada	Republican Party		Elected
Lourdes A. Leon Guerrero	Democratic Party		Elected
Angel L.G. Santos	Democratic Party		Elected
Antonio R. Unpingco	Republican Party		Elected
Lawrence F. Kasperbauer	Republican Party		Elected
Joanne M.S. Brown	Republican		Elected

Tom Ada received the most votes, and three women were elected.

=== Public Auditor ===
Doris Flores Brooks was elected with 51% of the vote.

=== Delegate ===
General Election Results for Delegate to the U.S. House of Representatives
Party	Candidate	Votes	%
Democratic	Robert A. Underwood (incumbent)	29,099	78.09
Republican	Manuel Q. Cruz	8,167	21.92
Total votes			100
