= 2002 Guam general election =

2002 Guam gubernatorial election
- November 5, 2002
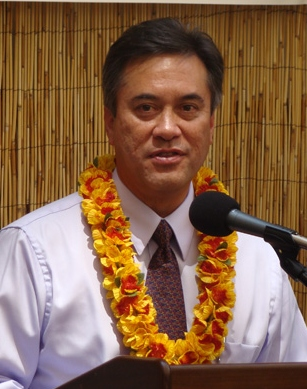

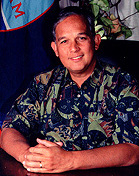
Nominee	Felix Perez Camacho	Robert Underwood
Party	Republican	Democratic
Running mate	Kaleo Moylan	Thomas C. Ada
Popular vote	24,309	19,559
Percentage	55.41%	44.59%
Governor before election
Carl Gutierrez
Democratic
Elected Governor
Felix Perez Camacho
Republican

General elections were held in Guam on November 5, 2002, in order to elect the governor, all 15 members of the Legislature and the Federal delegate to the US Congress. There was also a referendum on raising the age at which alcohol could be bought and consumed to 21. The proposal was rejected by voters.

== Background ==
The elections to the Legislature and multi-member boards were run via open primary (This following the outlawing of the previous blanket primary) similar to Louisiana.

Both the Public Auditor and Consolidated Commission on Utilities were required to be nonpartisan and as such candidates were not allowed to state affiliations or list them on the ballot. In the case of the Auditor, affiliating with a party is grounds for disqualification.

== Democratic Party ==
- Robert A. Underwood, U.S. Delegate Congressman
  - Thomas C. Ada, Senator
- Carl Gutierrez (incumbent), Governor of Guam
  - Maj. Gen. Benny Paulino, U.S. Soldier of the Guam National Guard

== Republican Party ==
- Felix Perez Camacho, Senator
  - Kaleo Moylan, Senator
- Antonio Unpingco, Senator/Speaker of the Guam Legislature
  - Eddie Calvo, Senator

== Results ==
=== Governor ===
==== Republican gubernatorial primary ====
Republican primary results
Party	Candidate	Votes	%
Republican	Felix P. Camacho/Kaleo S. Moylan	1	
Republican	Antonio R. Unpingco/Edward J.B. Calvo	0	
Total votes			

==== Democratic gubernatorial primary ====
Democratic primary results
Party	Candidate	Votes	%
Democratic	Robert A. Underwood/Thomas C. Ada	1	
Democratic	Carl T.C. Gutierrez/Benny Paulino	0	
Total votes			

==== General Election ====
Guam gubernatorial general election results
Party	Candidate	Votes	%
Republican	Felix P. Camacho/Kaleo S. Moylan	24,309	55.41
Democratic	Robert A. Underwood/Thomas C. Ada	19,559	44.59
Total votes		43,868	100
Republican gain from Democratic			

=== Delegate ===
==== Democratic primary ====
Democratic primary results
Party	Candidate	Votes	%
Democratic	Madeleine Bordallo	17,845	59.20
Democratic	Judith T. Won Pat	12,298	40.80

==== General Election ====
General Election Results for Delegate to the U.S. House of Representatives
Party	Candidate	Votes	%
Democratic	Madeleine Bordallo	27,081	63.60
Republican	Joseph F. Ada	14,836	34.84
Total votes			100

=== Guam Legislature ===
2002 Guam legislative election
- November 5, 2002

All 15 seats of the Legislature of Guam
	Majority party	Minority party
Leader	Ben Pangelinan	Tony Unpingco (retired)
Party	Democratic	Republican
Leader's seat	At-large district	At-large district
Last election	6 seats	9 seats
Seats won	9	6
Seat change	▲2	▼2
Speaker before election
Tony Unpingco
Republican
Elected Speaker
Ben Pangelinan
Democratic

Party	Votes	%	Seats
Democratic Party			9
Republican Party			6
Write-ins			–
Total	N/A	100	15
Source: Guam election

Candidate	Party	Votes	Notes
Frank Aguon	Democratic Party		Elected
Ray Tenorio	Republican Party		Elected
F. Randall Cunliffe	Democratic Party		Elected
Ben Pangelinan	Democratic Party		Elected
Carmen Fernandez	Democratic Party		Elected
Mark Forbes	Republican Party		Elected
Larry F. Kasperbauer	Republican Party		Elected
John M. Quinata	Democratic Party		Elected
Lourdes A. Leon Guerrero	Democratic Party		Elected
Rory J. Respicio	Democratic Party		Elected
Joanne M. Brown	Republican Party		Elected
Jesse A. Lujan	Republican Party		Elected
Tina Muna Barnes	Democratic Party		Elected
Robert Kiltzkie	Republican Party		Elected
Antoinette Sanford	Democratic Party		Elected

=== Referendum ===
Choice	Votes	%
For	19,436	46.27
Against	22,563	53.73
Invalid/blank votes		–
Total	41,999	100
Registered voters/turnout		
Source: Direct Democracy
