= January 2008 Guamanian gambling referendum =

Guamanian ballot measure

5 January 2008
- Shall proposal "A", an initiative to: (A) legalize casino gambling at Guam Greyhound ("casino facility"), and; (B) require the casino facility to develop, construct, and operate a convention and event center in Guam; and; (C) direct that tax proceeds from the casino gaming gross receipts and license fees be distributed towards funding of health care, education, public safety, addictive behavior counseling, and gambling regulation; and; (D) exempt Guam from select provisions of 15 U.S.C. §1171-1177 (the "Johnson Act") prohibiting gambling devices in interstate and foreign commerce?

Results
Choice	Votes	%
Yes	7,774	36.96%
No	13,259	63.04%
Valid votes	21,033	96.35%
Invalid or blank votes	797	3.65%
Total votes	21,830	100.00%
Registered voters/turnout	48,008	45.47%

A referendum on legalising slot machines at greyhound racetracks was held in Guam on 5 January 2008. The proposal was rejected by 63% of voters.

== Background ==
The proposal was introduced as part of the Better Jobs for Guam Act, but was rejected by 55% of voters in a 2006 referendum. A petition was launched after the referendum, and enough signatures were gathered between 4 December 2006 and 16 April 2007 to force another referendum. The referendum was initially scheduled for 15 December 2007, but was later moved to January 2008 by a court.

== Results ==
Choice	Votes	%
For	7,774	36.96
Against	13,259	63.04
Total	21,033	100.00
Valid votes	21,033	99.07
Invalid/blank votes	197	0.93
Total votes	21,230	100.00
Registered voters/turnout	48,008	44.22
Source: Direct Democracy
