= Senator Won Pat =

Senator Won Pat may refer to:

- Antonio Borja Won Pat (1908–1987), Senate of Guam
- Judith Won Pat (born 1949), Senate of Guam
