= 2010 Guamanian gubernatorial election =

2010 Guam gubernatorial election
- November 2, 2010
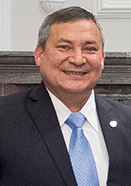

Nominee	Eddie Calvo	Carl Gutierrez
Party	Republican	Democratic
Running mate	Ray Tenorio	Frank B. Aguon Jr.
Popular vote	20,066	19,579
Percentage	50.61%	49.39%
Governor before election
Felix Perez Camacho
Republican
Elected Governor
Eddie Calvo
Republican

The 2010 Guam gubernatorial election was held on November 2, 2010. Incumbent Republican Governor Felix P. Camacho was term-limited and has ineligible for running for a third-consecutive term. In January 2009, the website D.C.'s Political Report predicted that the Republican Party would retain the governorship. Republican Eddie Calvo won the election, although it remains the closest gubernatorial election in Guamanian history.

The primaries were held on September 4, 2010.

== Democratic primary ==
This is the first gubernatorial election in 40 years in which there was no contested Democratic primary election.

=== Declared ===
- Former Governor Carl Gutierrez Previously served as governor for two terms from January 2, 1995, until January 6, 2003.
  - Senator Frank Aguon is Gutierrez's running mate. Previously ran for Lt. Governor as the running mate of gubernatorial candidate Robert Underwood in the 2006 election.

=== Declined ===
- Attorney Mike Phillips
- Amanda L.G. Santos - Mother of the late politician and Chamorro activist Senator Angel Santos. Withdrew to run for a Senate seat in the Legislature of Guam.
  - Dr. Vince Akimoto – Santos' announced running mate before their ticket withdrew from the gubernatorial race.
- Robert A. Underwood – former delegate to the U.S. House of Representatives and current president of the University of Guam.

Democratic Party of Guam primary results
Party	Candidate	Votes	%
Democratic	Carl T.C. Gutierrez/Frank B. Aguon Jr.	8,140	100
Total votes		8,140	100

== Republican primary ==
=== Declared ===
- Senator Eddie B. Calvo, officially announced team candidacy on July 16, 2009.
  - Senator Ray Tenorio is Calvo's running mate.

=== Defeated in primary ===
- Lieutenant Governor Michael W. Cruz
  - Senator James Espaldon was Cruz's running mate.

=== Results ===
Republican Party of Guam primary results
Party	Candidate	Votes	%
Republican	Edward J.B. Calvo/Raymond S. Tenorio	9,221	58.78
Republican	Michael W. Cruz/James Espaldon	6,458	41.17
Total votes			

== General election results ==
2010 Guam gubernatorial election
Party	Candidate	Votes	%
Republican	Edward J.B. Calvo/Raymond S. Tenorio	20,066	50.61
Democratic	Carl T.C. Gutierrez/Frank B. Aguon Jr.	19,579	49.39
Total votes			
Republican hold			
