= Francis E. Santos =

Guam politician

Francis Santos

Superintendent of the Guam Department of Education
- Acting
- In office July 16, 2022 – January 2023
- Governor: Lou Leon Guerrero
- Preceded by: Jon Fernandez
- Succeeded by: Kenneth Erik Swanson

Member of the Guam Consolidated Commission on Utilities
- Incumbent
- Assumed office January 1, 2015
- Governor: Eddie Calvo; Lou Leon Guerrero

Member of the Guam Legislature
- In office October 1993 – January 4, 1999
- Preceded by: Frank Santos

Personal details
- Born: Francis Edward Borja Santos
- Party: Democratic (before 2005, 2007–present); Republican (2005–2007)
- Relatives: Frank Santos (father)
- Education: Seattle University (BS); Loma Linda University (MBA)

Francis Edward Borja Santos is a Guamanian businessman, educator and former politician who currently works as the vice-chairman and chair of Finance Committee of Consolidated Commission on Utilities since 2019. A member of the Democratic Party, where he served as a senator in the 22nd, 23rd, and 24th Guam Legislatures. He ran unsuccessfully for the Republican nomination for Lieutenant Governor of Guam in 2006.

== Early life and family ==
Francis E. Santos is the son of the late Guam senator Francisco R. Santos.

Santos graduated from Father Duenas Memorial School in 1975. Santos earned a BS in business management from Seattle University and an MBA from Loma Linda University.

== Guam Legislature ==
=== Elections ===
Santos was elected in a special election held on October 3, 1993, to fill the seat of his father, Francisco R. Santos, who died. He served the remaining term of the 22nd Guam Legislature and was reelected to the 23rd and 24th Guam Legislatures.

=== Moylan-Santos campaign (2006) ===
Santos was the running mate of Republican Gubernatorial candidate Lieutenant Governor Kaleo Moylan for the 2006 gubernatorial election. The Moylan-Santos team faced the incumbent governor Felix Perez Camacho and Senator Dr. Michael Cruz. The Moylan-Santos team lost in the primary election on September 2, 2006.

== Career after the Guam Legislature ==
Santos was the former plan administrator of the StayWell Health Plan. Santos was president and CEO of the Island Home Insurance Company.

Santos was the chief financial officer of the Guam Regional Medical City from 2015 to 2016 and currently serves as the senior vice-president of strategic planning and business development for the Guam Regional Medical City. Santos is chairman of the board at the iLearn Academy Charter School. Santos is chairman of the board and member/director of Global Health Systems.

=== Election to the Consolidated Commission on Utilities ===
Santos was reelected to the Consolidated Commission on Utilities in 2018 Guam General Election. Santos was sworn in on January 10, 2019.

== Electoral history ==
Election Year	Guam Legislature	Primary Placement	General Placement	Result	Party
1993 Special Election	22nd Guam Legislature	None	1	Elected	Democratic
1994	23rd Guam Legislature	12	15	Elected	Democratic
1996	24th Guam Legislature	9	18	Elected	Democratic

2006 Guamanian gubernatorial Republican primary
Party	Candidate	Votes	%
Republican	Felix Perez Camacho/Michael W. Cruz	4,950	63.22
Republican	Kaleo S. Moylan/Francis E. Santos	2,847	36.36
Total votes			

2014 Consolidated Commission on Utilities results
Party	Candidate	Votes	%
Nonpartisan	Simon A. Sanchez II (incumbent)	17,570	20.86
Nonpartisan	Francis E. Santos	9,754	11.58
Nonpartisan	Joseph George Bamba	8,741	10.38
Nonpartisan	Benigno M. Palomo (incumbent)	8,241	9.78
Nonpartisan	William Hagen	8,178	9.71
Nonpartisan	Eloy P. Hara (incumbent)	7,367	8.75
Nonpartisan	Andrew S. Leon Guerrero	7,255	8.61
Nonpartisan	William M. Payne	4,841	5.75
Nonpartisan	Earl J. Garrido	4,722	5.61
Nonpartisan	Jose S. Servino	4,136	4.91
Nonpartisan	Fredrick P.Q. Tupaz	3,366	4.00
Total votes		84,229	100

2018 Consolidated Commission on Utilities results
Party	Candidate	Votes	%
Nonpartisan	Simon A. Sanchez II (incumbent)	19,827	
Nonpartisan	Michael Troy Limtiaco	16,829	
Nonpartisan	Francis E. Santos (incumbent)	14,816	
Nonpartisan	William D. Parkinson	12,554	

Government offices
Preceded by Jon Fernandez	Superintendent of the Guam Department of Education; Acting; 2022–2023	Succeeded by Kenneth Erik Swanson
