= Telo T. Taitague =

Guamanian musician, businesswoman and politician

- Taitague in 2025

Member of the Guam Legislature
- Incumbent
- Assumed office January 7, 2019
- In office January 5, 2009 – January 3, 2011

Personal details
- Born: Telo Teresa Taitague
- Party: Republican
- Children: 2
- Education: Fayetteville Technical Community College; University of Guam
- Other names: Telo Taitague, Telo Teresa Taitague

Telo Teresa Taitague is a Guamanian musician, businesswoman and politician serving as a Republican senator in the Guam Legislature.

== Early life ==
Taitague was born to Jose Quinene Lizama Taitague and Joyce Frances Schonsby, and is one of five children. In 1978, Taitague graduated from George Washington High School in Mangilao, Guam. She also attended the Fayetteville Technical Community College and the University of Guam.

== Career ==
Taitague is a professional musician. Taitague is a certified insurance agent. As a businesswoman, Taitague established Telephoto Portraits and The Graudate, Inc.

On November 7, 2006, Taitague lost the election for a seat as senator in the Guam Legislature. Taitague received 3.51% of the votes.

On November 4, 2008, Taitague won the election and became a Republican senator in the Guam Legislature. Taitague served her first term on January 5, 2009 in the 30th Guam Legislature. Taitague was also elected as the Assistant Minority Whip.

In February 2015, Taitague was selected as the Deputy General Manager of Guam Visitors Bureau.

On November 6, 2018, Taitague won the election and became a Republican senator in the Guam Legislature. Taitague served her second term on January 7, 2019 in the 35th Guam Legislature.

On November 3, 2020, Taitague a won the election and continued serving as a senator in the Guam Legislature. Taitague served her third term on January 4, 2021 in the 36th Guam Legislature.

== Personal life ==
Taitague has two children.
