= Nerissa Bretania Underwood =

Guamanian politician

Senator of the Guam Legislature
- In office January 5, 2015 – January 2, 2017

Superintendent of the Guam Department of Education
- In office 2007–2011
- Governor: Felix Perez Camacho
- Preceded by: Juan Flores
- Succeeded by: Jon Fernandez

Personal details
- Born: Nerissa Bretania; 1955 (age 70–71) Iloilo, Philippines
- Party: Democratic
- Spouse(s): Shafer (divorced) Robert A. Underwood (m. 2009)
- Children: 3
- Education: University of Guam (BA); University of Oregon (MS, PhD)

Nerissa Bretania Underwood (née Bretania; born 1955) is a Guamanian politician who served as the senator in Guam Legislature, also former vice chairwoman of the Democratic Party of Guam, a former superintendent of the Guam Department of Education, and the wife of former Democratic Guam Congressional Delegate Robert A. Underwood. She is previously serving as the chairperson of the legislature's Committee on Early Learning, Juvenile Justice, Public Education and First Generation Initiatives and as the vice chairperson on the Committee on Higher Education, Culture, Public Libraries, and Women's Affairs.

== Early life and education ==
Nerissa Bretania was born in Iloilo, Philippines, and emigrated to Guam with her parents when she was in her early childhood. Her parents are Mike "Ismael" Buenaflor Bretania (1929–2017) (a Navy contractor) and Rosalina Bretania (a school teacher) spoke Ilonggo with Bretania and her siblings at home.

Growing up on Guam, Bretania lived in the villages of Agat and Santa Rita. She attended Mount Carmel School and Notre Dame High School. She graduated from Forest Ridge School of the Sacred Heart in Washington in 1973.

Bretania attained her Bachelor of Arts in education from the University of Guam in 1981.

== Professional educator ==
After graduation from the University of Guam, Bretania worked as a special education teacher with the Guam Department of Education at Harry S Truman Elementary School. She became a consulting resource teacher for the Guam Department of Education's Division of Special Education. In 1985, she earned a Master of Science degree in education from the University of Oregon. In 1989, she attained a PhD in education from the University of Oregon.

After she returned to Guam in 1990, she became an assistant professor at the University of Guam. She became a program evaluator for the Division of Special Education at the Guam Department of Education. In 1993, she became the Administrator of the Guam Department of Education's Research, Planning, and Evaluation Division, which provides data for educators and policy makers. In 2003, Bretania served as Interim Superintendent for the Guam Department of Education and in 2007 was chosen to serve as the Assistant Superintendent of Education. In 2008, Bretania was appointed by the Guam Board of Education as Superintendent of the Guam Department of Education. In 2009, she married retired Congressman Robert A. Underwood in a private civil ceremony at the Superior Court of Guam. She retired from the Guam Department of Education in 2011, after serving as an educator for over 30 years. Her term as superintendent saw the graduation rate steady rise to 68%, saw opportunities for advanced studies advance, with the pilot Dual Enrollment Program, and rises in test scores, including the achievement of first graders at F.Q. Sanchez, Wettengel, Merizo, B.P. Carbullido, Lyndon B. Johnson, and Inarajan Elementary Schools scoring at the 90th percentile in reading and John F. Kennedy High School students scoring at the national average in science and social studies.

== Political career ==
In November 2014, Underwood was elected as a Democratic Senator to the 33rd Guam Legislature. Her campaign slogan was "Equal Opportunity and Fair Treatment = Success for Guam". On June 5, 2015, Underwood introduced Bill 119–33, The Guam Marriage Equality Act of 2015. Underwood also introduced Bill B243-33 in January 2016 for Guamanian Senators to voluntarily reduce their salaries.

== Public life ==
Outside of her service in government, Underwood has been active in organizations, including the Filipino Community of Guam, the Iloilo Association of Guam, the American Red Cross, the Guam Humanities Council, the St. Paul Christian School Board, and the Guam Women's Club.

Preceded by Juan Flores	Superintendent of the Guam Department of Education; Acting; 2007–2011	Succeeded by Jon Fernandez
