= Dave Shimizu =

American politician

David L.G. Shimizu

Vice Speaker of the Guam Legislature
- In office March 7, 2008 – January 5, 2009
- Preceded by: Eddie Calvo
- Succeeded by: Benjamin J.F. Cruz

Member of the Guam Legislature
- In office January 1, 2007 – January 5, 2009
- In office January 7, 1991 – January 2, 1995

Personal details
- Born: David Leon Guerrero Shimizu
- Party: Democratic
- Spouse: Florence M.P. Shimizu
- Education: BA, University of Guam; MA in Education University of Guam; Ed.D. University of Massachusetts Amherst

David Leon Guerrero Shimizu is a Guamanian politician and businessman who served as three term senator of the Guam Legislature from 1991 to 1995 and again from 2007 to 2009, then he also served as the vice-speaker from 2008 to 2009. He is a member of the Democratic Party of Guam.

== Education ==
Shimizu earned a Bachelor of Arts and Master of Arts in education from the University of Guam. Shimizu earned a Doctor of Education degree from the University of Massachusetts.

== Guam Legislature ==
Shimizu was first elected in 1990 to and won reelection in 1992 to the Guam Legislature. Shimizu was not reelected in 1994, but was able to return to the Guam Legislature for a single term after the election of 2006.

=== Elections ===
| Election | Guam Legislature | Primary Placement | General Placement | Result |
|---|---|---|---|---|
| 1990 | 21st Guam Legislature | 13 | 17 | Elected |
| 1992 | 22nd Guam Legislature | No primary election | 14 | Elected |
| 1994 | 23rd Guam Legislature | 10 | 26 | Not elected |
| 2006 | 29th Guam Legislature | 5 | 10 | Elected |
| 2008 | 30th Guam Legislature | 8 | 16 | Not elected |
