= Public Auditor of Guam =

The Public Auditor of Guam is an elected territorial office independent of the legislative, executive, and judicial branches of the Government of Guam. Five individuals have held the office of Public Auditor since its creation in 1994. The incumbent is Benjamin Cruz.

== Election and term of office ==
The auditor was initially appointed to a six-year term by the governor after a commission recommended at least three candidates, and then be subject to a retention vote by voters (similar to judges). Neither appointed auditor served long enough to face a retention election. In 1999, legislation changed the office to a nonpartisan election with four-year terms and no term limits.

== Powers and duties ==
The Public Auditor heads Guam's Office of Public Accountability, which is tasked with promoting effective management of public resources through audits of territorial agencies and local governments and administration of procurement appeals. The Public Auditor is also responsible for:

1. maintaining a government ethics training program for elected and appointed public officials;
2. operating a hotline for investigating citizen concerns and whistleblower complaints of fraud and abuse of power; and
3. publishing meeting agendas and approved minutes prepared by territorial agencies, boards, commissions, and public corporations.

== History ==
The position of Public Auditor was established in 1992 and was originally appointed. In 2000, Doris Flores Brooks became the first Public Auditor elected.

=== List of Public Auditors (1994–present) ===
Appointed auditors

Name	Start	End
Robert Cruz	1994	1998
Sonny Shelton	1998	January 1, 2001

Elected auditors

Name	Start	End	Party Officially Nonpartisan
Doris Brooks	January 1, 2001	June 8, 2018	Republican
Yukari Hechanova; Acting	June 8, 2018	September 13, 2018	Republican
Benjamin Cruz	September 13, 2018	present	Democratic

== See also ==
- State auditor
- Politics of Guam
