= Robert A. Underwood =

American politician (born 1948)

Robert Underwood
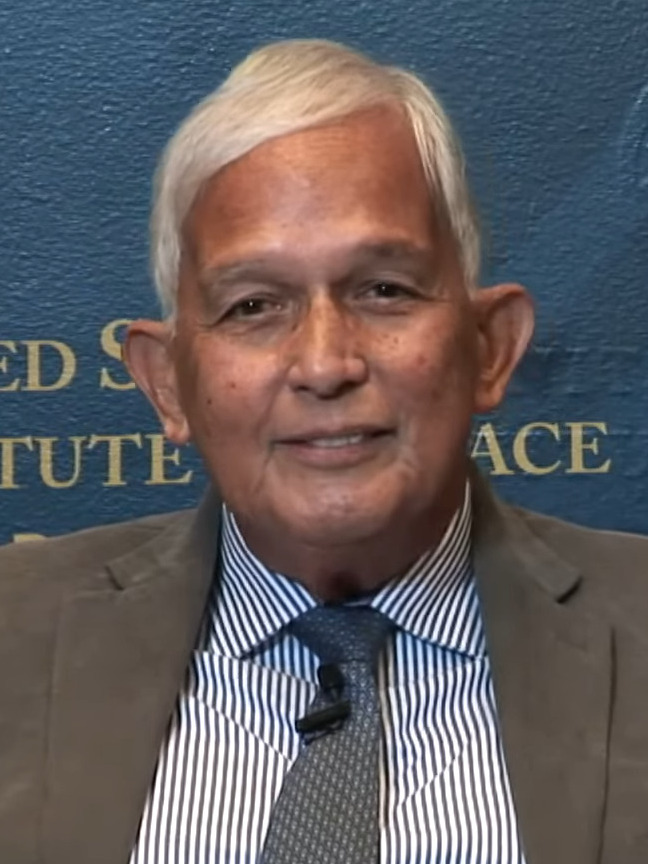
- Underwood in 2022

President of the University of Guam
- In office May 21, 2008 – August 5, 2018
- Preceded by: Harold Allen
- Succeeded by: Thomas W. Krise

Delegate to the U.S. House of Representatives from Guam's at-large district
- In office January 3, 1993 – January 3, 2003
- Preceded by: Ben Blaz
- Succeeded by: Madeleine Bordallo

Personal details
- Born: Robert Anacletus Underwood; July 13, 1948 (age 78) Tamuning, Guam, U.S.
- Party: Democratic
- Spouses: Lorraine Aguilar (divorced); Nerissa Bretania (m. 2009)
- Children: 5
- Education: California State University, Los Angeles (BA, MA); University of Southern California (EdD)

Robert Anacletus Underwood (born July 13, 1948) is an American politician and educator who served as the delegate from Guam to the United States House of Representatives from 1993 to 2003 as a member of the Democratic Party. He subsequently served as the president of the University of Guam from 2008 to 2018 and is currently a co-chair of the United States Institute of Peace China-Freely Associated States Senior Study Group.

== Early life ==
Underwood was born in Tamuning, Guam. He is the son of John Joseph Underwood (1911–1986) and Esther Flores Taitano (1913–2005). His paternal grandparents were James Holland Underwood and Ana Pangelinan Martinez, from Tamuning, Guam, and his maternal grandparents were Juan San Nicolas Taitano and Rosario Sablan Flores, who resided in Dededo, Guam. Underwood graduated from Guam's John F. Kennedy High School in 1965, and attended California State University, Los Angeles and the University of Southern California. He became a high school teacher on the American mainland, and he then served as an instructor at the University of Guam from 1976 to 1983. Underwood was director of bilingual education assistance for Micronesia until 1988 and Academic Vice President of the University of Guam until 1992.

In 2009, he married former Guam Department of Education superintendent Dr. Nerissa Bretania Underwood during an intimate morning ceremony at the Superior Court of Guam. His wife is a former senator in Guam Legislature. Underwood is a regular opinion contributor in the Pacific Daily News.

== Guam Delegate (1993–2003) ==
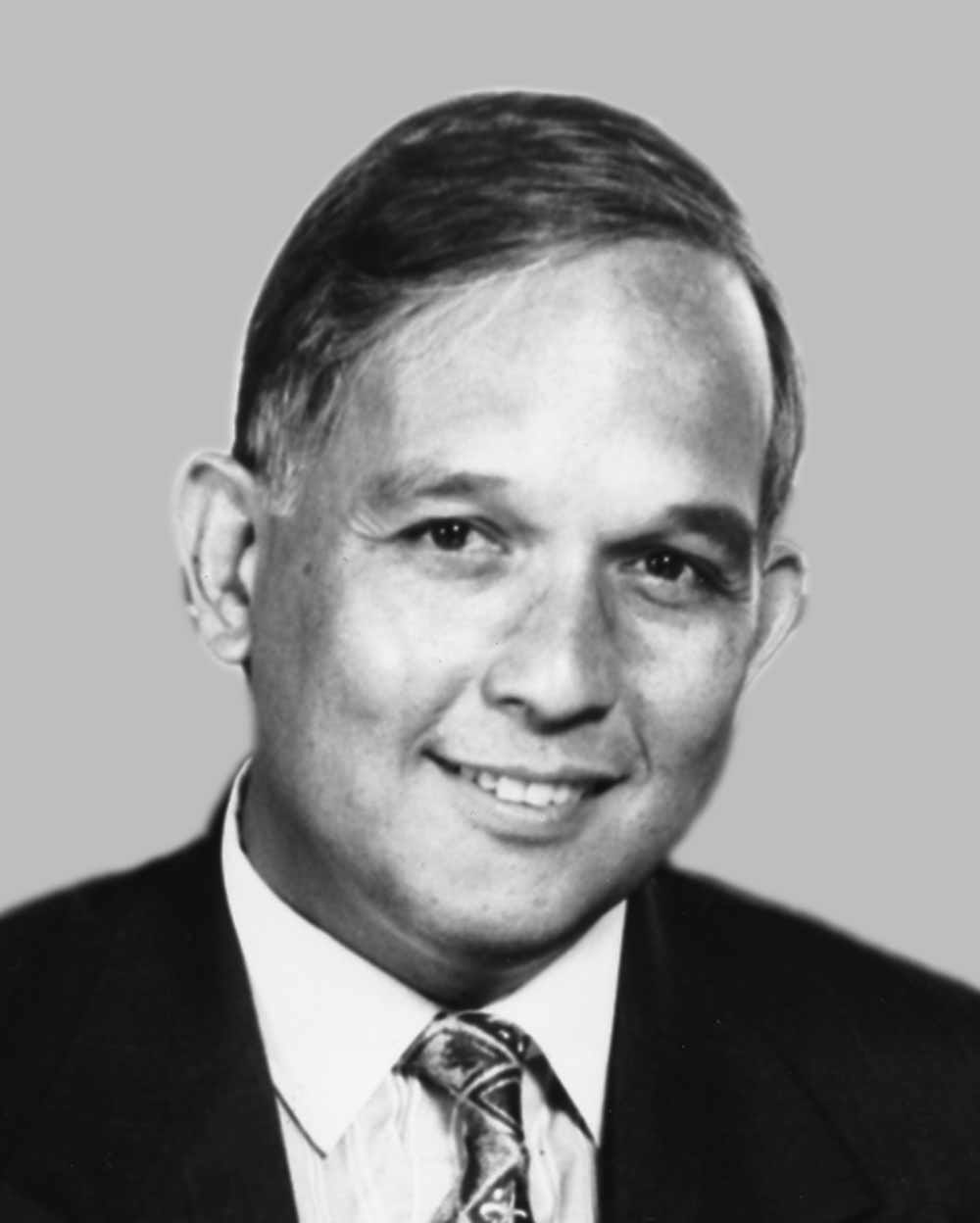
Photograph for the 105th U.S. Congress, 1997

Underwood served as the Guam Delegate to the US Congress in the 103rd through 107th Congresses from January 3, 1993 to January 3, 2003 during which he sponsored major legislation for Guam, played an active role in US Department of Defense authorization bills and was an advocate for political development for insular areas and the extension of educational and social opportunities for Asian Americans and Pacific Islanders. During his tenure in congress, he became a senior member of both the House Armed Services and Resources committees. He emphasized the importance of Guam and the Asian Pacific region in national strategic policy and worked to enhance the benefits of military personnel, especially those in guard and reserve units.

He passed major legislation for Guam that resolved long standing land disputes with the federal government, brought recognition to Guam's World War II generation and their case for war claims and enhanced local autonomy. Additionally, he built a successful record of bringing in federal funds for military construction, assistance to the government of Guam due to in-migration from surrounding islands and for several education programs.

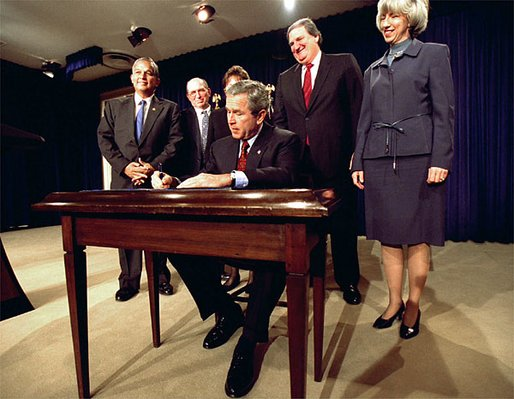
Underwood (far left) stands by President George W. Bush and other dignitaries for the signing of a bill.

Underwood ensured Guam's inclusion in major legislation such as the Telecommunications Act of 1996 that brought domestic telephone rates to Pacific territories, the State Children's Health Insurance Program and the bill that established the Department of Homeland Security. He brought recognition to Guam's unique people by lifting the ban on betel nut (pugua) importation into the US Customs Zone, inclusion in the National World War II Memorial, the creation of Chamorro Standard Time (CST) and participation in national commemorative events.

As a member of the Hispanic and Asian Pacific American Caucuses, he spoke out for the protection of immigrant rights, educational opportunities and sensitivity to language issues. As chairman of the Congressional Asian Pacific American Caucus in the 106th Congress, he led the effort to include Asian Pacific Americans in scholarship programs, was instrumental in the development of the White House Initiative on Asian Americans and Pacific Islanders, spoke out against racial profiling and for including Pacific Islanders as a demographic category in federal programs.

== 2002 gubernatorial campaign ==
Underwood declared his candidacy for the 2002 gubernatorial election and was a candidate in the November 2002 General election. His running mate for Lt. Governor was Senator Thomas "Tom" Ada. Underwood was defeated by Felix Perez Camacho in the general election on November 3, 2002.

== 2006 gubernatorial campaign ==
Underwood ran again as a Democrat for Governor of Guam in 2006, with running mate Frank Aguon for Lieutenant Governor. The Underwood-Aguon team faced former governor Carl Gutierrez and Senator Benjamin Cruz. He defeated his main Democratic rival, for the Gutierrez-Cruz team in the primary election on September 2, 2006. But on November 7, 2006 he was defeated during the general elections when incumbent Republican Governor Felix Perez Camacho, along with his new running mate Lt. Governor-elect Dr. Michael Cruz, was reelected with 50% to 48%.

== UOG president (2008–2018) ==
In 2008, Underwood was selected to begin a 5-year term as the tenth president of the University of Guam and has continued to hold this position as of 2016. In June 2018, Underwood retired as President of the University of Guam and was succeeded by Thomas W. Krise.

== 2020 congressional election ==
On June 30, 2020, Underwood announced he was running for Guam Delegate to the U.S. House of Representatives against incumbent Michael San Nicolas. In 2020, San Nicolas was re-elected. Due to the COVID-19 pandemic, Guam cancelled party primaries and all qualified candidates appeared on the November 3 general election ballot. San Nicolas came in first in a three-way race against Underwood and Republican territorial senator Wil Castro, but did not win an outright majority. In the November 17 runoff, San Nicolas defeated Underwood earning more than 59% of the vote.

== Electoral history ==
Guam Delegate to the United States House of Representatives election, November 3, 1992
Party	Candidate	Votes	%
Democratic	Robert A. Underwood	18,462	55.3%
Republican	Ben Garrido Blaz (Incumbent)	14,921	44.7%
Total votes		33,383	100.00%
Democratic gain from Republican			

Guam Delegate to the United States House of Representatives election, November 8, 1994
Party	Candidate	Votes	%
Democratic	Robert A. Underwood (Incumbent)	36,379	100.00%
Total votes		36,379	100.00%
Democratic hold			

Guam Delegate to the United States House of Representatives election, November 5, 1996
Party	Candidate	Votes	%
Democratic	Robert A. Underwood (Incumbent)	34,395	100.00%
Total votes		34,395	100.00%
Democratic hold			

Guam Delegate to the United States House of Representatives election, November 3, 1998
Party	Candidate	Votes	%
Democratic	Robert A. Underwood (Incumbent)	34,179	76.1%
Republican	Manuel Q. Cruz	10,763	23.9%
Total votes		44,942	100.00%
Democratic hold			

Guam Delegate to the United States House of Representatives election, November 7, 2000
Party	Candidate	Votes	%
Democratic	Robert A. Underwood (Incumbent)	29,099	78.1%
Republican	Manuel Cruz	8,167	21.9%
Total votes		37,266	100.00%
Democratic hold			

2020 Guam Delegate general election results
Party	Candidate	Votes	%
Democratic	Michael San Nicolas (incumbent)	13,000	45.95
Democratic	Robert A. Underwood	9,300	32.87
Republican	Wil Castro	5,942	21.00
Write-in		51	0.18
Total votes		28,293	100.00

2020 Guam Delegate election runoff results
Party	Candidate	Votes	%
Democratic	Michael San Nicolas (incumbent)	10,467	59.62
Democratic	Robert A. Underwood	7,090	40.38
—	Overvotes	5	.03
—	Undervotes	28	.16
Total votes		17,355	100.00

== See also ==
- List of Asian Americans and Pacific Islands Americans in the United States Congress

U.S. House of Representatives
Preceded by Ben Blaz	Delegate to the U.S. House of Representatives from Guam's at-large congressional district 1993–2003	Succeeded by Madeleine Bordallo
Preceded by Patsy Mink	Chair of the Congressional Asian Pacific American Caucus; 1997–2001	Succeeded by David Wu
Party political offices
Preceded by Carl Gutierrez	Democratic nominee for Governor of Guam; 2002, 2006	Succeeded by Carl Gutierrez
Academic offices
Preceded by Harold Allen	President of the University of Guam; 2008–2018	Succeeded by Thomas W. Krise
