= Aline A. Yamashita =

Guamanian educator and politician

Senator of the Guam Legislature
- In office January 3, 2011 – January 5, 2015

Personal details
- Born: Guam
- Party: Republican
- Parents: Antonio C. Yamashita (1930-1992) (father); Lorraine C. Yamashita (mother)
- Education: Simmons College, University of Guam
- Occupation: Educator, Politician
- Other name: Aline Yamashita

Aline A. Yamashita is a Guamanian educator and politician. Yamashita is a former Republican senator in the Guam Legislature from 2011 to 2015.

== Early life ==
Yamashita was born in Guam. Yamashita's father was Antonio C. Yamashita, an educator and former President of University of Guam. Yamashita's mother was Lorraine C. Yamashita, a professor at University of Guam. Yamashita has a sister Velma Yamashita.

== Education ==
In 1978, Yamashita earned a Bachelor of Arts degree in human services and early childhood education from Simmons College in Boston, Massachusetts. In 1981, Yamashita earned a Master of Education degree from University of Guam. In 1985, Yamashita earned a PhD in human development, with minors in education and early childhood education from Oregon State University.

== Career ==
Yamashita is a teacher.

Yamashita is a former assistant professor at the University of Guam's College of Education and a former adjunct professor at the University of Portland.

On November 2, 2010, Yamashita won the election and became a Republican senator in the Guam Legislature. Yamashita served her first term on January 3, 2011, in the 31st Guam Legislature. Yamashita was also an Assistant Minority Leader. On November 6, 2012, as an incumbent, Yamashita won the election and served her second term on January 7, 2013, in the 32nd Guam Legislature, until January 5, 2015.

On November 4, 2014, as an incumbent, Yamashita lost the election for a seat as a senator in the Guam Legislature.

== Personal life ==
Yamashita has two sons. Yamashita lives in Tamuning, Guam.
