= Frank Aguon =

Guamanian politician (born 1966)

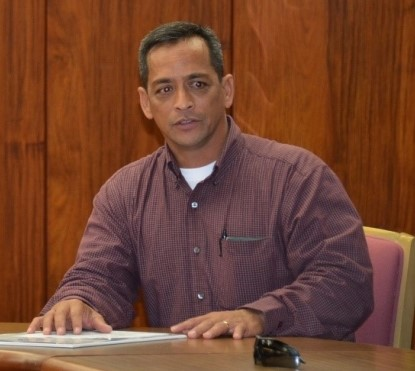

Vice Speaker of the Guam Legislature
- In office January 6, 2003 – January 3, 2005
- Preceded by: Lawrence Kasperbauer
- Succeeded by: Joanne M. Brown

Member of the Guam Legislature
- In office January 7, 2013 – January 7, 2019
- In office January 5, 2009 – January 3, 2011
- In office January 6, 1997 – January 1, 2007

Personal details
- Born: Frank Blas Aguon Jr. June 21, 1966 (age 60) Guam, U.S.
- Party: Democratic
- Spouse: Jennifer Uncangco Lujan
- Children: 4
- Education: University of Denver (BA, MBA)

Frank Blas Aguon Jr. (born June 21, 1966) is a Guamanian politician and army lieutenant. A Democrat, he served in the Legislature of Guam from 1997 to 2007, 2009 to 2011 and from 2013 to 2019. He is a former vice-speaker, serving from 2003 to 2005.

Senator Aguon won re-election by his 1st place with more votes in 2014 and 2016, than his 2nd-place run in 2012. Aguon has also run as a candidate for lieutenant governor of Guam in the 2006 and 2010 gubernatorial elections and was the running mate of former Guam Governor Carl Gutierrez in the 2010 election. In February 2017, he announced his intentions to run in the 2018 Guamanian gubernatorial election with his running mate, former U.S. Attorney Alicia Limtiaco; in August 2018 he lost the Democratic primary. He ran as a write-in candidate for the November general election, finishing third with 22% of the vote.

== Early life ==
Aguon was born June 21, 1966, to the late Francisco Blas Aguon Sr. (1936–2005) and Marcelina Leon Guerrero Aguon. He was raised on a farm in Guam. Aguon attended St. Francis School and graduated from Father Dueñas Memorial School in 1984, a Catholic high school in Mangilao. He received his bachelor's degree in 1988 from the University of Denver. He continued his education and obtained a M.B.A. also from the University of Denver in 1990.

== Personal life ==
Aguon is married to Jennifer Uncangco Lujan, who played for the women's softball team and won a gold medal for Guam at the 1998 Micronesian Games in Palau. He has four children. He is member of St. Francis Roman Catholic Parish in Yona.

== Political career ==
Aguon began working in government in 1988. He has served as the director of the Guam Department of Commerce, a research analyst and the chairman of the Guam Territorial Planning Council. Aguon enlisted in the Guam Air National Guard in 1999. He was deployed to Afghanistan in 2007 and 2008 as part of Operation Enduring Freedom.

== Guam Legislature ==
Aguon was first elected as a senator in the 24th Guam Legislature in 1997.

He has since served six two-year terms in the legislature. In 2003 Aguon has served as Vice Speaker during one term in office. His committee assignments have included the Committee on Micronesian, Veterans, and Military Affairs as well as the Committee on Education.

=== Underwood-Aguon campaign (2006) ===
Aguon was the running mate of Guam gubernatorial candidate Robert A. Underwood in 2006. In September the Underwood-Aguon ticket won in the primary election after they defeated the former governor Carl Gutierrez and senator BJ Cruz. After that, Guiterrez was endorsed to former congressman Underwood. However, the Underwood-Aguon ticket was defeated in the general election by incumbent Republican Governor Felix Perez Camacho and Lieutenant Governor Michael Cruz.

=== Gutierrez-Aguon campaign (2010) ===
In 2010, former Guam Governor Carl Gutierrez chose Aguon as his running mate for lieutenant governor in the 2010 gubernatorial election. Gutierrez and Aguon ran unopposed in the primary, marking the first uncontested Democratic primary election for governor in forty years. Gutierrez and Aguon received 8,140 votes in the primary election.

Gutierrez and Aguon lost the 2010 general election to Eddie Baza Calvo and Ray Tenorio by 487 votes. Aguon along with Gutierrez filed a lawsuit challenging the recount. In February 2012 Aguon requested to drop the suit.

=== Return to Guam Legislature ===
In 2012, Aguon ran again for island-wide office as senator in the Guam Legislature. He also worked with campaign treasurer J. Arthur "Art" Chan Jr. who is a working engineering from Hawaiian Rock Products. A returning newcomer to politics, Aguon received more votes than three incumbent senators, finishing number two, in the Democratic Party primary with 7,572 votes. Frank Aguon Jr. campaign gained more momentum between the primary and the general elections, where he placed number two island-wide with 19,518 votes, only one former senator received more votes.

== 32nd Guam Legislature ==
Senator Aguon was return to his office and sworn in as a senator on January 7, 2013, with his wife, Jennifer and his kids in attendance. As chairman of the Guam US Military Relocation, Homeland Security, Veteran's Affairs and Judiciary.

On January 25, 2013, Senator Aguon introduced Bill No. 24-32 (COR) of the Guam Code Annotated relative to waiver of fees for immediate kin of fallen heroes.

In December 2014 Senator Aguon introduced at bill to amend Section 1 of Public Law 32-208; relative to removing "Senators of I Liheslaturan Guahan" from the Competitive Wage Act of 2014.

In December Senators Aguon and Rodriguez introduced Bill No. 412-32 (COR) Guam Code Annotated, relative to requiring abortion providers to include gestational age in abortion reports.

== 2014 election ==
On June 25, 2014, Aguon filed for candidacy with the Guam Election Commission for another term as a Democratic senator for 33rd Guam Legislature. Aguon's campaign treasurer is now Epifanio Winston M. Ilicito replacing J. Arthur Chan Jr. for his working engineer.

In his bid for re-election, Senator Aguon was first place, with 6,556 votes or 79.3% of the Democratic primary vote. Senator Aguon won re-election with 1st place with more votes in 2014 than his 2nd-place run in 2012.

== 33rd Guam Legislature ==
After placing number 1 in the island-wide election, Aguon was chosen by his colleagues in the 33rd Guam Legislature to lead the Committee on Guam US Military Relocation, Homeland Security, Veteran's Affairs and Judiciary.

=== Work as senator ===
On January 21, 2015, Senator Aguon introduced Bill No. 27-33 (COR) an act relative to recognizing that public employees with superior ratings in Fiscal Year 2002 were not compensated for meritorious performance in accordance with the provisions contained in §6203, Title 4, Guam Code Annotated; authorizing the application of the Merit Bonus Program for Fiscal Year 2002; and providing for such payments.

On January 22, 2015, Senator Aguon introduced Bill No. 28-33 (COR) relative to removing the time restriction for the Guam Police Department Headquarters, Administrative and other Agency Sections from occupying Government-owned facilities at Tiyan, Guam; through amending Section 2 of Public Law No. 26-100.

In February Senator Aguon introduced Bill No. 44-33 (COR) to properly classify law enforcement personnel of the government of Guam by renaming "Attendance Officers" as "Truancy Officers" to reflect practice throughout the United States and classify such officers as law enforcement under the provisions of Public Law 29-105; and to provide uniforms and equipment to truancy officers.

On March 4 Senator Aguon introduced Bill No. 229.33 (COR) relative to the temporary employment of retired conservation officers and limited-term conservation officers recruits within the Division of Aquatic and Wildlife Resources of the Department of Agriculture should a critical need arise due to military activation or long-term disability.

In June Senators Aguon and Tom Ada introduced Bill No. 333-33 (COR) of Guam Code Annotated, and to require quarterly reports be transmitted to I Maga'lahen Guåhan and the Speaker of I Liheslaturan Guåhan of the same, relative to the voluntary placement of a distinguishing mark for Guam Veterans on the Guam driver's licences and the Guam identification card.

== 2016 election ==
On June 13, 2016, Aguon filed for candidacy with the Guam Election Commission for a next term as a Democratic senator in the Guam Legislature. Aguon won re-election for another first place with more votes in 2016.

== 2018 election ==
=== Aguon-Limtiaco campaign (2018) ===
On February 21, 2017, Aguon confirmed he intended to seek the Democratic Party nomination in the 2018 Guam gubernatorial election with his running mate Alicia Limtiaco, a former US Attorney (Guam and CNMI) and Guam Attorney General. They challenged Lou Leon Guerrero with Josh Tenorio, former governor Carl Gutierrez with Fred Bordallo, and Dennis Rodriguez with Dave Cruz. While he did not prevail in the Democratic primary, he ran a write-in campaign in the general election.

== Electoral history ==
Election	Guam Legislature	Primary rank (votes)	General rank (votes)	Result
1996	24th Guam Legislature	3 (11,749)	5 (21,556)	Elected
1998	25th Guam Legislature	No primary held	1 (27,752)	Elected
2000	26th Guam Legislature	No primary held	3 (19,802)	Elected
2002	27th Guam Legislature	1 (15,233)	3 (25,928)	Elected
2004	28th Guam Legislature	3 (8,821)	5 (17,808)	Elected
2008	30th Guam Legislature	1 (8,795)	2 (21,316)	Elected
2012	32nd Guam Legislature	2 (7,721)	2 (19,518)	Elected
2014	33rd Guam Legislature	1 (6,556)	1 (23,223)	Elected
2016	34th Guam Legislature	1 (9,418)	1 (21,070)	Elected

Guam governor, Democratic primary results 2006
Party	Candidate	Votes	%
Democratic	Robert A. Underwood/Frank B. Aguon Jr.	13,421	52.94
Democratic	Carl T.C. Gutierrez/Benjamin J.F. Cruz	11,860	46.78

Guam gubernatorial general election results 2006
Party	Candidate	Votes	%
Republican	Felix P. Camacho/Michael W. Cruz	19,560	50.25
Democratic	Robert A. Underwood/Frank B. Aguon Jr.	18,700	48.04

Guam governor, Democratic primary election 2018
Party	Candidate	Votes	%
Democratic	Lou Leon Guerrero/Josh Tenorio	8,218	32.14
Democratic	Frank B. Aguon Jr./Alicia Limtiaco	7,958	31.12
Democratic	Carl T.C. Gutierrez/Fred E. Bordallo Jr.	5,609	21.94
Democratic	Dennis Rodriguez Jr./David M. Cruz Jr.	3,761	14.71

Guamanian gubernatorial election, 2018
Party	Candidate	Votes	%
Democratic	Lou Leon Guerrero/Josh Tenorio	18,258	50.79
Republican	Ray Tenorio/V. Anthony "Tony" Ada	9,487	26.39
Democratic	Frank B. Aguon Jr./Alicia Limtiaco (write-in)	8,205	22.82
Total votes		35,950	66.83

== See also ==
- Guam Legislature
- Democratic Party of Guam

Party political offices
Preceded by Tom Ada	Democratic nominee for Lieutenant Governor of Guam; 2006, 2010	Succeeded by Gary Gumataotao
Political offices
Preceded by Lawrence Kasperbauer	Vice Speaker of the Guam Legislature; 2003–2005	Succeeded by Joanne M. Brown
