= James Espaldon =

American politician

Jim Espaldon

Minority Leader of the Guam Legislature
- In office January 2, 2017 – January 7, 2019
- Preceded by: Tony Ada
- Succeeded by: Wil Castro

Member of the Guam Legislature
- In office January 5, 2015 – January 7, 2019
- In office January 3, 2007 – January 3, 2011

Personal details
- Born: James Virata Espaldon; June 21, 1956 (age 69); Philippines
- Political party: Republican
- Spouse: Gilda Respicio Eay
- Children: 3, including 1 adopted
- Education: Menlo College (BA); Ohio Northern University (JD)

James Virata Espaldon (born June 21, 1956), also known as Jim Espaldon, is an American politician and lawyer. A member of the Republican Party, Espaldon is a former candidate for Lieutenant Governor of Guam in the 2010 gubernatorial election as the running mate of Michael Cruz. He placed fourth in the 2014 Guam Elections for the Legislature of Guam. On May 31, 2018, Espaldon announced that he would not seek reelection in 2018.

== Early life ==
Espaldon was born on June 21, 1956 in the Philippines to Dr. Ernesto "Ernie" Mercader Espaldon (1927–2006) who served as a senator for six terms in the 13th, 14th, 15th, 19th, 20th, 21st Guam Legislatures, and Dr. Leticia Virata (1928–2020), an anesthesiologist. He is also the grandson of Cipriano Acuña Espaldon and Claudia Cadag Mercader.

Espaldon graduated from Father Duenas Memorial High School in 1975. He received his bachelor's degree in business management from Menlo College in California.

== Early career ==
Espaldon has held jobs in the real estate, health care and retail industries during his early career. He previously worked as an onion farmer on the island of Maui in Hawaii. Espaldon then transitioned to retail management at ABC Stores in Hawaii before returning to Guam. He worked in Guamanian real estate before becoming director for facilities services at a medical clinic.

He obtained a Juris Doctor from Ohio Northern University Pettit College of Law in 2003.

== Career ==
Espaldon worked as a law clerk for the Supreme Court of Guam under Judge Alberto C. Lamorena III prior to entering politics. He joined the Guam bar association in September 2006.

Espaldon was first elected as a senator in the Legislature of Guam the 29th Guam Legislature in November 2006. He was sworn into office on January 1, 2007. Espaldon was re-elected to second term in November 2008 for the 30th Guam Legislature, serving until January 3, 2011.

Lt. Governor Michael W. Cruz, a candidate for governor in the 2010 gubernatorial election, chose Espaldon as his running mate for the election. The announcement was made at the Cruz-Espaldon headquarters in Piti on May 4, 2010.

=== Candidate for senator (2014) ===
On July 1, 2014, Espaldon filed for candidacy with the Guam Election Commission for a new term as a Republican senator for the 33rd Guam Legislature. Former senator Espaldon was a senator for the past two terms. Ex-senator Espaldon won the election with more votes in 2014, but won in the November election when he came to his office on January 5, 2015.

== 33rd Guam Legislature ==
After placing fourth in the island-wide election, Espaldon was chosen by his colleagues in the 33rd Guam Legislature.

On February 25, 2015 Senator Espaldon introduced Bill No. 44-33 (COR) to add a new (h) to §5201 of 22 GCA relative to the use of an individual's credit history in the employment process.

In March 2015 Senators Espaldon, Rodriguez and Vice Speaker Cruz introduced Bill No. 54-33 (COR) to amend § 4301(b) of 4 GCA, Relative to the Calculation of Government of Guam Group Health Insurance Plan Employee Contributions.

=== Retirement ===
On May 31, 2018, Espaldon announced that he would not seek re-election in 2018, keeping his pledge when he ran in 2006 to only serve four terms in the legislature. After announcing his retirement, Espaldon is planning to run for attorney general, but he recently declined.

== Personal life ==
Espaldon is married to a hairdresser Gilda Respicio Eay, father to Christian James and Victoria, also an adoptive daughter to Jonte Perez De Leon who is married to SUP Shack Guam member Lad De Leon. He also has two adopted granddaughters Gabrielle "Gabby" and Mylee de Leon and one grandson Landon.

Legislature of Guam
Preceded by Anthony Ada	Minority Leader of the Guam Legislature; 2017–2019	Succeeded by Wil Castro
