= Judith Guthertz =

Guamanian educator and politician

Judi Guthertz
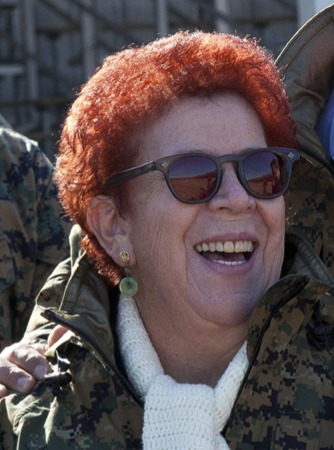
- Guthertz in 2011

Member of the Guam Board of Education
- Incumbent
- Assumed office January 6, 2025
- Governor: Lou Leon Guerrero

Member of the Guam Consolidated Commission on Utilities
- In office January 1, 2017 – March 18, 2021
- Governor: Eddie Calvo; Lou Leon Guerrero
- Succeeded by: Pedro Martinez

Member of the Guam Legislature
- In office January 1, 2007 – January 7, 2013

Member of the Guam Constitutional Convention
- In office May 4, 1977 – December 15, 1977

Personal details
- Born: Judith Paulette Guthertz
- Party: Democratic
- Education: University of the Philippines, Diliman (BA, MA, MPA, DPA); University of Guam (PGCert)

Judith Paulette "Judi" Guthertz is a Guamanian educator and former politician. A member of the Democratic Party, Guthertz served as senator in the Guam Legislature for three consecutive terms.

== Early life ==
Judith Guthertz was raised in Guam by her parents, Harry and Josette Guthertz. Guthertz attending public and private schools and graduating from the Academy of Our Lady of Guam. Guthertz earned all her degrees from the University of the Philippines Diliman: a Bachelor of Arts in speech communication, a Master of Arts in mass communication, a Master in Public Administration (major in government management) and a Doctor of Public Administration, the last two through the National College of Public Administration and Governance. In addition, she earned a postgraduate certificate through the Fast Track Teacher Certification Program of the University of Guam. She is Jewish.

== Guam Constitutional Convention of 1977 ==
A special election was held on April 16, 1977, at which Guthertz was elected to the Constitutional Convention. The Convention was convened on May 4, 1977 and by December 15, 1977, the delegates signed the draft constitution. The draft constitution was rejected in the 1979 referendum.

== Career ==
Guthertz served as Director of Public Safety and acting Chief of Police for three years.

Gurthertz worked at the University of Guam as a tenured Professor of Public Administration and Legal Studies at the School of Business and Public Administration for 28 years. Guthertz has served as Chair of the Public Administration and Legal Studies. Gurthertz served as Vice President of Academic Affairs at the University of Guam from April 1997 through January 2001, and was appointed acting President by the Board of Regents from August to December 2000.

Since the end of her terms in the Guam Legislature, Guthertz has been a classroom teacher in the Guam Department of Education.

== Guam Legislature ==
Guam Legislature	Term	Position	Committee
30th Guam Legislature	2009-2011	Chairperson	Committee on the Guam Military Buildup and Homeland Security
31st Guam Legislature	2011-2013	Chairperson	Committee on the Guam Military Buildup and Homeland Security

== Electoral history ==
Election Year	Guam Legislature	Primary Placement	General Placement	Result
2004	28th Guam Legislature	6	20	Not elected
2006	29th Guam Legislature	7	14	Elected
2008	30th Guam Legislature	10	13	Elected
2010	31st Guam Legislature	6	11	Elected
2012	32nd Guam Legislature	12	19	Not elected
2014	33rd Guam Legislature	10	22	Not elected

Consolidated Commission on Utilities election results 2020
Party	Candidate	Votes	%
Nonpartisan	Judith P. Guthertz (incumbent)	13,206	
Nonpartisan	Joseph Thomas "Joey" Duenas (incumbent)	10,005	
Nonpartisan	Pedro Roy Martinez	8,664	
Nonpartisan	Nonito Vicente Blas	6,886	
Nonpartisan	Kenneth Robert Toves Perez	5,211	
Total votes			
