= Benjamin Cruz =

American politician (born 1951)

Auditor of Guam
- Incumbent
- Assumed office September 13, 2018
- Governor: Eddie Calvo; Lou Leon Guerrero
- Preceded by: Yukari Hechanova (acting)

Speaker of the Guam Legislature
- In office January 2, 2017 – September 13, 2018
- Preceded by: Judith Won Pat
- Succeeded by: Therese Terlaje (acting)

Vice Speaker of the Guam Legislature
- In office January 5, 2009 – January 2, 2017
- Preceded by: Dave Shimizu
- Succeeded by: Therese Terlaje

Member of the Guam Legislature
- In office March 7, 2008 – September 13, 2018
- In office January 3, 2005 – January 1, 2007

Chief Justice of the Guam Supreme Court
- In office April 21, 1999 – August 31, 2001
- Appointed by: Carl Gutierrez
- Preceded by: Peter Siguenza
- Succeeded by: Peter Siguenza

Justice of the Guam Supreme Court
- In office October 13, 1997 – August 31, 2001
- Appointed by: Carl Gutierrez
- Preceded by: Monessa Lujan
- Succeeded by: Frances Tydingco-Gatewood

Personal details
- Born: Benjamin Joseph Franquez Cruz; March 3, 1951 (age 75) Guam, U.S.
- Party: Democratic
- Education: Claremont McKenna College (BA); Santa Clara University (JD)
- Website: Official website

Benjamin Joseph Franquez Cruz (born March 3, 1951) is a Chamorro lawyer, jurist, and politician who served as the Speaker of the 34th Guam Legislature from 2017 to 2018 and as Vice Speaker from 2009 to 2017. A member of the Democratic Party, he previously served in the Guam Legislature from 2005 to 2007 and again from 2008 to 2018. He was Chief Justice of the Guam Supreme Court from 1999 to 2001. In September 2018, Cruz was elected to serve as Public Auditor of Guam.

== Early life and education ==
He was born Benjamin Joseph Franquez Cruz on March 3, 1951, in Guam, the second child and only son of Juan Quenga Cruz ("Tanaguan") and Antonia Cruz Franquez. His father, who had just been elected Commissioner (Mayor) of Piti, was killed by Marcelo "Mar" C. Biscoe in 1956 when Cruz was five years old.

In 1960, while in Guam, Cruz's mother married Vicente Cruz Guerrero ("Tico"). They resettled the whole family in California in 1962.They returned to Guam intermittently, where Cruz attended grade school at St. Francis School in Yona.

He went to St. John Bosco High School in California until 1968. His bachelor's degree political science and economics was obtained in 1972 from the Claremont Men's College, and his Juris Doctor in 1975 from the Santa Clara University School of Law.

== Career ==
After graduating law school in 1975, Cruz returned to Guam to work as consumer counsel in the Attorney General's Office. Four months later, Ricardo Bordallo, who had just begun his first term as Governor of Guam, asked Cruz to serve as legal counsel in the Governor's Office, where he served throughout Bordallo's first term until January 1979.

Between Bordallo's two gubernatorial terms, Cruz established a private practice and served as minority legal counsel during the 15th and 16th Guam Legislatures. In 1983, Bordallo was elected to his second term as Governor of Guam and appointed Cruz to head the Washington, D.C. Liaison Office. There, he served as Guam's federal affairs liaison to the White House, United States Congress, and National Governors Association.

In 1984, Bordallo appointed Cruz to be a judge of the Superior Court of Guam, where he was then one of the youngest attorneys ever appointed to be a judge at 33. Several leaders of local Protestant churches testified against the confirmation, citing his "sexual preference" as disqualifying from being a good judge. Despite these interventions, Cruz was confirmed by the legislature and began a 17-year career in the island judiciary.

Cruz spent nine years as a Superior Court Judge with the family court, where he was an advocate for establishing and improving services for juvenile offenders and troubled youth. As a trial court judge, Cruz presided over the controversial lawsuit filed regarding the implementation of the Chamorro Land Trust Act, issuing the landmark decision ordering the act's implementation.

In 1997, Governor Carl Gutierrez appointed Cruz to serve as an associate justice of the Guam Supreme Court. He served as associate justice until 1999, when his colleagues elected him chief justice. Cruz then served as chief justice from April 21, 1999 until August 31, 2001, when he retired from the judiciary.

Prior to his appointment as Superior Court judge, Cruz held key positions in the Guam Democratic Party. He served as executive director from 1977 to 1983 and was national committeeman to the Democratic National Committee. Cruz returned to politics after his retirement from the judiciary in 2002 to chair Madeleine Bordallo's first successful campaign as Guam's United States Delegate to Congress. Between 2003 and 2005, Cruz once again served as an DNC national committeeman.

In 2003, Cruz was appointed by U.S. Interior Secretary Gale Norton to be one of five members of the Guam War Claims Review Commission, established by the Congress to report and make findings relative to compensation for the victims and survivors of the Japanese occupation of Guam during World War II. The Federal Commission has issued a report to Congress recommending compensation, where legislation has been pending in Congress to compensate victims and survivors.

=== Gutierrez-Cruz campaign (2006) ===
In 2004, Cruz was elected to the 28th Guam Legislature, receiving the highest number of votes for Democratic candidates. In 2006, Cruz ran for lieutenant governor as the running mate of former Governor Carl Gutierrez in the Democratic primary against a ticket of former Delegate Robert A. Underwood and Senator Frank Aguon. The Underwood-Aguon ticket won the primary but lost in the general election to the Republican incumbents, Governor Felix Perez Camacho and Lt. Governor Michael Cruz.

=== Guam Legislature ===
On January 7, 2008, Cruz was the victor in a special election to fill a vacancy in the 29th Guam Legislature left by the unexpected passing of former Republican Speaker Tony Unpingco. His victory shifted the majority from the Republicans to Democrats.

In July 2008, Cruz worked to convince Navy Rear Admiral William French (who was Commander of the U.S. Naval Forces Marianas) and other U.S. Navy officials to ease restrictions on the access of local veterans to the island's only VA Clinic located in a gated Naval hospital facility.

In 2009, Cruz introduced same-sex civil union legislation on behalf of the Guam Youth Congress. The legislation has been publicly opposed by Archbishop Anthony Apuron of the Archdiocese of Hagatna and the Catholic Church in Guam, who called for fasting and prayer for the Guam Legislature to reject the legislation. In July 2009, Cruz revised the legislation to provide for domestic partnerships between any two people.

== Personal life ==
Cruz's nomination to be a Judge in the Superior Court of Guam in 1984 was marked with protests from evangelical and Baptist church groups because he was gay. Cruz was later confirmed as a judge and was assigned to lead the Family Court for nearly ten years. Cruz revealed a longstanding homosexual relationship in a local article published in Latte Magazine in 1995. Cruz eventually became Chief Justice of the Supreme Court of Guam and was featured in an article in The Advocate about his homosexuality.

== See also ==
- List of LGBT jurists in the United States

Legal offices
| Preceded by Monessa Lujan | Justice of the Guam Supreme Court; 1997–2001 | Succeeded by Frances Tydingco-Gatewood |
| Preceded by Peter Siguenza | Chief Justice of the Guam Supreme Court; 1999–2001 | Succeeded by Peter Siguenza |
Legislature of Guam
| Preceded by Dave Shimizu | Vice Speaker of the Guam Legislature; 2009–2017 | Succeeded by Therese Terlaje |
Political offices
| Preceded by Judith Won Pat | Speaker of the Guam Legislature; 2017–2018 | Succeeded by Therese Terlaje; Acting |
| Preceded by Yukari Hechanova; Acting | Auditor of Guam; 2018–present | Incumbent |
