= Ben Pangelinan =

American politician

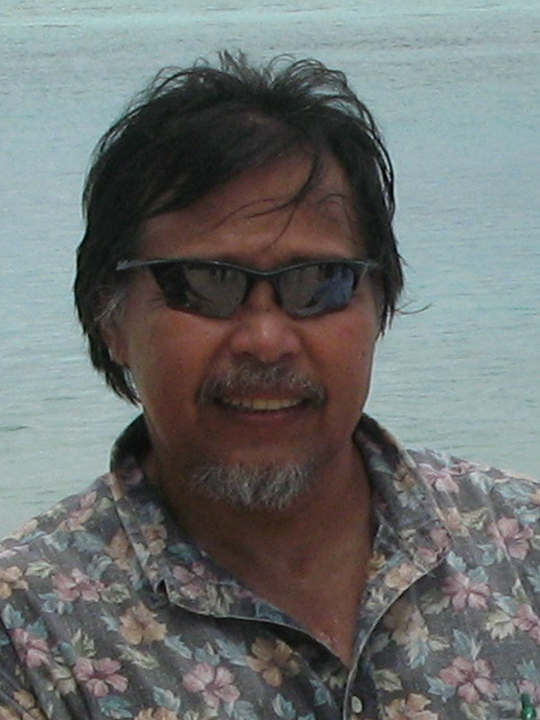
- Pangelinan at Tumon Bay in 2011

Speaker in the 27th Guam Legislature
- In office January 6, 2003 – January 3, 2005
- Preceded by: Antonio R. Unpingco
- Succeeded by: Mark Forbes

Senator of the Guam Legislature
- In office January 4, 1993 – July 8, 2014

Personal details
- Born: Vicente Cabrera Pangelinan; October 22, 1955 Saipan, TTPI, U.S.
- Died: July 8, 2014 (aged 58) Mangilao, Guam
- Resting place: Guam Memorial Park, Barrigada
- Party: Democratic Party of Guam
- Education: Georgetown University
- Website: Official website

Vicente Cabrera "Ben" Pangelinan (October 22, 1955 – July 8, 2014) was a Guamanian politician and businessman who served as the speaker of the Guam Legislature from 2003 to 2005, representing from Barrigada, as a Democrat from 1993 to his death in 2014. Pangelinan was the former sitting chairperson of the Committee on Appropriations, Taxation, Banking, Insurance, Retirement, and Land in the 32nd Guam Legislature.

== Early life ==
Pangelinan was born on October 22, 1955 in Saipan to Francisco Sablan Pangelinan (1927–2014) and Luisa Tenorio Cabrera Pangelinan (1927–1994). He attended San Vicente Catholic School in Barrigada and graduated from Father Duenas Memorial School in Mangilao in 1974. Pangelinan attended the University of Guam and graduated from Georgetown University with a bachelor's degree in Government. He was the president and owner of Group Pacific Suppliers. He served as a Democrat in the Guam Legislature from 1993 until his death in 2014 of cancer. After Pangelinan finished his degree at Georgetown University, he worked as a Member Relation Officer at FHP Health Center, Guam.

== Public life ==
Pangelinan entered public life when he first ran as a Democrat to serve as Guam's Delegate to the House of Representatives against Congressman Ben Blaz. He garnered 13,845 votes to Blaz's 16,696 in the General Election. In his second and final attempt to run as Guam's Delegate to the House of Representatives, Pangelinan received 16,437 votes, while Ben Blaz received 21,390 votes.

Pangelinan first ran for the Guam Legislature in 1992. From 1993 to 2014, Senator Pangelinan has served in each Guam Legislature with the sole exception of the 28th Guam Legislature.

== Major legislative accomplishments or milestones ==
Pangelinan's first bill to become a public law was Bill No. 327-22 (COR), which became Public Law 22-14 and authorized rebates or refunds under health insurance plans where rebates or refunds are clearly provided for in such policies. As of July 1, 2014, 240 of the bills that Pangelinan had introduced are now public law.

== Death ==
He died on July 8, 2014 at his residence in Mangilao. His viewing and funeral mass were held at the Saint Francis Church in Yona. He was buried at the Guam Memorial Park in Leyang, Barrigada.

Political offices
Preceded by Antonio R. Unpingco	Speaker of the Guam Legislature; 2003–2005	Succeeded by Mark Forbes
