= Judith Won Pat =

American politician (born 1949)

Judi Won Pat
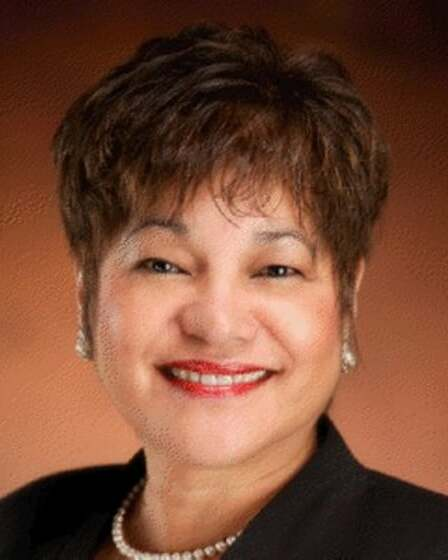

Superintendent of the Guam Department of Education
- Incumbent
- Assumed office December 30, 2025
- Preceded by: Kenneth Erik Swanson

Chair of the Guam Democratic Party
- In office October 24, 2019 – January 16, 2020
- Preceded by: Régine Biscoe Lee
- Succeeded by: Jon Junior Calvo (Acting)

Speaker of the Guam Legislature
- In office March 7, 2008 – January 2, 2017
- Preceded by: Mark Forbes
- Succeeded by: Benjamin Cruz

Senator in the Guam Legislature
- In office January 3, 1994 – January 2, 2017

Personal details
- Born: Judith Teresita Perez Won Pat; December 6, 1949 (age 76) Sumay, Guam, U.S. (now Sånta Rita-Sumai)
- Party: Democratic
- Spouse: Melvin Borja (Deceased)
- Children: 3
- Relatives: Antonio Won Pat (father)
- Education: Montgomery College; Washington Adventist; University (BA); University of Guam (MEd); University of San Diego (EdD)

Judith Teresita Perez Won Pat (born December 6, 1949), also known as Judi Won Pat, is a Guamanian politician, teacher, and school administrator who served as the speaker of the Guam Legislature from 2009 to 2017. A member of the Democratic Party of Guam, served as the senator of the Guam Legislature from 1994 to 2003 and again from 2005 to 2017. Won Pat was the former sitting chairperson of the Committee on Education, Public Library and Women’s Affairs in the 32nd Guam Legislature.

She is the current superintendent of the Guam Department of Education since 2025.

== Early life and education ==
Won Pat was born on December 6, 1949, the youngest daughter of Antonio Won Pat and Ana Salas Perez. Judith Won Pat's family moved to Silver Spring, Maryland, because her father had been elected to serve as delegate to the United States House of Representatives in Washington, D.C. She graduated from Montgomery Blair High School. After high school, she attended Montgomery College and attained an Associate of Arts in liberal arts with emphasis in political science. She graduated from Columbia Union College with a Bachelor of Arts in Psychology and Secondary Education.

Judith Won Pat attained her Master of Education from the University of Guam and her Doctor of Education degree in Educational Leadership from the University of San Diego.

== Political career ==
=== Guam 1977 Constitutional Convention ===
Authorized by Guam Public Law 13-202, the Territory of Guam held the Guam Constitutional Convention of 1977 to provide a local framework for self-government. When Judith Won Pat was 27 years old, she served as the Sinajana delegate to the 1977 Guam Constitutional Convention. Judith Won Pat served as the chairperson of the Women Rights Committee, vice chairperson of the Education Committee and also served as a member on the Gubernatorial Powers, the Municipal Government, and Natural Resources Committees, respectively. All 32 delegates to the Constitutional Convention signed the Constitution on December 15, 1977.

=== Senator in the 23rd, 24th, 26th, 28th and 29th Guam Legislatures ===
Judith Won Pat-Borja first ran to serve as senator in the 23rd Guam Legislature in 1994. She has served in the 23rd, 24th, 26th, 28th, 29th, 30th, 31st, 32nd and 33rd Guam Legislatures. The 29th Guam Legislature had a bare majority of 8 Republican senators. After the passing of Republican Senator Antonio R. Unpingco, a special election was held on January 5, 2008, at which former Chief Justice Benjamin J.F. Cruz, a Democrat, was elected to fill the vacancy left by the late Senator Antonio R. Unpingco. After the special election, the Republican minority refused to allow a change in leadership to reflect its minority status. Early in the morning on March 7, 2008, the Democratic majority held session and appointed a new leadership for the Guam Legislature, with Judith T. Perez Won Pat serving as Guam's first woman speaker of the Guam Legislature. An opinion by Attorney General Alicia Limtiaco upheld the validity of legislation issued by the Guam Legislature under its new leadership.

=== Speaker of the Guam Legislature ===
Judith Won Pat has served as speaker in the 29th, 30th, 31st, 32nd and 33rd Guam Legislatures. Speaker Won Pat was the sitting chairperson of the Committee on Education, Public Library and Women’s Affairs in the 32nd Guam Legislature.

== Post-Guam Legislature ==
After Won Pat lost re-election she has stayed out of politics since 2017 to focus on her private life and worked as an Administrator at Guahan Academy Charter School from August 2019 to October 2021. In May 2022, Won Pat reentered the political scene and publicly announced her run to become Guam's next Congressional Delegate. She lost to Republican James Moylan.

Government offices
Preceded by Kenneth Erik Swanson	Superintendent of the Guam Department of Education; Acting; 2025–present	Incumbent
Political offices
Preceded by Mark Forbes	Speaker of the Guam Legislature; 2008–2017	Succeeded by Benjamin Cruz
Party political offices
Preceded by Régine Biscoe Lee	Chair of the Guam Democratic Party; 2019–2020	Succeeded by Jon Junior Calvo; Acting
