= 2022 Guamanian gubernatorial election =

- November 8, 2022
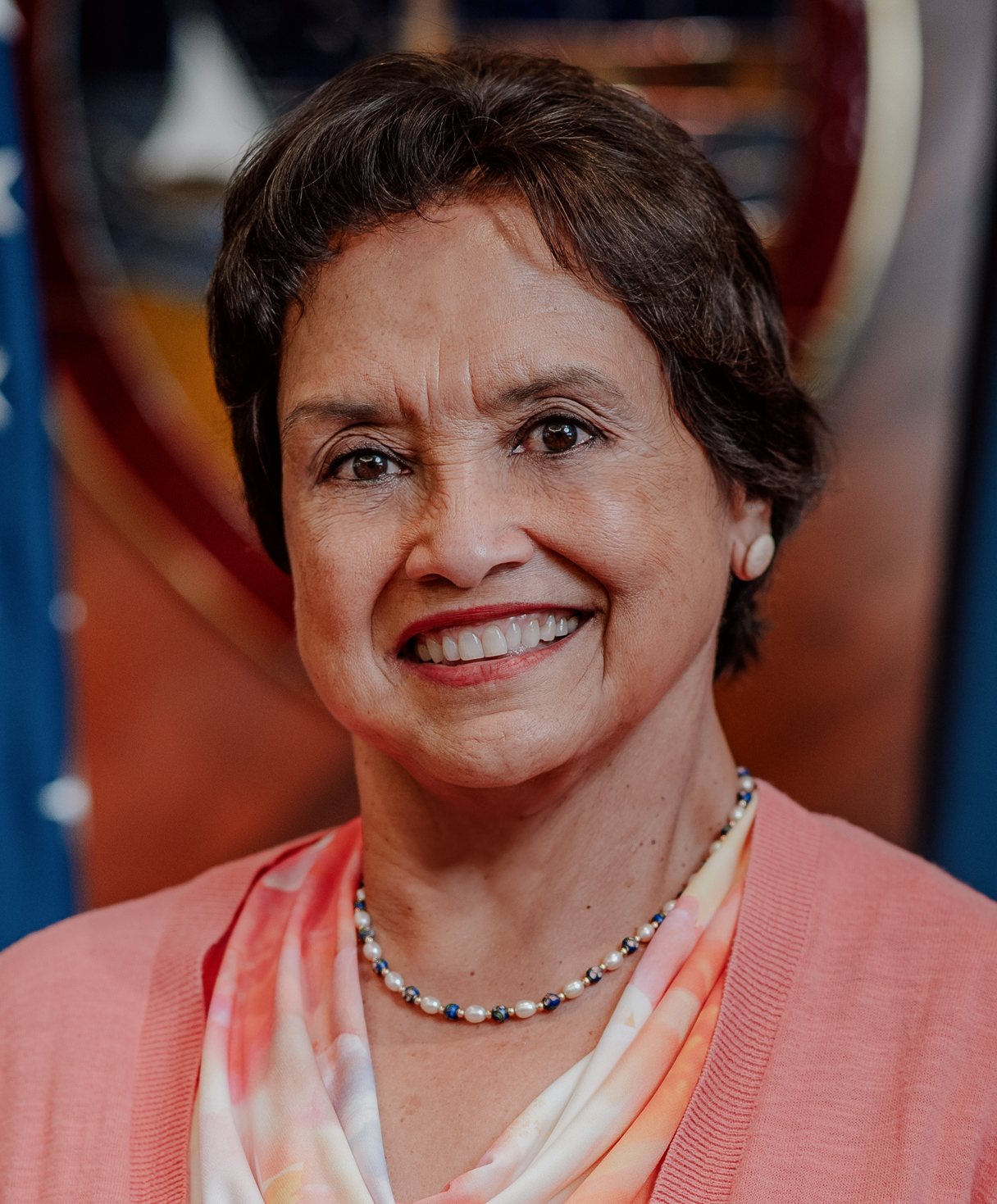

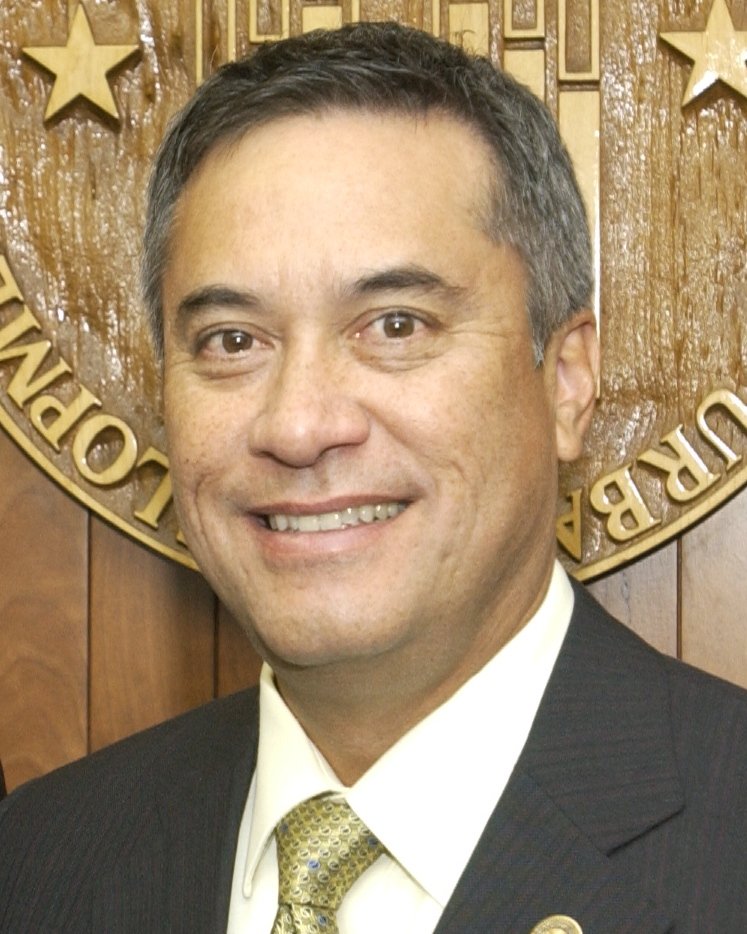
Nominee	Lou Leon Guerrero	Felix Camacho
Party	Democratic	Republican
Running mate	Josh Tenorio	Tony Ada
Popular vote	18,623	14,786
Percentage	55.49%	44.06%
- Results by village Guerrero: 50–60% 60–70% Camacho: 50–60%
Governor before election
Lou Leon Guerrero
Democratic
Elected Governor
Lou Leon Guerrero
Democratic

The 2022 Guamanian gubernatorial election took place on November 8, 2022, to elect the governor of Guam. Incumbent Democratic governor Lou Leon Guerrero, who was elected in 2018 with 50.7% of the vote, sought a second term. She faced former Republican governor Felix Camacho.

Guerrero defeated Camacho in the general election, winning a second term as governor. Guerrero was the first Democratic governor of Guam elected to a second term in office since Carl Gutierrez in 1998.

== Background ==
In 2018, Lou Leon Guerrero became the first woman elected governor of Guam, as well as the first Democrat elected to the office in twenty years. During her tenure in office, Leon Guerrero led the territory's response to the COVID-19 pandemic.

== Democratic primary ==
=== Candidates ===
==== Nominee ====
- Lou Leon Guerrero, incumbent governor
  - Josh Tenorio, incumbent lieutenant governor

==== Eliminated in primary ====
- Michael San Nicolas, incumbent Delegate to the U.S. House of Representatives
  - Sabrina Salas Matanane, KUAM managing director for local productions

=== Campaign ===
Leon Guerrero was challenged in the Democratic primary by San Nicolas, who had represented Guam's at-large congressional district in the U.S. House of Representatives since 2019. San Nicolas' campaign emphasized improving staffing at the Guam Behavioral and Wellness Center in order to better respond to drug addiction and mental health issues on the island. San Nicolas criticized Leon Guerrero's record on land return for Chamorro communities, and alleged insufficient transparency regarding the Simon Sanchez High School rehabilitation project.

=== Results ===
Democratic primary results
Party	Candidate	Votes	%
Democratic	Lou Leon Guerrero (incumbent); Josh Tenorio (incumbent)	12,224	62.49%
Democratic	Michael San Nicolas; Sabrina Salas Matanane	7,309	37.37%
Write-in		27	0.14%
Total votes		19,560	100.0%

== Republican primary ==
=== Candidates ===
==== Nominee ====
- Felix Camacho, former governor (2003–2011)
  - Vicente "Tony" Ada, incumbent territorial legislator

==== Declined ====
- James "Jim" Moylan, former Guam Senate Minority Leader (running for delegate)

=== Results ===
Republican primary results
Party	Candidate	Votes	%
Republican	Felix Camacho; Tony Ada	3,008	99.41%
Write-in		18	0.59%
Total votes		3,026	100.0%

== General election ==
=== Campaign ===
During the general election, Democratic primary runners-up San Nicolas and his running mate, Salas Matanane, publicly urged Guamanians to vote against Leon Guerrero's reelection.

Republican nominee Camacho criticized the governor for allegedly "hoarding" around $300 million in federal relief funds in the Bank of Guam, of which Leon Guerrero had previously been CEO of. The Leon Guerrero campaign accused Camacho of avoiding opportunities to debate in public settings.

=== Results ===
2022 Guam gubernatorial election
Party	Candidate	Votes	%	±%
Democratic	Lou Leon Guerrero (incumbent); Josh Tenorio (incumbent)	18,623	55.49%	+4.7%
Republican	Felix Camacho; Tony Ada	14,786	44.06%	+17.67%
Write-in		152	0.45%	–22.37%
Total votes		33,561	100.0%	
Turnout		34,074	56.36%	
Registered electors		60,462		
Democratic hold				

== See also ==
- 2022 United States gubernatorial elections
