= 2018 Guamanian gubernatorial election =

- November 6, 2018
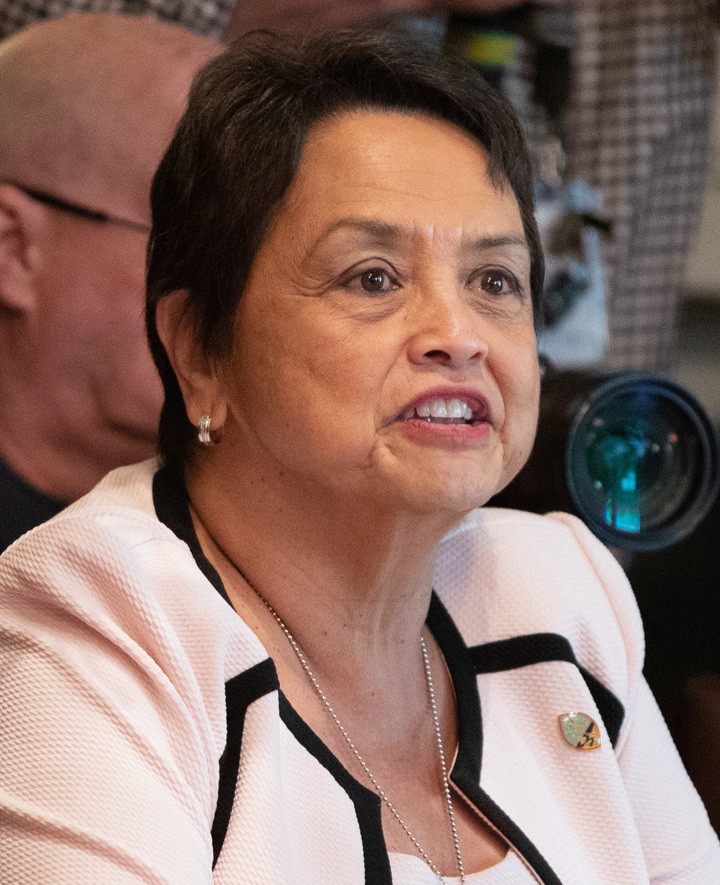

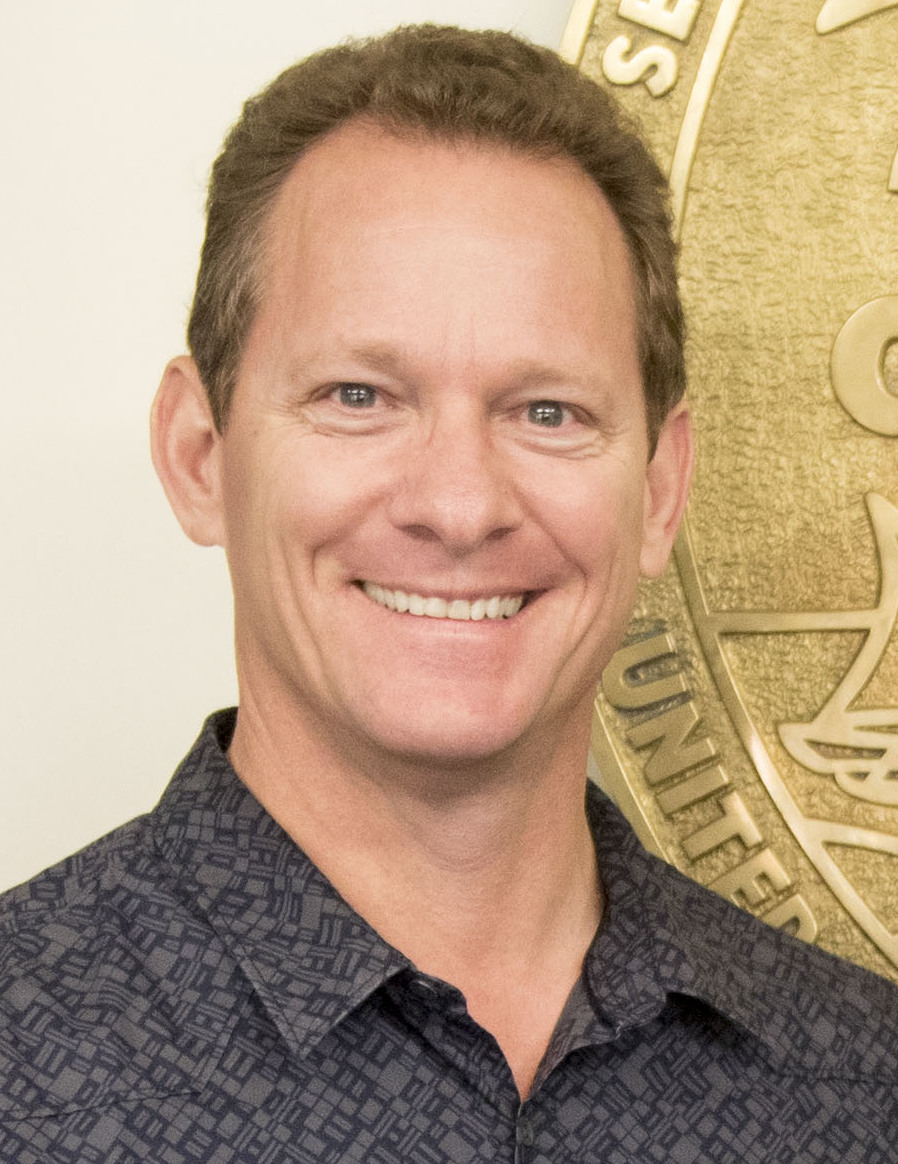

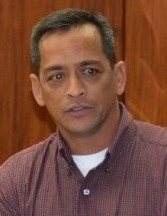
| Nominee | Lou Leon Guerrero | Ray Tenorio | Frank Aguon (write-in) |
| Party | Democratic | Republican | Democratic |
| Running mate | Josh Tenorio | Vicente Ada | Alicia Limtiaco |
| Popular vote | 18,258 | 9,487 | 8,205 |
| Percentage | 50.79% | 26.39% | 22.82% |
- Results by village Guerrero: 40–50% 50–60% 60–70%
Governor before election
Eddie Baza Calvo
Republican
Elected Governor
Lou Leon Guerrero
Democratic

The 2018 Guam gubernatorial election took place on Tuesday, November 6, 2018, as part of the general election. Therein, voters elected the 2019–2023 Governor of Guam and Lieutenant Governor of Guam.

Incumbent Eddie Baza Calvo (a Republican) served as the governor for the previous term and the current term, and was thus ineligible to run in this election.

Following a contested primary on August 25, 2018, the Democratic Party nominated Lou Leon Guerrero, a former Bank of Guam CEO, 1995–1999 & 2001–2007 territorial senator, and 1998 lieutenant gubernatorial primary candidate. She won the nomination over territorial senator Frank B. Aguon, who chose to run a write-in campaign in the general election. The Republican Party nominated Lieutenant Governor Ray Tenorio, who served under Calvo from 2011 to 2019. The campaign centered on issues including abortion rights in Guam, ethical matters, and the role of the tourism sector. Leon Guerrero won a 50.7% majority in the general election against Tenorio, who received 26.4%, and Aguon, whose write-in bid received 22.8%. She became the first female governor in Guamanian history and the first Democrat to win the governorship of Guam since 1998.

== Republican primary ==
=== Candidates ===
- Incumbent lieutenant governor Ray Tenorio
  - Lt. Governor Tenorio declared his bid for governor and chose former senator Vicente Anthony "Tony" Ada as his running mate in the upcoming gubernatorial election. The lieutenant governor and former senator officially proclaimed their gubernatorial bid in January, days after election posters of the two were spotted at the Republican Party of Guam headquarters in Maite.
  - Tenorio, along with Ada, were former senators of the Guam Legislature with Tenorio serving in the 27th-30th legislature and Ada in the 29th-33rd legislature. Ada won his seat in 29th legislature in a special election after the resignation of former Democratic senator Matt Rector.

=== Results ===
The Tenorio/Ada ticket was unopposed in the Republican primaries.

Republican primary results
| Party | Candidate | Votes | % |
|---|---|---|---|
| Republican | Ray Tenorio; Vicente Ada | 3,148 | 97.98 |
| Republican | Write-ins | 65 | 2.02 |
| Total votes | | 3,213 | 100.0 |

== Democratic primary ==
The following candidates officially declared their bids to run in the 2018 gubernatorial election.

=== Candidates ===
- Sen. Frank B. Aguon, 24th-33rd, currently serving in the 34th Guam Legislature
  - He announced his bid to be the governor of Guam in February, just within weeks of winning his ninth legislative term, and chose the former US attorney for Guam Alicia Limtiaco as his running mate in the primary and general election.
  - Aguon ran for lieutenant governor in 2006 under the Underwood-Aguon ticket and lost. He ran again for lt. governor in 2010 with former Governor Carl T.C. Gutierrez, which he also lost.
- Former senator Lou Leon Guerrero, 23rd-24th, 26th-28th Guam Legislature
  - She announced her bid to run for governor in February while attending a wedding at Plaza de España in Hagatña. In a video, she declared her candidacy and chose Joshua "Josh" Tenorio, the new vice president of Guam Autospot, to be her running mate in the 2018 primary and general election.
  - Leon Guerrero ran for lieutenant governor under the Ada/Leon Guerrero ticket in the 1998 Democratic primary and lost against the incumbent ticket of Governor Carl T.C. Gutierrez and Lt. Governor Madeleine Z. Bordallo.
  - Leon Guerrero currently serves as the chair of the board of directors at the Bank of Guam. Josh Tenorio served as the deputy chief of staff under the administration of former governor Carl T.C. Gutierrez, who was running again for governor of Guam.
- Former governor Carl T.C. Gutierrez, serving from 1995 to 2003
  - Governor Gutierrez declared his bid for governor in his home in Agaña Heights. He selected former Guam Police Department chief Fred Bordallo as his running mate. Bordallo ran for a seat in the Guam Legislature in 2016 but lost.
  - He ran again as governor in 2006 under the Gutierrez/Cruz ticket but lost in the primaries against former Delegate Robert A. Underwood and Senator Frank B. Aguon.
  - He ran again for governor of Guam in 2010, with Frank B. Aguon as his running mate. They were narrowly defeated by the Republican Calvo-Tenorio ticket by 487 votes.
  - In 2014, former governor Gutierrez and his running mate Gary Gumataotao ran against the re-election bid of Republican Governor Eddie Baza Calvo and Lieutenant Governor Ray Tenorio. They later lost the election and gave their support to the re-elected leaders.
- Sen. Dennis G. Rodriguez Jr., 31st-33rd, currently serving in the 34th Guam Legislature
  - In January, Senator Rodriguez officially announced his bid for the governor of Guam, selecting former educator and military veteran David Cruz Jr. as his running mate.
  - David Cruz Jr. faced challenges in his bid for lt. governor due to an employment contract with the Guam Department of Education. Laws on Guam prohibit government employees from running for public office. Cruz was fired by the Department of Education by late June 2018, after serving for years as an Air Force Junior Reserve Officer Training Corps instructor at the John F. Kennedy High School.

=== Results ===
Democratic primary results
| Party | Candidate | Votes | % |
|---|---|---|---|
| Democratic | Lou Leon Guerrero; Josh Tenorio | 8,218 | 32.14 |
| Democratic | Frank B. Aguon Jr.; Alicia Limtiaco | 7,958 | 31.12 |
| Democratic | Carl T.C. Gutierrez; Fred E. Bordallo Jr. | 5,609 | 21.94 |
| Democratic | Dennis Rodriguez Jr.; David M. Cruz Jr. | 3,761 | 14.71 |
| Democratic | Write-ins | 22 | 0.09 |
| Total votes | | 25,568 | 100.0 |

== General election ==
=== Campaign issues ===
==== Ethical issues ====
During the campaign, Republican nominee Ray Tenorio highlighted Leon Guerrero's tenure at the helm of the Bank of Guam, asking her if she would divest government money out of the bank if elected. Leon Guerrero's running mate, Josh Tenorio, accused the Republican nominee of having a conflict of interest issues regarding a pay increase bill.

==== Social issues ====
Both candidates debated issues centered around Guam's status as a tourism economy, with Tenorio pledging to strengthen the territory's tourism sector, while Leon Guerrero emphasized public safety measures to protect both residents and tourists.

On abortion, Leon Guerrero indicated her support for abortion rights in Guam, while Tenorio indicated he was opposed to legalizing abortion.

=== "Birthplace" controversy ===
During the election, Leon Guerrero faced criticism from opponents for her speech in which she noted she was "born and raised here". In a campaign stump speech, Leon Guerrero, of Chamorro background, stated "This is my island. I am from here, Ray. I was born and raised here, Ray ... and I am more qualified to be the governor of Guam." Republican nominee Ray Tenorio, who was born to a white family in Florida, criticized her remarks, asking "Does Lou really care about all Guamanians" in a campaign ad.

Jerry Crisostomo, the chair of the Republican Party of Guam accused Leon Guerrero's campaign of utilizing "racial undertones" in her campaign against Tenorio. Write-in Democratic candidate Frank Aguon, who lost to Leon Guerrero in the August primary, also criticized her remarks. The Democratic Party of Guam rejected these criticisms, stating in a press release that "Ray Tenorio and his team are desperate and will grab at untruths and lies for their campaign".

Some Guamian officials stood in Leon Guerrero's defense, including former Democratic senator Hope A. Cristobal. Cristobal argued that the criticism of Leon Guerrero's remarks fail to appreciate "the political nuances of indigenous Chamorros in a colonized homeland". Robert A. Underwood, former president of the University of Guam and Guam's former delegate to the U.S. House of Representatives, stated he considers it "a stretch for the (Tenorio) team to say [Leon Guerrero] is racist or xenophobic".

=== Results ===
The general elections were held on Tuesday, November 6, 2018. Democratic candidate Lou Leon Guerrero garnered 18,081 votes against Ray Tenorio's 9,419 votes. Guam law requires gubernatorial candidates to attain more than 50% of the total votes to be elected governor. Leon Guerrero passed the necessary threshold by a razor-thin margin, winning the election with 50.7% of the vote against Tenorio's 26.41% and Aguon's 22.81%.

2018 Guam gubernatorial election
| Party | Candidate | Votes | % | ±% |
|---|---|---|---|---|
| Democratic | Lou Leon Guerrero; Josh Tenorio | 18,258 | 50.79% | +14.82% |
| Republican | Ray Tenorio; V. Anthony "Tony" Ada | 9,487 | 26.39% | −37.31% |
| Democratic | Frank B. Aguon Jr. (write-in); Alicia Limtiaco (write-in) | 8,205 | 22.82% | +22.49% |
| Total votes | | 35,950 | 100.0% | N/A |
| Democratic gain from Republican | | | | |

== See also ==
- 2018 United States gubernatorial elections
