= COVID-19 pandemic in Guam =

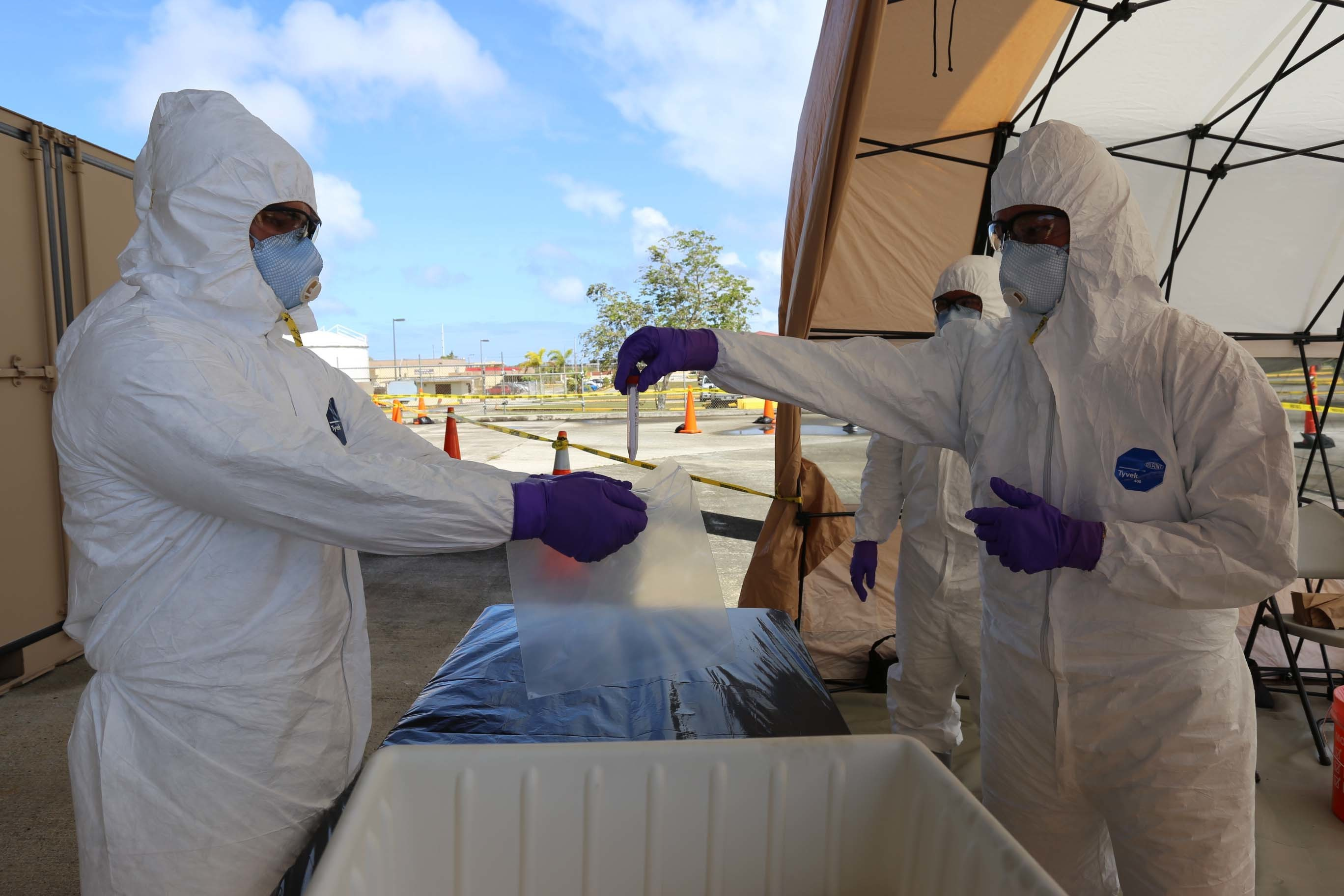
- Guam National Guardsmen dropping a COVID-19 test into a bag for transport to a testing lab, April 22

- Map of the COVID-19 pandemic in Guam (as of 25 March 2022) 10,000+ confirmed cases 1,000–9,999 confirmed cases 100-999 confirmed cases 10–99 confirmed cases 1–9 confirmed cases
- Disease: COVID-19
- Pathogen: SARS-CoV-2
- Location: Guam
- Arrival date: March 15, 2020 (6 years, 5 months and 5 days)
- Confirmed cases: 60,158
- Active cases: 150
- Recovered: 60,008
- Deaths: 408

Government website
- Guam Department of Public Health and Social Services COVID-19; Guam Homeland Security COVID-19 portal

Guam, one of the external territories of the United States of America confirmed its first case of the COVID-19 pandemic on March 15, 2020, and the first death on March 22. The Government of Guam ordered the general lockdown of the island in mid-March. Governor Lou Leon Guerrero announced the implementation of a four-step "Pandemic Condition of Readiness" (PCOR) on April 30, 2020. Travelers to Guam from designated high-risk areas must provide a recent negative COVID-19 test or undergo mandatory quarantine in a government-approved facility. Guam moved from PCOR 1 to PCOR 2 on May 10, allowing some business activity with restrictions, and then to PCOR 3 on July 20. An outbreak in mid-August was not controlled for several months, resulting in the 7-day rolling test positivity rate to spike above 15% in early October 2020, as well as infections in both the Governor and Lieutenant Governor. Guam announced a return to the lockdown conditions of PCOR 1 on August 14 to control the outbreak, which was not loosened to PCOR 2 until January 15, 2021. It was further relaxed to PCOR 3 on February 21, 2021. From December 2020 to July 2021 cases stayed very low until a surge in August 2021 largely as a result of the delta variant. By October 2021, 90% of the population was vaccinated.

By May 7, 2021, there had been 8,023 confirmed and suspected cases, resulting in 139 deaths. 95 cases were in active quarantine. According to the weekly situation report issued on May 7, 2021, 59 cases had tested positive in the previous seven days, for a test percent positivity of 2.9%. Nine cases was identified through contact tracing and seven were travelers from other parts of the United States, of which six were identified in quarantine. The 1,156 cases and one death from the USS Theodore Roosevelt, which docked at Guam amid its 2020 outbreak, are counted separately.

== Background ==
On 12 January, the World Health Organization (WHO) confirmed that a novel coronavirus was the cause of a respiratory illness in Wuhan City, Hubei Province, China, who had initially come to the attention of the WHO on 31 December 2019. Unlike SARS of 2003, the case fatality ratio for COVID-19 has been much lower, but the transmission has been significantly greater, with a significant total death toll.

Tourism from East Asian countries is a pillar of Guam's economy. In December 2019, there were 67,000 visitors from Japan (first confirmed COVID-19 case on 15 January) and 71,000 from South Korea (first case 20 January). Visitors from the US, Taiwan, Philippines, and China made up less than 10% of December 2019 arrivals. In comparison, the total population of Guam is about 165,000.

== Timeline ==
Cases

Deaths

=== February 2020 ===
- February 7: The Government of Guam denied the entry request by the cruise ship MS Westerdam, which had potentially infected passengers.

=== March 2020 ===
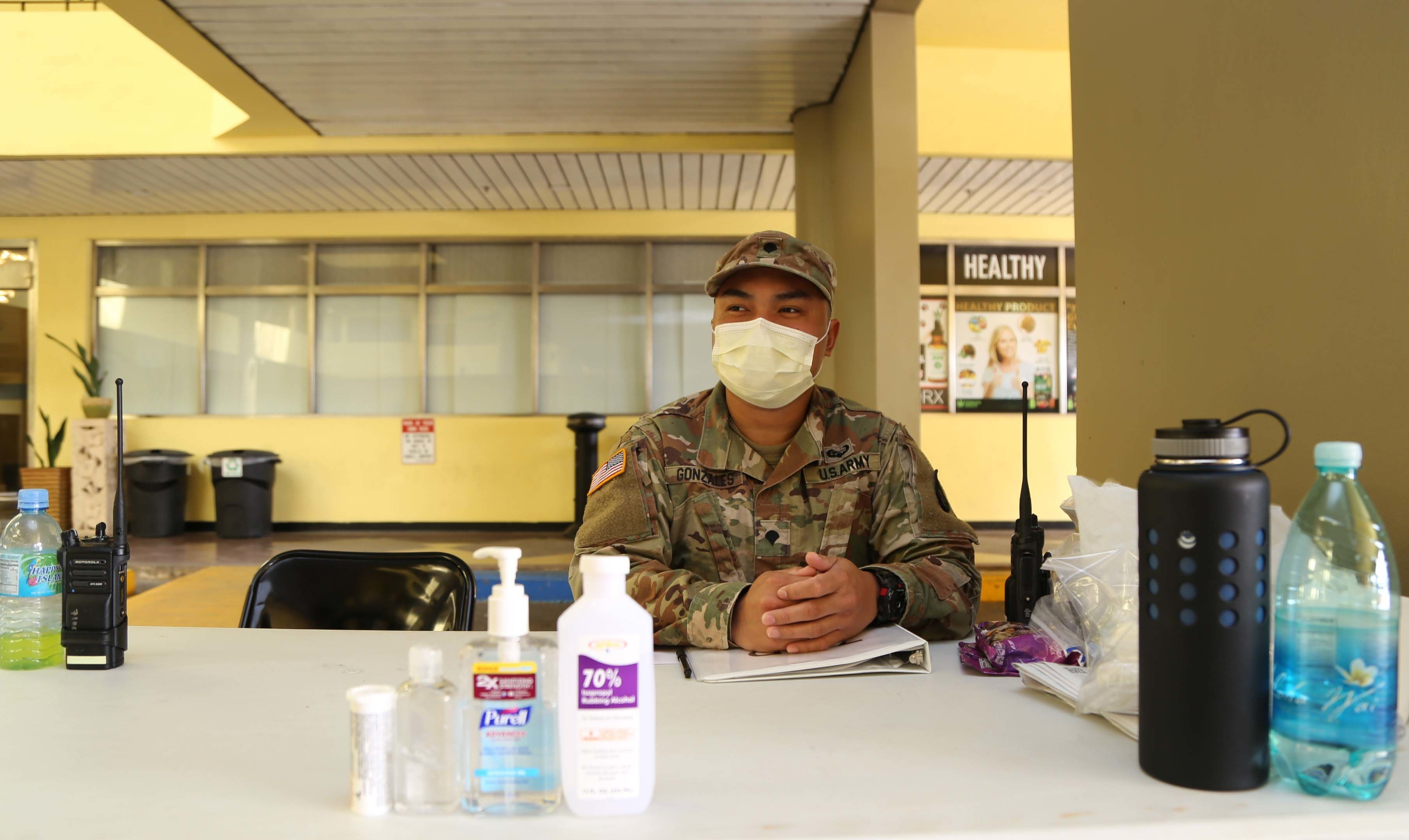
Guam Army National Guardsman at a COVID-19 isolation site, March 22

- March 9: The Guam Department of Public Health and Social Services received its first COVID-19 test kits from the U.S. Centers for Disease Control and Prevention.
- March 13: Antonio B. Won Pat International Airport began checking arrivals for fever.
- March 15: The first three cases of COVID-19 in the territory were confirmed.
  The Mayors' Council of Guam suspended all village-sponsored events and activities. It was announced that public senior citizen centers would close on March 18. Guam Memorial Hospital restricted its emergency department to staff and patients only.
- March 16: Public schools closed.
  Gathering of 50 or more people in a single room prohibited. Arriving travelers from areas affected by COVID-19 subject to mandatory quarantine.
- March 17: Naval Base Guam and Andersen Air Force Base closed on-base programs and limited base access. Defense Department schools were closed until further notice.
- March 20: Governor Lou Leon Guerrero's executive order shuts down nonessential businesses and gatherings. The same day, Japan Airlines announced flights from Narita Airport would be suspended until April 24.

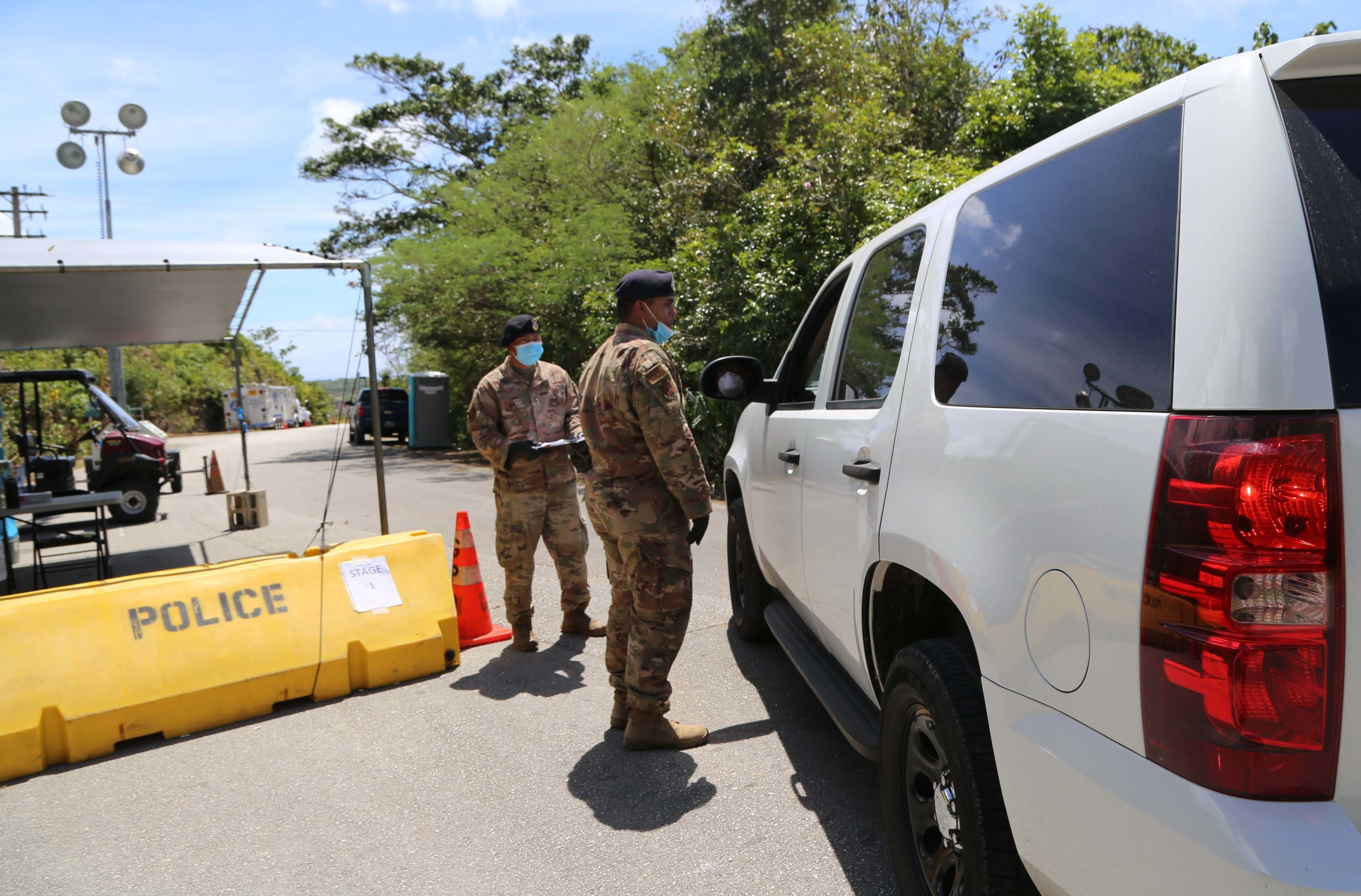
The Guam Air National Guard assisting Guam police at an isolation facility. The Guam National Guard was activated by Gov. Lou Leon Guerrero on March 21 to assist with COVID-19 efforts.

- March 22: The Governor of Guam declares a State of Emergency.
  The territory's first death from the virus, a 68-year-old woman with "multiple co-morbidities."
- March 25: Four sailors with COVID-19 evacuated from USS Theodore Roosevelt and flown to Naval Base Guam for treatment. (See COVID-19 pandemic on USS Theodore Roosevelt.)
- March 26: The University of Guam announced that all classes were moving to an online or alternate format for the remainder of the spring semester. The university planned to complete the semester on its current schedule.
  USS Theodore Roosevelt docked at Naval Base Guam due to an outbreak on board.
- March 27: The territory had confirmed 45 positive COVID-19 cases out of 308 total tests.
- March 28: United States President Donald Trump approved a disaster declaration for Guam that orders Federal assistance to supplement territory and local coronavirus recovery efforts. The President also signed the national $2 trillion COVID-19 relief bill with approximately $111 million allocated to Guam.
- March 31: The Governor's Press Secretary Krystal Paco-San Agustin confirmed two new cases of the coronavirus. Guam's Public Health Lab had tested 20 samples with the remaining 18 coming back negative.

=== April 2020 ===
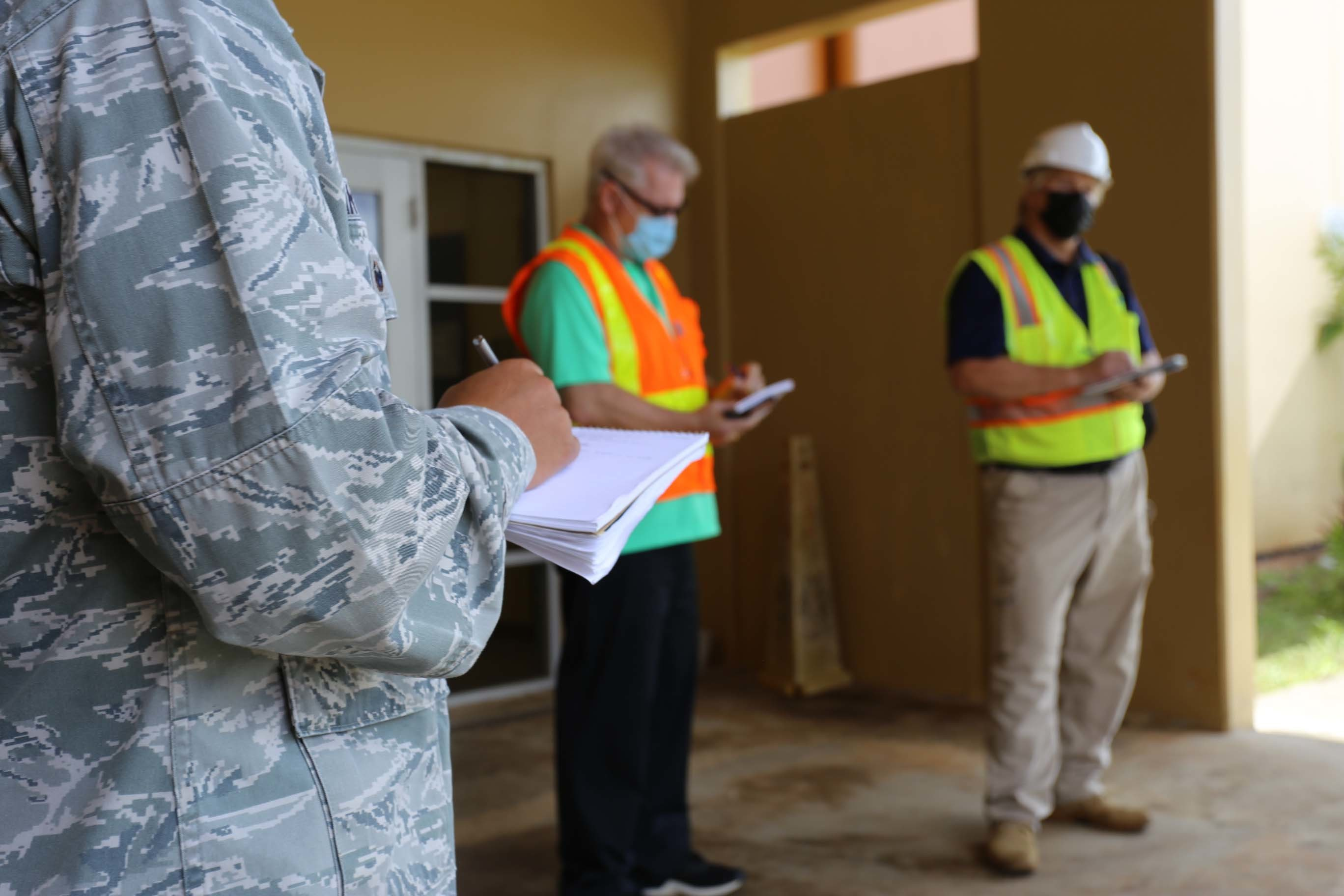
Military personnel from the Guam National Guard and Air Force's 254th REDHORSE Squadron coordinating the potential transformation of a high school in Dededo to an alternative COVID-19 care facility in April 2020

- April 4: The government projected that with a 20% reduction in the spread, COVID-19 would kill 3,000 people in five months. The population of Guam is approximately 160,000 – indicating that COVID-19 would kill about 1.8% of the territory in five months. The governor urged the populace to reduce the rate of spread.
  Governor Leon Guerrero announced that residents would be prohibited from driving for non-essential reasons from April 7. Road checkpoints would be guarded by both police and the Guam National Guard. Residents rushed to stores and banks before the restrictions.
  The Navy announced that they had secured an agreement to quarantine about 3,000 sailors from USS Theodore Roosevelt in local hotel rooms.
- April 5: The Public Health Emergency was extended until May 5.
  An executive order authorized extra pay for government workers based on their potential exposure to the virus; the maximum of an additional 25% was reserved for law enforcement, health care providers, and others with direct contact with likely infected members of the public.
  GovGuam announced that the military would be contributing 30 ventilators to local efforts.
- April 6: The Guam Department of Education Superintendent officially canceled classes for the remainder of the school year.
- April 7: It was reported that most of Guam's positive cases had tracked epidemiological links to other known cases.
- April 9: GovGuam cleared land for an additional 500 plots at the island's public cemetery in anticipation of future COVID-19 casualties. GovGuam has also temporarily waived the $500 burial fee at Vicente A. Limtiaco Memorial Cemetery in Piti. The director of the Guam Department of Parks and Recreation stated, "We're all praying the surge doesn't happen."
- April 10: Governor Leon Guerrero announced the closure of designated road lanes, where traffic will be funneled into chokepoints and National Guardsmen will ask drivers about the purpose of their trip. These can no longer be referred to as "checkpoints," as the Attorney General of Guam has advised that the government does not have the authority to create disease checkpoints.
- April 12: The University of Guam announced that it was delivering almost 300 meals daily to health care workers and volunteers at the Department of Public Health and Social Services sites. The food was donated from various restaurants, wholesalers, organizations, and individuals, with any bulk food prepared by restaurant and catering business Nayon Express, before being delivered by UOG staff.
- April 13: A sailor from USS Theodore Roosevelt died.
  Joint Region Marianas Commander Rear Adm. John Menoni announced that a sailor from USS Theodore Roosevelt had broken quarantine in the local hotel that they were located within and an investigation was ongoing.
  Gov. Leon Guerrero urged the Legislature of Guam to pass bills that would allow her to set a curfew and create checkpoints with penalties.

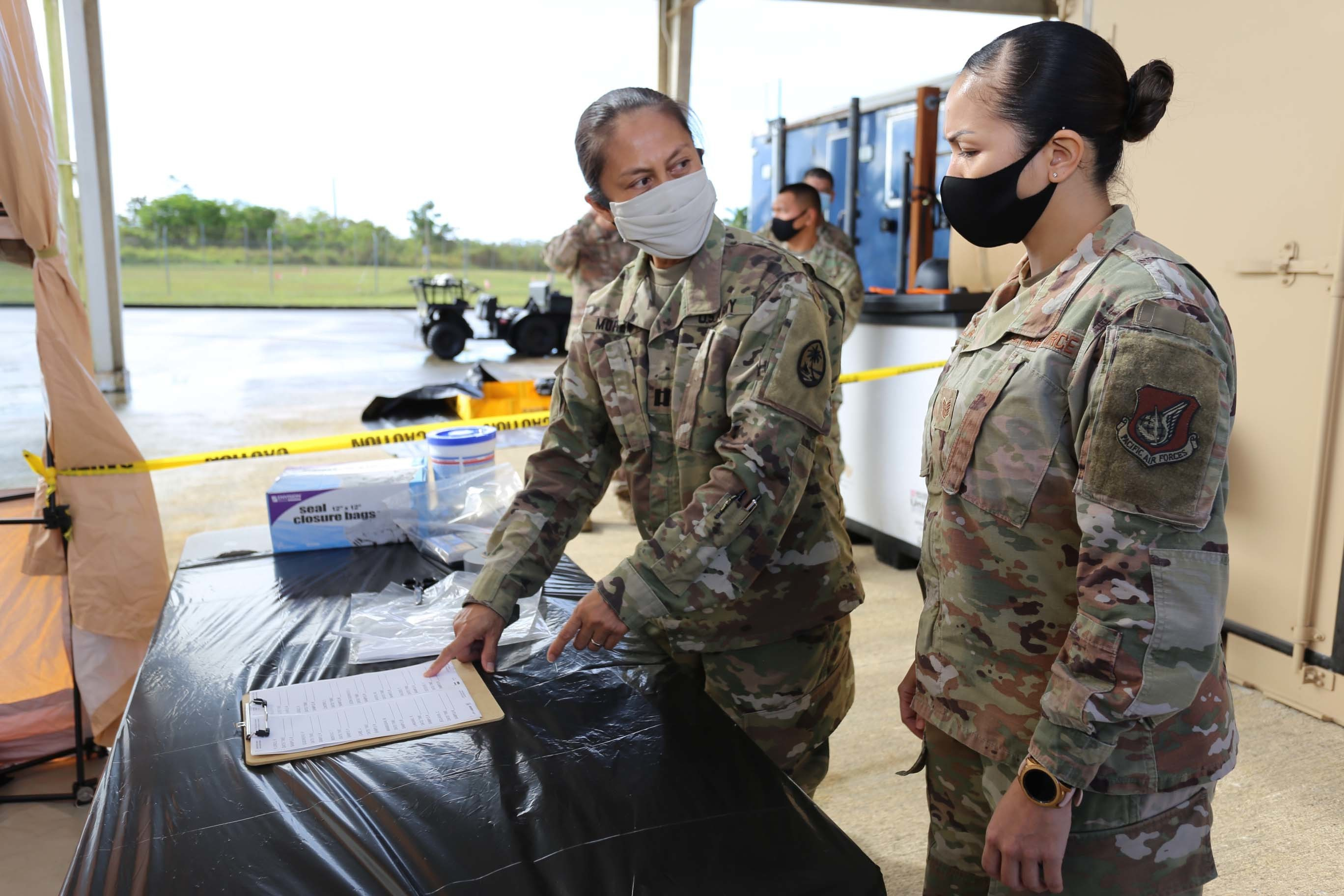
National Guard officers go over administrative procedures for COVID-19 testing at the Readiness Center in Barrigada, April 23

- April 15: The Department of Defense is building COVID-19 field hospitals on two military properties on Guam: a 150-bed hospital from the US Navy Seabees at the South Finegayan property in Dededo and a 75-bed field hospital from the US Air Force Red Horses on the grounds of Naval Hospital Guam in Agana Heights. Gov. Leon Guerrero reported that Defense Secretary Mark Esper told her that the military would make the field tents and equipment available for use by Guam once their mission in completed.

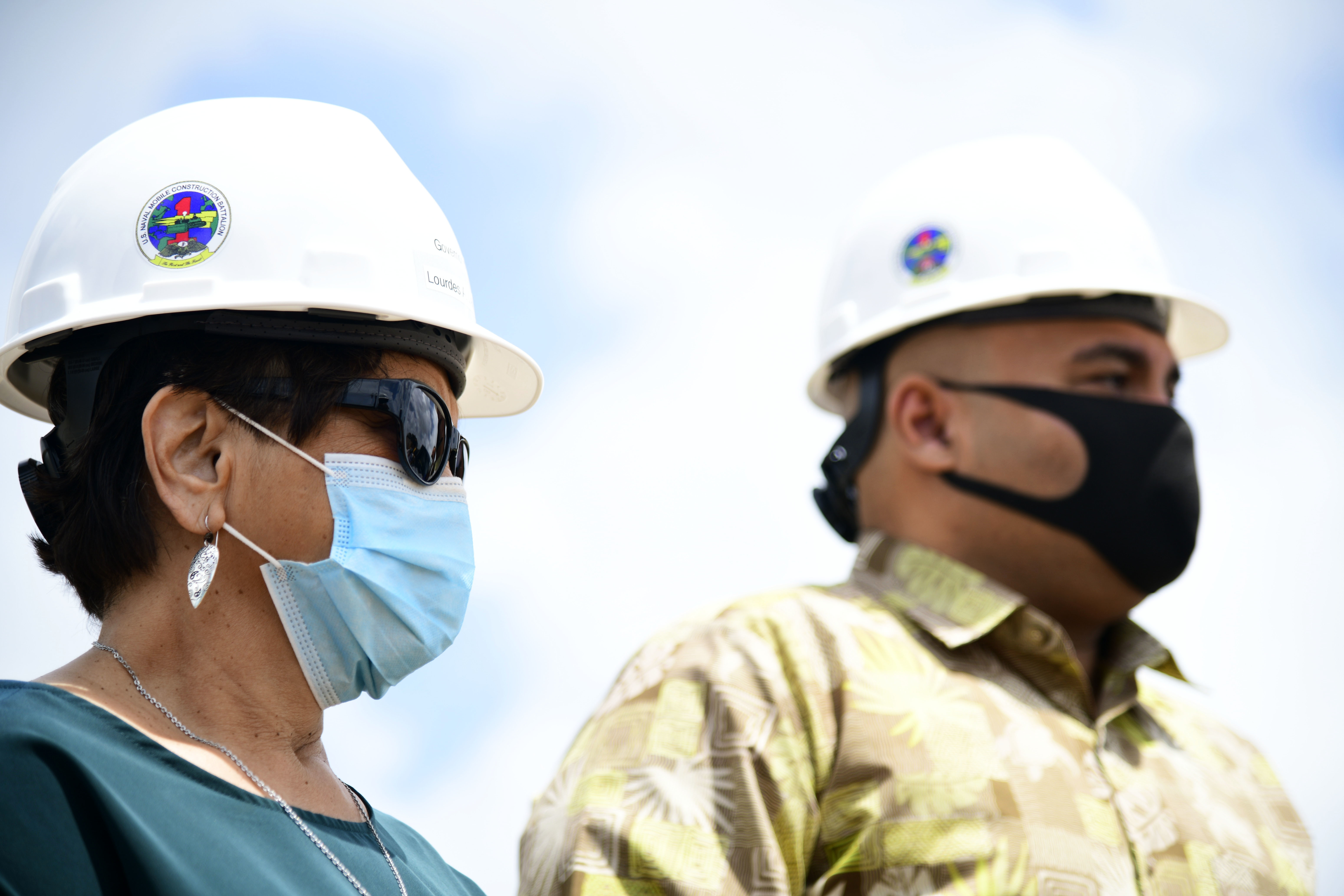
Gov. Lou Leon Guerrero and Lt. Gov. Josh Tenorio visiting temporary medical facilities on Naval Base Guam, April 29

- April 22: Most airlines extended their flight cancellations until the end of May. United Airlines remained the sole operator during the pandemic, with daily service to Honolulu and thrice-weekly service to Narita.
  Guam Regional Medical City, which was designated for non-COVID-19 care on the island, reported that it was being overwhelmed with serious cases, partially because many patients had delayed preventive care and early treatment during the pandemic. Nurses reported a 300% increase in rapid response calls and the corresponding increase in the number of deaths.
  In response to GovGuam claims that the epidemiological curve had been flattened, a Guam Daily Post editorial noted that recent COVID-19 testing had been a third of that conducted earlier in the pandemic, and urged caution about re-opening measures.
- April 30: Gov. Lou Leon Guerrero signed Executive Order 2020-11 adopting the Chålan Para Hinemloʻ (Road to Recovery) plan developed by the Guam Recovery Panel of Advisors, including a four-step Pandemic Condition of Readiness (PCOR) system ranging from maximum restrictions at 1 to no restrictions at 4.
  Leon Guerrero announced that GovGuam is tentatively planning to move from PCOR 1, restricting social gatherings and shutting down non-essential businesses and activities, to PCOR 2 on May 9, allowing some government offices and businesses to open.

=== May 2020 ===
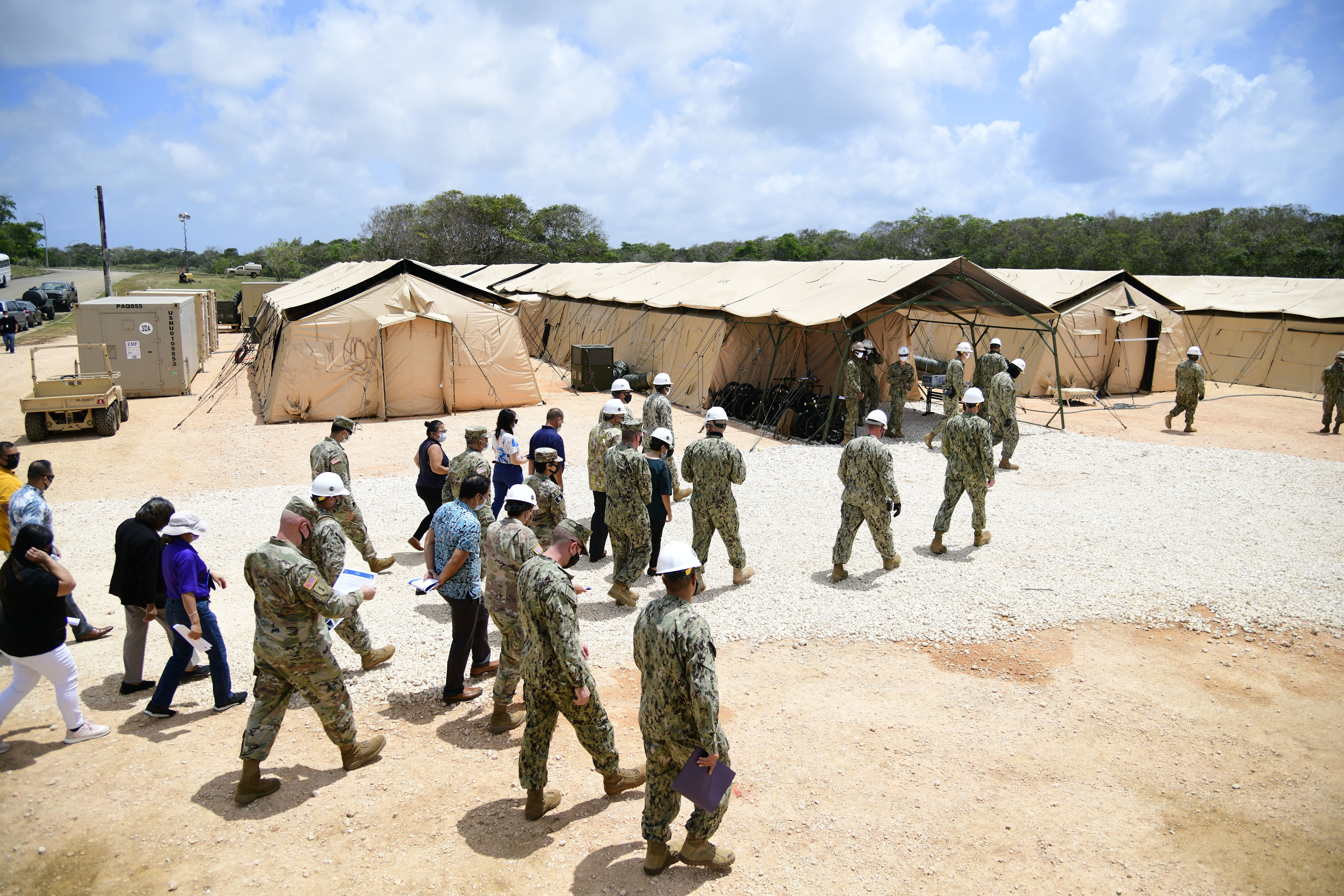
Government of Guam officials touring the Expeditionary Medical Facility onboard Naval Base Guam.

- May 5: U.S. Immigration and Customs Enforcement executed an armed raid of MedPharm Group of Companies, one of the island's largest provider of medical supplies and pharmaceuticals. The Homeland Security spokesperson confirmed that it was related to a criminal investigation regarding the pandemic.
- May 6: The Department of Health and Human Services announced that it had taken 806 samples from April 25 to May 2 in an expanded testing effort with focus on those with lack of access to health care and densely populated apartment complexes, of which two were positive. Expanded testing focused on senior care facilities and apartment complexes continued.
- May 7: The Roman Catholic Archdiocese of Agaña updated its Sacramental Protocols to allow live Mass with parishioners seated in their cars in church parking lots for the coming weekend. Eucharist would be offered to parishioners standing by their vehicles or seated inside. It further allowed in-person confession, anointing of the sick for non-COVID patients, and baptism. Parishioners with flu-like symptoms or compromised immune systems were instructed to remain home. About 75% of Guamanians identify as Roman Catholic.
- May 8: Gov. Leon Guerrero announced that Guam would move to PCOR 2 on Sunday, May 10, allowing malls, salons, shopping centers and flower shops to open at 50% capacity. People in public would continue to be required to wear masks. The Agana Shopping Center and Micronesia Mall, two of the largest malls in the territory, stated that they would limit the number of open entrances and total number of occupants, and screen all entering customers for fever with thermometers.
  The Guam office of the United States Census Bureau announced that they would begin a phased reopening of operations to conduct the 2020 Census starting on May 11, with full functioning not expected for several weeks.
  All 26 students of the University of Guam's nursing program chose to graduate in an accelerated program so they could take their licensing exams and enter the workforce early.
- May 9: Gov. Leon Guerrero stated that the mandatory 14-day quarantine of all arrivals to Guam, located at the Pacific Star Resort & Spa, would continue at least until Guam entered PCOR 3.
- May 17: The Joint Information Center announced that contracts had been signed with Hotel Santa Fe and Wyndham Garden Guam to act as quarantine facilities for incoming travelers. Occupants in quarantine at the Pacific Star were to be transferred.
- May 18: The re-opening of the Department of Revenue and Taxation in Barrigada for the first time since March drew an overflow crowd seeking to register vehicles and resolve tax situations. Guam Police and National Guard were on hand to ensure order.
  Gov. Leon Guerrero indicated that the government is planning to allow dine-in service at restaurants, at 50% capacity, starting on May 25, assuming that she receives draft public health guidance for consideration on May 21. Leon Guerrero also indicated that yoga and pilates businesses may be allowed to open soon as well, though she indicated that gyms are "a little bit more risky."
- May 21: A "residential cluster" of ten positive cases were discovered through contact tracing and had contact with two other confirmed cases; the one unrelated positive case was also traced via a confirmed case. The governor stated that the island would not elevate to PCOR 1.
  USS Theodore Roosevelt returned to sea with a reduced number of crew to conduct carrier qualification flights for Carrier Air Wing Eleven. Capt. Carlos Sardiello released a statement thanking the government and people of Guam for their support and hospitality.
- May 22: With the discovery of a "residential cluster" in Yigo, with the third largest single-day increase in confirmed cases since the pandemic began, GovGuam announced that Guam will stay at PCOR 2 with no immediate lifting of restrictions, as had been planned for May 25.
- May 23: Archbishop Michael J. Byrnes announced that the Archdiocese of Agaña would begin conducting services inside churches starting on May 30. Masks will be required and churches will be limited to 50% capacity.
- May 27: GovGuam announced that, barring a surge in new cases, the following operations are allowed to reopen on May 29, with specified conditions and safeguards: dine-in restaurants; churches; yoga, pilates, and dance businesses; and public beaches and parks. Salad bars, buffets, and other types of food self-service are prohibited. Groups of up to 25 will be allowed.
  Similarly, beginning July 1, visitors from Japan, South Korea, and Taiwan will be able to enter Guam without a 14-day quarantine. Gov. Leon Guerrero explained that those countries are not hotspots and have effective infection control. Besides United Airlines, which continues to be the sole carrier servicing Guam, only Korea's Jeju Air and Philippines Airlines have indicated that they would consider resuming operations to Guam in the summer.
  The Guam Department of Education indicated that high school students in summer school would physically meet with teachers once or twice a week and be otherwise remote. Kindergarten though eight grade will continue with remote learning. GDOE assumes that Guam will be at PCOR 3 and school buildings will be open for the new school year, but is examining options for distance learning if not.

=== June 2020 ===
- June 1: All GovGuam agencies reopened. Gov. Leon Guerrero announced that returning residents will be allowed to quarantine at home, as long as they have proof of residence.
- June 4: USS Theodore Roosevelt left Guam about two months after it first docked amid its outbreak. Some sailors who had not yet been medically cleared remained on Naval Base Guam.
- June 8: Food courts, gyms, pools, and water parks were allowed to open, with specified health protocols. GovGuam announced that arrivals from "international hot spots" would have to undergo a 14-day quarantine.
  The five-day rolling positivity rate for testing was 0.34%, compared to the 3% benchmark the government had set to move to PCOR 3. An advisor to the governor indicated that Guam was on track to move to PCOR 3 on July 1.
- June 9: The first new confirmed COVID-19 case in several days was identified on Andersen Air Force Base and described as asymptomatic.
- June 10: A study on the outbreak aboard USS Theodore Roosevelt found that two-thirds of sailors had been infected.
- June 12: The resumption of Philippine Airlines' service to Manila was delayed until June 15 due to "evolving national and provincial government restrictions and limitations." Guam had designated the Philippines as a "hotspot" requiring travelers to quarantine for 10 days.
- June 13: Naval Base Guam restored all-week access to military facilities for all authorized users on Guam.
- June 15: GovGuam increased the standard for confirmed cases to be released from quarantine to 10 days after recovery.
- June 16: Philippine Airlines resumed flights to Guam, with plans to operate weekly flights in July. Korean Air, Jin Air, Jeju Air and T'way Air tentatively plan to resume flights on July 27, subject to travel demand and the lifting of mandatory quarantines in South Korea. Japan Airlines extended it flight suspension to July 31, while China Airlines has suspended flights through August.
- June 17: Authorities revealed a cluster of seven Air Force airmen that arrived on Guam on May 25 and were housed together at a local hotel. Seventeen days after arrival one of the airman began showing symptoms. COVID-19 is generally thought to become symptomatic within 14 days. The Department of Public Health and Social Services and Andersen Air Force Base are contact tracing.
- June 19: Bars, taverns, daycare centers, bowling alleys, travel agencies, museums, zoos, and aquariums were allowed to open at 50% capacity. Bars were allowed to open at 25% capacity and bar-restaurants at 50% capacity.
  The Guam Visitors Bureau reported that tourism-related retail sales have dropped $34 million per week from before the pandemic.
- June 22: The total Air Force service members infected with coronavirus reached 37. The cluster in the Air Force unit that was housed at the Guam Reef Hotel reached 35 infected. All members of the unit were tested and put in mandatory quarantine on Andersen Air Force Base. Several airmen reportedly violated orders limiting their movement to the hotel and their work on base, and potentially exposed local businesses and employees. DPHSS was notifying businesses and planned to conduct testing of potentially exposed employees. Rear Adm. John Menoni, Joint Region Marianas Commander, stated, "Today we don't have all the facts as to how and why. We know we have an issue, we are working to find solutions, we need to fix this problem." DPHSS has
  Gov. Lou Leon Guerrero indicated that the government is looking to reopen more business types and increase the limit on social gatherings to 50, from 25, on July 1. She stated "our infection rate, even with the increase through the military, still remains below 1%. That is still really amazing." Leon Guerrero further stated that plans to lift the mandatory quarantine on incoming travelers by July 1 remained on track, but that shifting to PCOR 3 remained tentative.
- June 23: A positive test came back for someone with no known contact with other confirmed COVID cases.
- June 24: DPHSS identified 30 businesses visited by airmen in the Guam Reef Hotel cluster who tested positive for COVID-19. Residents who patronized these businesses on affected dates were urged to closely monitor their health as DPHSS arranged for additional testing capacity in the following week.
  Disaster food relief distributions will restart on June 25, 2020 and continue every other Thursday, on a first-come, first-served basis.
- June 25: A symptomatic Department of Corrections employee was one of 14 new positive cases.
  DPHSS confirmed that the initial patient at the Guam Reef Hotel outbreak was a local resident.
  DPHSS Director Linda Unpingco-DeNorcey announced that she would retire on July 3, with Laurent Duenas to become acting director.
- June 26: Gov. Leon Guerrero extended the public health emergency through July and canceled the reopening of tourism planned for July 1. Gatherings will limited to 25 people through July 1. The islandwide beach cleanup and beautification scheduled for June 27 was canceled. Guam had the greatest one-week increase of confirmed COVID-19 cases in the United States at 438%. The governor appealed for continued vigilance from the public.
- June 27: GovGuam announced that new cases were due to community spread.
  Travelers to Guam from designated "high-risk areas" must quarantine in a hotel approved by the government. This is waived for arrivals who have a negative PCR test taken within 72 hours of arrival, who may quarantine at home. Travelers in government facilities may take a test on Day 7 or Day 10 of their quarantine, subject to availability. A negative test will allow release from quarantine, though they will be monitored for symptoms through Day 14.
- June 30: The Guam Education Board approved a plan for school reopening, with staggered schedule and mandatory hygiene practices and temperature screening. No dates were set, as they will depend upon pandemic conditions.

=== July 2020 ===
- July 1: Guam developed a COVID Area Risk (CAR) Score metric to evaluate the need for testing from incoming travelers. It would eventually be applied internally to track the daily status of the disease on Guam.
  CAR Score = Daily New Cases per 100K × √Test Positivity Rate − Effective Retransmission Value (R_{t})
- July 2: Andersen Air Force Base re-restricted access to the base to mission essential personnel.
- July 3: The number of active cases surpassed 100 for the first time since early April.
- July 8: GovGuam added additional U.S. states and countries as "high risk areas" requiring quarantine for incoming travelers. Gov. Leon Guerrero stated that they were averaging 200 tests per day, with more than 16,300 tests total since the pandemic began, or about 9.2% of the population. Felix Cabrera, head of the governor's medical advisory group, said that there are five new cases daily on average, at a 1.59% positive rate; five is the absolute "threshold for concern", but 3% is the percentage threshold of concern.
- July 10: Japan Airlines extended its flight suspension for Guam to September 30.
  DPHSS closed six businesses primarily for lack of management certification, but also for failure to have neither a business pandemic plan nor posted signs promoting social distancing and masks.
- July 15: The number of travelers in mandatory quarantine in three designated hotels was 395. The Guam Ports Authority appealed to expedite testing of a contractor who had flown in from Atlanta, designated a hot spot, describing him as an essential worker for port upgrades.
- July 17: Gov. Lou Leon Guerrero announced that Guam would move to PCOR 3 at 12:01 am on Monday, July 20, as COVID-19 tracking and treatment metrics remain below the defined trigger points and all positive cases were being monitored and traced. All businesses not specifically prohibited will be allowed to operate at up to 50% capacity, or up to 10 people, whichever is greater. Gatherings of up to 50 people are allowed. Schools are permitted to open under defined minimum requirements. The public health emergency was extended to August 29 and social distancing measures continue to be mandated.
- July 20: Guam moved to Pandemic Condition of Readiness (PCOR) 3. Senior centers and organized sports remain prohibited.
- July 22: COVID-19 cases increased by eight, of which six were travel-related cases identified in mandatory quarantine. A total of five cases are isolated for observation at Guam Memorial Hospital.
- July 24: The Guam Visitors Bureau predicted 250,000 to 300,000 arrivals in fiscal year 2021, compared to 1.6 million arrivals in FY2019. Of 85 Guam Visitors Bureau members surveyed, 82% lost revenue and 61% are not paying employees.
  South Korea and Taiwan were listed as "low-risk countries", from which arrivals do not need to be tested or quarantined, provided that they stay less than five days.
- July 26: Fifteen bars were closed in the previous month because the manager did not have a certificate on sanitation and safety. This certificate has been required since August 2018, but has been stringently enforced during the public health emergency. Eleven of the 15 bars had reopened after managers were certified.
- July 27: Of nine new positive cases, seven reported recent travel from the continental United States and six were identified while in a government quarantine facility.
- July 28: The Guam Education Board pushed the first day of classes from August 11 to August 17, in order to provide more training to teachers on the new options. The plan is to divide the students population into three groups, with each group having no more than two days on campus. Students will also have the option of learning from home using either the internet or printed material.
- July 30: The Archdiocese of Agana announced that Catholic schools will open in the first two weeks of August. Students in some schools and grades will be required to stay within designated cohorts, and teachers will move between classes, rather than students. Student temperatures will be taken for entry into schools and individual classrooms. Students are required to wear masks, regularly wash their hands, and use hand sanitizer.
  Of the three new cases, two were identified in mandatory quarantine after travel: one reported travel from the continental United States and one reported travel from the Philippines. The third was identified via contact tracing in the community.

=== August 2020 ===
- August 2: Incoming travelers from designated at-risk areas may avoid mandatory quarantine in a government facility by presenting the results of a USDA-approved antigen or Abbot ID Now test. Previously, only PCR results were accepted.
- August 3: Of the nine most recent cases, four had recent travel from the United States.
  The University of Guam announced that dorm housing will be limited to single occupancy rooms only.
- August 6: Father Dueñas Memorial School closed after a positive case.
  United Airlines announced that it will increase flights to Guam starting in September.
  All Department of Corrections staff and prisoners are expected to be tested in the next several weeks.
- August 7: Gov. Leon Guerrero announced the bars would be closed, gatherings would be limited to 25 people, and funeral services limited to 10 people for two weeks starting on August 8. This, the first new limitations in months, was implemented after 52 new cases in the previous week. She stated, "While our positivity rate still remains below 2%, we are acting now to prevent a health care crisis before it begins."
  Guam Election Commission executive director Maria Pangelinan reminded the public that curbside, stay-in-your car, primary voting is meant for the elderly, infirm, and ill.
- August 10: Governor Lou Leon Guerrero announced that she had tested positive for COVID-19 after being exposed by a close relative, stating that she was experiencing moderate symptoms.
- August 12: Lieutenant governor Josh Tenorio announced that he had tested positive for coronavirus, stating that he was experiencing moderate symptoms after testing negative two days earlier. Meanwhile, Gov. Leon Guerrero stated that she was feeling much better and able to work from home.
- August 13: With an additional 26 COVID-19 cases confirmed, Gov. Leon Guerrero was expected to meet with her Medical Advisory Group in the afternoon with the anticipation of moving the island back to PCOR 2. Leon Guerrero stated that the spike in cases has been traced to people at bars and funerals weeks previously, and said that if the island went back to PCOR 2, "We will probably close other social gathering places. I'm very concerned about the dining restaurants." Dr. Hoa Nguyen, a member of the medical advisory council, stated, "We are spiraling. Most likely we will go back to PCOR 2, but I think that [PCOR 1] – for at least one to two weeks – because the virus only has a cycle of two weeks. If you let everyone hunker down for two weeks, you will break the cycle. She has a tough decision to make."
  The first day of on-campus face-to-face classes in schools was delayed by two weeks until August 31, because of pandemic safety concerns. The 62% of public school students who opted for either online or hardcopy "grab and go" course materials will start as scheduled on Monday the 17th. The island's one-week rolling positivity rate rose above 2% as a result in the spike in cases.
  The Governor's Complex, Guam Congress Building, and Guam International Airport Authority administrative offices were closed until further notice as a result of infected employees.
- August 14: Gov. Leon Guerrero placed Guam under Pandemic Condition of Readiness (PCOR) 1, the highest level, for a minimum of two weeks. From midnight on Saturday: all non-essential businesses will be closed; all public gatherings will be prohibited; in-person instruction at public and private schools will be prohibited; parks and beaches will be closed; and non-essential businesses will be allowed to conduct curbside delivery.
  The University of Guam announced that it would delay the start of classes until August 26. Guam Community College announced that it would transition to remote learning on August 17.
- August 15: The Attorney General filed misdemeanor criminal charges against a resident, alleging that he violated quarantine orders while at a government quarantine site.
  The Guam Chamber of Commerce protested the reinstatement of PCOR 1, stating, "The additional costs of keeping up with sanitation protocols and low sales revenue have meant the life and death of one company after another over the past several months. As many have tried their best to hang on, we are deeply afraid that many more businesses will not survive this two-week mandatory pause. The very companies that have served our island for many years are in grave danger of closing their doors forever."
- August 17: Stores on Guam experienced a rush of shopping after the announcement of a two-week PCOR 1 lockdown. One store estimated a 30% increase. Stores reported shoppers were calmer than in March, with one manager noting, "People learned the first time around, I think. They found out that the products will still be available."
  Thirteen COVID-19 patients are hospitalized, with four in intensive care and one on a ventilator.
  In person absentee-voting for the August 29 primary election continues, having been declared an essential government function.
- August 20: Gov. Lou Leon Guerrero announced that Guam had 105 new COVID-19 cases and that she was implementing a one-week escalation of restrictions from the previously announced PCOR 1: "all businesses will be closed with the exception of grocery stores, healthcare operations, including pharmacies, gas stations, convenience stores, hardware stores, and those operations critical to health, shelter, and the preservation of life." Of these cases, 71 came from samples from the military, including National Guard, done at Naval Hospital.
  DPHSS postponed scheduled mass testing in Yona because it is running out of storage capacity for tests and needs more time to run existing samples efficiently. The Joint Information Center also announced that it was changing from mass testing to target testing on high risk groups, contact tracing, symptomatic patients, travelers, and quarantined individuals.
  Guam's sixth COVID-19 fatality was recorded. The 70 year old died soon after hospitalization and was not a known case, but was tested after death.
  Guam Senator Wil Castro, the Republican candidate for Guam's at-large congressional district in the 2020 United States House of Representatives elections, announced that he had tested positive for coronavirus and experienced symptoms two days after a legislative staffer tested positive.
  Joint Region Marianas and its installations moved to Health Protection Condition (HPCON) C in reaction to the increase in cases, but stated that it would affect base access for eligible individuals.
- August 21: The Guam Election Commission recommended canceling or postponing the primary election scheduled for August 29. Several precinct officials have dropped out because of COVID-19 concerns and some vendors supporting the election have not been able to work because of the ban on non-essential business. Use of untrained backup precinct workers may violate the governor's orders restricting government operations during the lockdown.
- August 24: Effective August 23 through August 28, all incoming travelers were required to quarantine at a government facility for two weeks. The only exceptions are pre-approved essential health care or critical service workers who present a valid negative COVID-19 test from within five days of arrival. Guam continues the quarantine despite the CDC dropping its recommendation for travelers to self-quarantine for 14 days.
  A group of protesters against the governor's stay at home order planned a protest for August 25.

=== January 2021 ===
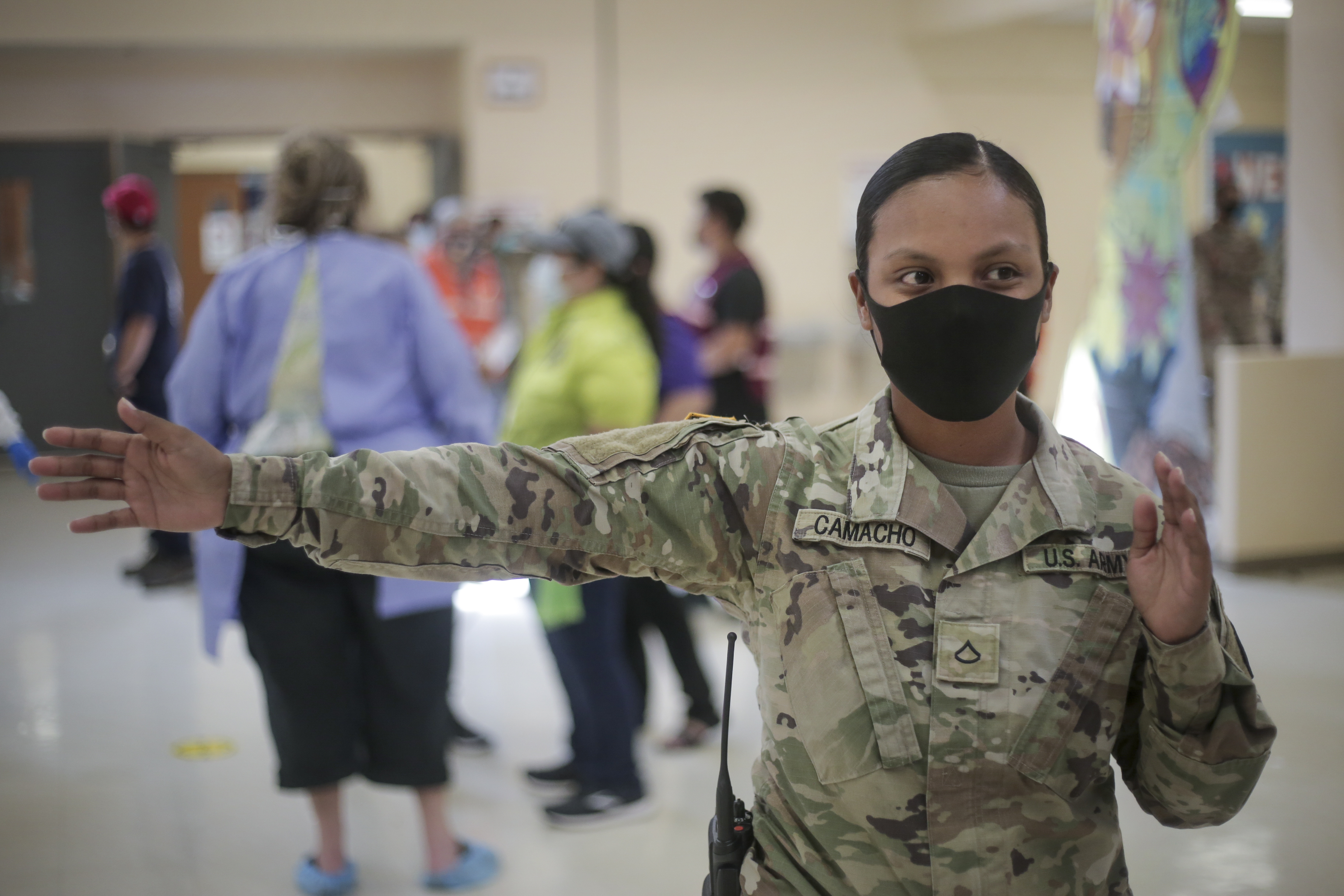
Guam National Guardsman directing crowds on the first day of vaccinations on December 17, 2020

- January 15: Guam moved from PCOR 1 to PCOR 2 for the first time since August 2020, allowing indoor dining up to 50% capacity, from 25%. Up to six people may be seated together indoors and up to 15 people at outdoor dining. Bingo halls, game rooms, movie theaters and similar businesses moved to 50% capacity. Public and private schools were allowed to hold in-person classes. Government operations, such as walk-in services, that had been suspended were resumed. However, bars remained closed.

=== February 2021 ===
- February 14: Three sailors from the USS Theodore Roosevelt tested positive for COVID-19 and were flown to Naval Base Guam for their isolation period. They were not included in the Guam case count.
- February 21: Guam moved to PCOR 3. Retail and hardware stores, and other businesses "that primarily supply other businesses with the support of supplies necessary to operate", are allowed to operate at 75% capacity and bars may open to 50% capacity. Social gatherings remain limited to 25 people, and other businesses and houses of worship remain limited to 50% capacity.

=== March 2021 ===
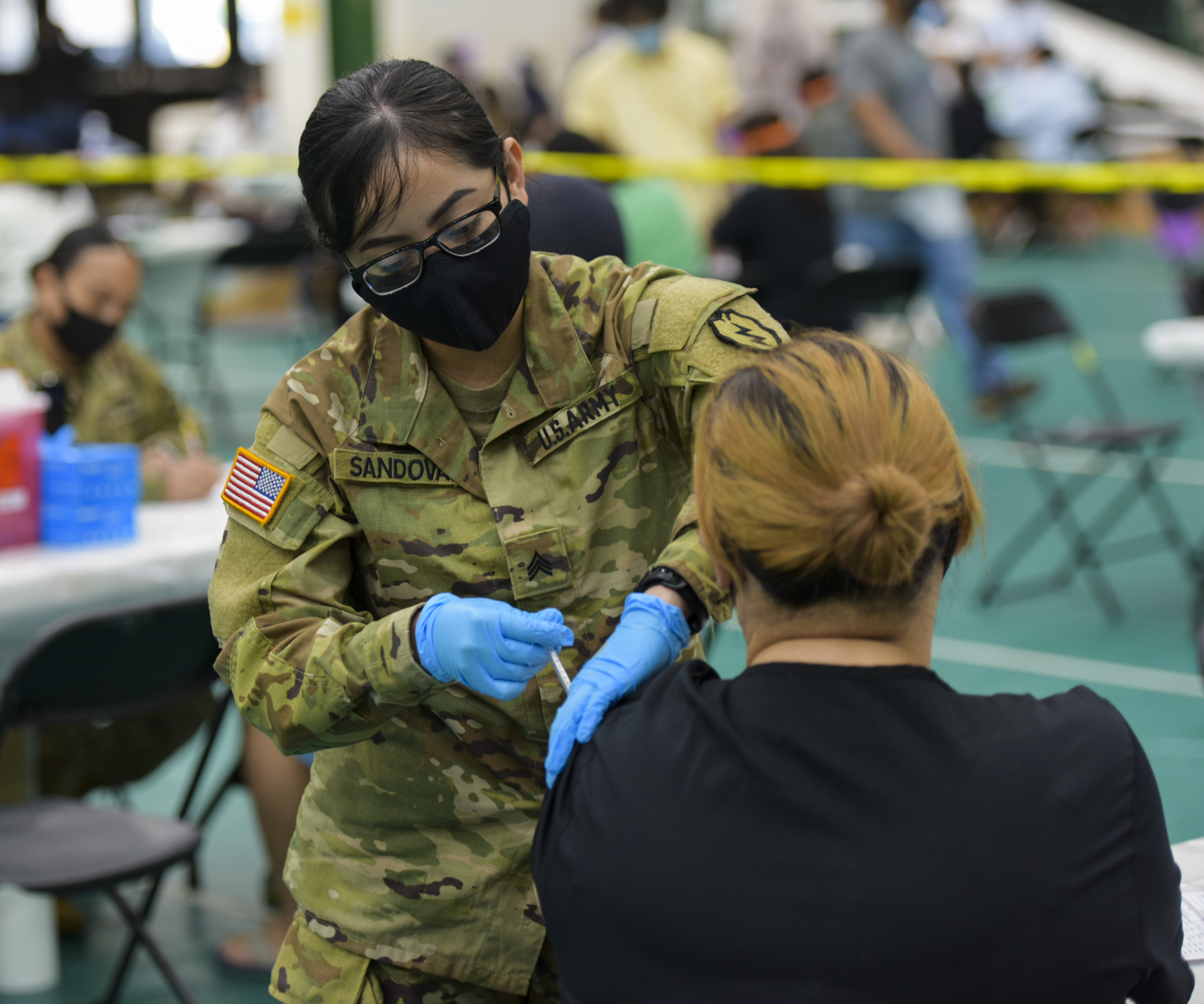
U.S. Army personnel assist the vaccine clinic at the University of Guam, April 15

- March 9: The CDC lowered Guam's travel risk from Level 4 ("travelers should avoid all travel to these destinations") to Level 3 ("travelers should avoid all nonessential travel to Guam").
  - Vaccine eligibility was expanded to prisoners, effective immediately, and announced for persons 50 years old or older in the next week.
- March 10: Major Japan tour groups which had packages open for the beginning of April in February pushed packages to mid- and late-April amid uncertainty. United Airlines, Philippine Airlines and Jin Air continue limited flights; Japan Airlines extended its flight cancelation through May 31.
- March 22: The eligible age for vaccinations was lowered to 16.
  - The California variant was confirmed on Guam. It is believed to have been present on Guam for at least two months.

== Pandemic Condition of Readiness (PCOR) recovery plan ==
On April 30, 2020, Guam Governor Lou Leon Guerrero, signed Executive Order 2020–11. In this executive order, a plan for recovery for the Guam is outlined and contains a Pandemic Conditions of Readiness (PCOR) system dictating the conditions for gradual reopening of the territory and lifting of quarantine mandates.

Per the plan mandated in the Executive Order and outlined in a presentation by Artemio "Ricky" Hernandez, Deputy Administrator of the Guam Economic Development Authority, there are four PCOR levels with corresponding degrees of quarantine restrictions and mandates: PCOR 1, maximum restrictions; PCOR 2, moderate restrictions; PCOR 3, minimum restrictions; and PCOR 4, no restrictions. The plan also includes provisions for what metrics will be considered prior to any transition from one PCOR level to the next. First, Medical data, including the number of positive cases of COVID-19 and number of hospitalizations due to COVID-19 are considered. The second criteria pertains to public health preparedness including Guam's COVID-19 testing and contact tracing capacity. Measurements of these metrics will be provided for the Governor and Recovery Panel of Advisors' consideration by the Guam Department of Public Health and Social Services.

=== Transition from PCOR 1 to PCOR 2 ===
As the plan was announced, Guam was currently at PCOR 1 with plans to transition to PCOR 2 by May 9.

==== Authorized non-governmental activities under PCOR 2 ====
Guam transitioned to PCOR 2 on May 10. At PCOR 2 the following business and non-governmental organizations are authorized to open at a limited basis after such organizations receive an approved adjustment of operations from the Guam Department of Public Health and Social Services:

- All Essential Organizations in operation under PCOR 1;
- Retail Stores;
- Real Estate and Automotive Sales;
- Beauty Salons, Cosmetic stores, and Barber Shops;
- Shopping Centers and Malls; and
- Elective medical and dental procedures.

Under PCOR 2, the following organizational activities are under review:

- Sit down Restaurants and Bars;
- Gyms and Spas;
- Outdoor sporting;
- Group Tours; and
- Bingo.

==== Authorized governmental activities under PCOR 2 ====
The following activities fulfilled by the Government of Guam are authorized under PCOR 2:

- All government services available under PCOR 1;
- Department of Revenue and Taxation services:
  - Taxpayer Services;
  - Real Property Tax Division;
  - Motor Vehicle License and Registration Offices;
  - Business License Operations; and
  - Insurance and Banking Operations.
- Department of Public Works permit processing and inspections;
- Department of Land Management real estate and permitting services;
- Department of Administration operations;
- Department of Labor regulatory and COVID-19 relief services;
- Department of Public Health and Social Services health and sanitary licensing;
- Department of Parks and Recreation services;
- Environmental Protection Agency services;
- Police Department records services;
- Department of Agriculture services;
- Housing and Urban Renewal Authority services;
- Office of Veterans Affairs services;
- Election Commission services; and
- The Guam Mayors' Council services.

=== PCOR 2 transition criteria ===
According to the recovery plan, in order for Guam to have transitioned from PCOR 1 to PCOR 2 the following conditions must have been met:

- Cases: a downward trend of confirmed and positive cases as a percent of total tests over a two-week period;
- Standard of Care: Hospitals have adequate resources to ensure that every patient is able to receive the appropriate standard of care, unless altered for non-COVID-19 reasons;
- Testing: All residents of Guam needing COVID-19 testing are able to receive testing; and
- Contact Tracing: The Guam Department of Public Health and Human Services has the capacity to monitor all current COVID-19 cases.

=== PCOR 3 transition criteria ===
In order for Guam to transition from PCOR 2 to PCOR 3 the following conditions must be met:

- Cases: a downward trend of confirmed and positive cases as a percent of total tests over a 4-week period;
- Standard of Care: Hospitals have adequate resources to ensure that every patient is able to receive the appropriate standard of care, unless altered for non-COVID-19 reasons (same as PCOR 2);
- Testing: All residents and travelers through Guam are able to receive affordable and reliable COVID-19 testing; and
- Contact Tracing: The Guam Department of Public Health and Human Services has the capacity to monitor all current COVID-19 cases (same as PCOR 2).

=== PCOR 4 transition criteria ===
In order for Guam to transition from PCOR 3 to PCOR 4, where all COVID-19 quarantine restrictions are lifted, one of the following conditions must be met:

- Vaccination: Adequate herd immunity for Guam is achieved and confirmed through the administration of FDA approved COVID-19 vaccines; OR
- Herd Immunity: Adequate herd immunity for Guam is achieved and confirmed through natural disease and recovery.

== Statistics ==
=== By villages ===
Village	Cases	Recoveries	References
Agana (Hagatna)	608	591	
Agana Heights	620	600	
Agat	910	877	
Asan	368	358	
Barrigada	2,751	2,654	
Dededo	11,617	11,303	
Inarajan	575	550	
Mangilao	3,791	3,686	
Merizo	358	342	
Mongmong-Toto-Maite	1,570	1,523	
Ordot / Chalan Pago	1,409	1,373	
Piti	418	407	
Santa Rita	1,875	1,838	
Sinajana	759	731	
Talofofo	906	882	
Tamuning	4,704	4,599	
Umatac	200	194	
Yigo	5,912	5,749	
Yona	1,619	1,576	
19/19	40,970	39,833	

== Guam Recovery Panel of Advisors ==
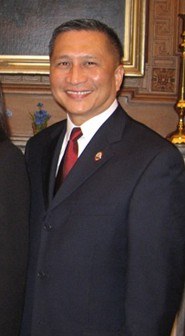
Michael Cruz is one of ten members on the Guam Recovery Panel of Advisors

The Guam Recovery Panel of Advisors advises the Governor of Guam on pandemic-related measures. It drafted the Chålan Para Hinemloʻ (Road to Recovery) plan with a four-stage Pandemic Condition of Readiness system that was adopted by Executive Order. The Panel's members and their affiliations are:

- Christine Baleto – Chair, Guam Chamber of Commerce; Chief Financial Officer, Docomo Pacific
- Joseph P. Bradley – Senior Vice President/Chief Economist, Bank of Guam
- Joaquin P. Cook – President and Chief Executive Officer, Bank of Guam
- Michael Cruz – Surgeon; President and Chief Executive Officer, Guam Regional Medical City; Former Lieutenant Governor of Guam
- W. Thane Hancock – Field Epidemiology Officer for U.S. Associated Pacific Islands, Centers for Disease Control and Prevention
- Artemio "Ricky" Hernandez – Deputy Administrator, Guam Economic Development Authority; Adjunct Instructor of Accounting and Public Administration, University of Guam
- David John – Chair, Guam Economic Development Authority Board of Directors; Chief Financial Officer, ASC Trust Corporation
- Pilar Laguaña – President and Chief Executive Officer, Guam Visitors Bureau
- Holly Rustick – President, Guam Women's Chamber of Commerce; Founder and Owner, WEGO Consulting; Instructor of English, College of Liberal Arts and Social Sciences, University of Guam

== See also ==
- COVID-19 pandemic in the Northern Mariana Islands
- COVID-19 pandemic in Oceania
- COVID-19 pandemic on USS Theodore Roosevelt
