= Joann G. Camacho =

Guamanian businesswoman and First Lady of Guam

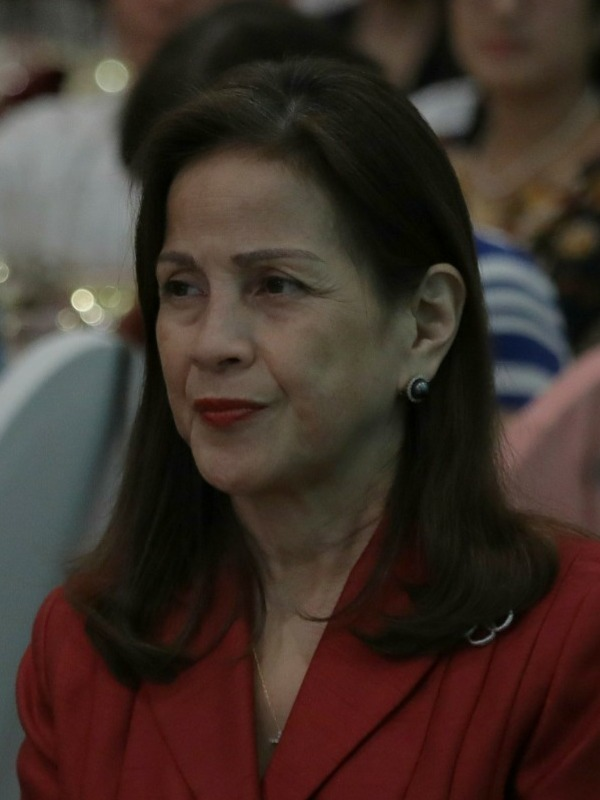
- Camacho sitting at a banquet in 2017

First Lady of Guam
- In role January 6, 2003 – January 3, 2011
- Governor: Felix Perez Camacho

Personal details
- Born: Guam
- Spouse: Felix Perez Camacho
- Children: 3
- Parents: Jesse Garcia (father); Amparo Garcia (mother)
- Education: University of San Francisco
- Occupation: Businesswoman, First Lady of Guam
- Other names: Joann Camacho, Joann Garcia Camacho

Joann Garcia Camacho is a Guamanian businesswoman and former First Lady of Guam from 2003 to 2011.

== Early life ==
Camacho was born in Guam. Camacho's parents are Jesse and Amparo Garcia. Camacho has three brothers. In 1974, Camacho graduated from Academy of Our Lady of Guam.

== Education ==
In 1978, Camacho earned a bachelor's degree in finance from University of San Francisco.

== Career ==
On November 5, 2002, when Felix Perez Camacho won the election as the Governor of Guam, Camacho became the First Lady of Guam. Camacho served as First Lady of Guam on January 6, 2003, until January 3, 2011.

Camacho became a General Manager for the Guam Visitor's Bureau, until December 2012. Nathan Denight served as Acting General Manager until a successor is named. Camacho became a director of market development for Duty Free Shoppers (DFS) Guam.

== Awards ==
- 2015 Businesswoman of the Year. Sponsored by First Hawaiian Bank and Guam Business Magazine. Presented at the 10th Annual Businesswoman of the Year Gala. September 6, 2015.

== Personal life ==
Camacho's husband is Felix Perez Camacho, former Governor of Guam. They have three children.
