= Abortion in Guam =

Abortion in Guam is legal under territorial law, but the absence of abortion providers in the territory means that it is effectively impossible to receive abortion services.

== History ==
=== Early history ===
Abortion, also known as pokká, was first documented in Guam in the 1750s. Chamorro women sought suicide, sterilization, or abortion as they did not wish to birth a child into the "subjugation of the Spaniards". Early methods utilized by Chamorro women to self-induce abortion included consuming drinks made from tree trunks, roots, and leaves.

=== 20th century ===
There were no clinics or doctors providing abortion services during much of the 1990s. During this time, women who sought abortion services often traveled to the Philippines to get an abortion, though abortion was and continues to be illegal in the country. In 1990, the Legislature of Guam enacted a law prohibiting abortion in all cases except when there was "substantial risk" to the woman's life or continuing the pregnancy would "gravely impair" her health.

This law was challenged by the American Civil Liberties Union (ACLU) and struck down by the ninth circuit court of Guam in a case called Guam Society of Obstetricians and Gynecologists v. Ada in 1997. Future governor Lou Leon Guerrero, then serving as president of the Guam Nurses Association, testified in opposition to the ban.

=== 21st century ===
From the 2000s to 2016, there were two doctors in Guam who provided abortion services: Dr. Edmund Griley at Guam PolyClinic, and Dr. William Freeman, who worked at the Women's Clinic. Griley's retirement in November 2016 left Freeman as the sole abortion provider in the territory, with Freeman ultimately retiring in his own right in June 2018. Pacific Daily News reported that Freeman's successor at the Women's Clinic, Dr. Jeffrey Gabel, is personally opposed to abortion and refuses to provide abortion services.

With abortion illegal in the nearby Philippines and not possible to receive in the neighboring Northern Mariana Islands, women in Guam seeking abortion care reportedly can pay out-of-pocket to travel to Hawaii or Japan for such services. It was estimated in 2021 by The Guardian that the cost of the eight hour flight to Hawaii for individuals seeking abortion care amounted to around $1,000.

Elected in the 2010 gubernatorial election, Republican governor Eddie Baza Calvo signed pro-life legislation into law during his tenure. In 2012, the Woman's Reproductive Health Information Act was implemented, creating new restrictions for abortion provision, including a 13-week gestational age limit, a physician-only requirement, and a 24-hour mandatory waiting period. Following an ACLU lawsuit, the legislation was blocked by Frances Tydingco-Gatewood, Chief Judge of the District Court of Guam, in a 2021 ruling. However, the law was reinstated in 2023 in a decision by the 9th Circuit Court of Appeals, citing the U.S. Supreme Court's decision in Dobbs v. Jackson Women's Health Organization in 2022.

Elected governor in the 2018 election, Lou Leon Guerrero, a Democrat, has advocated in favor of abortion rights in Guam. In office, Guerrero has publicly supported the recruitment of an abortion provider to Guam. In 2022, Guerrero vetoed legislation passed by the Legislature of Guam that aimed to restrict abortion rights.

== Access to services ==
Guam Memorial Hospital does not openly provide abortions and refused to refer women with life-threatening conditions to other medical facilities for abortions. Guam Regional Medical City also does not have any doctors willing to openly provide abortions and they did not provide referrals to doctors who provided them. The Department of Public Health and Social Services also refuses to provide abortion referrals.

=== Telemedicine prescription of abortion pills ===
Doctors licensed to practice in Guam but resident elsewhere may prescribe abortion pills to Guam residents via telemedicine. As of August 2023, two doctors in Hawaii have done so. In practice, this limits abortions in the territory to 11 weeks. However, on August 1, 2023, the 9th Circuit Court of Appeals upheld the law that women must consult a doctor in-person. The court reasoned that a doctor on Guam who did not perform abortions could refer women to one of the Hawaiian doctors who provided telemedical care. It was not known at the time if there would be Guamanian doctors willing to do so.

== Statistics ==
In 2017, 239 abortions were performed, and 97% of these abortions utilized surgical intervention, such as dilation and curettage or intrauterine saline infusion. All but three abortions were performed at Women's Clinic. As legal abortion is no longer readily available in Guam, the current rate of abortion is not known.

Abortions by Type of Procedure (number of cases)
Method of Abortion	2017	2016	2015
Uterine curettage or evacuation	219	279	259
Intrauterine Saline Solution Infusion	13	8	3
Medication-induced	3	1	1
Feticidal injection	4	0	0
Not reported	0	1	0
Total Number of Cases	239	289	263

== Anti-abortion and abortion rights movements ==
The Catholic Church in Guam is active in support of restrictions on abortion through participation in the Rally for Life march. In 1990, Archbishop Anthony Apuron, then the archbishop of the Archdiocese of Agaña in Guam, threatened to excommunicate members of the Legislature of Guam who opposed banning abortion in the territory.
