= Lou Leon Guerrero =

Governor of Guam since 2019

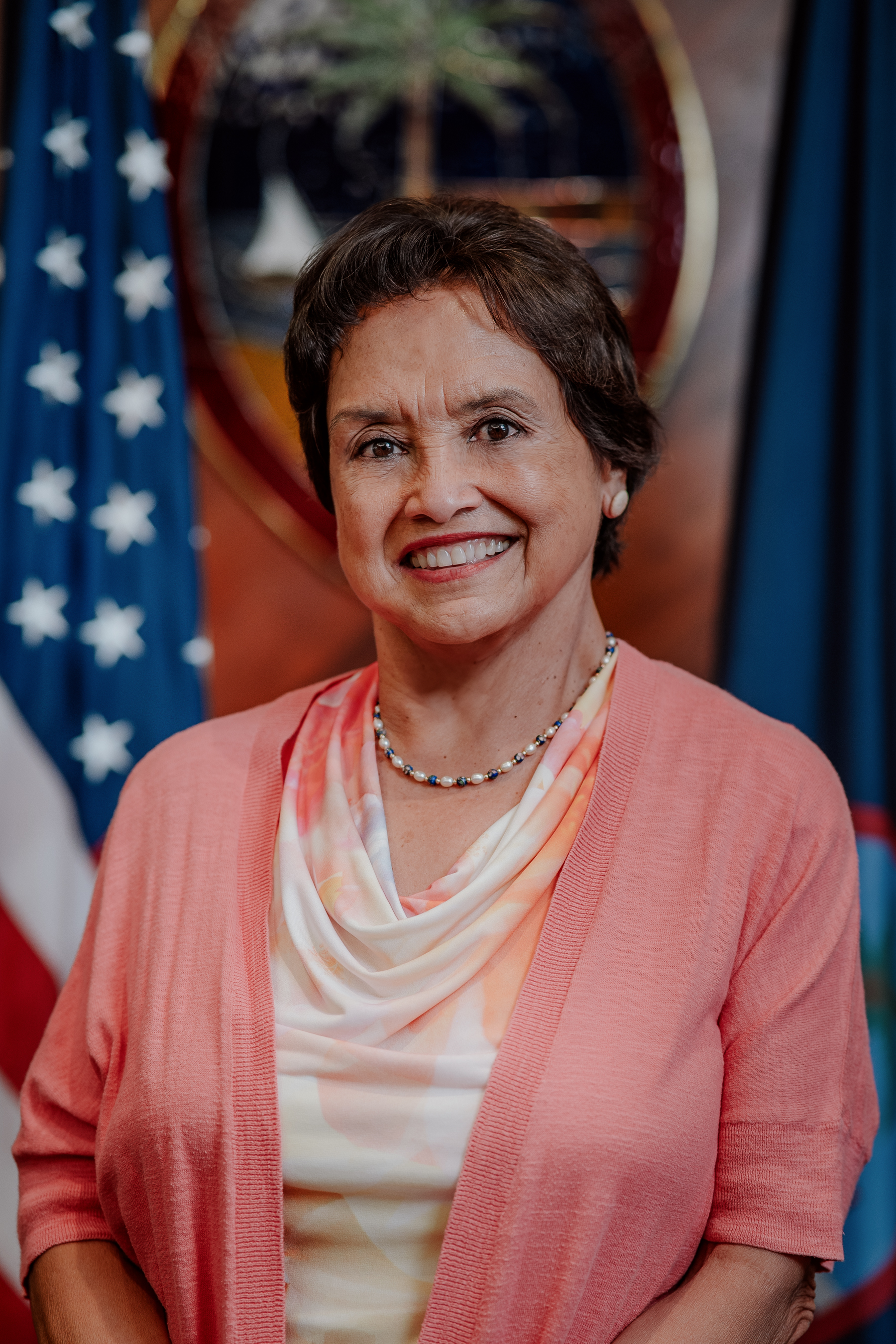
- Official portrait, 2025

9th Governor of Guam
- Incumbent
- Assumed office January 7, 2019
- Lieutenant: Josh Tenorio
- Preceded by: Eddie Calvo

Member of the Guam Legislature
- In office January 1, 2001 – January 1, 2007
- In office January 2, 1995 – January 4, 1999

Personal details
- Born: Lourdes Aflague Leon Guerrero; November 8, 1950 (age 76) Guam
- Party: Democratic
- Spouse: Jeffrey Cook (m. 1983)
- Children: 2
- Education: California State University, Los Angeles (BS); University of California, Los Angeles (MPH); University of Washington (GrDip)
- Website: Office website

Lourdes Aflague "Lou" Leon Guerrero (born November 8, 1956) is a Guamanian politician and former banking executive, lobbyist, and nurse who has served as the ninth governor of Guam since 2019. A member of the Democratic Party, Guerrero is the first woman to serve in the position. Leon Guerrero had served in the Guam Legislature from 1995 to 1999 and again from 2001 to 2007. From 2007 to 2017, Leon Guerrero was president and CEO of the Bank of Guam.

Born and raised in Guam, Leon Guerrero received her B.S. in Nursing from Cal State Los Angeles and a MPH from the University of California, Los Angeles. Leon Guerrero worked as a nurse in California and Guam, eventually becoming president of the Guam Nurses Association. In this role, she opposed efforts to outlaw abortion on the island. Leon Guerrero won election to the Guam legislature in 1994, serving two terms before unsuccessfully running for lieutenant governor in 1998. She went onto serve in the Guam legislature again from 2001 to 2007, before leaving public service to work in the private sector until 2017.

Leon Guerrero re-entered politics to mount a campaign for governor of Guam in the 2018 gubernatorial election. Leon Guerrero and her running mate Josh Tenorio defeated Republican opponent Ray Tenorio, and was inaugurated as governor on January 7, 2019. In office, Leon Guerrero has signed legislation to raise the minimum wage in Guam and coordinate the territory's response to the COVID-19 pandemic. As governor, Leon Guerrero has vetoed efforts by the Guam Legislature to institute further restrictions on abortion in Guam. She was reelected to a second term in the 2022 election.

== Early life and education ==
Born in Guam, Lou Leon Guerrero is the daughter of Jesus Sablan Leon Guerrero (1927–2002), founder of the Bank of Guam, and Eugenia Calvo Aflague Leon Guerrero. She has two brothers, Jesse and Anthony (1952–2005). She attended the Academy of Our Lady of Guam High School, moving to the U.S. mainland to study and work in Southern California.

In 1973, Leon Guerrero earned her Bachelor of Science degree in Nursing at California State University, Los Angeles. She went on to attain a Master of Public Health degree at the University of California, Los Angeles (UCLA) in 1979. In 2009, she went back to school in Seattle, Washington to receive a master's degree from Pacific Coast Banking School.

She is of Filipino descent.

== Nursing career ==
Lou Leon Guerrero worked as a staff nurse at Santa Monica Hospital in Santa Monica, California, before returning to Guam in 1980. She worked at Guam Memorial Hospital in 1980, eventually becoming the hospital's assistant nursing director. She then went to work at the Family Health Plan clinic and served as Director of Operations (1989–1999).

In 1989, Leon Guerrero, as the president of the Guam Nurses Association, provided the sole testimony from a Chamoru woman against Bill 848, a legislative measure intended to outlaw abortion on the island.

== Early political career ==
Leon Guerrero served as a senator of the 23rd, 24th, 26th, 27th, and the 28th sessions of the Guam Legislature. Leon Guerrero authored the public law which created the Healthy Futures Fund, which currently funds medical care and cancer research in Guam. In addition, she introduced and secured the passage of the Natasha Protection Act, which regulates public smoking.

=== Entry to the Guam Legislature (1995–1999) ===
==== 23rd Guam Legislature ====
Lou Leon Guerrero first ran to become senator in the Guam Legislature in 1994. Leon Guerrero advanced to the general election after having placed 9th, with 10,611 votes, in a field of 30 candidates in the Democratic Party of Guam's legislative primary election held on September 3, 1994. Leon Guerrero won election, receiving 20,168 votes and placing 9th in the general election on November 8, 1994.

Leon Guerrero was inaugurated to serve in the 23rd Guam Legislature on Monday, January 2, 1995. During her first term in the Guam Legislature, Leon Guerrero was in the majority and sponsored or co-sponsored 18 public laws.

==== 24th Guam Legislature ====
Lou Leon Guerrero ran for reelection into the 24th Guam Legislature in 1996. She advanced to the general election after having placed 12th, with 10,185 votes, in a field of 31 candidates in the democratic primary election of September 7, 1996. She won reelection, receiving 20,050 votes and placing 8th in the general election on November 5, 1996. As a minority member of the 24th Guam Legislature, Leon Guerrero sponsored or cosponsored 6 public laws.

=== 1998 lieutenant gubernatorial candidacy ===
Incumbent Governor Carl T.C. Gutierrez and Lieutenant Governor Madeleine Z. Bordallo had two Democratic primary election challenges for Governor and Lieutenant Governor of Guam in 1998. Lou Leon Guerrero was chosen as the running mate of Senator Thomas C. Ada, and Senator Angel L.G. Santos ran with Mayor Jose "Pedo" Terlaje. The "Tom and Lou" ticket placed 2nd in the Democratic gubernatorial primary on September 5, 1998, with 9,788 votes.

=== Return to the Guam Legislature (2001–2007) ===
==== 26th Guam Legislature ====
Leon Guerrero returned to public service in 2000, when she ran for a seat in the 26th Guam Legislature. The legislative primary election was cancelled that year, so Leon Guerrero automatically advanced to the general election held on November 7, 2000. She secured a seat in the legislature by placing 5th in the legislative general election with 19,670 votes. As a minority member of the 26th Guam Legislature, Leon Guerrero sponsored 5 public laws.

==== 27th Guam Legislature ====
Leon Guerrero stood for election in the 27th Guam Legislature in 2002. Leon Guerrero advanced to the general election after placing 3rd in the Democratic primary election on September 7, 2002, with 14,112 votes. Leon Guerrero placed 5th in the general election on November 5, 2002, with 23,651 votes. As a majority member of the 27th Guam Legislature, Leon Guerrero sponsored 21 public laws.

==== 28th Guam Legislature ====
Leon Guerrero ran for re-election into the 28th Guam Legislature in 2004. After placing fourth in the Democratic primary election on September 7, 2004, with 7,983 votes, Leon Guerrero advanced to the general election. Leon Guerrero was elected into the 28th Guam Legislature, placing 14th and garnering 14,853 votes in the general election on November 2, 2004. During this term she authored 27 bills, 9 of which became public laws.

== Business and non-profit career ==
In 2007, Leon Guerrero was honored as Guam's Small Business Administration's Women in Business Champion. She then attended Pacific Coast Banking School at the University of Washington, graduating from its program in 2009. Succeeding her father and her brother, Leon Guerrero is the chairwoman of the board, chief executive officer and president of the Bank of Guam.

In August 2011, she was appointed director of the BankGuam Holding Company, and is also a director at Teleguam Holdings, LLC. Leon Guerrero was deemed Guam’s 2010 Executive of the Year by Guam Business Magazine.

=== Involvement in non-profit activity ===
Since its founding in 2009, Lou Leon Guerrero has served as Board Chair for Guampedia. Leon Guerrero was a founding member and served as the first President of the Guam Women's Chamber of Commerce.

== Elections ==
=== 2018 gubernatorial candidacy ===
In February 2017, former senator Leon Guerrero officially announced her bid to be the next Governor of Guam. The Bank of Guam President selected Joshua Tenorio, Vice President of Guam Auto Spot, to be her running mate in the upcoming Democratic primaries.

The Leon Guerrero/Tenorio ticket faced-off with 3 other Democratic tickets: the Aguon/Limtiaco ticket, the Gutierrez/Bordallo ticket, and the Rodriguez/Cruz ticket. They emerged victorious with 32% of the primary vote. Leon Guerrero was elected as Guam's first female governor after defeating the Tenorio/Ada Ticket in the general election with 50.7% of the vote.

=== 2022 gubernatorial candidacy ===
Leon Guerrero ran for reelection, with Josh Tenorio as her running mate. They got reelected with 55.49% of the vote, defeating the Camacho/Ada Ticket.

== Governor of Guam (2019–present) ==
Lou Leon Guerrero was inaugurated on January 7, 2019, as the 9th Governor of Guam at the University of Guam Calvo Field House in Mangilao.

=== Policy initiatives ===
==== Minimum wage increase ====
Leon Guerrero expressed her support for a proposal to raise Guam's minimum wage to $9.25 in September 2019. She signed the bill increasing in the minimum wage in stages in October 2019. The first stage, increasing the minimum wage to $8.75 per hour went into effect in March 2020. A bill has since been passed and signed into law by Governor Guerrero delaying the increase in the minimum wage by 6 months, to reduce its impact to businesses during the Covid-19 Pandemic. However, the minimum wage has since been raised to $9.25 an hour.

==== Response to inflation ====
Going into 2022, the Guamanian economy experienced increased inflation that hindered residents' purchasing power. To offset the rising cost of power and to avert economic crisis, Leon Guerrero pursued the creation of a monthly $100 credit for ratepayers in the territory.

==== War claims advance payments to World War II survivors ====
Speaker Tina Rose Muña Barnes introduced a bill to expedite the payment of war claims to survivors of atrocities committed on Guam during World War II in July 2019. In October 2019, the Lieutenant Governor Josh Tenorio and Chief of Staff Tony Babauta visited Washington, D.C., to lobby for war claims, among other administration initiatives. Congressman Michael San Nicolas claimed that the local bill to pay war claims was a sham.

Leon Guerrero signed the war claims bill into law on January 3, 2020. The first war claims checks were distributed at a ceremony on January 29, 2020. By February, hundreds of Guam World War II survivors received their compensation through the local advance payment system.

==== Abortion rights ====
In December 2022, Leon Guerrero vetoed legislation passed by the Legislature of Guam seeking to curtail abortion rights in Guam, with the relevant bill compared to the 2021 Texas Heartbeat Act. The legislature ultimately fell two votes short of overriding Leon Guerrero’s veto.

=== Management of the COVID-19 Pandemic on Guam ===
==== "Path to Half" vaccination campaign ====
Leon Guerrero announced an ambitious "Path to Half" vaccination campaign at a press conference on March 15, 2021. She set the goal of vaccinating half of Guam's adult population by May 1. The Path to Half benchmark was met 3 days ahead of the deadline of May 1.

== Personal life ==
Guerrero married attorney Jeff Cook. She has two children, Joaquin and Mariana, and seven grandchildren.

== See also ==
- List of female governors in the United States

== Bibliography ==
- 109th Congress (2006). United States of America Congressional Record Proceedings and Debates of the 109th Congress Second Session. Vol. 152, Part 5. Government Printing Office. GGKEY:9P94KC6FCL1.
- US Congress (November 1, 2010). Congressional Record, V. 153, PT. 4, February 17, 2007 to March 12, 2007. Government Printing Office. ISBN 978-0-16-086976-1.

Party political offices
Preceded by Carl Gutierrez	Democratic nominee for Governor of Guam; 2018, 2022	Succeeded by Therese Terlaje
Political offices
Preceded by Eddie Baza Calvo	Governor of Guam; 2019–present	Incumbent
