= Abortion in the Northern Mariana Islands =

Abortion in the Northern Mariana Islands is illegal. Article I, Section 12 of the Constitution of the Northern Mariana Islands states that "The abortion of the unborn child during the mother's pregnancy is prohibited in the Commonwealth of the Northern Mariana Islands, except as provided by law". No law has been passed legalizing abortion in the Northern Mariana Islands. Instead, Northern Mariana Islands criminal law states that performing an abortion is a crime punishable by up to five years imprisonment.

== History ==
During the 1990s women who wanted to get an abortion often travelled to the Philippines as there were no legal options in the Marianas under the aforementioned constitution. Women had few options as to where they could get a legal abortion, including Hawaii or Japan.

=== Legislative history ===
Abortion in the Commonwealth of the Northern Mariana Islands, a United States territory, is illegal per title 11 of the Trust Territory Code, under section 51, which states:

Every person who shall unlawfully cause the miscarriage or premature delivery of a woman, with the intent to do so, shall be guilty of abortion and upon conviction thereof shall be imprisoned for a period of not more than five years.

This was reaffirmed with amendment no. 3 to the Constitution of the Northern Mariana Islands, which states:

The abortion of the unborn child during the mother's pregnancy is prohibited by the Commonwealth of the Northern Mariana Islands, except as provided by law.

This measure was adopted in 1985. It was still in place in 2024.

In 2000, the law was debated after Gov. Pedro Tenorio asked the attorney general to review the constitutionality of the 1985 law. The opinion of an attorney general as to the constitutionality of a law, of course, is merely an opinion and does not nullify a statute. Accordingly, the opinion only served to generate confusion with respect to the legality of abortion within the commonwealth. Any confusion was eliminated with the U.S. Supreme Court's decision in Dobbs v. Jackson Women's Health Organization in 2022, which eliminated the U.S. constitutional right to an abortion first articulated by the court in its 1973 Roe v Wade decision.

=== Judicial history ===
In a 1971 case, Trust Territory v. Tarkong, the Appellate Court of the Trust Territory (see also United States territorial court) held:

As far as the woman herself is concerned, unless the abortion statute expressly makes her responsible, it is generally held, although the statute reads any "person", that she is not liable to any criminal prosecution, whether she solicits the act or performs it upon herself.

Although abortion is illegal within the commonwealth, in practice, abortions to save the life of the mother or when pregnancy is the result of rape or incest occur without prosecution.

== Financing ==
In 1998, the only reason an abortion would be eligible for public funding was if it was a result of rape or incest, or if continuing the pregnancy would endanger the life of the woman. This policy has been in place since April 19, 1994, and relates mostly to Medicaid funding.
