= Josh Tenorio =

Guamanian politician and businessman (born 1973)

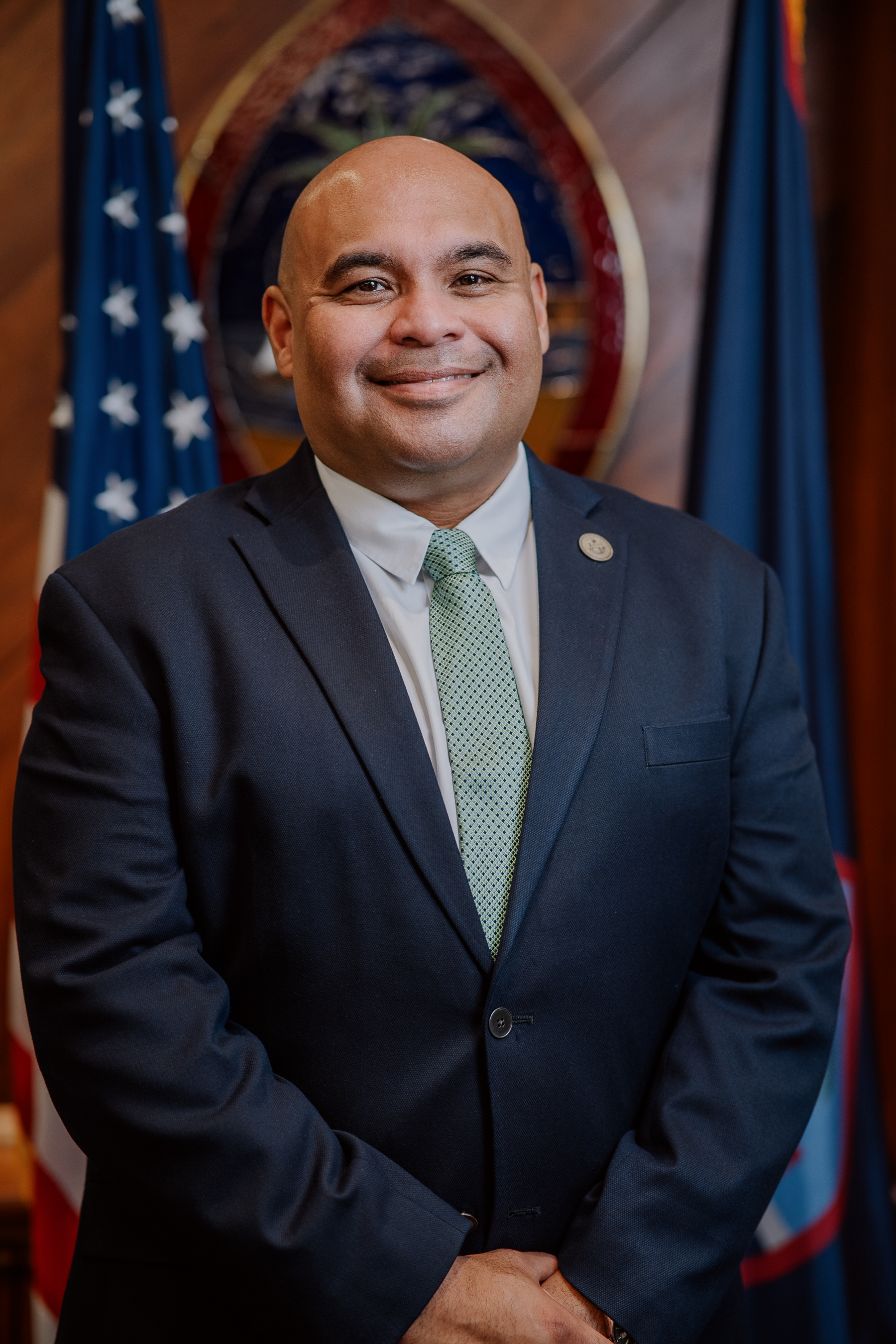
- Official portrait, 2025

10th Lieutenant Governor of Guam
- Incumbent
- Assumed office January 7, 2019
- Governor: Lou Leon Guerrero
- Preceded by: Ray Tenorio

Personal details
- Born: Joshua Franquez Tenorio; December 29, 1973 (age 52)
- Party: Democratic
- Education: University of Guam (BA)

Joshua Franquez Tenorio (born December 30, 1973) is a Guamanian politician and businessman currently serving as the tenth lieutenant governor of Guam since January 7, 2019. He is the first openly gay lieutenant governor elected in the United States and is a member of the Democratic Party.

== Early life ==
Tenorio is the son of the late Jesus Atoigue Tenorio, a retired telephone man, and Therese Franquez Tenorio, a retired school teacher. His father was killed by a drunk driver in 1994.

He was elected to the Guam Youth Congress in 1989 at the age of 15 and served for three terms, culminating in his election as Speaker of the Guam Youth Congress in 1991. He graduated from the Guam Community College Vocational High School in 1991.

He attended the University of Guam from 1991 to 1996, receiving a BA in political science and history.

== Career ==
Tenorio's career began as legislative assistant to Representative Robert A. Underwood's offices in Guam and Washington, D.C. He served in that role from 1993 to 1998.

Starting in 1998, Tenorio served as deputy chief of staff to Governor Carl T.C. Gutierrez. During that time, Tenorio briefly served as acting director of the Guam Bureau of Statistics and Plans and deputy director of the Bureau of Budget and Management Research.

Tenorio managed response and recovery efforts for Supertyphoon Paka, 2001 Earthquake, Typhoon Chata'an, and Supertyphoon Pongsona as the Governor's Authorized Representative to the Federal Emergency Management Agency (FEMA).

After working for Governor Gutierrez, Tenorio became the executive director for the Democratic Party of Guam from 2003 to 2005. and Judiciary Committee Director under Senator Randy Cunliffe in the Guam Legislature. From 2005 to 2007, he worked as a policy advisor to Senator Benjamin Cruz.

Between 2007 and 2011, Tenorio was an executive in Guam's construction industry and was associate publisher of GU Magazine. During the 2008 United States presidential election, Tenorio served as the caucus campaign manager for Barack Obama.

In 2011, Tenorio was appointed as the director of policy, planning and community relations for the Judiciary of Guam including the Supreme Court of Guam. In 2013, he became the administrator of the courts. During his tenure, Tenorio led efforts to improve the juvenile justice system and expand drug courts. He is a Fellow of the Institute for Court Management at the National Center for State Courts, and is a Certified Court Executive.

In 2017, Tenorio returned to the private sector to serve as the vice president to Guam AutoSpot, a car dealership company.

Tenorio is a volunteer with the Guam/CNMI Committee for the Employers Support of the Guard and Reserve (ESGR) and is a member of the Talofofo Rangers Lions Club of Guam. He previously served as Chairman of the Department of Chamorro Affairs Board of Trustees, Guam Historic Preservation Review Board, Guam Preservation Trust, Pa'a Taotao Tano, and Films By Youth Inside (FYI) Guam Advisory Board.

== Lieutenant governor ==
=== Campaign for lieutenant governor ===
In February 2017, Bank of Guam President Lourdes A. Leon Guerrero officially announced her bid to be the next Governor of Guam. The former senator selected Tenorio to be her running mate in the Democratic primaries. They beat three other tickets (the Aguon/Limtiaco ticket, the Gutierrez/Bordallo ticket, and the Rodriguez/Cruz ticket) with 32% of the primary vote to become the official nominees.

On November 6, 2018, Lou Leon Guerrero was elected as Guam's first female governor and Tenorio as the first openly gay Lieutenant Governor after defeating the Tenorio/Ada Ticket in the general election with 50.7% of the vote.

As Lt. Governor, Tenorio's focus remains on criminal justice improvements and the expansion of evidence based programs in the corrections and mental health systems. This includes an aggressive policy agenda to expand drug treatment programs, reduce youth detentions, and address racial disparities in the justice system.

Tenorio has also led efforts to improve Guam's public infrastructure and regulatory systems. He has statutory oversight over the expenditure of federal entitlements and competitive grant funds.

== 2026 campaign for governor ==
Tenorio filed his gubernatorial candidacy paperwork in December 2023 to succeed Leon Guerrero in the 2026 election. The Pacific Daily News reports that other potential Democratic candidates include Speaker of the Guam Legislature Therese M. Terlaje, Guam senator Joe S. San Agustin, and former senator Dennis Rodriguez. In December 2025, Tenorio announced his running mate is former speaker and current senator Tina Rose Muña Barnes. He lost the primary to current senators are Therese Terlaje and Sabina Perez.

== Personal life ==
Joshua Tenorio is openly gay. He is a distant cousin to his predecessor, Ray Tenorio, whom the Leon Guerrero/Tenorio ticket beat in the 2018 gubernatorial election.

On August 12, 2020, Tenorio announced he tested positive to the COVID-19 virus and has experienced mild symptoms.

== Electoral history ==
Democratic primary results
Party	Candidate	Votes	%
Democratic	Lou Leon Guerrero/Josh Tenorio	8,218	32.14
Democratic	Frank B. Aguon Jr./Alicia Limtiaco	7,958	31.12
Democratic	Carl T.C. Gutierrez/Fred E. Bordallo Jr.	5,609	21.94
Democratic	Dennis G. Rodriguez Jr./David M. Cruz Jr.	3,761	14.71
Democratic	Write-ins	22	0.09
Total votes		25,568	100.0

Guamanian gubernatorial election, 2018
Party	Candidate	Votes	%
Democratic	Lou Leon Guerrero/Josh Tenorio	18,258	50.79
Republican	Ray Tenorio/Tony Ada	9,487	26.39
Democratic	Frank Aguon/Alicia Limtiaco (write-in)	8,205	22.82
Total votes		35,950	66.83

Party political offices
Preceded by Gary Gumataotao	Democratic nominee for Lieutenant Governor of Guam; 2018, 2022	Succeeded by Sabina Perez
Political offices
Preceded by Ray Tenorio	Lieutenant Governor of Guam; 2019–present	Incumbent
