= 1998 Guam general election =

- November 3, 1998
- Gubernatorial election
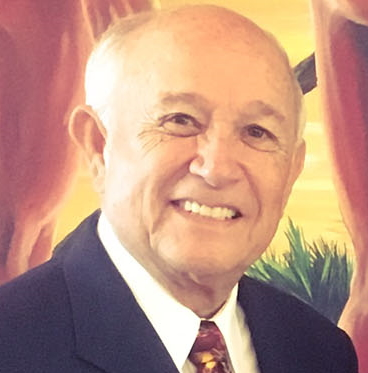

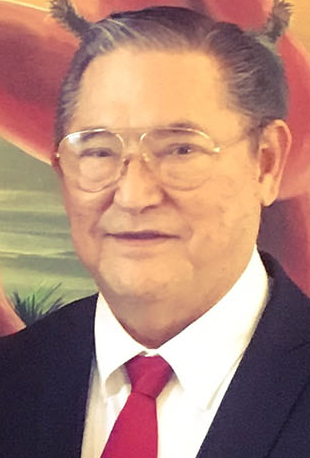
Nominee	Carl Gutierrez	Joseph Franklin Ada
Party	Democratic	Republican
Running mate	Madeleine Bordallo	Felix Perez Camacho
Popular vote	24,250	21,200
Percentage	51.88%	45.35%
Governor before election
Carl Gutierrez
Democratic
Elected Governor
Carl Gutierrez
Democratic

General elections were held in Guam on November 3, 1998. A Democratic Party primary was held to decide the party's gubernatorial candidates on 7 September.

== Governor ==
Incumbent Democrat Carl Gutierrez was re-elected to his second term. This was the last time a Democrat won statewide office on Guam until 2018, when Lou Leon Guerrero won the gubernatorial election over Republican lieutenant governor Ray Tenorio.

=== Primary election ===
==== Democratic ====
Candidate	Running mate	Votes	%
Carl Gutierrez	Madeleine Bordallo	16,794	51.00
Tom Ada	Lou Leon Guerrero	9,360	28.42
Angel Santos	Pedo Terlaje	6,777	20.58
Total		32,931	100.00
Source: GEC

=== General election ===
Candidate	Running mate	Party	Votes	%
Carl Gutierrez	Madeleine Bordallo	Democratic Party	24,250	51.88
Joseph Franklin Ada	Felix Perez Camacho	Republican Party	21,200	45.35
Write-ins			1,294	2.77
Total			46,744	100.00
Valid votes			46,744	96.05
Invalid/blank votes			1,922	3.95
Total votes			48,666	100.00

== Legislature ==
=== Results ===
Candidate	Party	Votes	Notes
Frank Aguon	Democratic Party	27,752	Elected
Eddie Baza Calvo	Republican Party	27,187	Elected
Simon A. Sanchez	Republican Party	23,938	Elected
Kaleo Moylan	Republican Party	23,721	Elected
Ben Pangelinan	Democratic Party	23,316	Elected
Antonio R. Unpingco	Republican Party	22,729	Elected
Mark Forbes	Republican Party	22,629	Elected
Larry F. Kasperbauer	Republican Party	22,425	Elected
Alberto A. Lamorena	Republican Party	22,181	Elected
Carlotta A. Leon Guerrero	Republican Party	22,056	Elected
Marcel G. Camacho	Republican Party	21,596	Elected
Joanne M. Brown	Republican Party	20,655	Elected
John C. Salas	Republican Party	19,924	Elected
Tony Blaz	Republican Party	19,084	Elected
Eulogio Bermudes	Democratic Party	19,002	Elected
Source: Shuster

== Delegate ==
=== Results ===
Candidate	Party	Votes	%
Robert A. Underwood	Democratic Party	34,179	74.22
Manuel Q. Cruz	Republican Party	10,763	23.37
Write-ins		1,111	2.41
Total		46,053	100.00
