= Women in Guam History =

2019 book on women in Guam

Famalao’an Guåhan: Women In Guam History
- Cover of the book's second printing
- Language: English
- Genre: Women's history
- Publisher: Guampedia
- Publication date: March 2019
- Publication place: Guam
- Pages: 96
- ISBN: 9780984860340

Famalao’an Guåhan: Women In Guam History is a 2019 publication highlighting the lives of 28 notable women who contributed to Guam's culture. The book was the second printed publication from Guampedia, a non-profit associated with the University of Guam.

The project "Women in Guam History" started when members of the Guam Humanities Council found that only a handful of the 94 profiles in its encyclopedia were of women. In November 2012, Guampedia presented a poster exhibit called "Women in Guam History" at the Hall of Governors at the Latte of Freedom at Adelup Point.

The 2019 publication was accompanied by a photo exhibit celebrating the 28 women at the Guam Congress Building in Hagåtña.

Fo’na is the lone woman of mythology on the list, and is noted in the culture as the creator of the Chamorro people who are the indigenous people of the Mariana Islands. The sovereign state of Guam is an unincorporated territory of the United States in the Micronesia subregion of the western Pacific Ocean.

== The list in Women in Guam's History ==
Women in Guam History
Name	Image	Birth–Death	Area of achievement	Ref(s)
Maria Palomo Ada		(1903–1996)	Founder of Ada's Market. She and husband Pedro Ada were Guam's first millionaires.	
Elizabeth P. Arriola		(1928–2002)	Six-term Guam senator	
Cecilia Cruz Bamba		(1934–1986)	Guam senator, advocated World War II reparations for the CHamoru/Chamorro indigenous people. Her efforts produced $37 million in compensations for seized lands.	
Concepcion Cruz Barrett		(1915–1993)	Guam senator, business woman.	
Elena Cruz Benavente		(1905–2005)	Master weaver and teacher of traditional weaving.	
Ignacia Bordallo Butler		(1897–1993)	Business woman, civic leader. Her husband became a World War II prisoner of war held by Japan. She collaborated with the Allies of World War II, and was beaten and tortured by the Japanese. She resumed running the family business after WWII and remained active in it until 1982.	
Rosa Roberto Carter		(1929–2010)	President of the University of Guam, who was part of the forced child labor during the Japanese occupation of Guam.	
Beatrice Flores Emsley		(1929–1995)	Japanese WWII prisoner of war; survived being buried alive; later testified before the Guam War Reparations Commission in the late 1980s and early 1990s.	
Fo’na			Female mythological creator of the indigenous people of the Mariana Islands. (also spelled Fu’una)	
Bartola Garrido			CHamoru Educator in Micronesia	
Clotilde Castro Gould		(1930–2002)	Storyteller, educator, language advocate	
Gertrude Costenoble Hornbostel		(1893–1982)	Fluent in the language of the Chamorro people, she assisted with translations of stories, songs, cultural lore. The result of her work resides at the Bishop Museum in Honolulu.	
Agueda Iglesias Johnston		(1892–1977)	Educator who helped establish Guam Liberation Day as a national holiday.	
Emilie Green Johnston		(1924–2011)	Founding member of the Micronesian Area Research Center.	
Mariana Leon Guerrero Lujan		(1914–2006)	Educator who was elected representative from Yona to the 9th and 10th Guam Congress. Also Legislative secretary.	
Gloria Borja Nelson		(1935–2012)	Director Guam Department of Education, championed the rights of senior citizens.	
Clair Raulerson		(1937–2012)	University of Guam biology professor who was a driving force behind documenting all flora of Guam. Curator of the university's herbarium.	
Rosa Aguigui Reyes		(1915–2007)	First woman elected to the Guam Congress. Namesake of the Rosa Aguigui Reyes Memorial Library.	
Candelaria Taitano Rios		(1932–2009)	Educator, public servant, founding member of the Women’s Democratic Party of Guam.	
Maria Anderson Roberto		(b. 1880)	Chaperone for the Native Nurses program in Guam from 1914 to 1924.	
Rita Guevara Sablan		(1926–2003)	Business woman who created Sablan Enterprises.	
Rosa Perez Salas		(1926–1998)	Educator, disability rights advocate.	
Amanda Guzman Shelton		(1906–1982)	Pioneer nurse.	
Laura Maud Thompson		(1905–2000)	American social anthropologist best known for her studies of CHamoru culture.	
Cynthia Johnston Torres		(1911–2001)	Business woman and member of the Legislature of Guam.	
Lucia Fernandez Torres		(1933–2007)	Master weaver	
Maria Arceo Ulloa		(1898–1968)	Teacher and school administrator. Maria Arceo Ulloa Elementary School named in her honor.	
Mary Essie Underwood		(1906–1998)	Helped establish the convent of the Sisters of Mercy in Guam. Along with Bishop Apollinaris William Baumgartner, founded the island’s Catholic School System.	
Lagrimas Untalan		(1911–1997)	Educator and politician, member of the Guam legislature.	
