= 2008 United States Air Force Boeing B-52 crash =

Military aviation accident off Guam

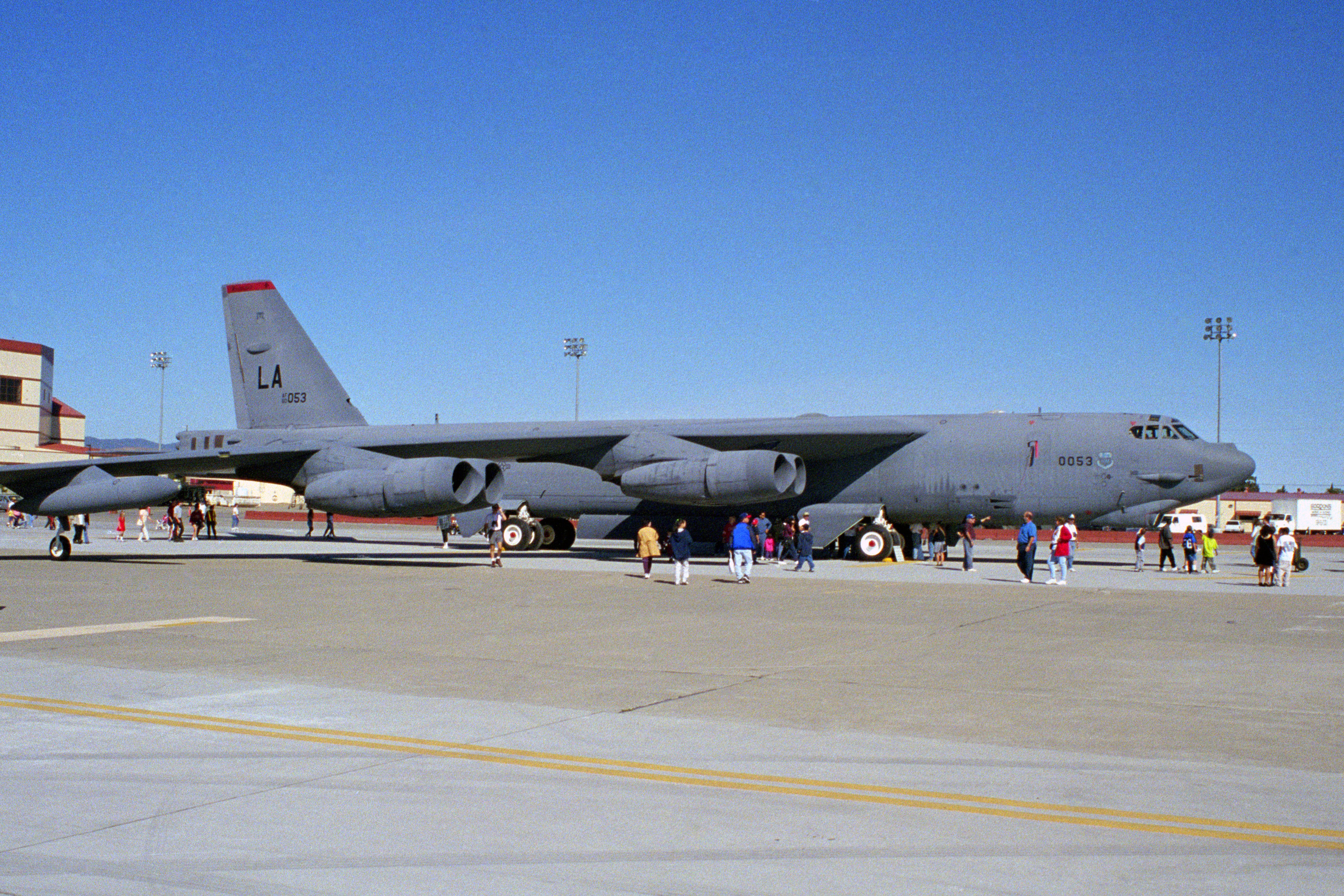
- 60-0053, the Boeing B-52H Stratofortress involved in the accident, seen in 1998

Accident
- Date: 21 July 2008
- Summary: Horizontal stabilizer malfunction
- Site: Pacific Ocean northwest of Apra Harbor, Guam; 13.7407°N 144.2848°E

Aircraft
- Aircraft type: Boeing B-52H Stratofortress
- Aircraft name: Louisiana Fire
- Operator: United States Air Force
- Registration: 60-0053
- Flight origin: Andersen Air Force Base
- Destination: Andersen Air Force Base
- Occupants: 6
- Crew: 6
- Fatalities: 6
- Survivors: 0

On 21 July 2008, a United States Air Force (USAF) Boeing B-52 Stratofortress operating out of Andersen Air Force Base, crashed into the Pacific Ocean during a training flight approximately 30 nautical miles (56 km) northwest of Apra Harbor, Guam. The training flight was to include participation in a local municipal celebration of Liberation Day (the day in 1944 that Guam was Liberated from Japan) in Hagåtña. All six crew members aboard the aircraft were killed and the aircraft was destroyed.

An investigation by the USAF determined that the crash was likely caused by an improper stabilizer trim setting. The investigation was unable to determine conclusively what had caused the horizontal stabilizer trim to be set improperly, but theorized that the most likely cause was an aircraft system malfunction.

== Crash ==
On 21 July 2008, a United States Air Force (USAF) B-52H Stratofortress crashed into the Pacific Ocean approximately 30 nautical miles (56 km) northwest of Apra Harbor, Guam, after taking off from Andersen Air Force Base. The aircraft, named "Louisiana Fire" and with the mission call sign of "RAIDR 21", was about to participate in a flyover for the Liberation Day parade in Hagåtña. It crashed at 9:55 am (local time), 21 July, five minutes before they were scheduled to fly over the parade. Air traffic control radar images indicated that the aircraft appeared to be descending rapidly before disappearing from radar scopes at about 2,000 feet (610 m) of altitude.

On 23 July 2008, the USAF announced that there were no survivors, and that the rescue effort had turned to a recovery mission for four still-missing members of the crew of six.

== Aircraft and crew ==
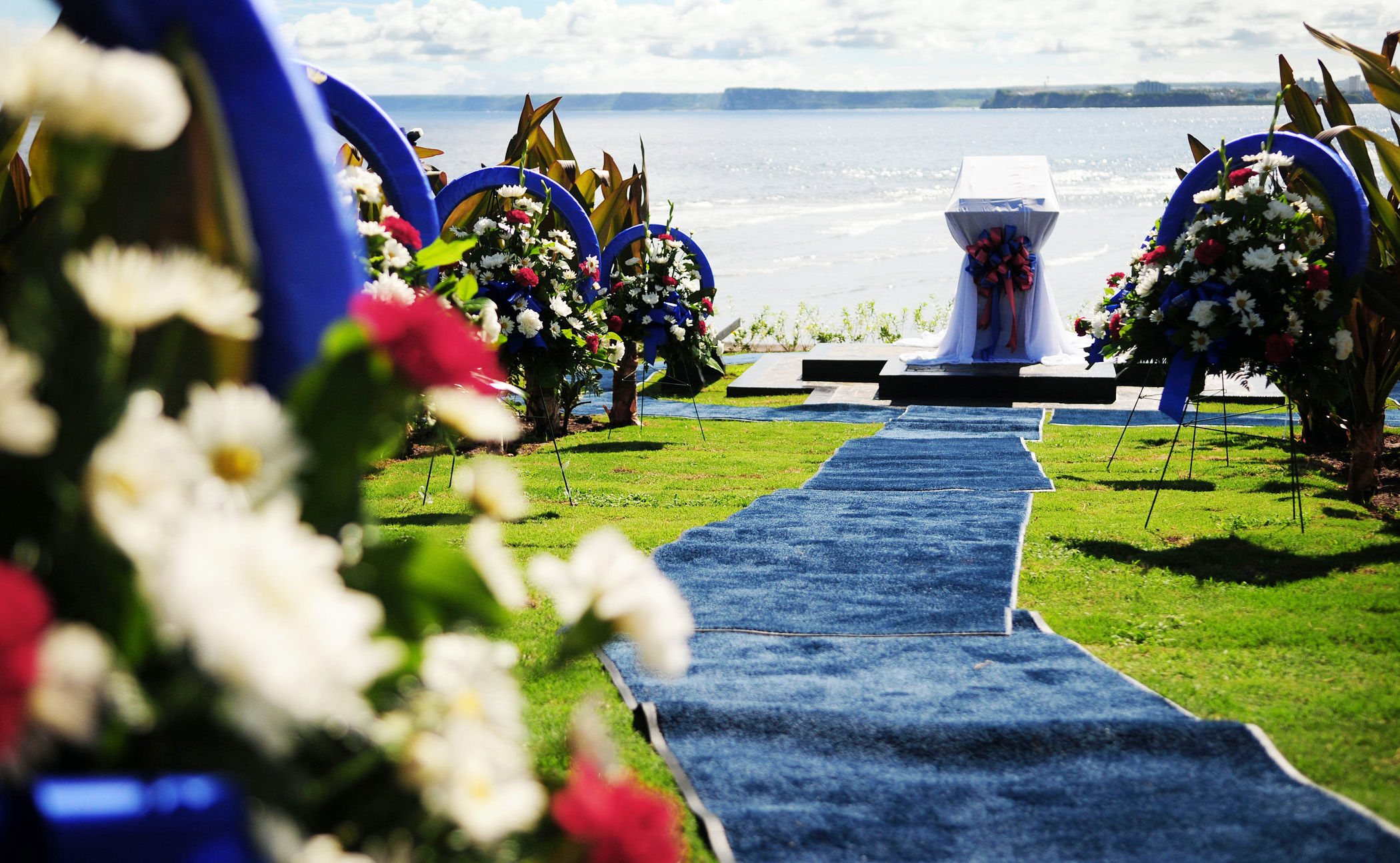
The veiled memorial at Guam's Governors Complex at a memorial ceremony in July 2009

The bomber, assigned to the 20th Bomb Squadron, was, with its crew, on temporary duty at Andersen as part of a four-month rotation. The bomber's unit had replaced Northrop Grumman B-2 Spirit bombers which had been grounded following the loss of one of them on 23 February that year.

The crew of RAIDR 21 were: Major Christopher M. Cooper, aged 33 (aircraft commander), Major Brent D. Williams, aged 37 (radar navigator), Captain Michael K. Dodson, aged 31 (co-pilot), First Lieutenant Joshua D. Shepherd, aged 25 (navigator), First Lieutenant Robert D. Gerren, aged 32 (electronic warfare officer), and Colonel George Martin, aged 51. Martin, a flight surgeon, was the deputy commander of 36th Medical Group at Andersen. He was aboard in the Number 6 crew position to ride along for the Liberation Day "Fly Over". The rest of the crew members were from the 20th Bomb Squadron or the 96th Bomb Squadron at Barksdale Air Force Base, Louisiana. While bodies and remains were recovered from the area, Dodson's and Gerren's remains were not recovered. A memorial service for the crew was held at Arlington National Cemetery on 14 November 2008. A memorial monument was unveiled at Adelup Point on Guam in July 2009.

== Recovery and investigation ==
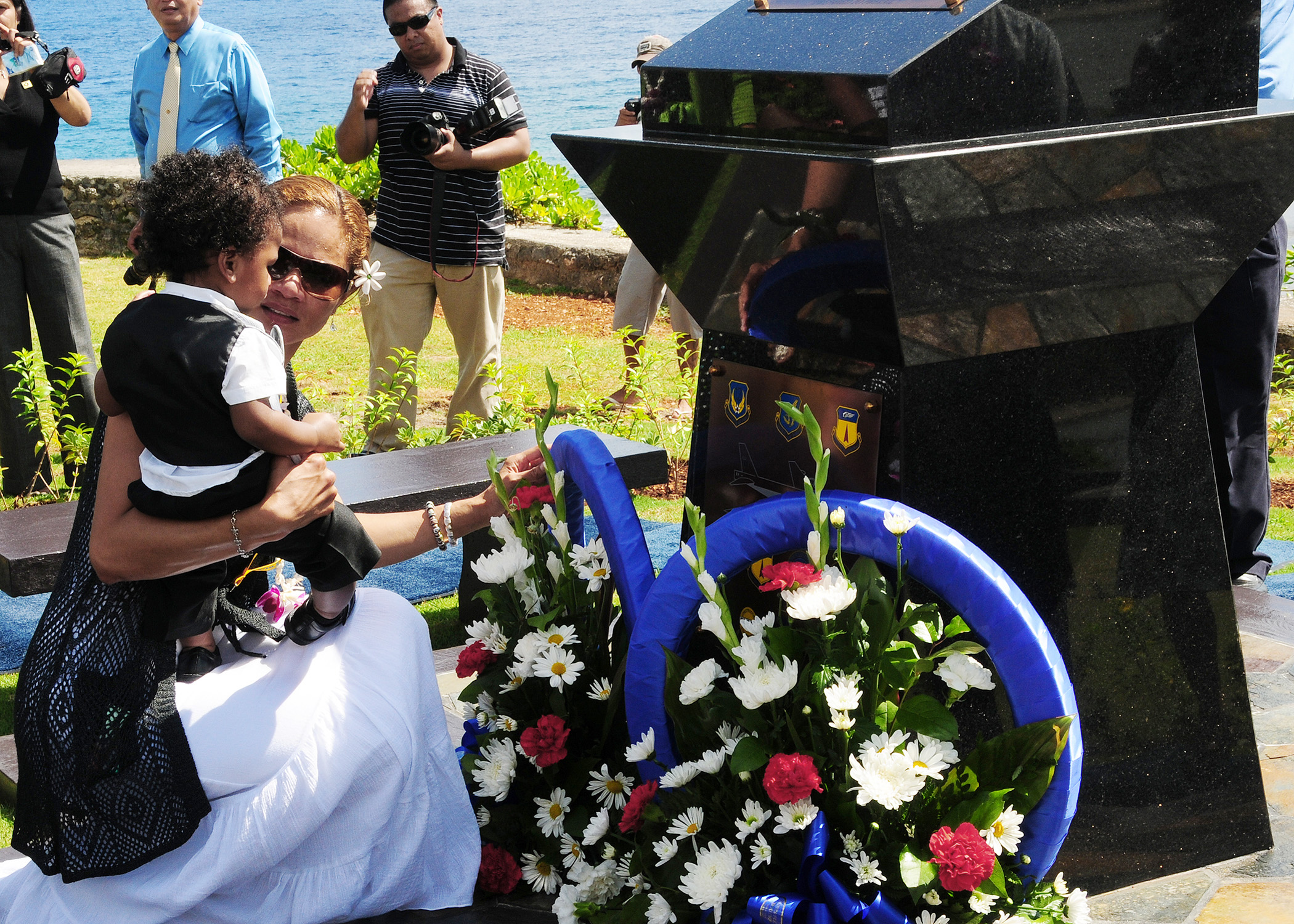
The family of Col. Martin lay a wreath at the Raider 21 memorial at Adelup Point

The USAF worked with the United States Navy and USS John S. McCain to map and retrieve the aircraft's wreckage from the ocean floor. The wreckage did not include a flight data recorder because the aircraft was not equipped with one.

The accident investigation board concluded that the horizontal stabilizer was set at a down angle during the training mission. The cause of the mishap was an improper stabilizer trim setting. Due to the lack of available evidence, no surviving crew members, no radio calls, no other witnesses and lack of a data recorder, the accident investigation board was unable to determine by clear and convincing evidence why the stabilizer trim was mispositioned. The investigation board felt that the most likely cause of this runaway stabilizer trim was a system malfunction that would have led the stabilizer trim to improperly run in a nose-down direction. The improper trim setting occurred somewhere between 14,000 and 10,000 feet (3,000 m) and caused a rapid and uncontrollable descent the experienced crew could not overcome. Based on the descent profile of the mishap aircraft, there was only 34 seconds from the presumed start of the mishap sequence until impact.

The board president, Brigadier General Mark Barrett explained that two factors led to the crash. The first was the "combination of low altitude with a descending left turn of the aircraft". The second was "the late recognition of the serious nature of the situation by the crew". He added, "any experienced air crew could have found it difficult to recognize, assess and recover from the rapidly developing situation involving the stabilizer trim setting." The USAF also conducted a separate safety investigation into the mishap but did not publicly release its findings.
