= 1946 Guamanian legislative election =

Parliamentary elections were held in Guam on 13 July 1946.

== Background ==
Following the end of the Japanese occupation of Guam, the Seventh Guam Congress, elected in 1939 was reconvened in March 1946. In June Governor Charles Alan Pownall was asked to call fresh elections, with the electoral system modified to account for population changes caused by the war.

== Results ==
The elections saw Rosa Aguigui Reyes become the first woman elected to the Congress.

== Aftermath ==
The Eighth Guam Congress met for the first time in Agana on 10 August, using a Quonset hut.
