= Liberation Day (Guam) =

Public holiday in Guam

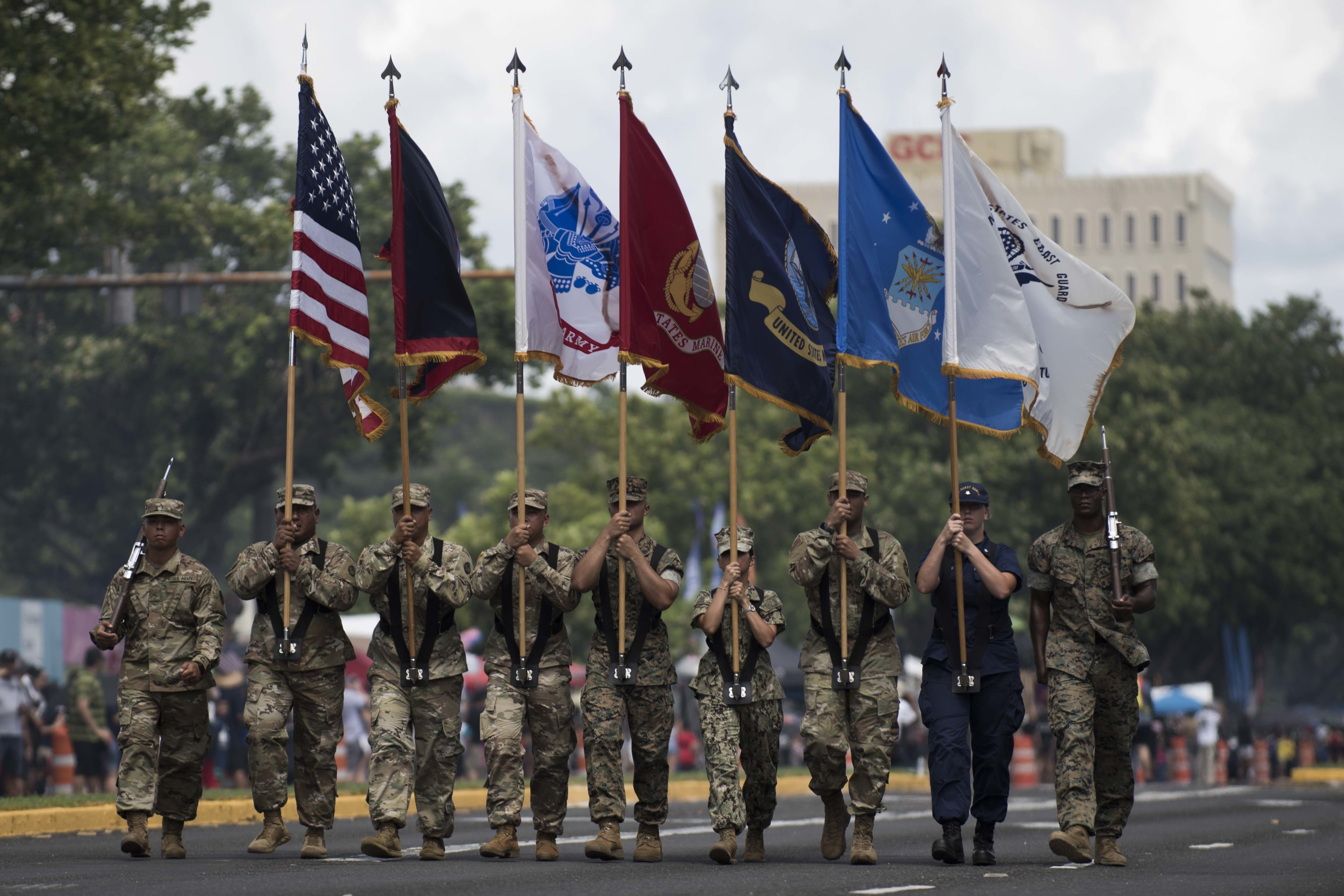
- A joint color guard in the 75th Liberation Day Parade in 2019
- Observed by: Guamanians
- Type: Local
- Significance: Commemorates American landings during the Battle of Guam, which ended the Japanese occupation of Guam (1941-1944)
- Celebrations: Liberation Day Queen contest Liberation Day Parade; Liberation Day Carnival
- Date: July 21
- Next time: 21 July 2026
- Frequency: Annual

Liberation Day on the U.S. territory of Guam is an annual commemoration of the invasion by U.S. military forces on July 21, 1944, which ended the Japanese occupation that had begun in 1941. Begun in 1945, it is Guam's largest celebration. Festivities include a queen contest, summer carnival, fireworks display, and mile-long parade on Marine Corps Drive in Hagåtña from Adelup to Paseo de Susana, as well as solemn memorials and visits to massacre sites. It is organized by the Guam Island Fair Committee.

== Background ==
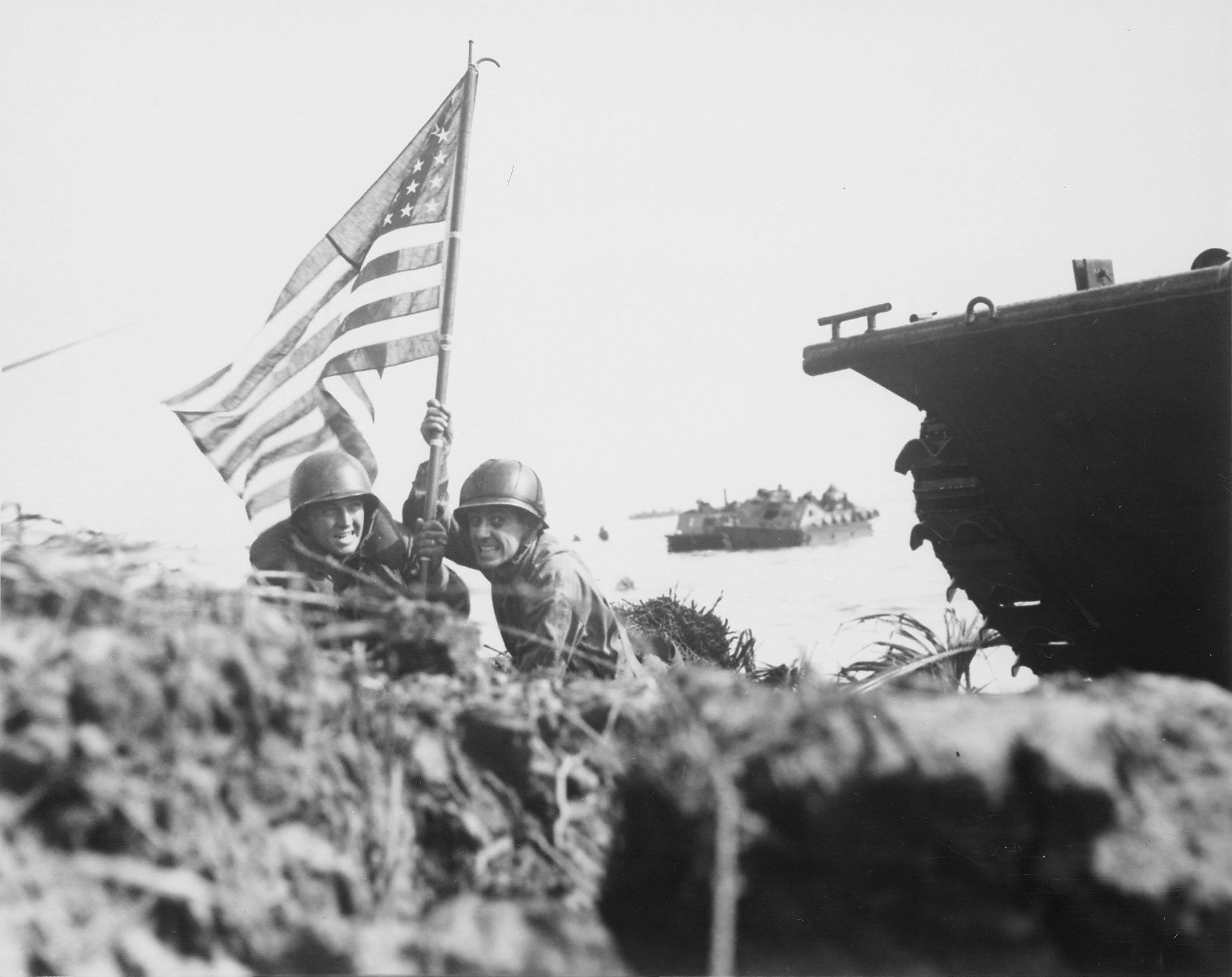
Two U.S. officers plant the American flag on a Guam beach on July 21, 1944

Before the Japanese capture of Guam on December 10, 1941, the Guam Island Fair was celebrated annually, first in the Plaza de España in Hagåtña and later in Bradley Park in Anigua. With tensions rising after the 1931 Japanese invasion of Manchuria starting the Second Sino-Japanese War, a committee formed in 1938 by U.S. Rear Admiral Arthur Japy Hepburn recommended a massive buildup of Guam as an air and submarine base. However, the U.S. balked at the estimated cost. American military dependents and contractors were evacuated weeks before the invasion. While Guamanians were nationals of the United States, they would not become citizens until the passage of the Guam Organic Act of 1950. Practically defenseless, U.S. and territorial forces made token resistance before surrendering to the overwhelming Japanese invasion force, becoming one of five parts of the U.S. captured by the Japanese in World War II, along with the Philippines, Wake Island and the Aleutian Islands of Kiska and Attu.

Renamed Omiya Jima, Japanese for "Great Shrine Island," the island was administered as part of the Greater East Asia Co-Prosperity Sphere by the Imperial Japanese Navy, with the ultimate intent to make it part of the Saipan Branch of the South Seas Bureau. In the early part of the occupation, Japanese forces harassed and tortured Chamorro residents who they suspected of aiding the few American military personnel hiding on Guam, but largely focused on administration aimed at incorporating the island, such as teaching Japanese language in schools. This changed as the Pacific War drew closer and the threat of American attack increased. In early 1944, between 10,000 and 15,000 Chamorros were forced to march with only the belongings they could carry to internment camps in the middle of the island. Most of the male population was forced to build infrastructure and defenses, including the two airfields that became Orote Field and Naval Air Station Agana, which is now Antonio B. Won Pat International Airport. In 1944, the Japanese response to American aircraft's preparatory bombing from June 11 to 13, followed by naval bombardment starting on June 27, was brutal. Japanese massacred dozens of Chamorro civilians in Fena, Merizo, and Yigo. As the invasion neared, Japanese soldiers indiscriminately killed any Chamorros they encountered around the island. The Japanese also raped numerous women around the island. Meanwhile, an unknown number were killed by the American aerial and naval bombardment.

On July 21, 1944 the 3rd Marine Division landed at Asan and the 1st Provisional Marine Brigade landed at Agat to the south, on either side of the strategically important Apra Harbor and Orote Peninsula. Together with the U.S. Army's 77th Infantry Division, and the support of U.S. Navy Seabees, American forces captured the Orote Peninsula by July 29 and pushed north. On August 10, organized Japanese resistance ended, though the last Japanese holdout, Shoichi Yokoi, was not captured until 1972.

== History ==
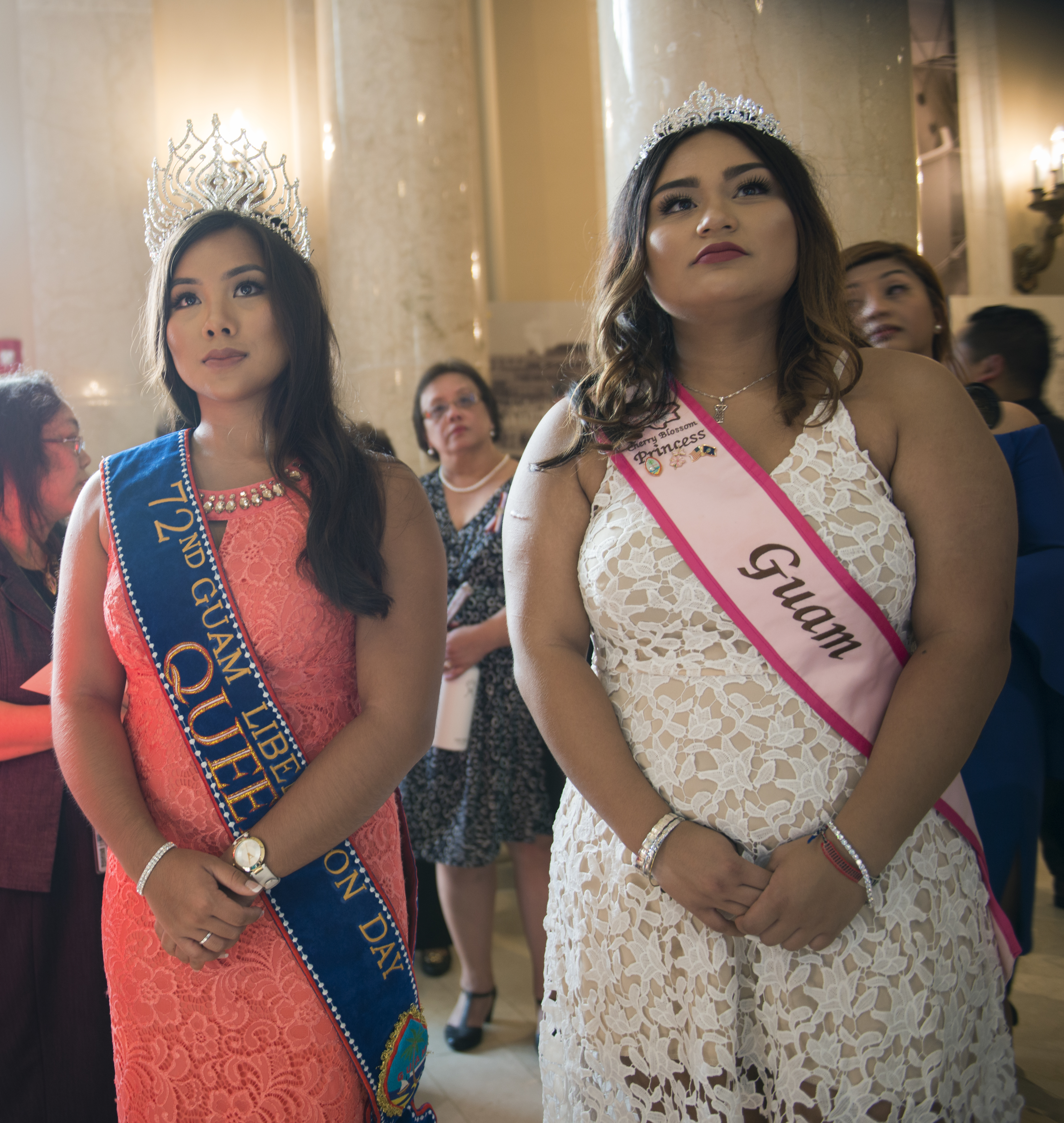
The Liberation Day Queen and Princess at a wreath-laying ceremony commemorating the Anniversary of the Liberation of Guam and the Battle for the Northern Mariana Islands at the Tomb of the Unknown Soldier, Arlington National Cemetery, 2017

In 1945 - the immediate aftermath of the war - prominent Chamorro educator Agueda Iglesias Johnston was instrumental in convincing the island's leadership to support a commemorative celebration of the island's liberation. Johnston had influence with the Army and Navy commands, but had a harder time convincing civilian leaders that a celebration was needed. The military supplied a 100-pound cake, a band, and transportation but Johnston was responsible for a venue. She found an old school with walls and floors made of bamboo and recalled, "When the young people began the jitterbug, I feared some of them would be hurled through the walls. No one was hurt."

The first Liberation Queen was named in 1948. As with the pre-war Guam Island Fair, the Queen is named based on ticket sales, with the runner-up named Liberation Princess.

The Liberation Queen contest, parade, carnival, and religious and memorial services have been constant features of an often multi-day event. However, other kinds of celebrations have been done over the years. In 1950, the Liberation Day program called for a morning Mass, the decoration of graves and war markers, and then an informal dance. In 1952, three days of festivities, with fireworks nightly, included a motorboat parade, horse racing, carabao racing, athletic competitions, and a boxing tournament. Liberation Day festivities have including wrestling matches, agricultural fairs, bicycle races, and pig wrestling, with instances of a Battle of the Bands in 1971 and a circus. The parade route begins at Adelup and typically runs to Paseo de Susana, but in 1976 it went to Camp Asan and in 1983 it went to Hagåtña Pool. While the carnival is typically at Paseo, it has been held at the former Yigo Amusement Park, the Harmon Cliff line, and Tiyan in the past. In 1995, PBS Guam began a yearly tradition of live broadcasts of the parade.

For the milestone 25th anniversary in 1969, a special six-day celebration was held. A Marine Corps band from Honolulu was flown in and a 30-piece Army band performed. The grand marshal was Marine Corps Brig. Gen. Louis H. Wilson Jr., who had been awarded the Medal of Honor for his actions during the Battle of Guam and would later become the Commandant of the Marine Corps.

=== 50th anniversary (1994) ===
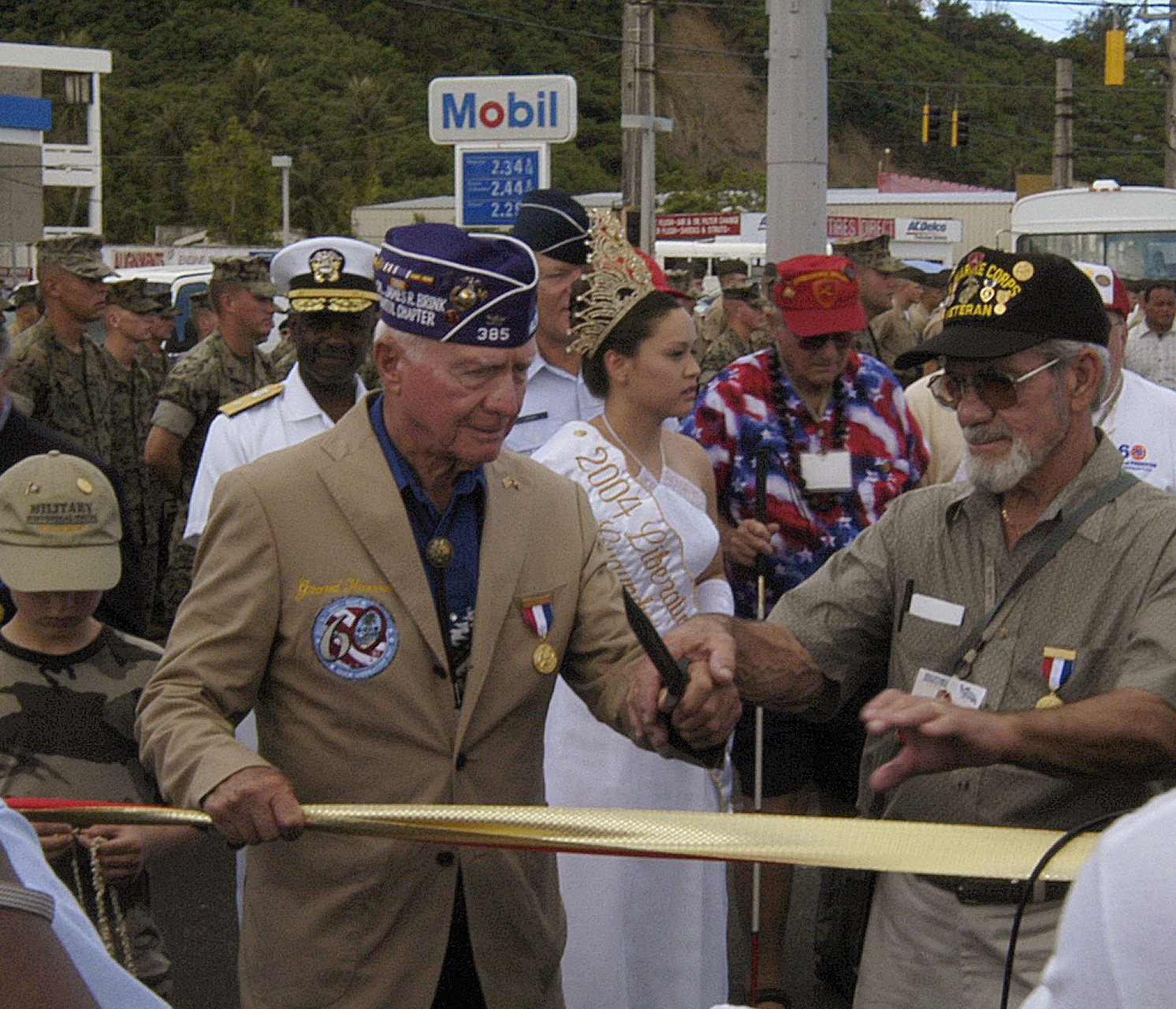
Retired Marine Corps Colonel Fraser West, who commanded a company during the 1944 battle, cuts a ribbon in a ceremony to rename Guam Highway 1 to "Marine Corps Drive" at the 2004 Liberation Day

For the 50th anniversary Liberation Day in 1994, over a thousand veterans of the battle were flown to Guam on special tours, taken out to ceremonies on visiting Naval vessels, and honored at special gatherings. Grand marshal duties were shared by four WWII veterans from Guam who had served in the Army, Marine Corps, Army Air Force, and Navy. Marine Corps Brig. Gen. Edwin H. Simmons, a veteran of the 1944 battle and the former director of the United States Marine Corps History Division, described the scene:

On both sides of Marine Drive there was an unbroken line of Guamanian families camping out on the curbside for the holiday. The families had staked out their places from which to view the goings and comings of the celebration and, most particularly, for the big parade which was to come on the 21st of July. This camping-out is not new; it is a custom that has grown big over the years. Most families had rigged some sort of bright-colored tent, fly or canopy. The unmistakable odor of barbecue was in the air. [...] Military marching units included the Marines, the Navy, the Army, and the Guam National Guard, dressed out as jungle fighters. Early on there was an overflight by a string of Marine Harriers and helicopters. The Filipino and Chinese communities had costumed groups in the parade. There were also fearsome aborigine warriors from Fiji and the Southern Philippines, dragon dancers from Taiwan and Hong Kong, and a contingent of Native Americans. Marchers from the other Mariana islands, including Saipan, were present. The parade, scheduled for three hours, went on for six.

The 2004 Liberation Day marking the 60th anniversary included a rededication ceremony in which Guam Highway 1, the main north–south route, was renamed from "Marine Drive" to "Marine Corps Drive."

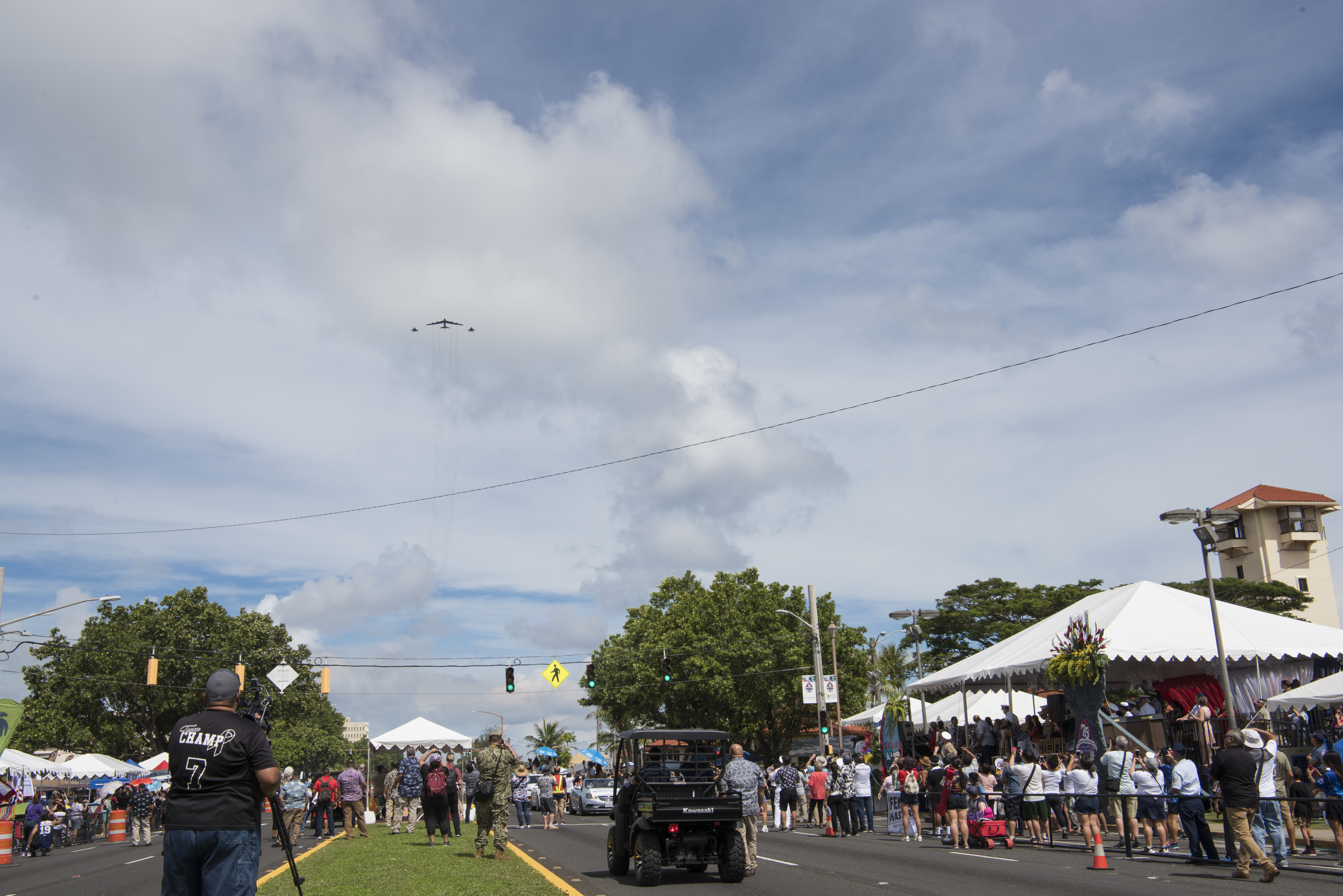
2019 Liberation Day Parade flyover by a B-52 Stratofortress and two F-15 Eagles

In 2008, tragedy struck when a B-52 from Andersen Air Force Base that was preparing for a flyover of the parade crashed into the ocean, with the loss of all six crewmembers. A memorial monument was unveiled at the Governor's Complex on Adelup Point on July 20, 2009.

As the years have gone on, fewer and fewer veterans of the battle have been able to attend Liberation Day festivities. The 75th anniversary Liberation Day in 2019 was attended by only two veterans of the battle and one veteran who assisted with the island's reconstruction, who were named as three of the six grand marshals. Three Chamorro survivors of the occupation were named co-grand marshals. The parade included 91 entries, including from 16 of the 19 villages. Related events included a march to the Manenggon Valley Concentration Camp and many memorial services and musical performances, including by local pop star Pia Mia, the Navy's Pacific Fleet Band, the III Marine Expeditionary Force Band, and traditional Chamorro musicians. Lt. Gov. Joshua Tenorio, who headed the liberation committee, stated, "Many of the wartime survivors have passed away; it's up to us to carry on their legacy."

In 2020, no in-person celebration was held due to concerns about the COVID-19 pandemic in Guam. Mayors' Council of Guam Executive Director Angel Sablan commented, "We already lost a lot of people during our real liberation. It doesn't make sense to lose more lives just to celebrate it." This meant that, for the first time ever, the Liberation Queen retained her title for second year. PBS Guam, in lieu of its normal live parade coverage, broadcast a one-hour Liberation special and re-broadcast the 75th Guam Liberation Day Parade. In January 2021, the Guam National Guard announced that their support to COVID-19 vaccination efforts was named Operation Liberate Guam. It aims to achieve 80% herd immunity by Liberation Day 2021.

== Events ==
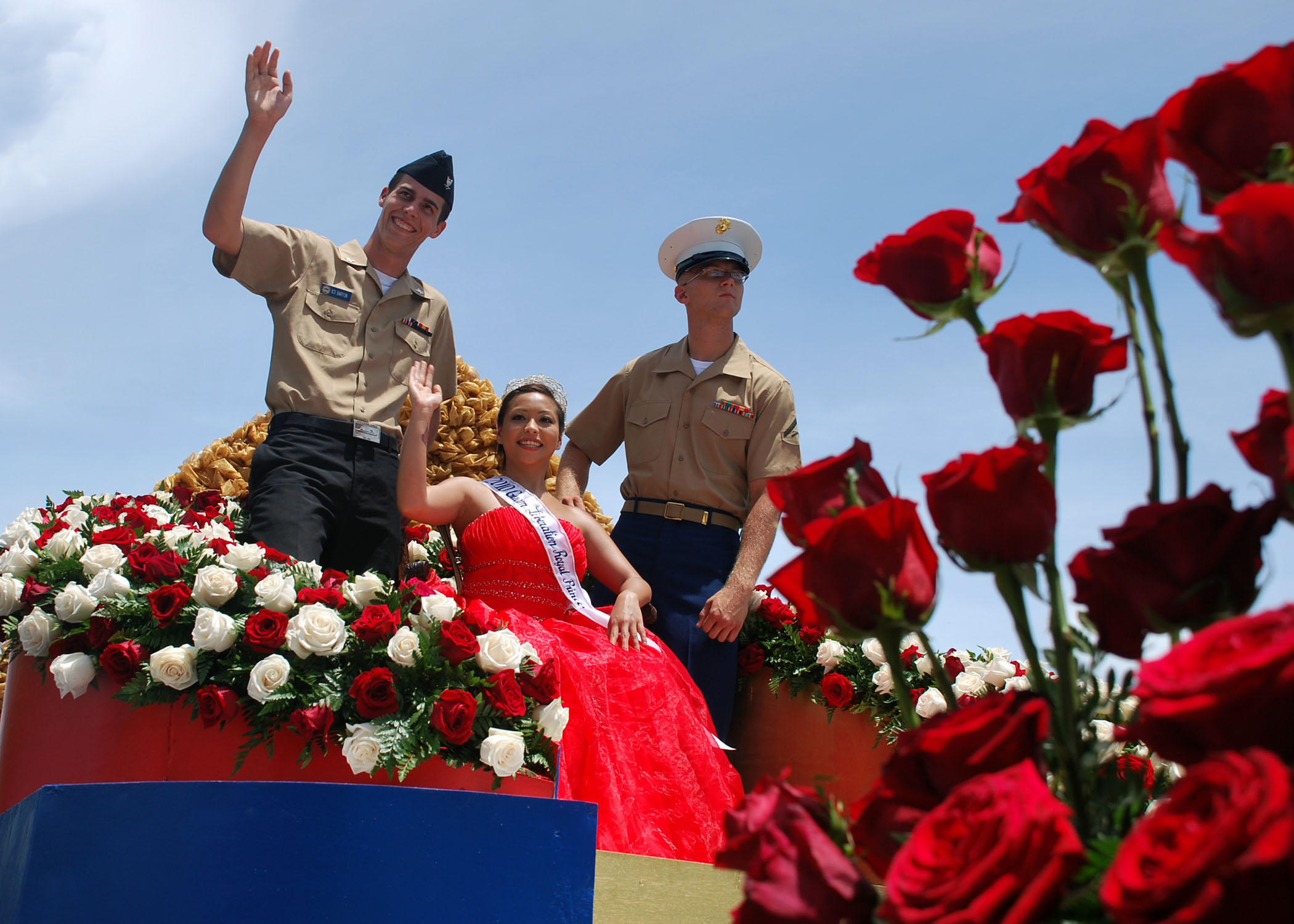
A Sailor and a Marine escort the Royal Princess of Piti on her village's float, 2010

The centerpiece of Liberation Day celebrations is the parade, which includes both civic and commercial floats that are typically related to a declared theme for the year. There are also marches by various groups, particularly military units. The most anticipated floats are by the villages of Guam, which are subject to an islandwide competition. However, some villages have refrained from participating, stating that they would rather spend limited funds on more long-lasting projects. Village floats rely heavily on charitable donations and volunteer labor. The grand marshal, the symbolic leader of the parade, has most often been a occupation survivor or military or political leader. The lack of space along the parade route for all the spectators necessitates a sign-up sheet for parade watching spots that is filled on a first-come basis; some families and businesses camp overnight to ensure that they can reserve a parade-watching spot.

The Guam Carnival, formally the Guam Island Fair, typically opens at Paseo de Susana in late May and runs until early August. It has rides, games, and food stands. In the early 1980s, the carnival was engulfed in controversy over who gets the lucrative concessions. In 1982, the Attorney General of Guam upheld a 1980 law stating that concession must go to nonprofit groups. However, in 1983, when the carnival was held at Yigo Amusement Park, then-Speaker Carl Gutierrez got a second carnival approved at the traditional location of Paseo. This led parade organizers to reroute to the Agana Pool and Agana Shopping Center so it did not attract visitors to the unsanctioned carnival at Paseo. The role of gambling at the carnival is a perennial source of disagreement. Guam banned most forms of gambling in 1977, with the sole exception being at the Liberation Carnival, with the proceeds funding Liberation Day activities. In 2017, lawmakers closed this loophole, corresponding to a drop in Carnival attendees and revenue. In 2019, the ban was lifted and gambling was once again allowed. However, the Guam Department of Revenue and Taxation proposed using chips, rather than allowing cash, to allow easier accounting.

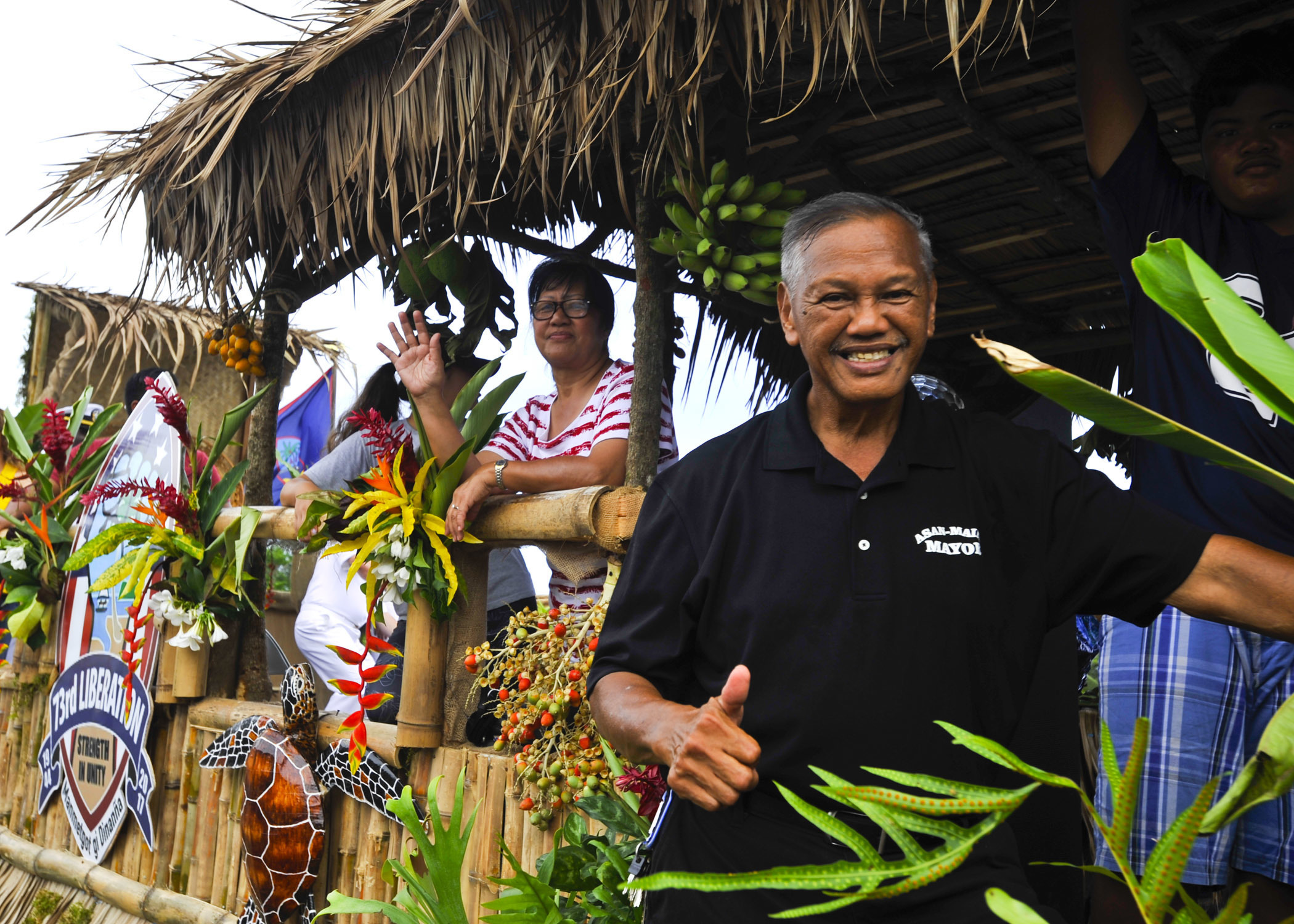
The mayor of Asan gives a thumbs up from his village's 2017 float

Memorials and ceremonies have changed greatly over the years. They may include events held a week before or after actual Liberation Day. In the 2010s, they have included:

- Asan Landing Memorial Ceremony at the Asan Invasion Beach and following Mass at Asan's Nino Perdido y Sagrada Familia Church
- Visits to the Faha and Tinta massacre sites in Merizo
- Walks to the Fena Cave massacre site and memorial service at Old Agat Cemetery
- Mass at the Sumay Cemetery
- Memorial ceremony at the Raider 21 monument at Adelup for the crew lost in the 2008 B-52 crash
- Visit to the Chaqui'an Massacre Site in Yigo
