= Guampedia =

Guam history and culture organization

Guampedia is a non-profit encyclopedic organization on the history and culture of Guam.

== History ==
The Guampedia project was started in 2002 by the Guam Humanities Council with funding from the National Endowment for the Humanities and the United States Department of the Interior. It published 350 encyclopedia entries in April 2008. In 2009, it became affiliated with the University of Guam and was registered as a non-profit organization. It published a book, Women in Guam History in 2019.
