= Adelup Point =

Cape in Hagåtña, Guam

Adelup Point Punta Adilok (Chamorro)
- Promontory
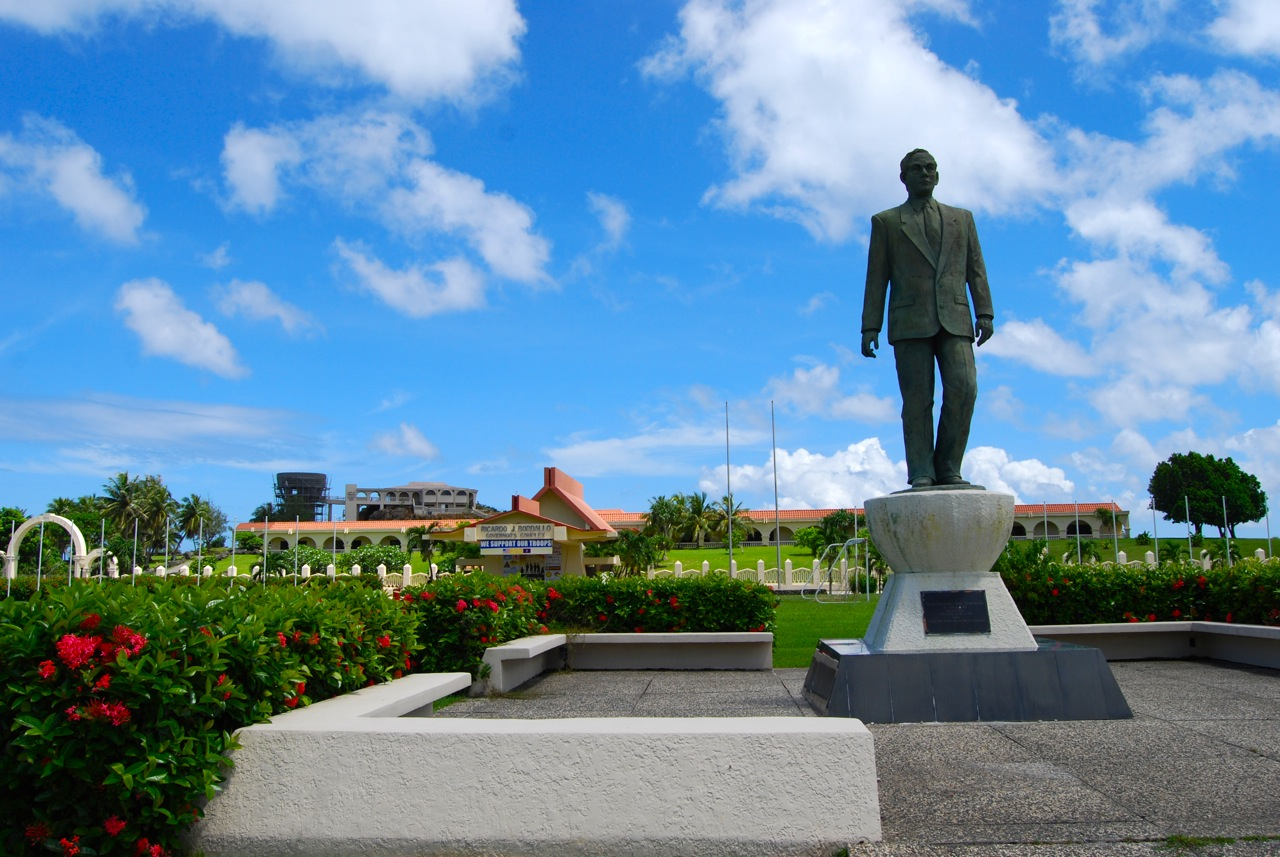
- The Ricardo J. Bordallo Governor's Complex atop Adelup Point, 2009

- Location within Guam
- Coordinates: 13.4797°N 144.7296°E
- Website: governor.guam.gov

Adelup Point (Chamorro: Punta Adilok) is a limestone promontory in Hagåtña, Guam that extends into the Philippine Sea and separates Asan Bay from Hagåtña Bay. It has been the site of the Ricardo J. Bordallo Governor's Complex since 1990. Adelup is therefore a metonym for the Office of the Governor of Guam.

== Geology ==
Adelup Point is composed of Mariana limestone, specifically Quaternary reef facies. Qtmr reef facies are "massive, generally compact, porous, and cavernous white limestone of reef origin, especially along cliff faces, made up mostly of corals in position of growth in matrix of encrusting calcareous algae." The coastline to the east and west comprises deposits of beach sand and gravel. East of the promontory is the mouth of the Fonte River, located in the residential district of Anigua.

== History ==
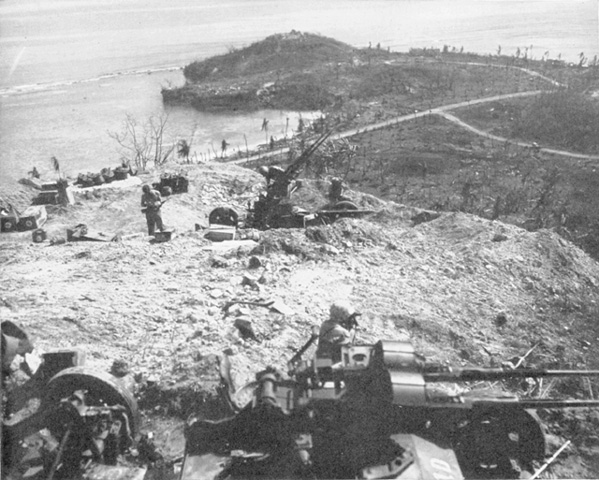
U.S. Marine Corps' 14th Defense Battalion overlooking the bombarded Adelup Point during the 1944 Battle of Guam

Prior to the Japanese invasion of Guam in 1941, the highest point on Adelup was the location of the "Atkins-Kroll house". Atkins, Kroll, and Co. was a San Francisco-based trading company. Atkins-Kroll was a major exporter of copra from Guam. After the invasion, the Atkins-Kroll house was used by the Japanese military commander for recreation.

During the Japanese occupation of Guam from 1941 to 1944, Adelup Point was extensively fortified by the Imperial Japanese Navy, including with a battery of coastal guns. Adelup Point was the eastern edge of the Asan Invasion Beach used by U.S. forces as the northern invasion beach on July 21, 1944 that began the Liberation of Guam. The site of fierce fighting, the promontory was captured by the end of the invasion day. There are seven pillboxes, caves, and other Japanese defensive works identified on Adelup. One work was dug under the large concrete foundation of the Atkins-Kroll House. During the battle, it became an American command post.

In early 1945, the headquarters of the 5th Naval Construction Brigade under Commodore William O. Hiltabidle was located at Adelup. Later, a military officers' club was established at Adelup, apparently on the Atkins-Kroll building foundation. For a period in the 1960s into the 1970s, Adelup Elementary School provided schooling for grades 1-6. In 1978, War in the Pacific National Historical Park was established. The western shore and tip of Adelup Point fall within the Park. Adelup was once part of Asan-Maina before being annexed into Hagåtña so that Hagåtña remains the seat of the Government of Guam. In 1994, the Guam Museum, which had not had a permanent home since its previous building was destroyed during the American liberation of Guam, opened an exhibition hall at Adelup. It operated here until 2002, when it was damaged by Typhoon Chataan and Typhoon Pongsona, and forced to close.

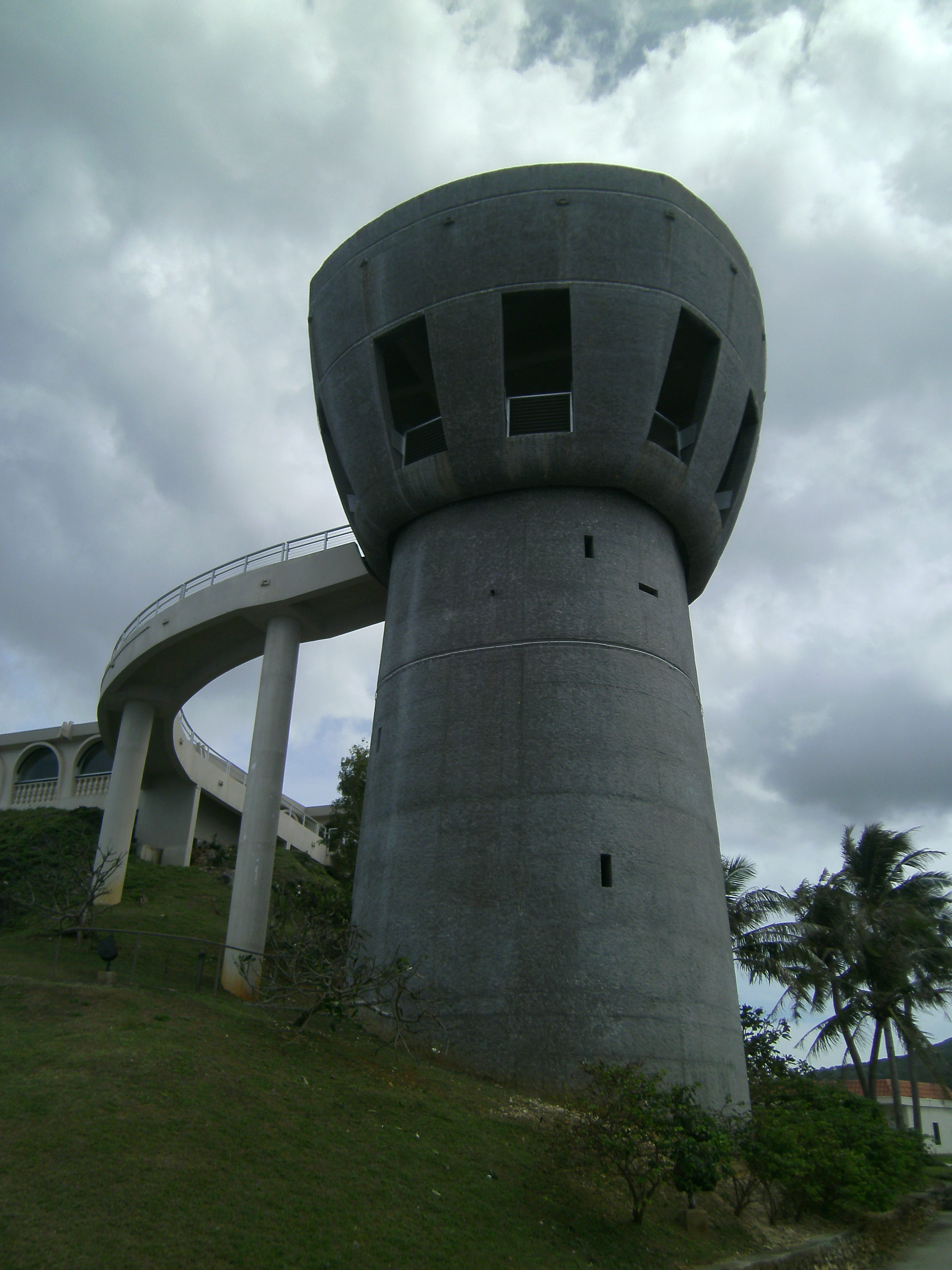
The Latte of Freedom at Adelup is 80 feet (24 m) tall

In March 2010, the 80 feet (24 m)-tall Latte of Freedom of opened at Adelup as a viewing platform over the adjacent waters. Though greatly changed from its original concept, it is meant to embody the strength of CHamoru culture with the shape of the latte stone. The Latte of Freedom is located next to the site of the old Guam Museum, which was converted into a Hall of Governors facility, commemorating the governors since the signing of the Guam Organic Act of 1950.

== Features ==
Besides the offices of the Governor and some government agencies, variously WWII-related fortifications, the Latte of Freedom, and the Hall of Governors, Adelup also contains:

- a WWII-era Japanese Type 10 120 mm AA gun used for coastal defense, with nearby small Shinto shrine and torii gate in promotion of peace
- bronze statues erected in 1994 of two Chamorro scouts leading U.S. Marines after their landing on Guam
- a grassy field used for sports and occasional military helicopter training by the Guam Army National Guard
- a memorial monument for the crew lost in the 2008 B-52 crash off the coast of Guam
- a 2018 replica of The Lone Sailor, sponsored by the United States Navy Memorial, in commemoration of the role of the Navy, Marine Corps, and Coast Guard in Operation New Life, the care and processing of about 110,000 South Vietnamese refugees following the Fall of Saigon in 1975. The statue looks north towards Ritidian Point, is located next to a large replica of the Seal of Guam and is surrounded by 19 benches representing the Villages of Guam.
- Adelup is the start point for the annual Liberation Day Parade
