= Cecilia Cruz Bamba =

Cecilia Cruz Bamba (November 1934 - September 29, 1986) was an indigenous Chamorro woman from Guam who was a senator, businesswoman and community leader. As a senator, Bamba introduced legislation for the establishment of the War Reparations Commission and was the first indigenous woman from Guam to testify before the United States Congress about wartime atrocities.

== Biography ==
Bamba was born in Hagåtña to Rosa Rosaria and Jose Leon Guerrero Cruz. She and her brother were raised by their grandmother after both of their parents died during the Japanese occupation of Guam.

In 1952, Bamba started the Guam Woman's Club. She also founded the Guam Memorial Hospital Volunteers Association in 1965. She served on and chaired many community and social organizations, including the Agana Heights Women's Group, the Guam Girl Scouts Council, the Guam Business and Professional Women's Club, the Guam Beautification Association and the Federation of Asian Women's Association. She also ran businesses including Cecilia Bamba Insurance, Chamorrita Enterprises, Oceania Consultants, and the Bamba Corporation.

In December 1978, she was elected to the 14th Guam Legislature, where she worked for recognition of the need for war reparations. She met with civilian war survivors to collect and record their stories. As a senator, Bamba introduced the legislation to create the War Reparations Commission. She testified in front of the US Congress in 1983 advocating for war reparations for Guam and in doing so became the first Chamorro woman to testify in Congress.

Bamba died of cancer in California in 1986.

== Personal life ==
When she was 16 years old, she married George Mariano Bamba; the couple had ten children together. Her husband died in 1978.
