= Chaqui'an Massacre Site =

- U.S. National Register of Historic Places
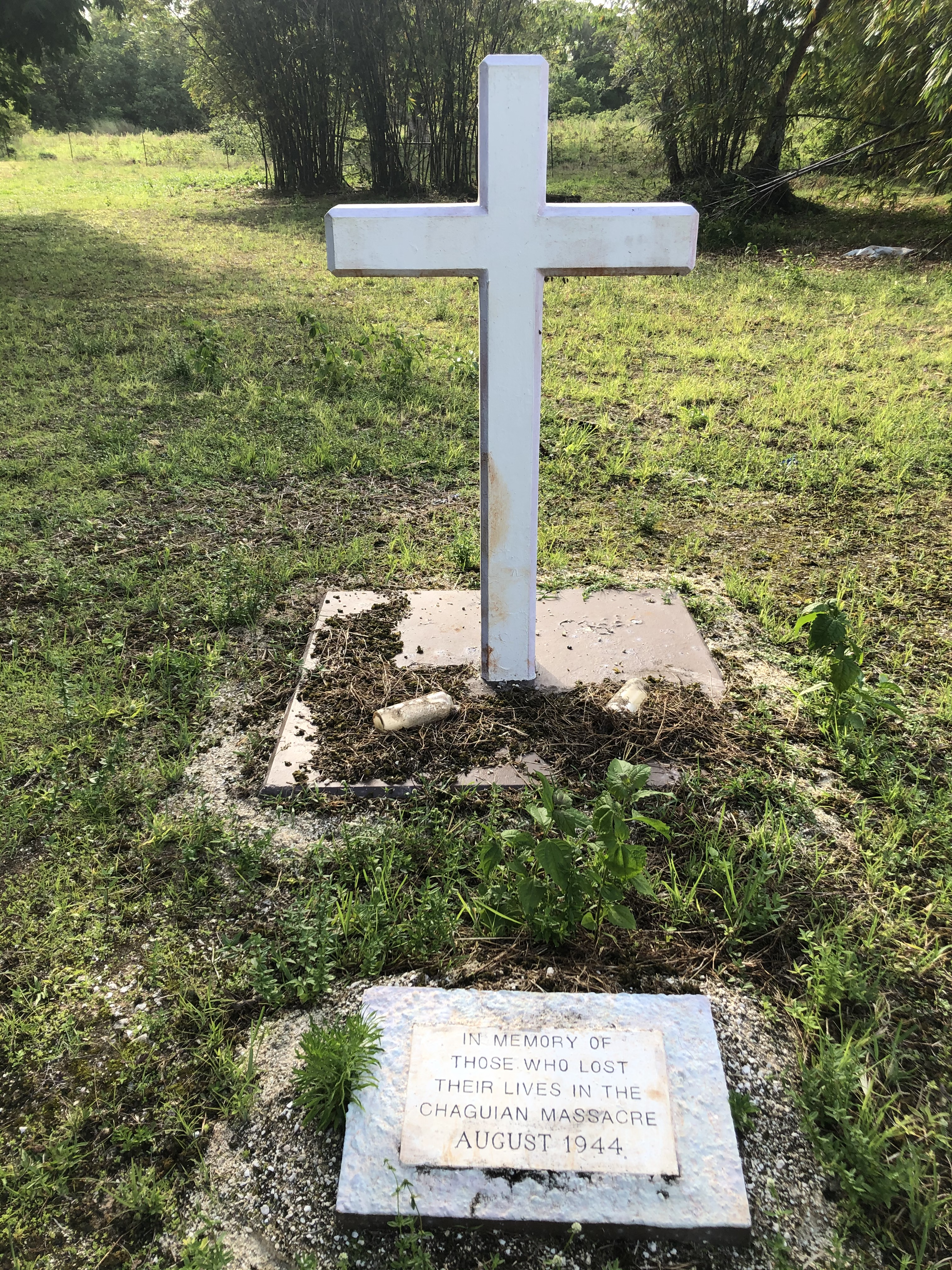
- Chaqui'an Massacre Site Memorial as seen on June 22, 2020.

- Location within Guam Location within Oceania
- Location: Chalan Emsley, Yigo, Guam
- Coordinates: 13.571291°N 144.888899°E
- Area: 1.94 acres (0.79 ha)
- NRHP reference No.: 16000129
- Added to NRHP: April 12, 2016

Chaqui'an Massacre Site, at Chalan Emsley in Yigo on Guam, was the site of a massacre in 1944 by Japanese soldiers of 45 native Chamorro men and boys. The victims were from 15 to 76 years old, and were dressed in civilian clothes. They were tied and were beheaded. The site, a 1.94 acres (0.79 ha) area, was listed on the National Register of Historic Places in 2016.

The NRHP nomination states:

Chagui'an represents the intense suffering and hardship endured by the indigenous population (Chamorros) of the U.S. Unincorporated territory of Guam during the 31 month Japanese wartime occupation of the island. Of the many incidents of Japanese military brutality on Guam, the largest known single act of violence is the beheading of 45 Chamorros by the Imperial Japanese Army at Chagui'an. The massacre site exemplifies the atrocities committed on Micronesian populations in the Pacific Theater of Operations and epitomizes the tragic extremes that can be inflicted on small, marginalized, native populations without political authority or the prerogative of military sanction in global conflicts. Chagui'an is one of only a handful of war-related massacres of civilians that occurred on U.S. soil during World War II.
