= Agueda Johnston =

Chamorro educator

Agueda Johnston (December 12, 1892, Hagåtña – December 30, 1977) was a Chamorro educator, known as the "Mother of Guam's Education". She was instrumental for Guam's Liberation Day to be recognized by the authorities of the island as a festive holiday.

Johnston was inducted into the Guam Educators Hall of Fame in 1982.

== Bibliography ==
- DeLisle, Christine Taitano (2022-01-06). Placental Politics: CHamoru Women, White Womanhood, and Indigeneity under U.S. Colonialism in Guam. UNC Press Books. ISBN 978-1-4696-5271-9.
- Camacho, Keith L. (2011-03-31). Cultures of Commemoration: The Politics of War, Memory, and History in the Mariana Islands. University of Hawaii Press. ISBN 978-0-8248-6031-8.
- Goetzfridt, Nicholas J. (2011-03-31). Guahan: A Bibliographic History. University of Hawaii Press. ISBN 978-0-8248-6030-1.
- Matos, Christine De; Ward, Rowena (2012). Gender, Power, and Military Occupations: Asia Pacific and the Middle East Since 1945. Routledge. ISBN 978-0-415-89183-7.
