= Rosa Aguigui Reyes =

Guamanian educator and politician

Member of the Guam Congress
- In office 1946–1948

Personal details
- Born: 7 February 1915; Merizo, Guam
- Died: 29 January 2007 (aged 91)

Rosa Aguigui Reyes (7 February 1915 – 29 January 2007) was a Guamanian educator and politician. In 1946 she was the first woman elected to the Guam Congress, serving until 1948.

== Biography ==
Aguigui Reyes was born in Merizo in 1915, the daughter of Bienvenida Mata Tyquiengco and Ignacio Babauta Aguigui. She was educated at Agana High School, and began teaching at Merizo Martyrs Elementary School in 1933. In 1946 she married Ignacio Mendiola Reyes.

After the liberation of Guam at the end of World War II, elections to the Guam Congress were held in July 1946. Aguigui Reyes was a successful candidate, becoming the first female member of the Congress. She served for one term, after which she entered the new College of Guam, graduating in 1954 with an associate's degree in education. She subsequently attended the University of Hawaiʻi and continued working as a teacher at Merizo Martyrs Elementary School, where she stayed for 31 years. She also served as principal of F. Q. Sanchez School in Umatac for eleven years.

She died on 29 January 2007 aged 91. The library in Merizo was named the Rosa Aguigui Reyes Memorial Library after her.
