= 2026 in Guam =

- Decades: 2000s; 2010s; 2020s
- See also: History of Guam; Historical outline of Guam; List of years in Guam; 2026 in the United States

Events from 2026 in Guam.

== Incumbents ==
- Governor: Lou Leon Guerrero
- Lieutenant Governor: Josh Tenorio

== Events ==
- January 9 – The Guam Senate votes unanimously to urge the federal government to stop deep-sea mining plans near the territory.
- April 11 – A typhoon watch and state of emergency is declared ahead of Typhoon Sinlaku, which makes landfall on April 14.
- November 3 – 2026 Guam elections
  - 2026 Guam gubernatorial election: Republican Vicente Ada wins the election, beating Democrat Therese Terlaje.
  - 2026 United States House of Representatives election in Guam: Alicia Limtiaco wins the election, beating incumbent James Moylan and flipping the seat to Democrats.

== Holidays ==
- January 1 – New Year's Day
- May 26 – Memorial Day
- July 4 – Independence Day
- September 7 – Labor Day
- November 11 – Veterans Day
- November 26 – Thanksgiving
- December 8 – Lady of Camarin Day
- December 25 – Christmas Day
