= 2019 in Guam =

- Decades: 1990s; 2000s; 2010s; 2020s
- See also: History of Guam; Historical outline of Guam; List of years in Guam; 2019 in the United States

Events from 2019 in Guam.

== Incumbents ==
- Governor: Eddie Baza Calvo (Until January 7); Lou Leon Guerrero onwards
- Lieutenant Governor: Ray Tenorio (Until January 7); Josh Tenorio onwards

== Events ==
- April 4 – Governor Lou Leon Guerrero signs a bill into law, legalizing the recreational use of cannabis.
- October 7 – U.S. president Donald Trump approved an emergency declaration and evacuation orders for Guam ahead of Typhoon Hagibis.
