= 2024 in Guam =

- Decades: 2000s; 2010s; 2020s
- See also: History of Guam; Historical outline of Guam; List of years in Guam; 2024 in the United States

Events from 2024 in the Guam.

== Incumbents ==
- Governor: Lou Leon Guerrero
- Lieutenant Governor: Josh Tenorio

== Events ==
- 9 March – 2024 Guam Republican presidential caucuses

== Holidays ==
- 1 January - New Year's Day
- 15 January - Martin Luther King Jr. Day
- 19 February – Presidents' Day
- 7 March - History of Guam and Chamorro people
- 27 May - Memorial Day
- 19 June – Juneteenth
- 4 July - Independence Day
- 21 July - Liberation Day
- 2 September - Labor Day
- 2 November – All Souls' Day
- 11 November - Veterans Day
- 28 November - Thanksgiving
- 8 December – Lady of Camarin Day
- 25 December - Christmas Day

== Deaths ==
- 16 October: Paul McDonald Calvo, 90, politician, governor (1979–1983) and senator (1971–1975).
