= 2025 in Guam =

- Decades: 2000s; 2010s; 2020s
- See also: History of Guam; Historical outline of Guam; List of years in Guam; 2025 in the United States

Events from 2025 in Guam.

== Incumbents ==
- Governor: Lou Leon Guerrero
- Lieutenant Governor: Josh Tenorio

== Holidays ==
- 1 January - New Year's Day
- 15 January - Martin Luther King Jr. Day
- 19 February – Presidents' Day
- 7 March - History of Guam and Chamorro people
- 26 May - Memorial Day
- 19 June – Juneteenth
- 4 July - Independence Day
- 21 July - Liberation Day
- 1 September - Labor Day
- 2 November – All Souls' Day
- 11 November - Veterans Day
- 27 November - Thanksgiving
- 8 December – Lady of Camarin Day
- 25 December - Christmas Day

== Events ==
- May 25 – Governor Guerrero visits Taiwan for the first time since taking office. She meets President Lai Ching-te and Foreign Minister Lin Chia-lung before returning on May 31.
- June 21 – U.S. officials tell Reuters they plan to move B-2 bombers to Guam amid tensions in the Middle East.
- October 1 – Digital activist Julian Aguon is awarded the Right Livelihood Award for his efforts to promote climate justice.

== Deaths ==
- 10 February: Ted S. Nelson, 89, politician, member of the Legislature (1983–1991, 1993–1997).
