= 2020 in Guam =

- Decades: 2000s; 2010s; 2020s
- See also: History of Guam; Historical outline of Guam; List of years in Guam; 2020 in the United States

Events from 2020 in Guam.

== Incumbents ==
- Governor: Lou Leon Guerrero
- Lieutenant Governor: Josh Tenorio

== Events ==
Ongoing – COVID-19 pandemic in Guam

- February 7 – The Government denied the entry request by the cruise ship MS Westerdam, which had potentially infected passengers.
