= 2023 in Guam =

- Decades: 2000s; 2010s; 2020s
- See also: History of Guam; Historical outline of Guam; List of years in Guam; 2023 in the United States

Events in the year 2023 in Guam.

== Incumbents ==
- Governor: Lou Leon Guerrero
- Lieutenant Governor: Josh Tenorio

== Events ==
Ongoing – COVID-19 pandemic in Guam

- 23 May – Typhoon Mawar officially strengthens into a category 4 super typhoon as it approaches Guam.
- 24 May – People in Guam and the Northern Mariana Islands are told to seek refuge as Typhoon Mawar approaches with winds reaching 282 km/h.

== Deaths ==
- 30 January – Pedo Terlaje, 76, politician, member of the Legislature of Guam (since 2019).

== See also ==
- History of Guam
