= 2022 in Guam =

- Decades: 2000s; 2010s; 2020s
- See also: History of Guam; Historical outline of Guam; List of years in Guam; 2022 in the United States

Events in the year 2022 in Guam.

== Incumbents ==
- Governor: Lou Leon Guerrero
- Lieutenant Governor: Josh Tenorio

== Events ==
Ongoing – COVID-19 pandemic in Guam

- November 8 –
  - 2022 Guamanian legislative election
  - 2022 Guamanian gubernatorial election
- November 5 – 2022 United States House of Representatives election in Guam

== See also ==
- History of Guam
