= 2021 in Guam =

- Decades: 2000s; 2010s; 2020s
- See also: History of Guam; Historical outline of Guam; List of years in Guam; 2021 in the United States

Events in the year 2021 in Guam.

== Incumbents ==
- Governor: Lou Leon Guerrero
- Lieutenant Governor: Josh Tenorio

== Events ==
Ongoing – COVID-19 pandemic in Guam

=== May ===
- May 24 – In Guam v. United States, the U.S. Supreme Court rules that Guam can sue the federal government for damages resulting from a dumpsite operated by the United States Navy beginning in the 1940s.

== Deaths ==
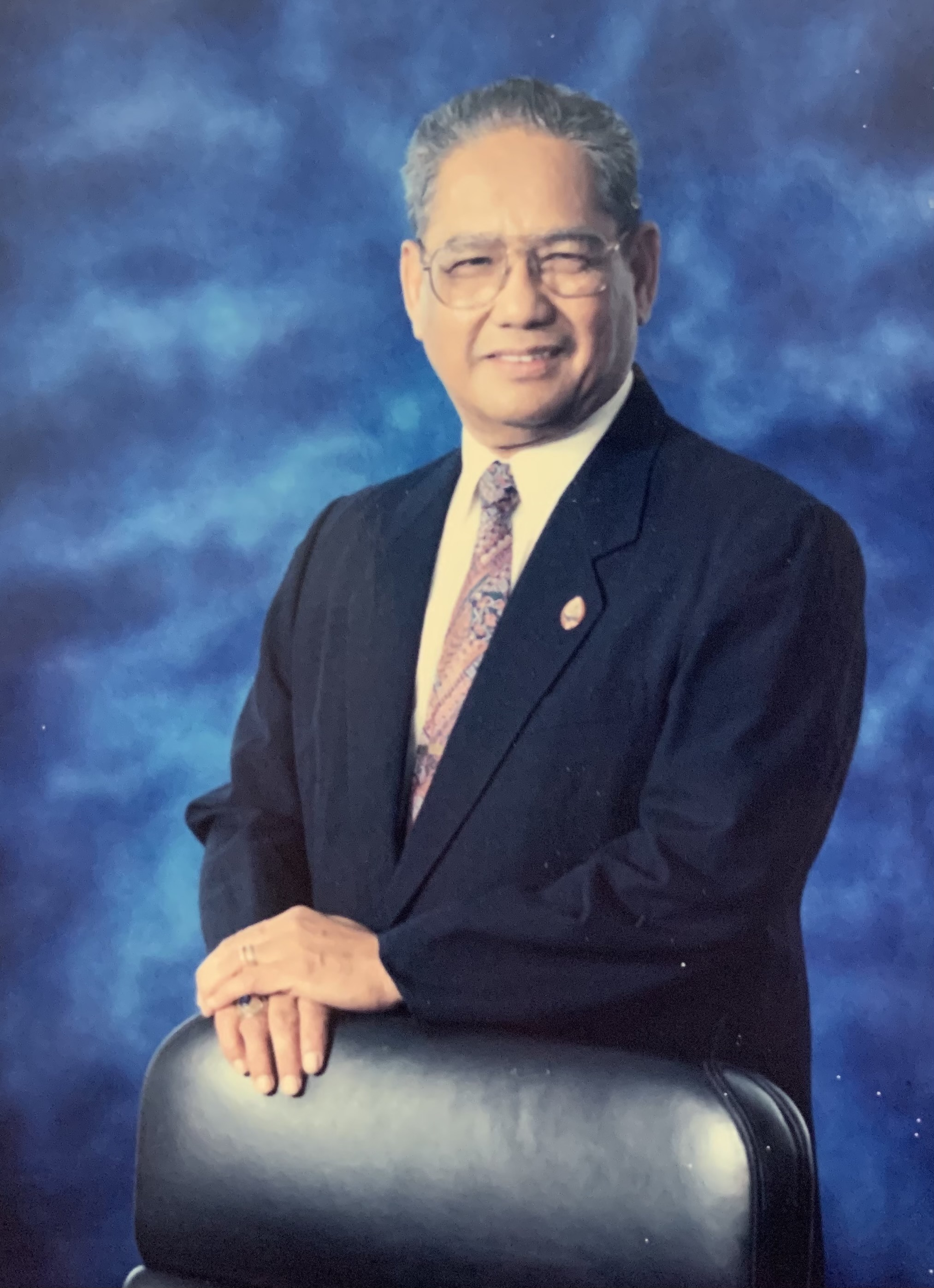
Joe T. San Agustin

- April 15 – Joe T. San Agustin, politician (born 1930).

== See also ==
- History of Guam
