= January 1982 Guamanian status referendum =

Guamanian ballot measure

A referendum on the territory's status was held in Guam on 30 January 1982. Although the option of becoming a U.S. commonwealth received the most votes, it did not achieve a majority. As a result, a second referendum was held in September with only two options.

== Results ==
Choice	Votes	%
U.S. commonwealth	4,914	49.49
U.S. state	2,547	25.65
Status quo	1,012	10.19
U.S. incorporated territory	536	5.40
Free association with the USA	393	3.96
Independence	379	3.82
Other	148	1.49
Total	9,929	100.00
Valid votes	9,929	99.15
Invalid/blank votes	85	0.85
Total votes	10,014	100.00
Registered voters/turnout	26,682	37.53
Source: Direct Democracy
