= Dulce Nombre de Maria Cathedral Basilica =

Dulce Nombre de Maria Cathedral Basilica Catedral Basílica del Dulce Nombre de María (Spanish)
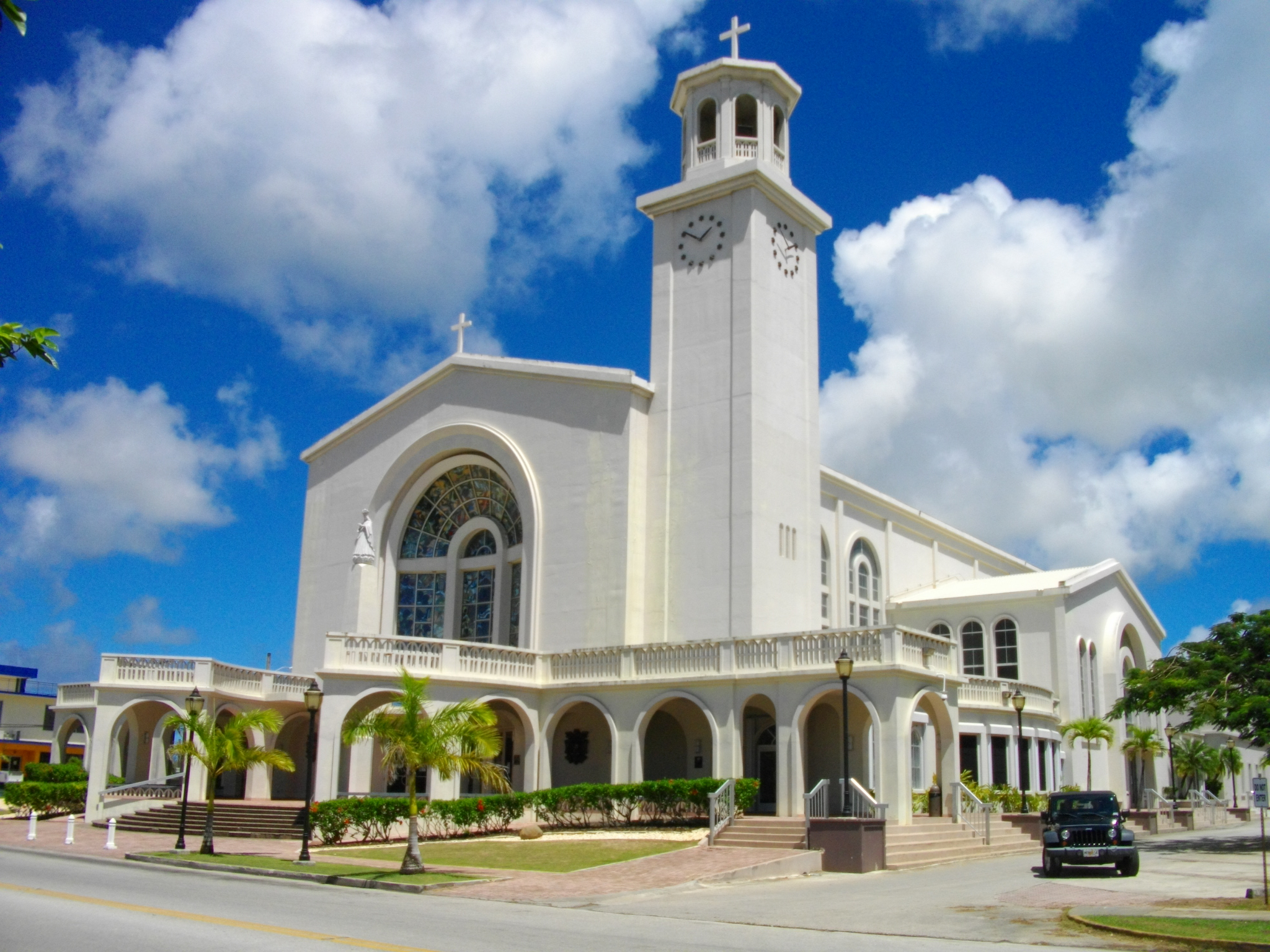
- Dulce Nombre de Maria Cathedral Basilica; Catedral Basílica del Dulce Nombre de María (Spanish)
- 13.4743°N 144.7524°E
- Location: Hagåtña
- Country: Guam
- Denomination: Roman Catholic

History
- Status: Cathedral
- Consecrated: 1959

Administration
- Diocese: Archdiocese of Agaña

Clergy
- Archbishop: Most Rev. Ryan Pagente Jimenez

Dulce Nombre de Maria Cathedral Basilica (Spanish: Catedral Basílica del Dulce Nombre de María) is a Roman Catholic cathedral in Guam. It is the seat of the archbishop of the Roman Catholic Archdiocese of Agaña. It is located on the site where the island's first Catholic church was constructed in 1669, under the guidance of Father Diego San Vitores. The present building rises above the palm trees and is a familiar landmark in downtown Hagåtña. The basilica enshrines the image of Santa Marian Kamalen, Patroness of Guam.

== History ==
The precursor of the current basilica was a capilla (chapel) of rough logs and nipa thatch built within the perimeter of the Plaza de España. The church was the focal point for administrative buildings were built. Built under the direction of Padre Diego Luis de San Vitores, with the assistance of the Chamorros of Hagåtña, it was dedicated on February 2, 1669.

Queen María Ana donated 300 pesos, and Chief Quipuha of Hagåtña contributed the land. In 1670, a more permanent structure was erected. Built of coral stones with the technique of mampostería, this structural foundation expanded to become the cathedral. Within this structure were walls, ceilings and floors constructed of ifit wood. A fresco on the rear wall depicted the Assumption of the Blessed Virgin Mary. This building stood for centuries until its destruction by bombardment during the 1944 Second Battle of Guam.

According to historian Benigno Palomo, in 1669 one of the main missions of the Spanish soldiers and missionaries was to exalt "the Catholic faith" and that "the people living in islands and land of this sort, you will and ought to bring to the Christian religion", from the Bill of Partition issued by Pope Alexander VI.

Other churches were built at Fu’una near Humåtak, at Tepungan by Asan, at Ritidian, at Tarrague, at Dededo and at Orote. Initially, many of these churches were ruined by native Chamorros in efforts to regain independence, while were destroyed by natural causes. Chamorros gradually accepted the Catholic faith of the Spanish as their own.

Before the World War II, there were nine churches and 22 chapels throughout Guam. These chapels were little sanctuaries between villages where one could privately pray during long journeys to and from home. All were destroyed in the liberation of Guam except those dedicated to San Dionisio in Humåtak, San José in Inalåhan and San Francisco at Yoʼña.

The present cathedral-basilica was dedicated on April 20, 1959, and celebrated its golden jubilee in 2009. The cathedral-basilica serves as a local landmark and is home to a community of parishioners who regularly attend Sunday Masses, sacred liturgies and annual events. It is also a place where Guam's visitors embrace the island's rich Catholic history and identity.

The National Museum of the Dulce Nombre de María is located above the Chapel of Saint Thérèse of Lisieux. The museum features changing displays of inspirational art created by local artists.
