= September 1982 Guamanian status referendum =

4 September 1982

Results
Choice	Votes	%
US commonwealth	17,348	72.82%
US statehood	6,476	27.18%
Valid votes	23,824	91.32%
Invalid or blank votes	2,265	8.68%
Total votes	26,089	100.00%
Registered voters/turnout	32,055	81.39%

A referendum on the territory's status was held in Guam on 4 September 1982. It was held after a referendum in January had resulted in none of the options presented to voters receiving a majority in favour. This time only two options, becoming a US commonwealth or a US state, were offered to voters, with 73% voting in favour of the former. However, the territory has still not achieved commonwealth status.

== Results ==
Choice	Votes	%
US commonwealth	17,348	72.82
US state	6,476	27.18
Total	23,824	100.00
Valid votes	23,824	91.32
Invalid/blank votes	2,265	8.68
Total votes	26,089	100.00
Registered voters/turnout	32,055	81.39
Source: Direct Democracy
