= Santa Marian Kamalen =

Guamanian image of the Virgin Mary, representing the Immaculate Conception

Our Lady of Camarin Santa Marian Kamalen, Maga Haga
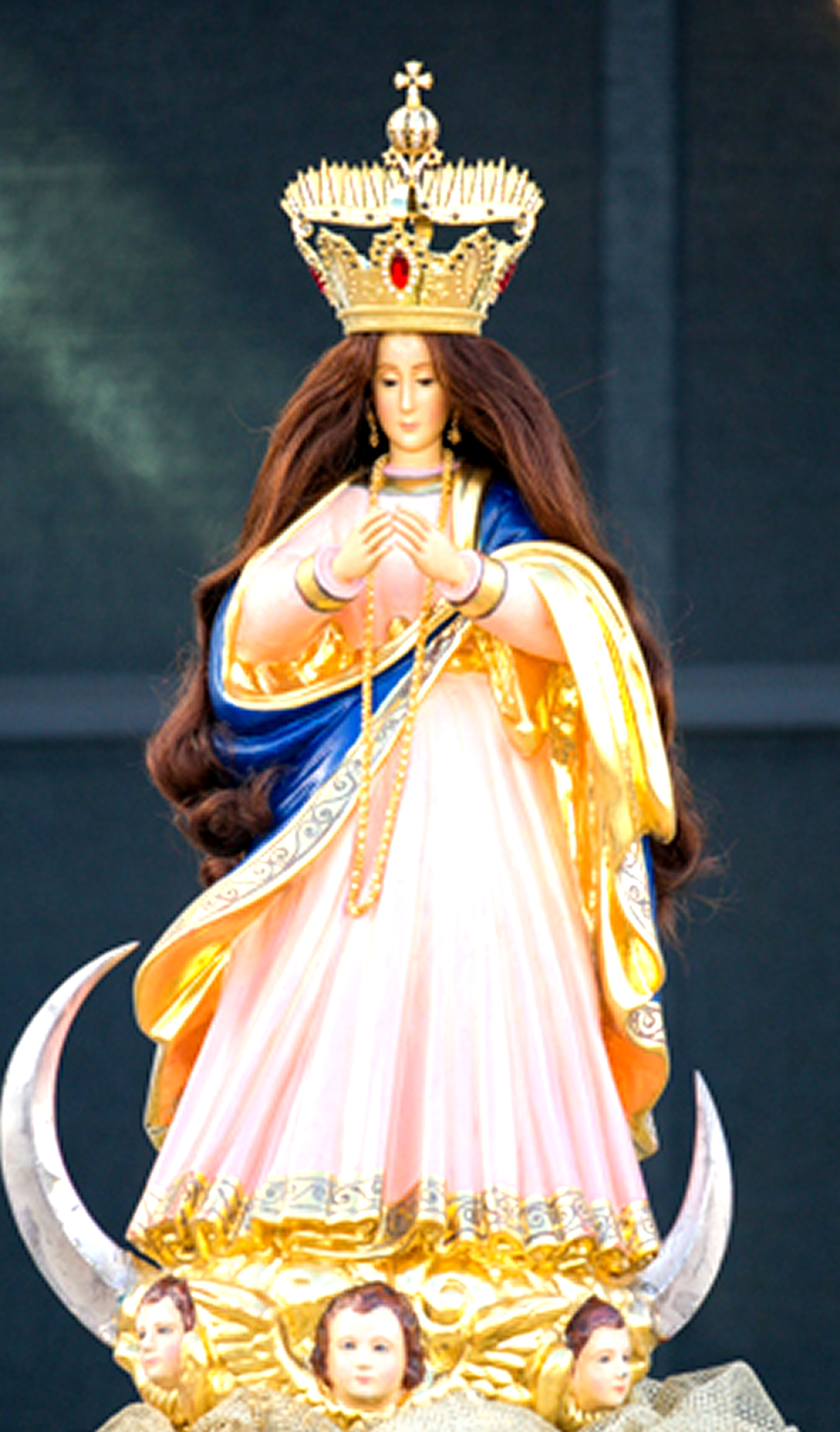
- The venerated image enshrined at the Minor Basilica of Most Sweet Name of Mary

Queen and Patroness of Guam
- Venerated in: Roman Catholic Church
- Major shrine: Cathedral-Basilica of the Most Sweet Name of Mary
- Feast: December 8, Feast of the Immaculate Conception
- Attributes: The Blessed Virgin Mary on crescent moon
- Patronage: Guam and Guamanian people, Mariana Islands

Santa Marian Kamalen also known as Our Lady of Camarin and informally known as Dulce Nombre (English: Sweet Name) is a title of the Blessed Virgin Mary associated with a carved molave wood and ivory image venerated by the Roman Catholic faithful in Guam as their Patroness. Santa Marian Kamalen is the patron saint of Guam, and the Mariana Islands.

The image is known to have escaped the Japanese war and bombing of Guam on 8 December 1941, the Feast of the Immaculate Conception. It is permanently enshrined at the Minor Basilica of the Most Sweet Name of Mary.

== History ==
Although its origins are unknown, pious legends claim that the image was brought by Spaniards through the Galleon ship Nuestra Señora del Pilar de Zaragoza y Santiago which was shipwrecked on 2 June 1690 at the Cocos Island of Guam. The image is thought to have been enshrined on the ship by its sailors.

One account of its discovery holds that a fisherman found the statue along the shore of Merizo. He saw the image accompanied by two crabs with votive candles, later interpreted as miraculous by indigenous people in the area. The image later gained the title of Kamalen, literally Barracks due to the image being stored in a nearby infantry compound after it was found by the fisherman.

Popular legends also recount the image surviving the 1902 earthquake in Guam, which destroyed the shrine and many statues within the church but left the image intact.

The image measures approximately 28 inches and weighs 48 pounds. The image is composed of polychromed Molave wood and ivory head and hands. Caretakers of the image rescued the statue on 8 December 1941 at the beginning of the Second World War, when the image was hidden for safekeeping. The image was enshrined at the cathedral again on 8 December 1945, on the Feast of the Immaculate Conception.

In 1948, the image was brought to the Philippines for professional restoration by renowned Filipino Santero artist Máximo Vicente, who also restored the Black Nazarene of Quiapo.

== Veneration ==
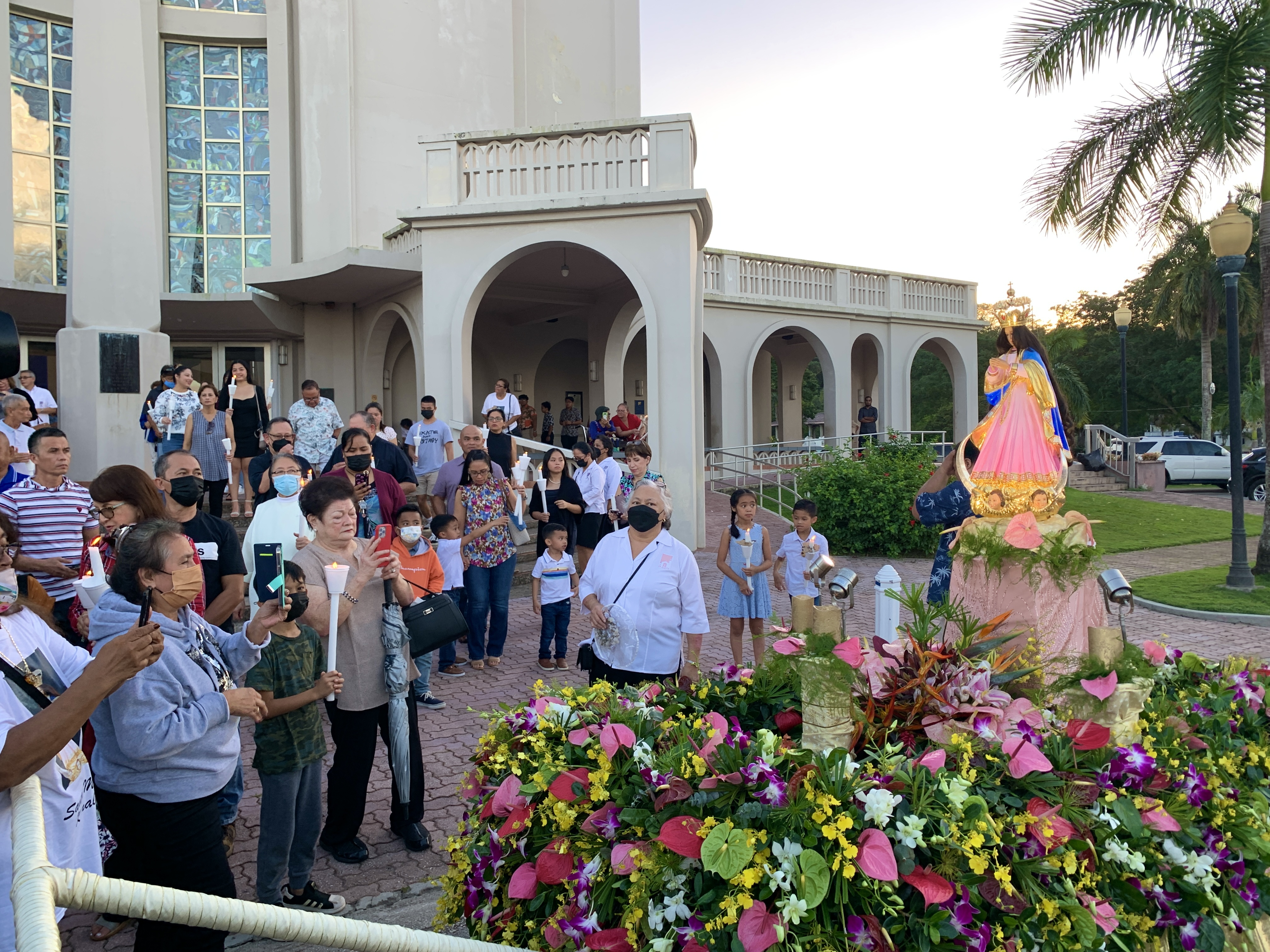
Statue of Santa Marian Kamalen on Santa Marian Kamalen Day at Dulce Nombre de Maria Cathedral Basilica, December 8, 2022

The image was stolen on three occasions: 19 May 1968, 3 May 1971 and 28 December 1992; yet later returned. A replica is enshrined for public veneration at the main church, while the original ivory statue is enshrined above the high altar. A digital alarm is installed on its pedestal which is accompanied by the main caretaker of the image. Behind its niche are three panels of locked doors, accessible only by a staircase through the old rectory entrance.

Every year on December 8, Our Lady of Camarin is honored with a procession in which a statue of the patroness is pulled on a cart amid the prayers of thousands of the island's Catholics.

Pope John Paul II mentioned the image on 22 February 1981 during his Apostolic visit. A replica image was installed at the Basilica of the National Shrine of the Immaculate Conception in Washington, D.C., on 17 September 2006.
