= History of Guam =

The history of Guam starts with the early arrival around 2000 BC of Austronesian people known today as the Chamorro Peoples. The Chamorus then developed a "pre-contact" society, that was colonized by the Spanish in the 17th century. The present American rule of the island began with the 1898 Spanish–American War. Guam's history of colonialism is the longest among the Pacific islands.

== Guam prior to European contact ==
=== Migrations ===
Map showing the Neolithic Austronesian migrations into the islands of the Indo-Pacific

The Mariana Islands were the first islands settled by humans in Remote Oceania. Incidentally it is also the first and the longest of the ocean-crossing voyages of the Austronesian peoples into Remote Oceania, and is separate from the later Polynesian settlement of the rest of Remote Oceania. They were first settled around 1500 to 1400 BC by migrants departing from the Philippines.

Archeological studies of human activity on the islands has revealed potteries with red-slipped, circle-stamped and punctate-stamped designs found in the Mariana Islands dating between 1500 and 1400 BC. These artifacts show similar aesthetics to pottery found in Northern and Central Philippines, the Nagsabaran (Cagayan Valley) pottery, which flourished during the period between 2000 and 1300 BC.

Comparative and historical linguistics also indicate that the Chamoru language is most closely related to the Indonesian Malayan subfamily of the Austronesian languages, instead of the Oceanic subfamily of the languages of the rest of Remote Oceania.

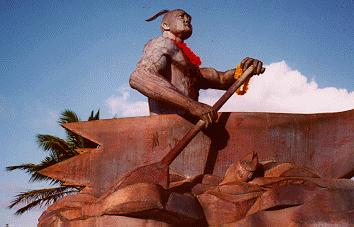
Chief Gadao is featured in many legends about Guam before European colonization.

Mitchondrial DNA and whole genome sequencing of the Chamoru people strongly support Philippine ancestry. Genetic analysis of pre-Latte period skeletons in Guam also show that they do not have Melanesian ancestry which rules out origins from the Bismarck Archipelago, New Guinea, or eastern Indonesia. The Lapita culture itself (the ancestral branch of the Polynesian migrations) is younger than the first settlement of the Marianas (the earliest Lapita artifacts are dated to around 1350 to 1300 BCE), indicating that they originated from separate migration voyages.

Nevertheless, DNA analysis also shows a close genetic relationship between ancient settlers of the Marianas and early Lapita settlers in the Bismarck Archipelago. This may indicate that both the Lapita culture and the Marianas were settled by direct migrations from the Philippines, or that early settlers from the Marianas voyaged further southwards into the Bismarcks and reconnected with the Lapita people.

The Marianas also later established contact and received migrations from the Caroline Islands at around the first millennium CE. This brought new pottery styles, language, genes, and the hybrid Polynesian breadfruit.

The period 900 to 1700 CE of the Marianas, immediately before and during the Spanish colonization, is known as the Latte period. It is characterized by rapid cultural change, most notably by the massive megalithic latte stones (also spelled latde or latti). These were composed of the haligi pillars capped with another stone called tasa (which prevented rodents from climbing the posts). These served as supports for the rest of the structure which was made of wood. Remains of structures made with similar wooden posts have also been found. Human graves have also been found in front of latte structures. The Latte period was also characterized by the introduction of rice agriculture, which is unique in the pre-contact Pacific Islands.

The reasons for these changes are still unclear, but it is believed that it may have resulted from a third wave of migrants from maritime Southeast Asia. Comparisons with other architectural traditions makes it likely that this third migration wave were again from the Philippines, or from eastern Indonesia (either Sulawesi or Sumba), all of which have a tradition of raised buildings with capstones. Interestingly, the word haligi ("pillar") is also used in various languages throughout the Philippines; while the Chamoru word guma ("house") closely resembles the Sumba word uma.

=== Ancient Chamoru society ===
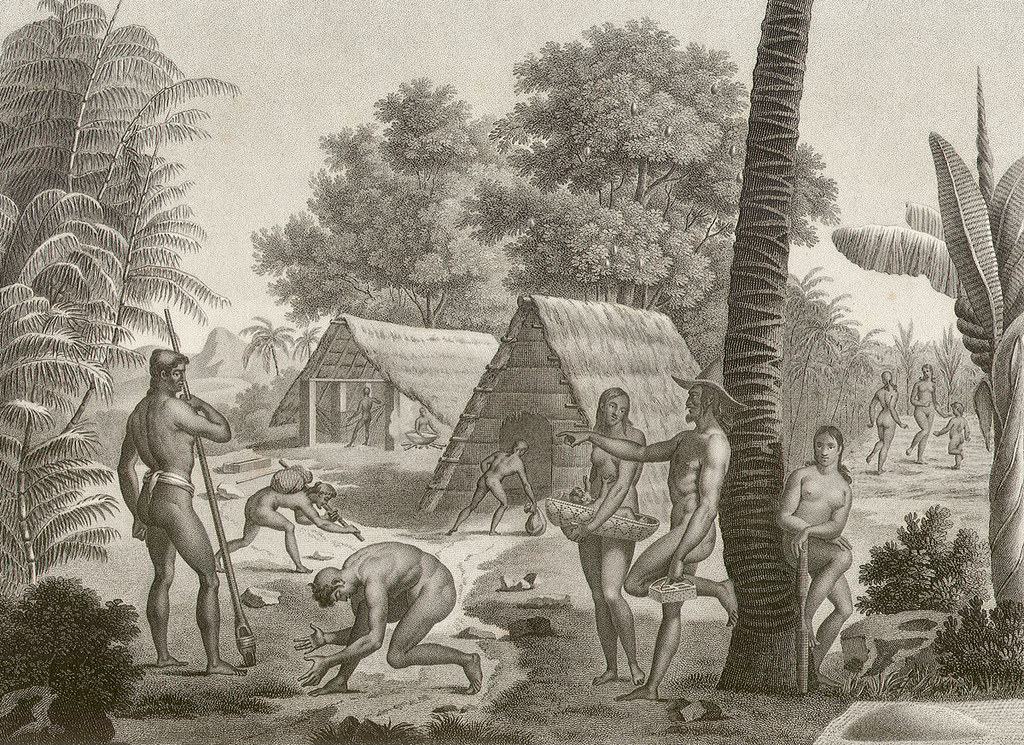
1819 illustration depicting the three Chamoru castes

Most of what is known about Pre-Contact ("Ancient") Chamorus comes from legends and myths, archaeological evidence, Jesuit missionary accounts, and observations from visiting scientists like Otto von Kotzebue and Louis de Freycinet.

When Europeans first arrived on Guam, Chamoru society roughly fell into three classes: matao (upper class), achaot (middle class), and mana'chang (lower class). The matao lived in the coastal villages, which meant they had the best access to fishing grounds while the mana'chang lived in the interior of the island. Matao and mana'chang rarely communicated with each other, and matao often used achaot as a go-between.

There were also "makhanas" (shamans) and "suruhanus" (herb doctors), skilled in healing and medicine. Belief in spirits of ancient Chamorros called Taotao Mona still persists as remnant of pre-European society. Early European explorers noted the sakman, the Chamoru fast sailing vessel used for trading with other islands of Micronesia.

=== Latte ===
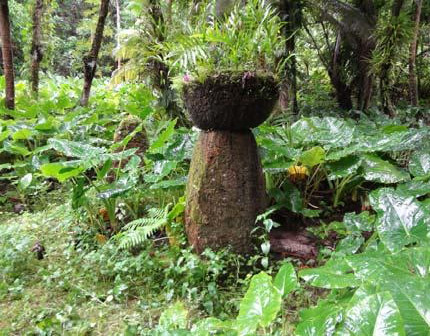
Latte stone from a northern beach

The latte stones were not a recent development in Contact Chamoru society. The latte stone consists of a head and a base shaped out of limestone. Like the Easter Island Moai statues, there is plenty of speculation over how this was done by a society without machines or metal, but the generally accepted view is that the head and base were etched out of the ground by sharp adzes and picks (possibly with the use of fire), and carried to the assembly area by an elaborate system of ropes and logs. The latte stone was used as a part of the raised foundation for a magalahi (matao chief) house, although they may have also been used for canoe sheds.

Archaeologists using carbon-dating have broken Pre-Contact Guam (i.e. Chamoru) history into three periods: "Pre-Latte" (BC 2000? to AD 1) "Transitional Pre-Latte" (AD 1 to AD 1000), and "Latte" (AD 1000 to AD 1521). Archaeological evidence also suggests that Chamoru society was on the verge of another transition phase by 1521, as latte stones became bigger.

Assuming the stones were used for chiefly houses, it can be argued that Chamoru society was becoming more stratified, either from population growth or the arrival of new people. The theory remains tenuous, however, due to lack of evidence, but if proven correct, will further support the idea that Pre-Contact Chamorus lived in a vibrant and dynamic environment.

== Spanish era ==
=== Magellan's first encounter with Guam ===
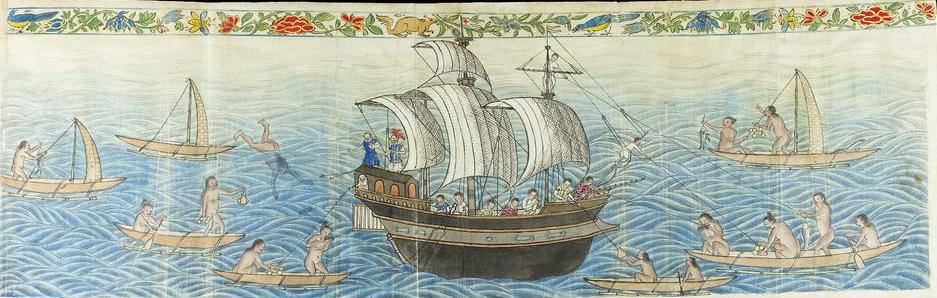
Reception of the Manila Galleon by the Chamoru in the Ladrones Islands, ca. 1590 Boxer Codex

The first known contact between Guam and Europeans occurred with the arrival of a Spanish expedition led by Ferdinand Magellan. His three-ship fleet arrived on March 6, 1521, after a long voyage across the Atlantic and Pacific Oceans, from Spain. History credits the village of Umatac as his landing place, but drawings from the navigator's diary suggest that Magellan may have landed in Tumon in northern Guam. The expedition had started out in Spain with five ships. By the time they reached the Marianas, they were down to three ships and barely half the crew, due to storms, disease, and mutiny in one ship.

When Magellan's fleet arrived at Guam, they were greeted by hundreds of small outrigger canoes that appeared to be flying over the water due to their considerable speed. These outrigger canoes were called proas and resulted in Magellan naming Guam Islas de las Velas Latinas ("Islands of the Lateen sails"). Antonio Pigafetta (one of 18 crewmen who completed the voyage) wrote in his account that the name was "Island of Sails".

Tired and hungry from their long voyage, the crew prepared to go ashore and get food and water. However, the Chamorus had a different concept of ownership, based on subsistence living, and were very excited by the appearance of these strange vessels. The Chamorus canoed out to the ships and began helping themselves to everything that was not nailed down to the deck of the galleons. "The aboriginals were willing to engage in barter... Their love of gain overcame every other consideration."

Pigafetta wrote that the inhabitants "entered the ships and stole whatever they could lay their hands on," including "the small boat that was fastened to the poop of the flagship." "Those people are poor, but ingenious and very thievish, on account of which we called those three islands Islas de los Ladrones ("Islands of thieves")."

After a few shots were fired from the Trinidad's big guns, the natives were frightened off from the ship and retreated into the surrounding jungle. Magellan was eventually able to obtain rations and offered iron, a highly prized material, in exchange for fresh fruits, vegetables, and water. Details of this visit, the first in history between the Spanish and a Pacific island people, come from Pigafetta's journal.

=== Spanish colonization ===
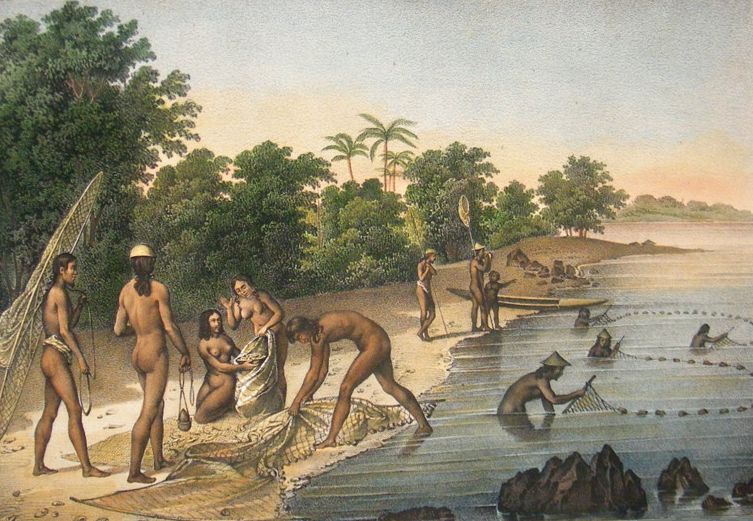
1845 depiction of a group of Chamorus fishing for a village

Despite Magellan's visit, Guam was not officially claimed by Spain until 1565 by Miguel Lopez de Legazpi. However, the island was not actually colonized until the 17th century.

On June 15, 1668, the galleon San Diego arrived at the island of Guam. Jesuit missionaries led by Diego Luis de San Vitores arrived on Guam to introduce Christianity and develop trade. The Spanish taught the Chamorus to cultivate maize (corn), raise cattle, and tan hides, as well as to adopt western-style clothing. They also introduced the Spanish language and culture. Once Christianity was established, the Catholic Church became the focal point for village activities, as in other Spanish cities. Since 1565, Guam had been a regular port-of-call for the Spanish galleons that crossed the Pacific Ocean from Mexico to the Philippines.

Chief Quipuha was the maga'lahi, or high ranking male, in the area of Hagåtña when the Spanish landed there in 1668. Quipuha welcomed the missionaries and consented to be baptized by Fr. San Vitores as Juan Quipuha. Quipuha granted the lands on which the first Catholic Church in Guam was constructed in 1669. Chief Quipuha died in 1669 but his policy of allowing the Spanish to establish a base on Guam had important consequences for the future of the island. It also facilitated the Manila Galleon trade.

A few years later, Fr. San Vitores and his assistant, Pedro Calungsod, were killed by Chief Mata'pang of Tomhom (Tumon), allegedly for baptizing the Chief's baby girl without the Chief's consent. This was in April 1672. Many Chamorus at the time believed baptisms killed babies: because priests would baptize infants already near death (in the belief that this was the only way to save such children's souls), baptism seemed to many Chamorus to be the cause of death. The death of Quipuha, and the murder of San Vitores and Calungsod, led to a number of conflicts. Captain Juan de Santiago started a campaign to conquer the island, which was continued by the successive commanders of the Spanish forces. The Spanish-Chamorro Wars on Guam began in 1670 over growing tensions with the Jesuit mission, with the last large-scale uprising in 1683. After his arrival in 1674, Captain Damian de Esplana ordered the arrest of rebels who attacked the population of certain towns. Hostilities eventually led to the destruction of villages such as Chochogo, Pepura, Tumon, Sidia-Aty, Sagua, Nagan, and Ninca. Starting in June 1676, the first Spanish Governor of Guam, Capt. Francisco de Irrisarri y Vinar, controlled internal affairs more strictly than his predecessors in order to curb tensions. He also ordered the construction of schools, roads, and other infrastructure. In 1680, Captain Jose de Quiroga arrived and continued some of the development projects started by his predecessors. He also continued the search for the rebels who had killed Father San Vitores, resulting in campaigns against the rebels which were hiding out in some islands, eventually leading to the deaths. of Matapang, Hurao, and Aguarin. Quiroga brought some natives from the northern islands to Guam, ordering the population to live in a few large villages. These included Jinapsan, Umatac, Pago, Agat, and Inarajan, where he built a number of churches. By July 1695, Quiroga had completed the conquest of Guam, Rota, Tinian, and Aguigan. Intermittent warfare, plus the typhoons of 1671 and 1693, and in particular the smallpox epidemic of 1688, reduced the Chamorro population from 50,000 to 10,000, finally to less than 5,000.

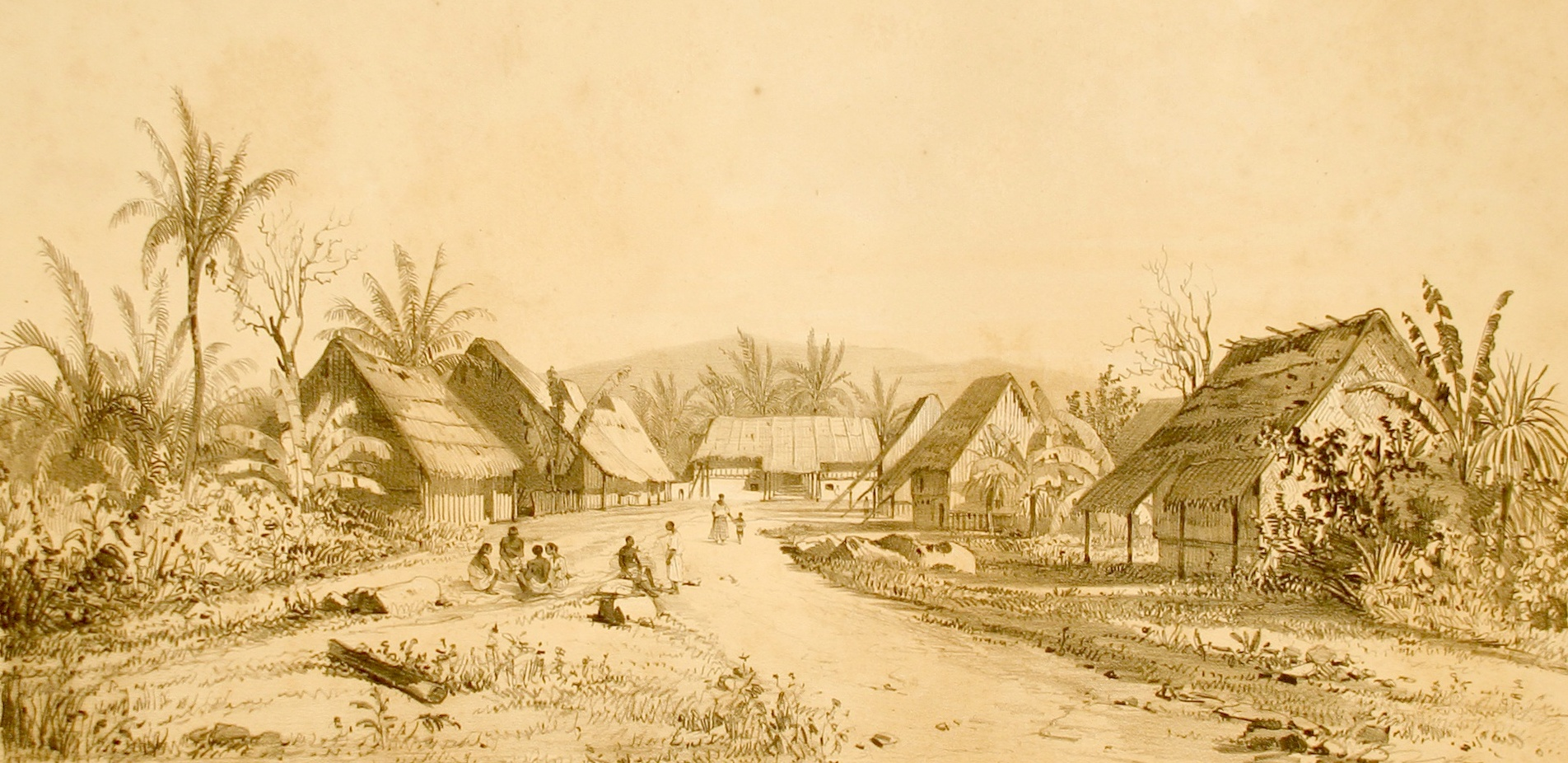
Umatac in 1846

During the course of the Spanish administration of Guam, lower birth rates and diseases reduced the population from 12,000 to roughly 5,000 by 1741. After 1695, Chamorus settled in five villages: Hagåtña, Agat, Umatac, Pago, and Fena. During this historical period, Spanish language and customs were introduced in the island and Catholicism became the predominant religion. The Spanish built infrastructures such as roads and ports, as well as schools and hospitals. Spanish and Filipinos, mostly men, increasingly intermarried with the Chamorus, particularly the new cultured or "high" people (manak'kilo) or gentry of the towns. In 1740, Chamorus of the Northern Mariana Islands, except Rota, were moved from some of their home islands to Guam.

=== Expulsion of the Jesuits ===
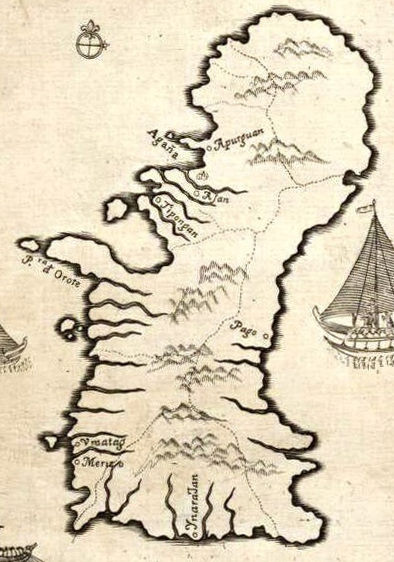
The island of Guajan (Guam), detail from Carta Hydrographica y Chorographica de las Islas Filipinas (1734)

On February 26, 1767, Charles III of Spain issued a decree confiscating the property of the Jesuits and banishing them from Spain and her possessions. As a consequence, the Jesuit fathers on Guam departed on November 2, 1769, on the schooner Nuestra Señora de Guadalupe, abandoning their churches, rectories and ranches.

Governor Don Mariano Tobias, who arrived of on September 15, 1771, brought agricultural and civil reforms. These included making land available to the islanders for cultivation; encouraging the development of cattle raising; importing deer and water buffalo from Manila, and donkeys and mules from Acapulco; establishing cotton mills and salt pans; establishing free public schools; and forming the first Guam militia. He was transferred to Manila in June 1774.

Spain built several defensive fortifications to protect their Pacific fleet, such as Fort Nuestra Señora de la Soledad in Umatac. The Galleon Era ended in 1815 following Mexican Independence. Guam later was host to a number of scientists, voyagers, and whalers from Russia, France, and England who also provided detailed accounts of daily life on Guam under Spanish rule. Through the Spanish colonial period, Guam inherited food, language, and surnames from Spain and Spanish America. Other reminders of colonial times include the old Governor's Palace in Plaza de España and the Spanish Bridge, both in Hagåtña. Guam's Dulce Nombre de Maria Cathedral Basilica was formally opened on February 2, 1669, as was the Royal College of San Juan de Letran. The cultures of both Guam and the Northern Marianas gained many similarities with Spanish culture due to three centuries of Spanish rule.

=== Post-Napoleonic era ===
Following the Napoleonic Wars, many Spanish colonies in the Western Hemisphere had become independent, shifting the economic dependence of Guam from Mexico to the Philippines. Don Francisco Ramon de Villalobos, who became governor in 1831, improved economic conditions including the promotion of rice cultivation and the establishment of a leper hospital.

Otto von Kotzebue visited the island in November 1817, and Louis de Freycinet in March 1819. Jules Dumont d'Urville made two visits, the first in May 1828. The island became a rest stop for whalers starting in 1823.

A devastating typhoon struck the island on August 10, 1848, followed by a severe earthquake on January 25, 1849, which resulted in many refugees from the Caroline Islands, victims of the resultant tsunami. After a smallpox epidemic killed 3,644 Guamanians in 1856, Carolinians and Japanese were permitted to settle in the Marianas. Guam received nineteen Filipino prisoners after their failed 1872 Cavite mutiny. Later in 1896, more than fifty Filipino "deportados" were sent to Guam; when they attempted to escape many were killed and wounded by Chamorro artillerymen.

== American era ==
=== Capture of Guam ===
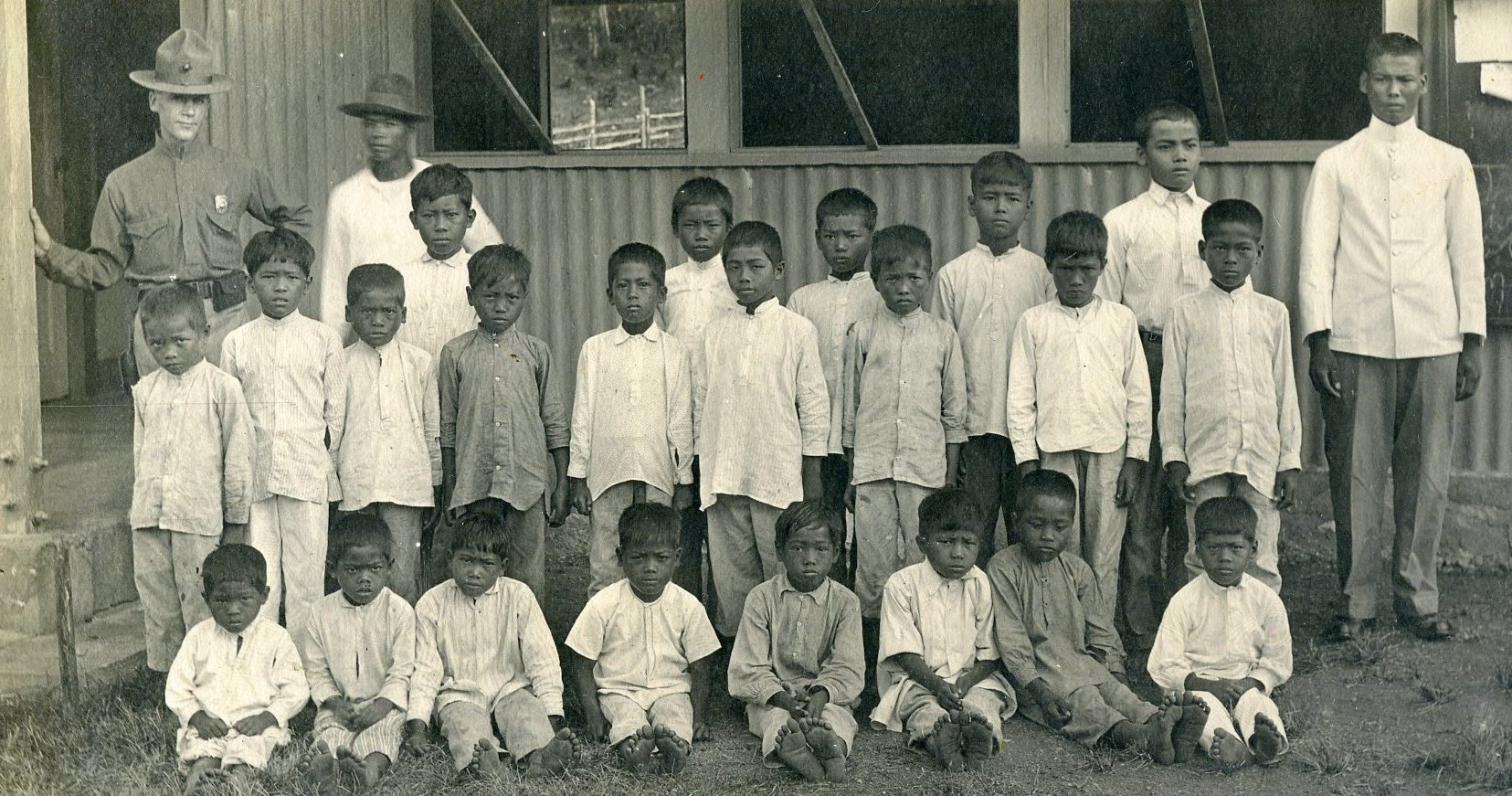
School and U.S. Marine patrolman, 1914

On June 21, 1898, the United States captured Guam in a bloodless landing during the Spanish–American War. By the Treaty of Paris, Spain officially ceded the island to the United States. Between the American capture of Guam, and installation of a Naval Governor in August 1899, there was a flux in governance of the island. Guam became part of an American telegraph line to the Philippines, also ceded by the treaty; a way station for American ships traveling to and from there; and an important part of the United States' War Plan Orange against Japan. Although Alfred Thayer Mahan, Robert Coontz, and others envisioned the island as "a kind of Gibraltar" in the Pacific, Congress repeatedly failed to fulfill the military's requests to fortify Guam; when the German warship SMS Cormoran was interned in 1914 before America's entry into World War I, its crew of 543 outnumbered their American custodians.

Guam came to serve as a station for American merchant and warships traveling to and from the Philippines (another American acquisition from Spain) while the Northern Mariana Islands were sold by Spain to Germany for part of its rapidly expanding German Empire. A U.S. Navy yard was established at Piti in 1899, and a United States Marine Corps barracks at Sumay in 1901.

During the Philippine–American War of 1899–1902, Apolinario Mabini was exiled to Guam in 1901 after his capture. Mabini was one of 43 prisoners, accompanied by 15 servants, who were exiled to Guam. They were imprisoned on the site of a former leper hospital in Asan. The prison was commanded by an officer of the United States Army; under the army officer the guards of the facility were provided by the United States Marine Corps. (Note: During this period there was unrest caused by Marines who were assigned to guard duty at the facility. This unrest included theft, and assault.) The facility was named the Presidio of Asan. Marines assigned to the facility would rotate from Cavite every six months. One of those exiled and imprisoned at the facility would be one of the first two Resident Commissioner of the Philippines Pablo Ocampo. The facility closed in 1903.

Following the German defeat in World War I, the Northern Mariana Islands became part of the South Seas Mandate, a League of Nations Mandate in 1919 with the nearby Empire of Japan as the mandatory ("trustee") as a member nation of the victorious Allies in the "Great War". The 1910 Catholic Encyclopedia said of Guam, "of its total population of 11,490 (11,159 natives), Hagåtña, the capital, contains about 8,000. Possessing a good harbor, the island serves as a United States naval station, the naval commandant acting also as governor. The products of the island are maize, copra, rice, sugar, and valuable timber." Military officers governed the island as "USS Guam", and the United States Navy opposed proposals for civilian government until 1950.

=== World War II ===
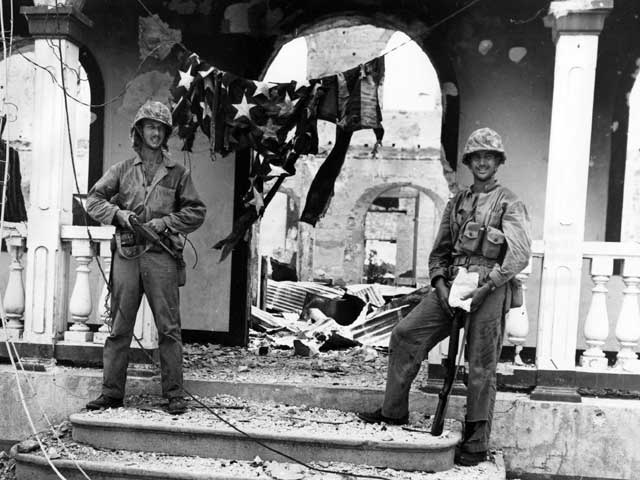
Marines before the ruins of the church in Hagåtña during the liberation of Guam in 1944.

During World War II, Guam was attacked and invaded by Japan on Monday, December 8, 1941, at the same time as the attack on Pearl Harbor, across the International Date Line. In addition, Japan made major military moves into Southeast Asia and the East Indies islands of the South Pacific Ocean against the British and Dutch colonies, opening a new wider Pacific phase in the Second World War. The Japanese renamed Guam Ōmiya-jima (Great Shrine Island).

The Northern Mariana Islands had become a League of Nations mandate assigned to Japan in 1919, pursuant to the Treaty of Versailles of 1919. Indigenous Chamorro people from the Northern Marianas were brought to Guam to serve as interpreters and in other capacities for the occupying Japanese force. The Guamanian Chamorros were treated as an occupied enemy by the Japanese military. After the war, this would cause resentment between the Guamanian Chamorros and the Chamorros of the Northern Marianas. Guam's Chamorros believed their northern brethren should have been compassionate towards them, whereas having been administered by Japan for over 30 years, the Northern Mariana Chamorros were loyal to the Japanese government.

The Japanese occupation of Guam lasted for approximately 31 months, from 1941 to 1944. During this period, the indigenous people of Guam were subjected to forced labor, family separation, incarceration, execution, concentration camps and forced prostitution. Approximately 1,000 people died during the occupation, according to later Congressional committee testimony in 2004. Some historians estimate that war violence killed 10% of Guam's then 20,000 population. It was a coercive experience for the Chamoru people, whose loyalty to the United States became a point of contention with the Japanese. Several American servicemen remained on the island, however, and were hidden by the Chamoru people. All of these servicemen were found and executed by Japanese forces in 1942; only one escaped.

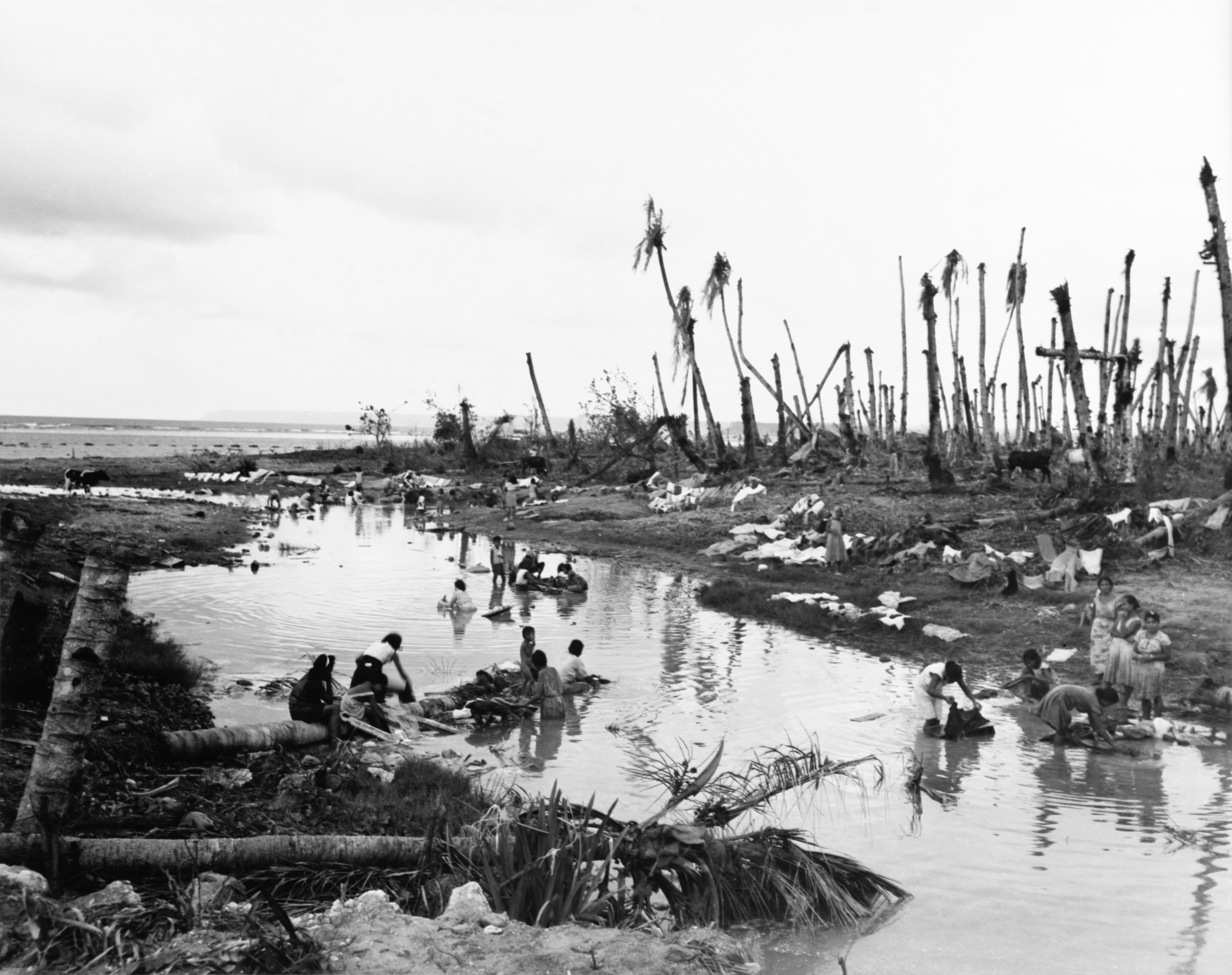
Women washing clothes in a river at Hagåtña next to trees destroyed by the bombardment, August 1944

The second Battle of Guam began on July 21, 1944, with American troops landing on western side of the island after several weeks of pre-invasion bombardment by the U.S. Navy. After several weeks of heavy fighting, Japanese forces officially surrendered on August 10, 1944. More than 18,000 Japanese were killed as only 485 surrendered. Sergeant Shoichi Yokoi, who surrendered in January 1972, appears to have been the last confirmed Japanese holdout, having held out for 28 years in the forested back country on Guam. The United States also captured and occupied the nearby Northern Marianas Islands.

Guam was subsequently converted into a forward operations base for the U.S. Navy and Air Force. Airfields were constructed in the northern part of the island (including Andersen Air Force Base), the island's pre-WWII Naval Station was expanded, and numerous facilities and supply depots were constructed throughout the island. North Field was established in 1944, and was renamed for Brigadier General James Roy Andersen of the old U.S. Army Air Forces as Andersen Air Force Base.

Guam's two largest pre-war communities (Sumay and Hagåtña) were virtually destroyed during the 1944 battle. Many Chamoru families lived in temporary re-settlement camps near the beaches before moving to permanent homes constructed in the island's outer villages. Guam's southern villages largely escaped damage, however.

=== Self-determination ===
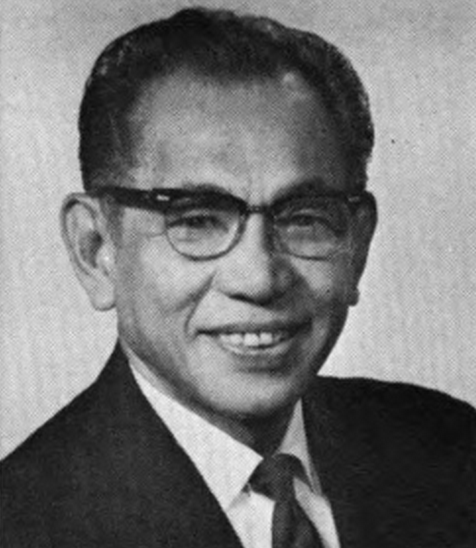
Prior to becoming the first Delegate from Guam to the United States House of Representatives in 1973, Antonio Borja Won Pat actively lobbied for Guam's self-representation

The immediate years after World War II saw the U.S. Navy attempting to resume its predominance in Guam affairs. This eventually led to resentment, and thus increased political pressure from Chamoru leaders for greater autonomy.

The result was the Guam Organic Act of 1950 which established Guam as an unincorporated organized territory of the United States and, for the first time in Guam history, provided for a civilian government. In 1951, Public Law 01-12 established the new government, including a judicial branch, and an executive branch with many departments. (Note: Created agencies included the Department of Medical Services, the Department of Public Works, the Department of Education, the Department of Public Safety, the Division of Civil Defense, the Department of Finance, the Office of the Commissioners of Guam, the Department of Attorney General, the Department of Agriculture, the Department of Labor and Personnel, the Governor's Office, the Office of Land Management, the Budget Office, the Department of Commerce, the Alcoholic Beverage Control Board, and the Office of Election Commissioner.)

The Immigration and Nationality Act of 1952, section 307, granted U.S. citizenship to "all persons born in the island of Guam on or after April 11, 1899. In the 1960s, the island's required security clearance for visitors was lifted.

On September 11, 1968, eighteen years after passage of the Organic Act, Congress passed the "Elective Governor Act" (Public Law 90-497), which allowed the people of Guam to elect their own governor and lieutenant governor. Nearly four years later, Congress passed the "Guam-Virgin Islands Delegate" Act that allowed for one Guam delegate in the U.S. House of Representatives. The delegate has a voice in debates and a vote in committees, but no vote on the floor of the House.

Andersen Air Force Base played a major role in the Vietnam War. The host unit was later designated the 36th Wing (36 WG), assigned to the Pacific Air Forces (PACAF) Thirteenth Air Force (13AF). In September 2012, 13 AF was deactivated and its functions merged into PACAF. The multinational Cope North military exercise is an annual event.

Although Public Law 94-584 established the formation of a "locally drafted" constitution (later known as the "Guam Constitution"), the proposed document was rejected by Guam residents in an August 4, 1979 referendum.

In the meantime, Guam's local government had formed several political status commissions to address possible options for self-determination. The following year after passage of the Guam Delegate Act saw the creation of the "Status Commission" by the Twelfth Guam Legislature.

This was followed by the establishment of the "Second Political Status Commission" in 1975 and the Guam "Commission on Self-Determination" (CSD) in 1980. The Twenty-Fourth Guam Legislature established the "Commission on Decolonization" in 1996 to enhance CSD's ongoing studies of various political status options and public education campaigns.

These efforts enabled the CSD, barely two years after its creation, to organize a status referendum on January 12, 1982. 49% of voters chose a closer relationship with the United States via Commonwealth.

Twenty-six percent voted for Statehood, while ten percent voted for the Status Quo (as an Unincorporated territory). A subsequent run-off referendum held between Commonwealth and Statehood saw 73% of Guam voters choosing Commonwealth over Statehood (27%). Today, Guam remains an unincorporated territory despite referendums and a United Nations mandate to establish a permanent status for the island.

=== Contemporary Guam ===
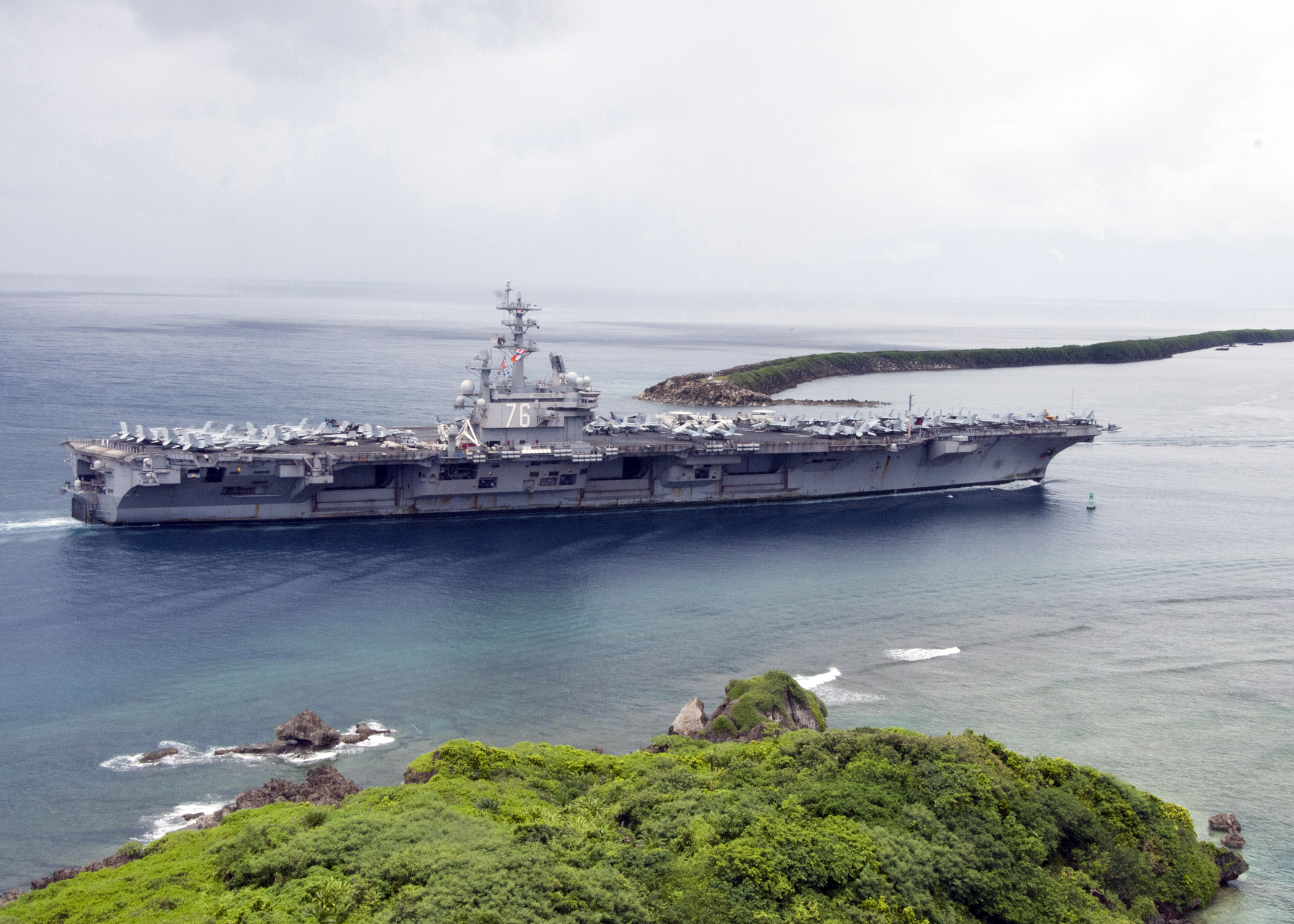
The aircraft carrier USS Ronald Reagan sailing into Apra Harbor, 2011

Guam's U.S. military installations remain among the most strategically vital in the Pacific Ocean. When the United States closed U.S. Naval Base Subic Bay and Clark Air Base bases in the Philippines after the expiration of their leases in the early 1990s, many of the forces stationed there were relocated to Guam.

The removal of Guam's security clearance by President John F. Kennedy in 1963 allowed for the development of a tourism industry. The island's rapid economic development was fueled both by rapid growth in this industry as well as increased U.S. Federal Government spending during the 1980s and 1990s.

Since 1974, about 124 historic sites in Guam have been recognized under the U.S. National Register of Historic Places. Guam temporarily hosted 100,000 Vietnamese refugees in 1975's Operation New Life, and 6,600 Kurdish refugees in 1996.

On August 6, 1997, Guam was the site of the Korean Air Flight 801 aircraft accident. The Boeing 747–300 jetliner was preparing to land when it crashed into a hill, killing 228 of the 254 people on board.

The 1997 Asian financial crisis, which hit Japan particularly hard, severely affected Guam's tourism industry. Military cutbacks in the 1990s also disrupted the island's economy. Economic recovery was further hampered by devastation from Supertyphoons Paka in 1997 and Pongsona in 2002, as well as the effects of the September 11 terrorist attacks on tourism.

The recovery of the Japanese and Korean tourist markets reflected those countries' economic recoveries, as well as Guam's continued appeal as a weekend tropical retreat. U.S. military spending also dramatically increased as part of the war on terrorism.

The late 2000s saw proposals to strengthen U.S. military facilities, including negotiations to transfer 8,000 U.S. Marines from Okinawa. American forces were originally scheduled to relocate from Okinawa to Guam beginning in 2012 or 2013. However, that was set back due to budget constrains and local resistance to the additional military presence; Marine Corps Base Camp Blaz was activated in 2020 but the relocation is scheduled to start no later than by the first half of the 2020s.

In August 2017, North Korea warned that it might launch mid-range ballistic missiles into waters within 18 to 24 miles (29 to 39 km) of Guam, following an exchange of threats between the governments of North Korea and the United States.

In 2018, a Government Accountability Office report stated that Agent Orange was used as a commercial herbicide in Guam during the Vietnam and Korean Wars. An analysis of chemicals present in the island's soil, together with resolutions passed by Guam's legislature, suggest that Agent Orange was among the herbicides routinely used on and around military bases Anderson Air Force Base, Naval Air Station Agana, Guam. Despite the evidence, the Department of Defense continues to deny that Agent Orange was ever stored or used on Guam. Several Guam veterans have collected an enormous amount of evidence to assist in their disability claims for direct exposure to dioxin containing herbicides such as 2,4,5-T which are similar to the illness associations and disability coverage that has become standard for those who were harmed by the same chemical contaminant of Agent Orange used in Vietnam.

"Cosmopolitan" Guam poses particular challenges for Chamorus struggling to preserve their culture and identity in the face of acculturation. The increasing numbers of Chamorus, especially Chamoru youth, relocating to the U.S. Mainland has further complicated both the definition and preservation of Chamoru identity.

== See also ==
- Guam
- Villages of Guam
- San Vitores
- Chief Kepuha
