= First ladies and gentlemen of Guam =

Guamanian politician

First Gentleman of Guam
- Incumbent; Jeff Cook since January 7, 2019
- Residence: Government House (Agaña Heights)
- Term length: 4 Years
- Inaugural holder: Lourdes Perez Camacho

First Lady or First Gentleman of Guam is the title attributed to the spouse of the governor of Guam. The current first gentleman is Jeffrey Cook, husband of Governor Lou Leon Guerrero, who has held the position since January 7, 2019.

== List of first ladies and gentlemen of Guam ==
=== First ladies of American naval governors ===
First Lady	Image	Term begins	Term ends	Governor of Guam	Notes
Dorothy Swinburne McNamee		November 2, 1905	December 28, 1907	Luke McNamee	
Marie Charlier Potts		October 3, 1907	December 28, 1907	Templin Potts	
Dorothy Swinburne McNamee		October 3, 1907	December 28, 1907	Luke McNamee	
Syble Halpine Dorn		December 28, 1907	November 5, 1910	Edward John Dorn	
Maria Engracia Freyer		November 5, 1910	January 21, 1911	Frank Freyer	
Adele Trowbridge Salisbury		January 21, 1911	January 30, 1912	George Salisbury	
Augusta Cohen Coontz		January 30, 1912	September 23, 1913	Robert Coontz	
Mary Beardslee Hinds		September 23, 1913	March 28, 1914	Alfred Walton Hinds	
Margaret Sampson Smith		May 30, 1916	November 18, 1918	Roy Campbell Smith	
Mary Syme Wettengel		July 7, 1920	February 27, 1921	Ivan Wettengel	
Grace Walling Spore		February 27, 1921	February 7, 1922	James Sutherland Spore	
-		December 14, 1922	August 4, 1923	Adelbert Althouse	
Katherine Banks Price		August 4, 1923	August 26, 1924	Henry Bertram Price	
Marguerite Boynton Brown		August 26, 1924	August 7, 1926	Alfred Winsor Brown	
Elizabeth Harrison Shapley		April 7, 1926	June 11, 1929	Lloyd Stowell Shapley	
Sue Worthington Bradley		June 11, 1929	March 15, 1931	Willis W. Bradley	
La Mira N. Root		May 15, 1931	June 21, 1933	Edmund Root	
Mrs. G. A. Alexander		June 21, 1933	March 27, 1936	George A. Alexander	
Margherita Wood McCandlish		March 27, 1936	February 8, 1938	Benjamin McCandlish	
Pauline H. Alexander		February 8, 1938	April 20, 1940	James Thomas Alexander	
Annabel Parlett McMillin		April 20, 1940	December 10, 1941	George McMillin	

=== First ladies of American military governors ===
First Lady	Image	Term begins	Term ends	Governor of Guam	Notes
Eunice Renshaw Geiger		July 21, 1944	August 10, 1944	Roy Geiger	
Elizabeth Ammons Larsen		August 15, 1944	May 30, 1946	Henry Louis Larsen	
Mary Chenoweth Pownall		May 30, 1946	September 27, 1949	Charles Alan Pownall	

=== First ladies of appointed civilian governors (1949–1971) ===
First Lady	Image	Term begins	Term ends	Governor of Guam	Notes
Jeanne Rowe Skinner		September 17, 1949	April 22, 1953	Carlton Skinner	
Anita M. Elvidge		April 23, 1953	May 19, 1956	Ford Quint Elvidge	
Emma Louise Lowe		October 15, 1956	November 14, 1959	Richard Barrett Lowe	
Angela Perez Flores		July 9, 1960	May 20, 1961	Joseph Flores	
Vara Martin Daniel		May 20, 1961	January 20, 1963	William Daniel	
Delfina Tuncap Guerrero		January 20, 1963	July 20, 1969	Manuel Flores Leon Guerrero	
Lourdes Perez Camacho		July 20, 1969	January 4, 1971	Carlos Camacho	

=== First ladies and gentlemen of elected governors (1971–present) ===
First Lady	Image	Term begins	Term ends	Governor of Guam	Notes
Lourdes Perez Camacho		January 4, 1971	January 6, 1975	Carlos Camacho	
Madeleine Bordallo		January 6, 1975	January 1, 1979	Ricardo Bordallo	
Rose Baza Calvo		January 1, 1979	January 3, 1983	Paul McDonald Calvo	
Madeleine Bordallo		January 3, 1983	January 5, 1987	Ricardo Bordallo	
Rosanne Santos Ada		January 3, 1987	January 2, 1995	Joseph F. Ada	
Geri T. Gutierrez		January 2, 1995	January 6, 2003	Carl Gutierrez	
Joann Garcia Camacho		January 6, 2003	January 3, 2011	Felix Perez Camacho	
Christine M.S. Calvo		January 3, 2011	January 7, 2019	Eddie Calvo	
Jeffrey Cook		January 7, 2019	Present	Lou Leon Guerrero	
