= Naval Government of Guam =

1898–1950 U.S. Navy administration of Guam

- 1898–1950
- Flag Seal
- Motto: E Pluribus Unum "Out of Many, One"
- Anthem: "Hail, Columbia" (until 1931) "The Star-Spangled Banner"(from 1931)
- Status: United States military occupation (1898–1899); Unincorporated, unorganized territory (Note: Guam belongs to, but is not a part of, the United States. See the page for the Insular Cases for more information.) (1899–1941), (1944–1950); Japanese military occupation (1941–1944)
- Capital: Agana
- Official languages: English
- Common languages: English, Chamorro, Spanish
- Government: Military government
- President
  - 1899–1901: William McKinley
  - 1901–1909: Theodore Roosevelt
  - 1909–1913: William Howard Taft
  - 1913–1921: Woodrow Wilson
  - 1921–1923: Warren G. Harding
  - 1923–1929: Calvin Coolidge
  - 1929–1933: Herbert Hoover
  - 1933–1945: Franklin D. Roosevelt
  - 1945–1950: Harry S. Truman
- Naval Governor
  - 1899–1900: Richard Phillips Leary
  - 1949–1950: Carlton Skinner
- Historical era: Modern Era
  - Treaty of Paris: 10 December 1898
  - Guam Organic Act of 1950: 1 August 1950
Preceded by	Succeeded by
Captaincy General of the Philippines	Guam

The Naval Government of Guam was a provisional military government and later unincorporated, unorganized territory of the United States that was established during the Spanish–American War in 1898. It was under the administration of the United States Department of the Navy until the territory of Guam was organized in 1950.

== History ==
On June 21, 1898, the United States captured Guam in a bloodless landing during the Spanish–American War. The island was ceded to the United States by Spain on April 11, 1899, by the Treaty of Paris.

On December 23, 1898, Guam was placed under the administration of the United States Department of the Navy by President William McKinley for military protection and government. Between the American capture of Guam and installation of a Naval Governor in August 1899, there was a flux in governance of the island.

In 1922, the Naval Government banned the Chamorro language in schools and workplaces and destroyed all Chamorro dictionaries.

Between 1941 and 1944, the island was under occupation by Imperial Japanese forces during World War II.

In 1946, the seal of Guam was approved by Naval Governor Charles Alan Pownall. Later on February 9, 1948, the current flag of the territory was adopted.

On August 1, 1950, the Guam Organic Act of 1950 was signed into law by President Harry S. Truman, making Guam an organized territory.

== See also ==
- History of Guam
- American imperialism
- Insular Government of Porto Rico
- Insular Government of the Philippine Islands
- Commonwealth of the Philippines
