= A. M. Edwards =

American lawyer and statesman

Secretary of Guam
- In office 1960–1961
- President: Dwight D. Eisenhower
- Governor: Joseph Flores
- Preceded by: Marcellus Boss
- Succeeded by: Manuel Flores Leon Guerrero

Personal details
- Born: Adolph Monroe Edwards Jr. October 12, 1905 Kentucky, US
- Died: October 17, 1987 (aged 82)
- Resting place: Fort Mitchell, Kentucky
- Party: Republican
- Education: University of Kentucky (LLB)

Adolph Monroe Edwards Jr. (October 12, 1905 – October 17, 1987) was an American lawyer and statesman, who served as the Secretary of Guam from 1960 to 1961. Appointed by President Dwight D. Eisenhower, Edwards served in multiple roles as solicitor and counsel in the United States Department of the Interior.

== Early life and education ==
Edwards was born and raised in Kentucky. He graduated from Walton-Verona High School in Walton, Kentucky.

In 1926, Edwards began law school at the University of Kentucky College of Law. He was a member of the Pi Kappa Alpha fraternity, alongside future Governor Earle Clements. In 1929, Edwards received his law degree from the University of Kentucky.

== Career ==
After starting out as an attorney in Cynthiana, Kentucky, Edwards rose to the position of chief counsel of the Office of Territories at the United States Department of the Interior. In this position, he was the lawyer for the American administration of Alaska, Hawaii, the United States Virgin Islands, Guam, American Samoa, and the Trust Territory of the Pacific Islands. Edwards served as Associate Solicitor of the Department of the Interior from 1954 to 1960, working as chief counsel for the National Park Service, the Fish and Wildlife Service, and the Office of Territories.

In 1954, President Dwight D. Eisenhower appointed Edwards to a presidential commission created by the Revised Organic Act of the Virgin Islands, establishing American law in the Virgin Islands. He also served as general counsel to the Virgin Islands Company. In 1960, President Eisenhower appointed Edwards as Secretary of Guam, a predecessor position to the Lieutenant Governor of Guam.

An advocate for Alaskan and Hawaiian statehood, Edwards appeared multiple times before Congress as the Department of the Interior's advocate for statehood. In addition to serving as general counsel for the Alaska Railroad and Alaska International Rail and Highway Commission, he served as chief advisor to Mike Stepovich, who was serving as the acting Governor of Alaska in 1957.

After leaving government service during the presidency of John F. Kennedy, Edwards worked for the American Medical Association and the Louisiana State Medical Society. He retired in 1972, but continued to serve on the board of a group advocating for building more low-income housing.

== Personal life ==
Edwards was married to Edna Engelbrecht Edwards (1913–2011). They had one son, Adolph III.
