= Elvidge =

Elvidge is a surname. Notable people with the surname include:

- Anita M. Elvidge (1895–1981), artist and First Lady of Guam
- Chris Elvidge (1892–?), English footballer
- Ford Quint Elvidge (1892–1980), Governor of Guam
- John Elvidge (born 1951), British civil servant
- June Elvidge (1893–1965), American actress
- Ron Elvidge (1923–2019), New Zealand rugby union player
