= Angela Perez Flores =

Guamanian First Lady of Guam

First Lady of Guam
- In role July 9, 1960 – May 20, 1961
- Governor: Joseph Flores

Personal details
- Party: Republican
- Spouse: Joseph Flores
- Children: 1
- Occupation: First Lady of Guam

Angela Perez Flores is a Guamanian former First Lady of Guam.

== Early life ==
In 1900, Flores was born in Guam.

== Career ==
In 1960, when Joseph Flores was appointed by President Dwight D. Eisenhower as the Governor of Guam, Flores became the First Lady of Guam on July 9, 1960, until May 20, 1961.

== Personal life ==
Flores' husband was Joseph Flores, a Guamanian newspaper publisher, founder of the Guam Daily News (Pacific Daily News), banker, co-founder of Guam Savings and Loan (present day BankPacific), and Governor of Guam. They had one child, Edward. Flores and her family lived in San Francisco, California. In 1947, Flores and her family moved back to Guam.

Flores' grandson Philip J. Flores became a banker and businessman. He is the Chairman, President and CEO of BankPacific. He is also the Chairman and President of Our Lady of Peace Memorial Gardens Inc. He is also involved in business in the industrial laundry, recycling and solid waste handling industries.

In 1982, Flores died in Agana, Guam. Flores is interred at Our Lady of Peace Memorial Gardens in Yona, Guam.
