= The John Dank Show =

- Origin: Guam
- Genres: Reggae, Rock, Alternative
- Years active: 2010–present
- Labels: Independent
- Website: www.thejohndankshows.com

The John Dank Show is a band hailing from the American Territory Guam.

== Name origin ==
The band's name, "The John Dank Show," refers to its frontman, John "Dank" Cruz. The name actually originates from the first initials of the founding members' names: John, Danton ("Da"), Francis ("nk"), and Paolo ("Show") Cruz.

== Early history ==
The John Dank Show was formed in 2010 by Frankie McJohn (lead vocals/rhythm guitar), John Tyquiengco (lead guitar/vocals), Danton Cruz (bass/vocals), and Paolo "The Show" Cruz (drums). The band began by performing in local venues around Guam, building a reputation for their energetic performances and unique sound. Influenced by a range of musical genres, including rock and reggae, the band has been compared to artists like Earth, Wind & Fire for their dynamic production and rhythmic grooves.

== Career milestones ==
The band's debut EP, The John Dank Show, released in August 2015, achieved notable success, reaching #4 on the iTunes Reggae Charts and peaking at #11 on the Billboard World Reggae Charts. Their follow-up album, Lights, released in 2016, further solidified their presence in the reggae scene, with the single "EZ4U" featuring Gabrielle Paynter and earning significant streaming numbers. Lights also saw the band embarking on a North American tour, where they performed alongside notable acts.

The release of their third studio album, 1990, in September 2019, marked a more mature phase for the band while retaining their signature tempo changes and infectious hooks. The album demonstrated their continued evolution and musical prowess.

== Tours and performances ==
The John Dank Show has toured extensively, including notable performances at the One Love Cali Reggae Festival and a national tour with Eric Rachmany of Rebelution. They have also performed at major events such as the Reggae Rise Up Festival, Cali Roots Festival, and Hafa Fest.

== Awards and honors ==
The band received the VANS Warped Tour Battle of the Bands in 2011, the Island Music Awards for Best Reggae Band in 2016 and 2019, and was named Best Band by the Pacific Daily News in 2016, 2018, and 2019.

== Discography ==
- The John Dank Show (EP, 2015)
- Lights (Album, 2016)
- 1990 (EP, 2019)

== Current members ==
- Frankie McJohn – Lead vocals, rhythm guitar
- John Tyquiengco – Lead guitar, vocals
- Danton Cruz – Bass, vocals
- Paolo "The Show" Cruz – Drums
