= Mary Beardslee Hinds =

American First Lady of Guam (1874–1952)

First Lady of Guam
- In role September 23, 1913 – March 28, 1914
- Governor: Alfred Walton Hinds

Personal details
- Born: Mary May Miller Beardslee; July 4, 1874
- Died: December 18, 1952 (aged 78)
- Spouse: Alfred Walton Hinds
- Children: 1
- Occupation: First Lady of Guam
- Other names: Mary Miller Beardslee, Mary May Miller Beardslee, Mary B. Hinds, Mary Hinds, Mrs. A. W. Hinds

Mary Beardslee Hinds (1874–1952) was an American First Lady of Guam.

== Early life ==
On July 4, 1874, Hinds was born as Mary May Miller Beardslee. Hinds' father was Hamilton White Beardslee (1840–1907). Hinds' mother was Lucy Putnam (nee Phelps Howson) Beardslee (1850–1926). Hinds had two siblings, Kenneth and Doris.

== Career ==
In 1913, when Alfred Walton Hinds was appointed the Naval Governor of Guam, Hinds became the First Lady of Guam on September 23, 1913, until March 28, 1914.

== Personal life ==
On April 10, 1902, at May Memorial Church in Syracuse, New York, Hinds married Alfred Walton Hinds (1874-1957), who later became a Naval officer and Naval Governor of Guam. Hinds' maid of honor was her sister Doris Beardslee; she also had four other bridesmaids. They had one son, Walton Beardslee Hinds (1904-1973). Hinds and her family lived in places such as New York, Bremerton, Washington, Guam, and Coronado, California.

In 1931, Hinds and her family moved to Coronado, California.

Hinds' son Walton Beardslee Hinds became a Commander of US Navy and became attached to USS Atlanta.

On December 18, 1952, Hinds died. Hinds is interred at Fort Rosecrans National Cemetery in Point Loma, San Diego, California.
