= Wettengel Rugby Field =

Coordinates: 13°31′29″N 144°49′57″E

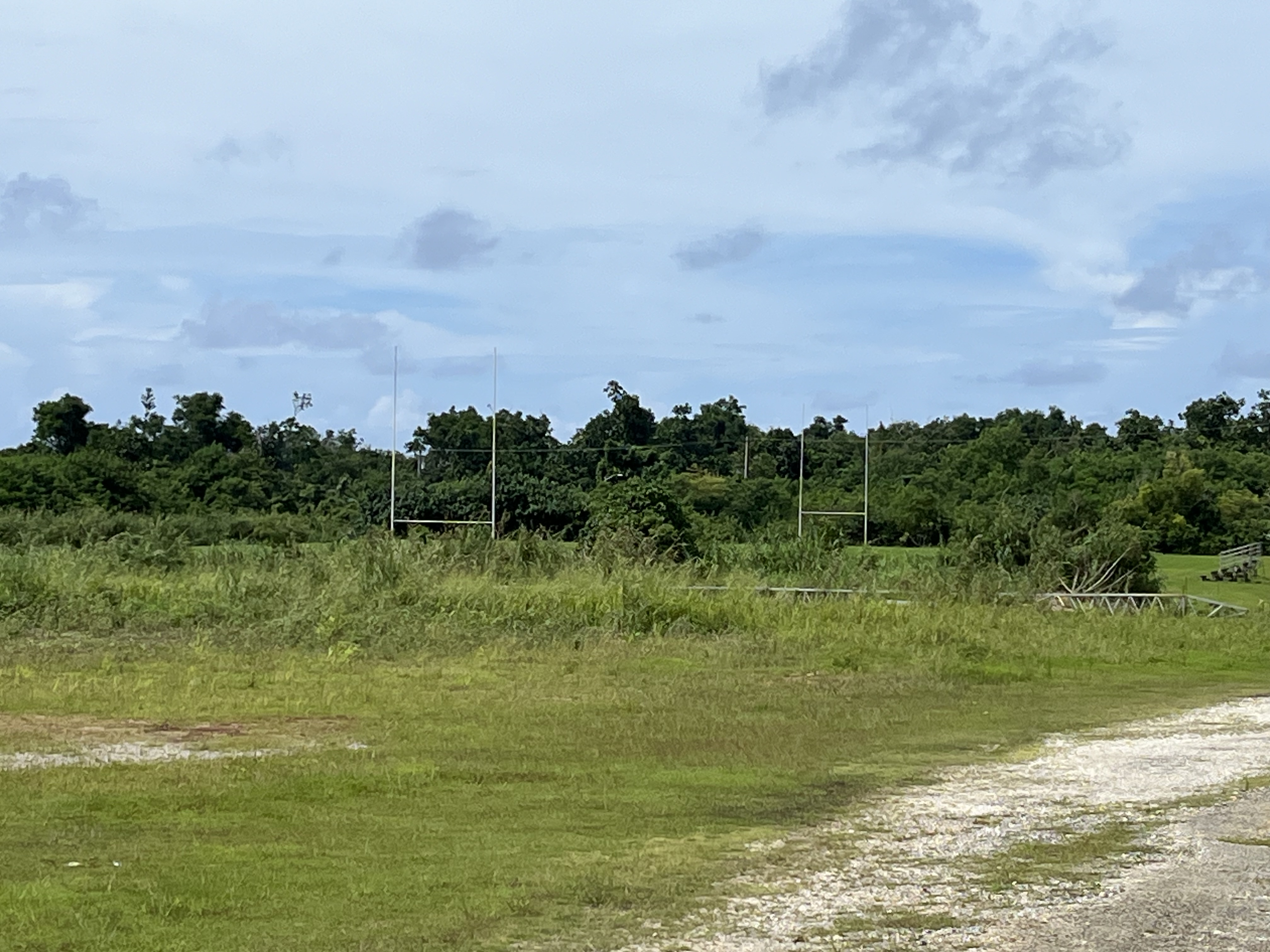
Wettengel Rugby Field

Wettengel Rugby Field is a multi-use stadium in Dededo, Guam. It is used for rugby football and association football games. The stadium holds 1,500 people. It is named for the former Naval Governor of Guam, Ivan Wettengel. It has also held Guam junior rugby middle school games.
