= 1933 Guamanian legislative election =

Parliamentary elections were held in Guam in 1933.

== Results ==
Due to the lack of public interest in a Congress whose decisions could be ignored by the governor, too few candidates ran for election, resulting in twelve seats being unfilled. These seats were filled by candidates nominated by the Governor.
