= Governor Gilmer =

Governor Gilmer may refer to:

- George Rockingham Gilmer (1790–1859), 34th Governor of Georgia
- Thomas Walker Gilmer (1802–1844), 28th Governor of Virginia
- William Gilmer (1863–1955), 22nd and 24th Naval Governor of Guam

== See also ==
- Governor Gilmore (disambiguation)
