= Governor Stone =

Governor Stone may refer to:

- David Stone (politician) (1770–1818), governor of North Carolina, 1808–1810
- John Hoskins Stone (1750–1804), 7th Governor of Maryland
- John Marshall Stone (1830–1900), governor of Mississippi, 1876–1882 and 1890–1896
  - Governor Stone (schooner), a cargo freighter built in 1877, named for the Mississippi governor
- Raymond Stone (fl. 1900s), governor of Guam in 1904
- William A. Stone (1846–1920), 22nd Governor of Pennsylvania
- William J. Stone (1848–1918), governor of Missouri, 1893–1897
- William M. Stone (1827–1893), 6th Governor of Iowa
- William Stone (Maryland governor) (1603–1660), governor of the Province of Maryland, 1649–1655
