= Governor Alexander =

Governor Alexander may refer to:

- Archie Alexander (1888–1958), Governor of the United States Virgin Islands
- Edward Bruce Alexander (1872–1955), Acting Governor of British Ceylon
- George A. Alexander (1884–1969), Naval Governor of Guam
- James Thomas Alexander (1888–1952), Naval Governor of Guam
- Lamar Alexander (born 1940), Governor of Tennessee
- Moses Alexander (1853–1932), Governor of Idaho
- Nathaniel Alexander (governor) (1756–1808), Governor of North Carolina
- William Alexander (the younger) (1600s–1638), Governor of Acadia
- William Alexander, 1st Earl of Stirling (1560s–1640), Governor of Acadia
