= Governor Leon Guerrero =

Governor Leon Guerrero may refer to:

- Lou Leon Guerrero (born 1950), Senator in the Guam Legislature and current Governor of Guam
- Manuel Flores Leon Guerrero (1914–1985), Senator in the Guam Legislature and former Governor of Guam
