= Walton-Verona High School =

Coordinates: 38.8633°N 84.6187°W

- 16 School Road Walton, Kentucky 41094; United States

Information
- Type: Public school
- Established: 1954
- School district: Walton-Verona Independent Schools
- Principal: Joanne Nesmith
- Teaching staff: 36.00 (FTE)
- Grades: 9 to 12
- Enrollment: 557 (2023–2024)
- Student to teacher ratio: 15.47
- Color
- Nickname: Bearcats
- Feeder schools: Walton-Verona Middle School
- Website: https://waltonveronaisdky.sites.thrillshare.com/page/high-school

Walton-Verona High School is a public high school located at 16 School Road in Walton, Kentucky, United States. It is in the Walton-Verona Independent Schools district.

== History ==
The school's history dates back to 1880. At that time, there were two school districts, one in Verona and another in Walton. The two consolidated into one school district in 1935. A grade school was maintained in Verona, and a high school in Walton became known as the Walton-Verona Independent Schools. Walton-Verona Middle School was constructed in 1954 as a high school, with additions in 1962, 1973, 1989 and 1993. A new high school wing was constructed in 2007.

The school's athletic teams are known as the Bearcats.

== Notable alumni ==
- A. M. Edwards, lawyer and statesman who served as secretary of Guam from 1960 to 1961
