= Margherita Wood McCandlish =

American First Lady of Guam

First Lady of Guam
- In role March 27, 1936 – February 8, 1938
- Governor: Benjamin McCandlish

Personal details
- Born: December 31, 1892 Manhattan, New York City, New York
- Died: August 25, 1954 (aged 61) Hartsville, South Carolina
- Spouse: Benjamin McCandlish
- Occupation: First Lady of Guam
- Other names: Margherita Wilson 'Rita' Wood, Margherita Wilson Wood McCandlish, Margherita W. W. McCandlish, Margherita W. McCandlish, Margherita McCandlish, M. W. McCandlish

Margherita Wood McCandlish (December 31, 1892 - August 25, 1954) is an American former First Lady of Guam.

== Early life ==
On December 31, 1892, McCandlish was born as Margherita Wilson Wood in Manhattan, New York City, New York. McCandlish's father was Franklyn Wilson Wood. McCandlish's mother was Clara Wilson Wood. McCandlish has two brothers, Ralph Frederick Wood and Franklyn Wilson Wood Jr.

== Career ==
In 1936, when Benjamin McCandlish was appointed as the military Governor of Guam, McCandlish became the First Lady of Guam on March 27, 1936, until February 8, 1938.

== Personal life ==
On June 12, 1914 in Manila, Philippine Islands, McCandlish married Benjamin Vaughan McCandlish, who later became a United States Navy officer and the 36th Naval Governor of Guam. McCandlish and her family lived in places such as Guam and near Bishopsville, South Carolina.

McCandlish's brother Ralph Wood became an Ensign in the United States Navy, and later a Rear Admiral.

On August 25, 1954, McCandlish died in a hospital in Hartsville, South Carolina. McCandlish is interred at Blandford Cemetery in Petersburg, Virginia.

After McCandlish's death, her husband remarried. On October 16, 1975, McCandlish's husband died in Darlington, South Carolina. He is interred at Blandford Cemetery in Petersburg, Virginia.
