= Margaret Aldrich Smith =

American First Lady of Guam (1863–1929)

First Lady of Guam
- In role May 30, 1916 – November 18, 1918
- Governor: Roy Campbell Smith

Personal details
- Born: Margaret Aldrich Sampson; October 15, 1863 Palmyra, New York, US
- Died: May 21, 1929 (aged 65) Newport, Rhode Island, US
- Spouse: Roy Campbell Smith
- Children: 3
- Parents: William Thomas Sampson (1840–1902) (father); Margaret Sexton Sampson (1842-1878) (mother)
- Occupation: First Lady of Guam

Margaret Aldrich Smith (1863–1929) was an American First Lady of Guam.

== Early life ==
On October 15, 1863, Smith was born as Margaret Aldrich Sampson in Palmyra, New York. Smith's father was Rear admiral William Thomas Sampson. Smith's mother was Margaret Sexton Sampson. Smith has four siblings: Catherine, Hannah, Olive, and Susan.

== Career ==
In 1916, when Roy Campbell Smith was appointed the Naval Governor of Guam, Smith became the First Lady of Guam on May 30, 1916, until November 18, 1918.

== Personal life ==
On October 11, 1887, in Annapolis, Maryland, Smith married Roy Campbell Smith, who later became a Naval officer and the Naval Governor of Guam. They had three children, Roy, Marjorie, and William. Smith and her family lived in several places including Guam and Newport, Rhode Island.

Smith's daughter Marjorie Sampson Smith became a sponsor of USS Sampson (DD-63) on March 4, 1916. It was named for Rear admiral William Thomas Sampson, Smith's father. In 1918, Smith's daughter Marjorie Sampson Smith married Spotswood Dandridge Bowers, a lawyer.

On May 21, 1929, Smith died in Newport, Rhode Island. Smith is interred at Lakewood Cemetery in Cooperstown, New York.
