= Secretary of Guam =

- Coat of arms of Guam
- Precursor: None
- Formation: September 17, 1949
- First holder: Randall Herman
- Final holder: Kurt Moylan
- Abolished: January 4, 1971
- Succession: None

The secretary of Guam was the equivalent of the lieutenant governor when the governorship was still appointed by the president of the United States. The office became the lieutenant governor of Guam when island residents began electing the position, along with the governor, rather than having them appointed.

== Duties ==
Public Law 90-497 illustrated most of the Secretary of Guam's duties and powers. The Guam Organic Act of 1950 established that the Secretary of Guam would be "a lesser official . . . who would perform the functions of Lieutenant Governor as well as other administrative duties." The Elective Governor Act of 1968 replaced the office with that of an official, elected Lieutenant Governor, which went into effect one year later.

Public law 9-69, passed on July 7, 1967, mandated that all administrative regulations must be filed with the Secretary of Guam for compilation and publishing. These rules did not become effective until such filing. These duties were transferred to the Legislature of Guam by P.L. 12-41 on September 17, 1973.

== List of secretaries of Guam ==
In total, there were seven secretaries of Guam, three of which, William Corbett, Marcellus Boss, and Manuel Flores Leon Guerrero, went on to become Governors of Guam. Kurt Moylan also served as the first elected Lieutenant Governor of Guam.

- Randall S. Herman (1950 – 1956)
- William Corbett (1953 – 1956)
- Marcellus Boss (1956 – 1959)
- A. M. Edwards (1960 – 1961)
- Manuel Flores Leon Guerrero (1961 – 1963)
- Denver Dickerson (1963 – 1969)
- Kurt Moylan (1969 - January 1, 1971 termination of position)

== Assistant Secretary of Guam ==
Richard Barrett Lowe originated the position of Assistant Secretary of Guam early in his term, naming Manuel Flores Leon Guerrero to the position.

== Additional sources ==
- Babauta, Leo (4 October 2009). "Republican Party of Guam". Guampedia.
- Cunningham, Lawrence; Janice Beaty (2001). A History of Guam (illustrated ed.). Bess Press. ISBN 1-57306-047-X.
- "1 GAR - General Provisions" (PDF). Unified Courts of Guam. Archived from the original (PDF) on 2006-07-12.
- Rogers, Robert (1995). Destiny's Landfall: A History of Guam. University of Hawaii Press. p. 0824816781.
- Supreme Court of Guam (11 June 2004). "In Re: Request of Governor Felix P. Camacho Relative to the Interpretation and Application of Sections 6 and 9 of the Organic Act of Guam" (PDF). Hagåtña, Guam. Archived from the original (PDF) on 11 July 2011.
- "The States". National Association of Secretaries of State.
- "Title 48—Territories and Insular Possessions" (PDF). Office of the Law Revision Counsel. Archived from the original (PDF) on 5 August 2009.
