= The Guam Daily Post =

Newspaper based in Tamuning, Guam

Guam Daily Post
- Type: Daily newspaper
- Format: Tabloid
- Owner: Ho S. Eun Trust
- Editor-in-chief: Melissa Bettis
- General manager: Henry Taitano
- Founded: 2004
- Language: English
- Headquarters: 388 S. Marine Corps Dr. Suite 301; Tamuning, Guam 96913
- Country: United States
- Circulation: 17,000 (as of 2019)
- OCLC number: 1035108205
- Website: postguam.com

The Guam Daily Post is a newspaper based in Tamuning, in the United States territory of Guam. It is owned by the Ho S. Eun Trust and is published seven days a week.

== History ==
The paper started in 2004 as the Guam edition of the Marianas Variety, which is based in Saipan.

Ho S. Eun, the owner of local construction firm Core Tech International, bought the paper in 2015 and renamed it to The Guam Daily Post, when the newspaper was reportedly not making a profit.

The Post and Pacific Daily News are the only two newspapers on Guam; Post CEO Mindy Aguon states that it surpassed Daily News circulation in late 2017.

In January 2023, The Post stopped selling printed copies in the island’s 11 Navy Exchange stores. As of June 2023, the paper has just over 10,000 print subscribers, 7,500 digital subscribers and receives more than 1.5 million page views per month on its website.
