= Delfina Tuncap Guerrero =

Guamanian First Lady of Guam

First Lady of Guam
- In role January 20, 1963 – July 20, 1969
- Governor: Manuel Flores Leon Guerrero

Personal details
- Born: March 9, 1915 Guam
- Died: January 5, 2004 (aged 88) Guam
- Party: Democratic
- Spouse: Manuel Flores Leon Guerrero (m. 1934; died 1985)
- Children: 7
- Parent: Dolores Namauleg Tuncap (mother)
- Occupation: First Lady of Guam
- Other names: Delfina Guerrero, Delfina Tuncap, Delfina T. Guerrero, Delfina Tuncap Leon Guerrero

Delfina Tuncap Guerrero (1915 – 2004) was First Lady of Guam from 1963 to 1969.

== Early life ==
On March 9, 1915, Guerrero was born as Delfina Tuncap, a Chamorro, in Agana, Guam. Guerrero's mother was Dolores Namauleg Tuncap.

== Career ==
In 1961, when Manuel Flores Leon Guerrero was appointed by President John F. Kennedy as the Governor of Guam, Guerrero became the First Lady of Guam on January 20, 1963, until July 20, 1969.

== Personal life ==
In 1934, Guerrero married Manuel Flores Leon Guerrero, who later became a Guamanian politician and Governor of Guam. They had seven children, Alfred Delfin (b.1935), Lolita Mariguita (1936–1982), Rudolpho Beltram (1938–1988), Evelyna Rebecca (b.1940), Teresita Recqual (b.1946), Manuel Flores (b.1947), and Patricia Christine (1953–1984). Guerrero and her family lived in Agana, Guam.

Guerrero's daughter Lolita Leon Guerrero Huxel (1936–1982) became a Chamorro linguist and professor at University of Guam. She died in Hawaii.

Guerrero's daughter Dr. Teresita L.G. Cottrell became a neuropsychologist.

On January 5, 2004, Guerrero died in Guam. She was 88 years old. Guerrero is interred at Pigo Catholic Cemetery in Hagåtña, Guam.
