= Walton-Verona Independent Schools =

School district in Kentucky, United States

Address
- 16 School Rd Walton, Kentucky, 41094; United States

District information
- Grades: Pre-school - 12
- Superintendent: Matt Baker
- NCES District ID: 2105700

Students and staff
- Enrollment: 1,600
- Staff: 109.00 (on an FTE basis)
- Student–teacher ratio: 16.44

Other information
- Telephone: (859) 485-4181
- Website: wv.kyschools.us

Walton-Verona Independent Schools is a public school district in Boone County in the U.S. state of Kentucky, based in Walton.

The district includes the majority of Walton (the portion in Boone County) and all of Verona.

== Schools ==
The Walton-Verona Independent Schools School District has one elementary school, one middle school, and one high school.

- Walton-Verona Elementary School and Walton-Verona Intermediate School are located in Verona, while Walton-Verona Middle School and Walton-Verona High School are located in Walton.
