= William Corbett (politician) =

American politician

William T. Corbett

Governor of Guam (Interim)
- In office May 19, 1956 – October 2, 1956
- Preceded by: Ford Quint Elvidge
- Succeeded by: Richard Barrett Lowe

2nd Secretary of Guam
- In office 1953–1956
- Governor: Ford Quint Elvidge
- Preceded by: Randall S. Herman
- Succeeded by: Marcellus Boss

Personal details
- Born: 1902 Avalon, Pennsylvania, U.S.
- Died: April 17, 1971 (aged 68–69) Virginia, U.S.
- Party: Republican
- Relatives: Robert J. Corbett (brother)
- Education: University of Pittsburgh, University of Pittsburgh School of Law
- Occupation: Lawyer

William T. Corbett (1902 – April 17, 1971) was an American attorney, who served as Secretary of Guam under Ford Quint Elvidge, and later became as the interim Governor of Guam from May 19, 1956, to October 2, 1956. Graduating from the University of Pittsburgh College of Arts and Sciences in 1924 and the University of Pittsburgh School of Law in 1927, Corbett opened a private workers' compensation law firm before joining the United States Department of the Interior.

Corbett was the brother of Representative Robert J. Corbett. He died on April 17, 1971, at the Northern Virginia Doctors Hospital at the age of 69.

Preceded by Ford Quint Elvidge	Governor of Guam (acting); 1956	Succeeded by Richard Barrett Lowe
Preceded by Randall Herman	Secretary of Guam; 1953–1956	Succeeded by Marcellus Boss
