= Richard Barrett Lowe =

American Governor of Guam (1902–1972)

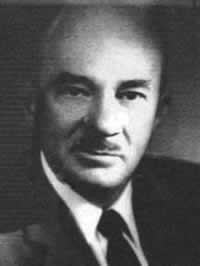

3rd Governor of Guam
- In office October 15, 1956 – November 14, 1959
- Appointed by: Dwight D. Eisenhower
- Preceded by: Ford Quint Elvidge; William Corbett (acting)
- Succeeded by: Marcellus Boss (acting); Joseph Flores

Governor of American Samoa
- In office October 1, 1953 – October 15, 1956
- Preceded by: Lawrence M. Judd
- Succeeded by: Peter Tali Coleman

Personal details
- Born: July 8, 1902 Madison, South Dakota, U.S.
- Died: April 16, 1972 (aged 69) Alexandria, Virginia, U.S.
- Party: Republican
- Spouse: Emma Louise Lowe
- Education: Eastern State Teacher's College, University of South Dakota
- Occupation: Educator, Politician

Military service
- Allegiance: United States
- Branch/service: United States Navy
- Rank: Commander
- Commands: V-12 Navy College Training Program at the University of Nebraska and Creighton University

Richard Barrett Lowe (July 8, 1902 – April 16, 1972) was the governor (and fifth appointed civil governor) of American Samoa (October 1, 1953 – October 15, 1956) and the eighth American governor (and third civilian governor) of Guam (October 15, 1956 – November 14, 1959). He was also a prominent educator and United Nations observer.

== Early life and education ==
Lowe was born on July 8, 1902, in Madison, South Dakota, the youngest of three children. Lowe graduated from Madison High School, and studied at the University of Wisconsin for one year before transferring to the Normal school at Eastern State Teacher's College, where he graduated in 1929. During his senior year, he wrote the premise for and directed the film Dacotah, believed to be the first full-length motion picture filmed entirely on a college campus. Lowe later received his master's degree from the University of South Dakota; he received an honorary Doctor of Education from Ottawa University in 1942.

== Career ==
Following his graduation from Eastern State, Lowe served as an educator and superintendent in various places in South Dakota, eventually becoming president of the South Dakota Education Association. In February 1946, Lowe became the dean of the Nebraska State Teachers College in Peru, Nebraska. While helping with a Naval Reserves recruiting drive, Lowe convinced those in charge to emphasize the importance of education by using the slogan "Stay in School". Lowe was offered the office of Director of Education, first of American Samoa, and later of Guam in the 1950s, but turned down both positions in hopes of obtaining a governorship.

After his governorships, Lowe became the United Nations observer for the National Education Association in 1964.

== Military service ==
During World War II, Lowe served in the United States Navy as the commanding officer of the V-12 Navy College Training Program at the University of Nebraska and Creighton University. He also served as an officer on Tinian, Guam, and Okinawa Island. In 1947, Lowe assisted in a recruitment drive for the United States Navy Reserve, where he convinced the Navy Recruiting Office to adopt the slogan "Stay in School".

== Governorship ==
For a little less than two weeks in 1953, Lowe was the Governor of two territories simultaneously, the only time this has happened in the 20th century.

=== American Samoa (1953–1956) ===
Lowe became governor of American Samoa in 1953. While governor, he helped foster the tuna canning industry, now one of American Samoa's primary sources of employment. Lowe was appointed Governor of American Samoa in 1953 when the Department of the Interior (DOI) sought an experienced and healthy individual willing to remain in the territory for at least five years. The DOI had previously appointed four governors over the past two years and desired more stability. Lowe, from Sioux Falls, South Dakota, traveled to Washington, D.C., to study all the files about American Samoa and interview officials he would be working with. His thorough preparation and commitment to helping the locals pleased the local leadership upon his arrival. Lowe presented a plan to the American Samoa Legislature aimed at fostering cooperation, which would lead to greater understanding and eventually to more local self-government. This plan included appointing a Fono liaison officer, John C. Cool, and relocating certain legislative committees to the Executive Building to facilitate closer collaboration with the Governor. After two months, Lowe reported to the DOI that things were in good order. Before becoming Governor of Guam in 1956, he initiated the development of an American Samoa Constitution by appointing a Constitutional Committee.

=== Guam (1956–1960) ===
Ford Quint Elvidge resigned the governorship in 1956, and President Dwight Eisenhower appointed Lowe to the governorship. While governor, Lowe appointed many Chamorros to high public office, including the appointment of Manuel Flores Leon Guerrero as Assistant Secretary of Guam. Upon Lowe's resignation in 1960, Eisenhower appointed Joseph Flores, the first Chamorro Governor of the island, as Lowe's replacement.

=== House Restoration ===
After retiring from politics, Lowe began restoring houses in the Washington, D.C., area, including the George Washington Town House in Alexandria, Virginia. Rebuilt in 1960, Lowe used bricks and stones from an excavation of the house and erected the structure on the original foundation.

== Personal life ==
Lowe died in Alexandria, Virginia, on April 16, 1972, at the age of 69. He is buried at Graceland Cemetery in Madison, South Dakota.

== Bibliography ==
- Papers, 1936–70.
- Problems in Paradise : The View from Government House. New York: Pageant Press. 1967.

Government offices
Preceded by Lawrence M. Judd	Governor of American Samoa; 1953–1956	Succeeded by Peter Tali Coleman
Preceded by William Corbett (Acting)	Governor of Guam; 1956–1959	Succeeded by Marcellus G. Boss (Acting)
