= 1994 Guamanian gubernatorial election =

1994 Guam gubernatorial election
- November 8, 1994
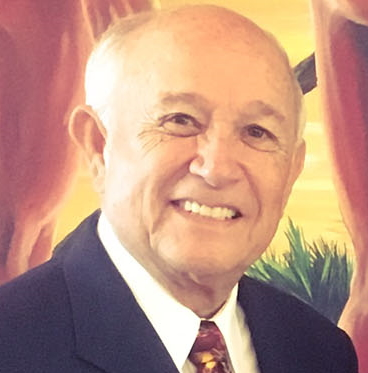

Nominee	Carl Gutierrez	Francisco Blas Aguon, Sr.
Party	Democratic	Republican
Popular vote	23,405	19,281
Percentage	54.83%	45.17%
Governor before election
Joseph Franklin Ada
Republican
Elected Governor
Carl Gutierrez
Democratic

The 1994 Guam gubernatorial election was held on November 8, 1994, in order to elect the Governor of Guam. Democratic nominee and incumbent member of the Guam Legislature Carl Gutierrez defeated Republican nominee Francisco Blas Aguon Sr.

== General election ==
On election day, November 8, 1994, Democratic nominee Carl Gutierrez won the election by a margin of 4,124 votes against his opponent Republican nominee Francisco Blas Aguon Sr., thereby gaining Democratic control over the office of Governor. Guttierrez was sworn in as the 6th Governor of Guam on January 2, 1995.

=== Results ===
Guam gubernatorial election, 1994
Party	Candidate	Votes	%
Democratic	Carl Gutierrez	23,405	54.83%
Republican	Francisco Blas Aguon, Sr.	19,281	45.17%
Total votes		42,686	100.00%
Democratic gain from Republican			
