= Palau Horizon =

The Palau Horizon is a newspaper headquartered in Koror, Palau. The newspaper was launched in Palau in 1998 and had a circulation of approximately 8,000 readers in 2008. The newspaper is a sister publication of the larger Marianas Variety News & Views.
