= Marcellus Boss =

American politician

Governor of Guam Interim
- In office November 14, 1959 – August 22, 1960
- Preceded by: Richard Barrett Lowe
- Succeeded by: Joseph F. Flores

Secretary of Guam
- In office November 1, 1957 – 1959
- Governor: Richard Barrett Lowe
- Preceded by: William Corbett
- Succeeded by: A. M. Edwards

Member of the Kansas State Senate
- In office 1945–1949

Personal details
- Born: Marcellus Graeme Boss; January 24, 1901 Plymouth, Indiana, U.S.
- Died: March 21, 1967 (aged 66) Kansas, U.S.
- Party: Republican

Marcellus Graeme Boss (January 24, 1901 – March 21, 1967) was an interim Governor of Guam from November 14, 1959, until his resignation on August 22, 1960.

Boss first entered Guamanian administration with a 1957 appointment by President Dwight D. Eisenhower to the post of Secretary of Guam. He also served as a Republican member of the Kansas State Senate prior to becoming involved in the government of Guam. He was city clerk and city attorney of Kiowa, Kansas, and had a thirty-year law career in Columbus, Kansas. He died of a heart attack on March 21, 1967, and was buried at the City Cemetery in Columbus, Kansas.

Preceded by Richard Barrett Lowe	Governor of Guam (Acting); 1959–1960	Succeeded by Joseph F. Flores
