= Randall S. Herman =

British Indian-born Guamanian politician

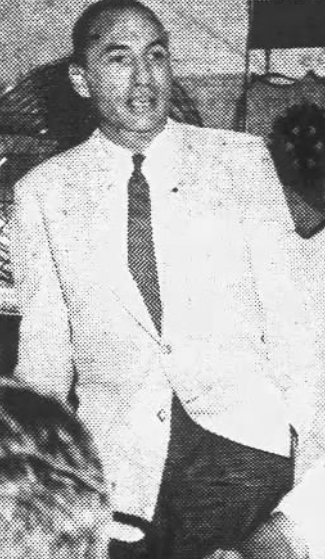
- Herman in 1956

Secretary of Guam
- In office 1950–1956
- Appointed by: Harry S. Truman
- Governor: Carlton Skinner; Ford Quint Elvidge
- Preceded by: Office established
- Succeeded by: William Corbett

Governor of Guam
- Acting
- In office February 20, 1953 – April 22, 1953
- Preceded by: Carlton Skinner
- Succeeded by: Ford Quint Elvidge

Personal details
- Born: Randall Stuart Herman; May 29, 1914 Kodaikanal, British India
- Died: November 12, 1998 (aged 84) Pebble Beach, California, U.S.
- Party: Independent
- Education: Carleton College; Princeton University

Randall Stuart Herman (May 29, 1914 – November 12, 1998) was a British Indian-born Guamanian politician. An independent, he served as secretary of Guam from 1950 to 1956 and as acting governor of Guam in 1953.

== Life and career ==
Herman was born in Kodaikanal, British India, the son of Harold Herman and Winifred Wilcox. At an early age, he emigrated to the United States. He attended and graduated from Carleton College. He also attended Princeton University, completing his wartime military and civil government course.

Herman served as secretary of Guam from 1950 to 1956. During his service as secretary, in 1953, he briefly served as acting governor of Guam.

== Death ==
Herman died on November 12, 1998, in Pebble Beach, California, at the age of 84.
