= Denver Dickerson =

American politician (1914–1981)

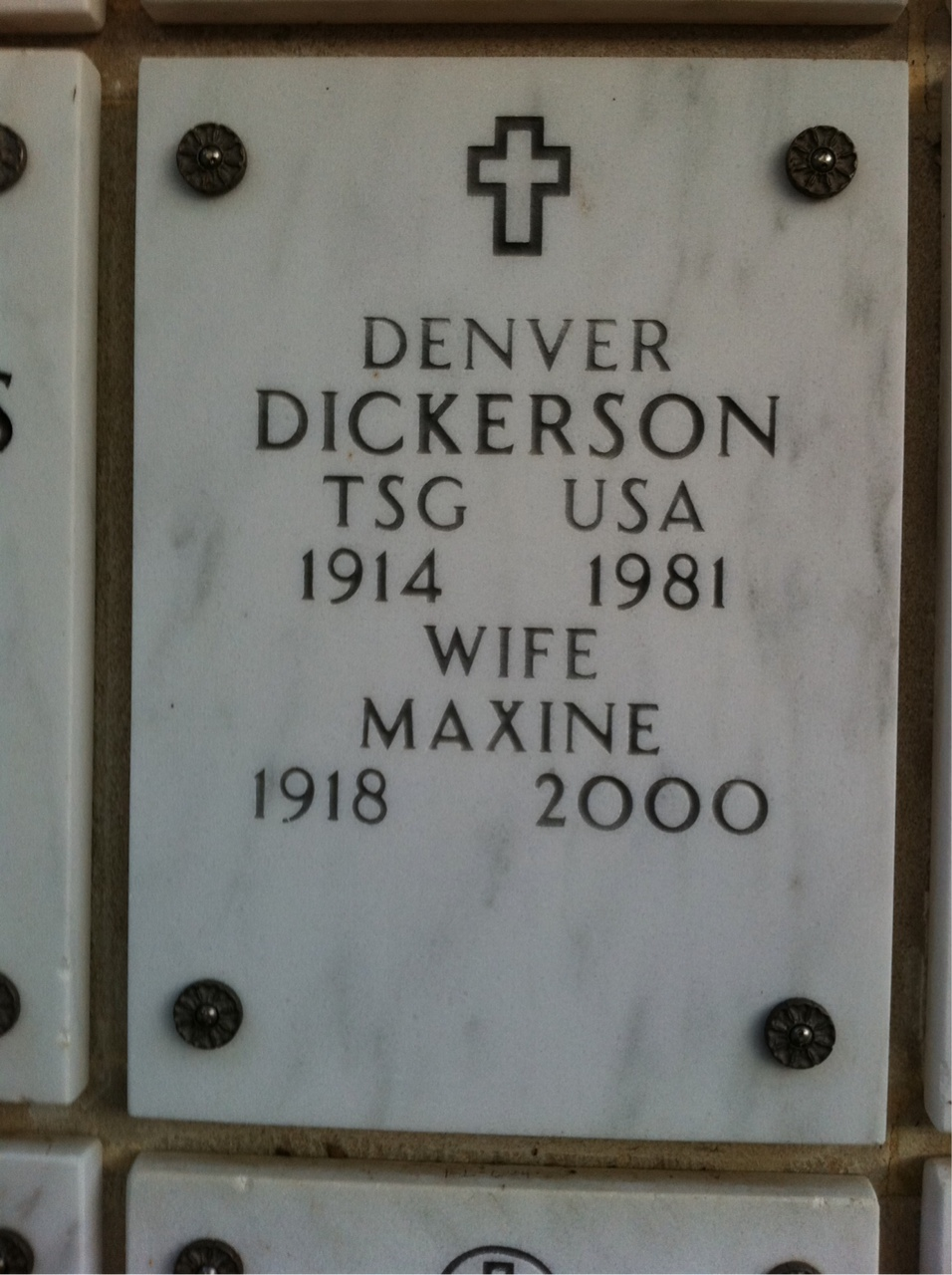
- Grave at Arlington National Cemetery

6th Secretary of Guam
- In office March 1, 1963 – July 20, 1969
- Governor: Manuel Flores Leon Guerrero
- Preceded by: Manuel Flores Leon Guerrero
- Succeeded by: Kurt Moylan

37th Speaker of the Nevada Assembly
- In office January 1943 – October 1943
- Governor: Edward P. Carville
- Preceded by: William J. Cashill
- Succeeded by: Peter A. Burke

Member of the Nevada Assembly
- In office January 1941 – October 1943
- Governor: Edward P. Carville

Personal details
- Born: April 23, 1914 Carson City, Nevada, US
- Died: July 19, 1981 (aged 67) Bethesda, Maryland, US
- Resting place: Arlington National Cemetery; 38°52′50″N 77°04′30″W
- Party: Democratic
- Spouse(s): Lois Midgley Dickerson; Maxine V. Dickerson
- Children: Delcey Ann, Diane
- Education: University of Nevada
- Profession: Newspaper publisher
- Parents: Denver S. Dickerson; Una L. Reilly Dickerson

Military service
- Branch/service: United States Army
- Years of service: 1943–1945
- Rank: Technical Sergeant
- Battles/wars: World War II

Denver Dickerson (April 23, 1914 – July 19, 1981) was Speaker of the Nevada Assembly in 1943 and served in the U.S. Army during World War II. He was appointed Secretary of Guam in 1963 by U.S. President John F. Kennedy. As the office included the duties of lieutenant governor at that time, Dickerson occasionally served as the acting governor of Guam during his term.

Prior to entering politics, Dickerson worked as a journalist in Nevada and eventually became a newspaper publisher and editor. He later served as the head of the U.S. Congressional Printing Committee until his retirement in 1980.

== Biography ==
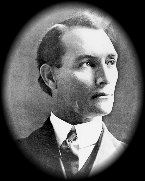
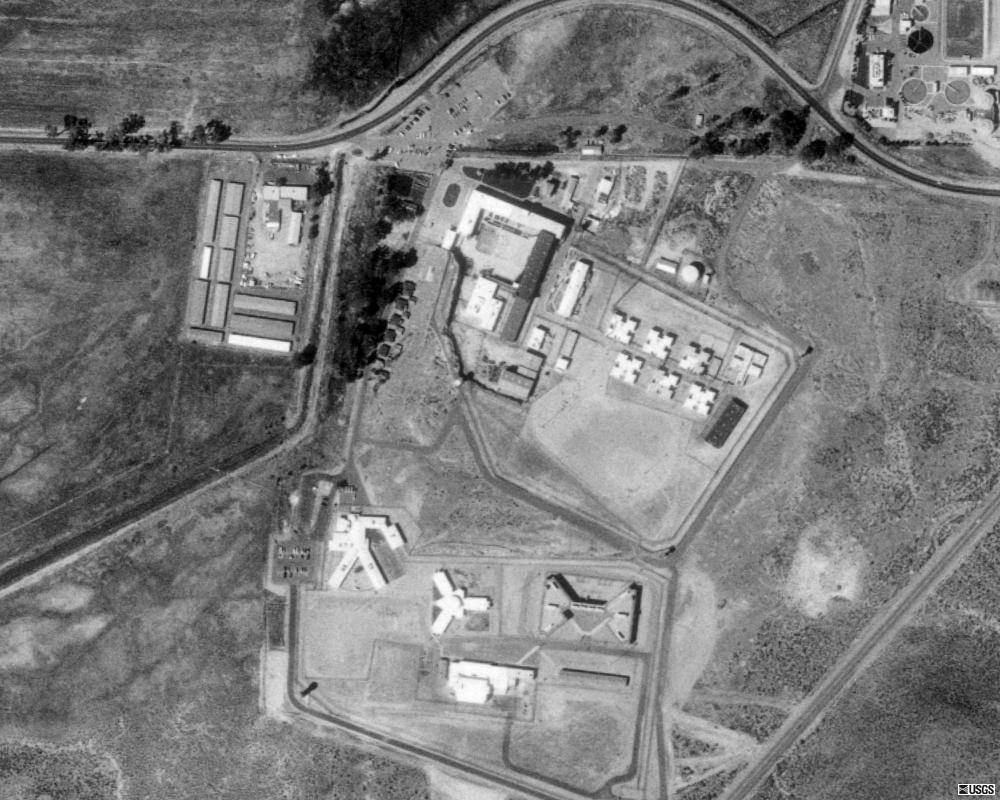
Dickerson's father was the warden of his birthplace, Nevada State Prison.

On April 23, 1914, Dickerson was born in Carson City at Nevada State Prison, where his father, Denver Sylvester Dickerson, was the warden as well as the former governor of the state. His father died in November 1925, when the younger Dickerson was 11 years old.

Dickerson attended the public school system and received his bachelor's degree from the University of Nevada. He became a journalist for the Reno Evening Gazette. Following in his father's footsteps, Dickerson eventually owned the Carson City Chronicle and the Nevada State News.

On June 24, 1938, Dickerson married Lois Midgley. They had two daughters, Delsey Ann and Diane (d. 2013).

=== Political career ===
In 1940, Dickerson ran for the Nevada Assembly from Ormsby County and was elected to the 1941 session of the state legislature. He also became the President of the Nevada Press Association in 1942. Dickerson was selected to become the Speaker of the Nevada Assembly in January 1943, at the age of 28. In October 1943, Dickerson left to serve in the U.S. Army during World War II. However, his title remained with the official records of the Nevada Assembly.

In 1947, Dickerson was appointed the head of the Nevada Department of Employment Security. In 1952, he departed for Burma as the press secretary of the U.S. embassy. Dickerson returned to Nevada in 1955 to become the editorial director of the Las Vegas Review-Journal. He returned to politics in the staff of Democratic U.S. Senator Alan Bible.

In March 1963, Dickerson was appointed the Secretary of Guam by U.S. President John F. Kennedy and was confirmed by the U.S. Senate. In his capacity as secretary, Dickerson carried out the equivalent responsibility of a lieutenant governor, intermittently filling in as acting governor throughout his term until 1969. In 1972, he joined the staff of the U.S. Senate Rules Committee and became executive officer of the Congressional Printing Committee in 1973.

Dickerson retired from the printing committee on February 29, 1980, and died in Bethesda, Maryland, on July 19, 1981. He was buried at Arlington National Cemetery on July 19 of that year.

== See also ==
- List of United States political families (Dickersons of Nevada)

| Preceded by Manuel Flores Leon Guerrero | Secretary of Guam; 1963–1969 | Succeeded by Kurt Moylan |
