= Jeanne Rowe Skinner =

American U.S. Navy officer and First Lady of Guam

First Lady of Guam
- In role September 17, 1949 – April 22, 1953
- Governor: Carlton Skinner

Personal details
- Born: April 1, 1917 Marshalltown, Iowa, US
- Died: April 19, 1988 (aged 71) Palo Alto, California, US
- Party: Democratic
- Spouse: Carlton Skinner
- Children: 3
- Occupation: U.S. Navy officer, First Lady of Guam
- Other names: Jeanne Dorothy Rowe, Jeanne Rowe, Ensign Jeanne Rowe, Jeanne R. Skinner, Jeanne Skinner
- Military career
- Allegiance: United States
- Branch: United States Navy
- Rank: Lieutenant

Jeanne Rowe Skinner (1917–1988) was an American Navy officer and former First Lady of Guam.

== Early life ==
On April 1, 1917, Skinner was born as Jeanne Dorothy Rowe in Marshalltown, Iowa. Skinner's father was George Lewis Rowe (1889–1975). Skinner's mother was Marie Henrietta (nee Franz) Rowe (1892–1977). Skinner had one sister, Virginia Robertson Rowe (1913–2009). In 1940, Skinner lived with her parents in Lancaster, Nebraska.

== Education ==
Skinner earned a degree from University of Nebraska. Skinner was a member of Kappa Kappa Gamma sorority and a member of Pi Lambda Theta honorary society.

== Career ==
Skinner served as an officer (ensign and lieutenant) in Women Accepted for Volunteer Emergency Service (WAVES), a woman's branch of the United States Navy Reserve. Skinner worked in the Public Relations division of the U.S. Navy Department in Washington, D.C. and in New York.

In 1949, when Carlton Skinner was appointed by President Harry S. Truman as the Governor of Guam, Skinner became the First Lady of Guam on September 17, 1949, until April 22, 1953.

== Personal life ==
On May 1, 1943, Skinner married Carlton Skinner at the home of Mr. & Mrs. Harvison Catlin Holland, her sister and brother-in-law, in Dayton, Ohio. They had three children, Franz, Andrea, and Barbara. They also had a Dalmatian named Lilu’okalani.

In 1943, Skinner and her husband lived in an apartment on Twentieth Street in Washington D.C. In 1949, Skinner and her family moved Guam. In the 1950s and 1960s, Skinner lived in Belvedere, California.

After Skinner's divorce, in 1967, her ex-husband married Solange Petit, a French anthropologist.

Skinner died on April 19, 1988, at the Veteran Medical Center in Palo Alto, California; she is interred at Golden Gate National Cemetery in San Bruno, California.

== See also ==
- Margaret Chung, a member of Navy's Women's Advisory Council which pushed Public Law 689
