= Governor Gilmore =

Governor Gilmore may refer to:

- Eugene Allen Gilmore (1871–1953), acting Governor-General of the Philippines in 1927 and 1929
- Jim Gilmore (born 1949), 68th Governor of Virginia
- Joseph A. Gilmore (1811–1867), 29th Governor of New Hampshire

== See also ==
- Governor Gilmer (disambiguation)
