= Roy Campbell Smith =

American naval officer (1858–1940)

Captain Roy Campbell Smith
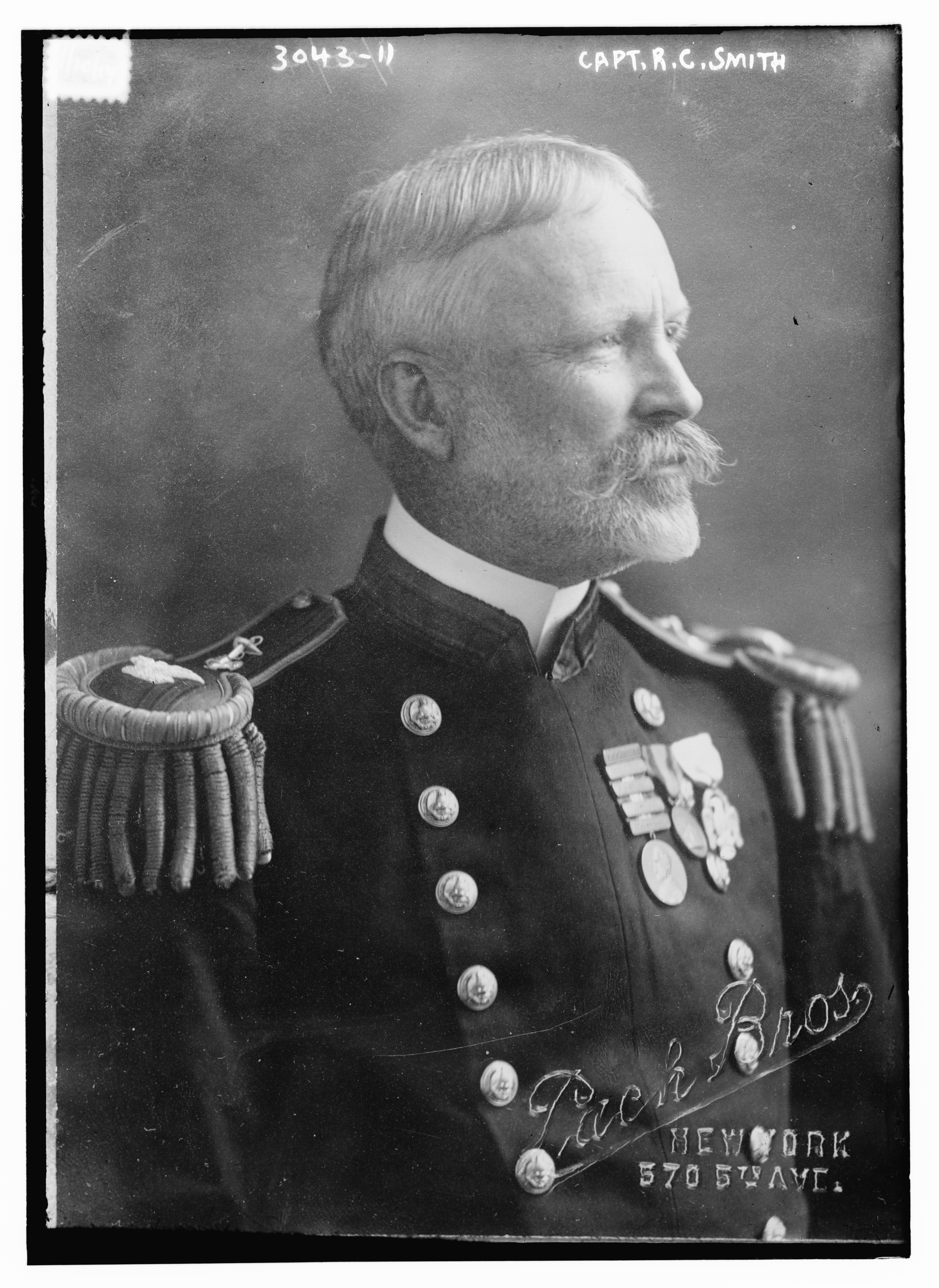

21st Naval Governor of Guam
- In office May 30, 1916 – November 18, 1918
- Preceded by: Edward Simpson (Acting)
- Succeeded by: William Gilmer

Personal details
- Born: July 16, 1858 Fort Mason, Texas, US
- Died: April 10, 1940 (aged 81) Somerville, South Carolina, US
- Spouse: Margaret Aldrich Smith
- Children: 3
- Relatives: William T. Sampson (father-in-law)
- Education: United States Naval Academy
- Occupation: Naval officer, Governor of Guam
- Military career
- Allegiance: United States of America
- Branch: United States Navy
- Rank: Captain
- Commands: USS Arkansas (BB-33)
- Conflicts: World War I
- Awards: Navy Cross

Roy Campbell Smith (1858 – April 11, 1940) was an American naval officer and the Governor of Guam from 1916 to 1918.

== Early life ==
On July 16, 1858, Smith was born in Fort Mason, Texas. Smith's father was Charles Henry Smith, an assistant surgeon general of the United States and later of the Confederate States of America. Smith's mother was Maria McGregor Campbell Smith.

== Education ==
In 1878, Smith graduated from the United States Naval Academy in Annapolis, Maryland.

== Career ==
Smith was the commanding officer of the USS Arkansas (BB-33) from 17 September 1912 to 13 October 1914.

In 1916, Smith became the Naval Governor of Guam, until 1918.

Smith retired as a U.S. Navy Captain.

== Personal life ==
On October 11, 1887, in Annapolis, Maryland, Smith married Margaret Aldrich Sampson, daughter of Rear Admiral William Thomas Sampson. They had three children, Roy, Marjorie, and William.

Smith's daughter Marjorie Sampson Smith became a sponsor of USS Sampson (DD-63) on March 4, 1916. It was named for Rear admiral William Thomas Sampson, Smith's father-in-law. In 1918, Smith's daughter Marjorie Sampson Smith married Spotswood Dandridge Bowers, a lawyer.

On May 21, 1929, Smith's wife Margaret Smith died in Newport, Rhode Island. She is interred at Lakewood Cemetery in Cooperstown, New York.

In 1912, Smith was elected as a member of the Virginia Society of the Cincinnati.

On April 10, 1940, Smith died in Summerville, South Carolina.

== Awards ==
- Navy Cross
- Sampson Medal
- Spanish Campaign Medal
- Victory Medal
