= Raymond Stone =

United states navy officer

8th Naval Governor of Guam
- In office January 28, 1904 – May 16, 1904
- Preceded by: Frank Herman Schofield
- Succeeded by: George Leland Dyer

Military service
- Allegiance: United States
- Branch/service: United States Navy
- Rank: Commander

Raymond Stone was a United States Navy officer and Governor of Guam from January 28, 1904 to May 16, 1904. He served in multiple posts in the Navy, including aboard the battleship USS Kearsarge. He was stationed in Guam in the early 1900s, where he became aide to the governor. When William Elbridge Sewell was transported back to California with an intestinal disease, Stone became acting governor. He issued a series of orders limiting drug sale on the island and forcing vendors to lower prices on food and other essential items. After George Leland Dyer became governor, Stone became a judge on the Supreme Court of Guam before returning to the mainland. He would later serve as a liaison to the United States Army, where he oversaw the transfer of Naval prisoners of war from World War I to Army control.

== Life and naval career ==
Stone was married, and had one son and daughter, Raymond and Esther. His mother and brother both lived in Point Clear, Alabama. Starting June 20, 1900, Stone served aboard the battleship USS Kearsarge. He was stationed in Guam, where he acted as acting Governor; after George Leland Dyer was given the position, Stone remained to serve as judge of the Supreme Court of Guam. As a Commander, Stone was designated a naval representative to mediate the transfer of World War I prisoners of war captured by the Navy to the authority of the United States Army, taking over the position from Lieutenant Commander Adolphus Staton.

== Governorship ==
Stone served as acting Governor of Guam from January 28, 1904 to May 16, 1904, following William Elbridge Sewell's return to California for intestinal disease treatment. He was fairly young during his term, and held the rank of Lieutenant. He grossly underestimated the native Chamorro population as lacking "ambition or the desire for change or progress." His administration sought, for its own benefit, to evolve the native economy past a personal agrarian society, and specifically wanted to utilize them for labor in military work projects. Noting the exorbitant prices that merchants were charging Guamanians for food and other necessities, Stone issued an order limiting the maximum price of most foodstuffs. He also issued orders in an attempt to regulate the Guam drug trade.
