= Ivan Wettengel =

American naval officer and politician (1876–1935)

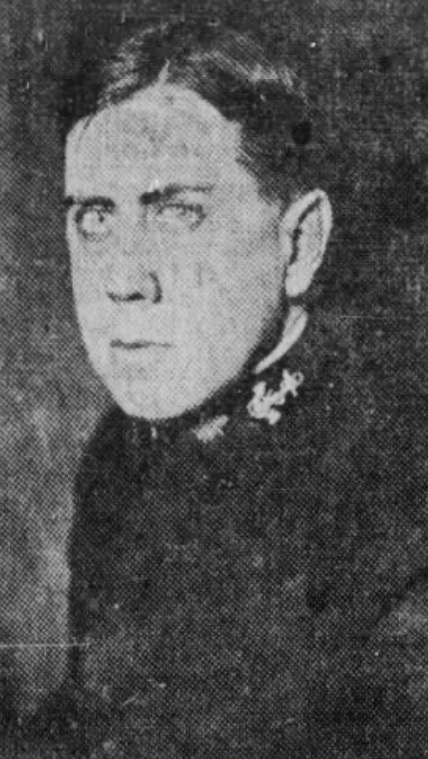
- Wettengel in 1911

25th Naval Governor of Guam
- In office July 7, 1920 – February 27, 1921
- Preceded by: William Gilmer
- Succeeded by: James Sutherland Spore

Personal details
- Born: Ivan Cyrus Wettengel; 1876 Illinois, US
- Died: February 19, 1935 (aged 58–59) San Diego, California, US
- Education: United States Naval Academy
- Awards: Navy Cross

Military service
- Allegiance: United States
- Branch/service: United States Navy
- Rank: Captain
- Commands: USS Mindoro; USS Wisconsin; USS Texas; Naval Training Station Hampton Roads
- Battles/wars: World War I

Ivan Cyrus Wettengel (1876 – February 19, 1935) was an American naval officer and politician. A United States Navy captain, he served as the 25th Naval Governor of Guam.

Born in Illinois, he served in World War I and received the Navy Cross. During his tenure as governor, he attempted to assemble a bull-mounted Guam Cavalry. A number of locations in Guam are named for him.

== Biography ==
Wettengel was born in 1876, in Illinois. At the time of his appointment to the Naval Academy he lived in Colorado.

=== Military career ===
Wettengel graduated from the United States Naval Academy in 1896. Ensign Wettengel served aboard USS Buffalo. He commanded USS Mindoro in 1900. In 1902, while a lieutenant, he saw duty aboard USS Constellation. He served aboard USS Newark in 1905 and USS Minnesota in 1906. In 1914, he served aboard USS Arkansas as a lieutenant commander. He commanded USS Wisconsin during World War I, for which he received the Navy Cross.

In 1917, Wettengel was promoted to the rank of captain. On April 12, 1918, he assumed command of the USS Montana (ACR-13).

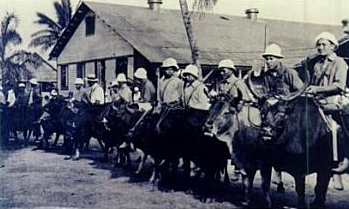
The bull-riding Guam Cavalry in 1920

Wettengel served as Naval Governor of Guam from July 7, 1920, to February 27, 1921. He overturned many of the policies of William Gilmer, the widely criticized and disliked governor prior to him. During his tenure, the Navy opened the first naval aviation station on the island, at Orote Peninsula. He attempted a military experiment during his time in office by forming the Guam Cavalry. These units rode mounted bulls but the idea was abandoned when the bulls proved untrainable. He endorsed increasing medical aid to the island in an effort to in improving the "civilizing and Americanization" of the Chamorro people by making health care and sanitation more widespread.

After serving as Governor, Wettengel commanded USS Texas from May 22, 1924, until September 28, 1925, when he became commander of Naval Training Station Hampton Roads. He retired in 1926, at the rank of captain.

== Personal life and death ==
Wettengel's first wife died on December 13, 1927, while he was stationed at the Mare Island Naval Shipyard. He then married to Janet Buchanan Wettengel. Wettengel died on February 19, 1935 in San Diego, from a muocardial infraction. According to The San Diego Sun, he was 58 years old.

A number of locations on Guam are named in Wettengel's honor. Wettengel Elementary School, opened in 1968 in Dededo, Guam, briefly held the Eloy Q. Benavente Elementary School in 2008 before protest led school officials to reaffirm its original name in honor of Wettengel.

== See also ==
- Wettengel Rugby Field, named for Wettengel
