= William Gilmer =

William Wirt Gilmer
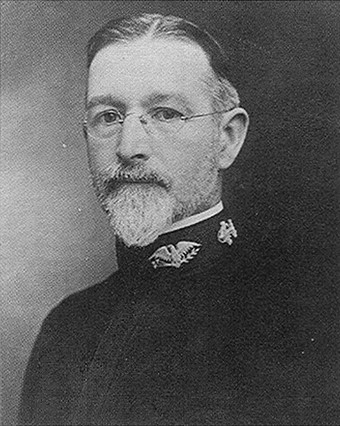

24th Naval Governor of Guam
- In office December 21, 1919 – July 7, 1920
- Preceded by: William A. Hodgman
- Succeeded by: Ivan Wettengel

22nd Naval Governor of Guam
- In office November 15, 1918 – November 22, 1919
- Preceded by: Roy Campbell Smith
- Succeeded by: William A. Hodgman

Personal details
- Born: May 21, 1863 Chatham, Virginia
- Died: January 8, 1955 (aged 91) Fletcher, North Carolina
- Education: United States Naval Academy
- Awards: Navy Cross

Military service
- Allegiance: United States
- Branch/service: United States Navy
- Rank: Captain
- Commands: USS South Carolina
- Battles/wars: World War I

William Wirt Gilmer (May 21, 1863 – January 8, 1955) was a United States Navy Captain who served as both the 22nd and 24th Naval Governor of Guam. A graduate of the United States Naval Academy, he commanded the USS South Carolina during World War I, for which he received the Navy Cross. During his two terms as governor, he proved one of the most contentious leaders in Guam's history. He exercised a large amount of control over islanders' daily lives, including banning whistling and smoking and setting up a curfew. He came into conflict with prominent Americans and Washington Naval leaders when he outlawed marriage between whites and non-whites on the island, believing the Chamorro people inferior. Eventually, concerned islanders gained the attention of Secretary of the Navy Josephus Daniels, who had Assistant Secretary of the Navy Franklin D. Roosevelt personally order the rescinding of the act. Gilmer was removed for a short time before serving a second term.

During his second term, he continued making numerous edicts, eventually equaling 50 separate orders. He required all men over sixteen to carry identification cards, partially in an effort to wipe out the Spanish naming customs of adopting both the mother's and father's name. Seen as autocratic and abusive of his power, the Navy ultimately removed him from the post in 1920. A number of geographical features in Alaska, as well as a school in North Carolina, are named after him, largely during an expedition that he took part in to explore parts of the Alaskan islands.

== Life and naval career ==
Gilmer graduated from the United States Naval Academy in 1885. As an ensign, he served aboard USS Nipsic. In 1906, he married Florence Peterson.

On 2 January 1914 he received command of USS Montana. Gilmer then commanded Twelfth Naval District at Mare Island Navy Yard, California and following the United States entry into World War I in April 1917, he assumed command of the battleship USS South Carolina, for which he received the Navy Cross. He retired with the rank of Captain after resigning his commission. Gilmer died on January 8, 1955.

== Governorship ==
Gilmer served two terms as Naval Governor of Guam. His first term lasted from November 15, 1918, to November 22, 1919. A month before he arrived, Guam experienced an outbreak of influenza, and though he set up quarantine zones upon taking command, the pandemic lasted through December, with nearly a thousand dead.

Gilmer's administration proved very controversial as he exercised a large amount of control over the activities of the island's inhabitants. He outlawed alcohol, smoking, and whistling. Further, he forbid any parties that lasted after 10 p.m. In an effort to curtail the growing rat problem, Gilmer forced all residents to either deliver the heads of five rats or a tax of twenty-five cents to the government every month.

Gilmer came into conflict with prominent American families on the island and stateside naval officials. He issued an order that forbade any white American from marrying a Chamorro or Filipino spouse, arguing such marriages created a new class that "wields a powerful influence" and caused servicemen to leave the navy and fall under the influence of native religions. A committee of forty-two prominent Guamanians signed a petition against the order, and the Legislature of Guam formally objected to the order. Gilmer attempted to justify his order to the committee in 1919 by claiming that "if a man in the United States marries a woman of any other color, he sinks immediately to the level of his wife." James H. Underwood, postmaster of the island, wrote directly to officials in Washington, D.C. to protest the move, as many Americans had already married Chamorros. He eventually obtained a meeting with the Chief of Naval Operations, former Guam governor Robert Coontz, and soon after Franklin D. Roosevelt, then Assistant Secretary of the Navy, personally wrote to Gilmer and ordered the law revoked, allowing whites to again marry Chamorros and Filipinos. He was relieved of duty soon after the incident.

Gilmer returned for a second from December 21, 1919, to July 7, 1920. In March 1920, Gilmer began requiring that all men sixteen and older obtain a cèdula personal, essentially an identification document issued by the government. These documents were used to interact with the government during matters like tax payment, land transfers, birth certification, and anything in the court system. At the same time, these documents were meant to discourage the Guamanian practice of using Spanish naming customs, in which a person used the father's last name, followed by the mother's maiden name, and forced the western custom of using the father's name as the last name upon the people.

Throughout his two terms, he issued over 50 orders, many of them later viewed as autocratic, and increased the use of the death penalty exponentially, which had only been used once before during America's occupation of the island before him.

Eventually, Gilmer was removed from office after many of his orders were seen as abuses of power and embarrassing to the Navy. After his removal from his post, Gilmer resigned his Navy commission.

== Legacy ==
In Fletcher, North Carolina, a parochial elementary school administered by the Seventh-day Adventist Church, Captain Gilmer School is named after him. The school's name was changed to "Captain Gilmer School" in 1950 after Gilmer gave $2000 for the construction of an additional classroom and two bathrooms. Gilmer was baptized as a Seventh-day Adventist in 1935 and attended the nearby Hendersonville church.

Gilmer Bay on the western shore of Kruzof Island was named after him in 1897, while he was a lieutenant. As an ensign, he served in an exploration party, during which Gilmore Cove on Partofshikof Island was named after him.
