= Pacific Daily News =

Newspaper based in Hagåtña, Guam

- Type: Online newspaper
- Format: E-Newspaper
- Owner: Kaleo Moylan
- Publisher: Jae James
- Editor: Haidee Gilbert
- Founded: 1950
- Language: English
- Headquarters: Hagåtña, Guam, United States
- Circulation: 275,000 unique visitors average monthly
- OCLC number: 55506584
- Website: guampdn.com

The Pacific Daily News, formerly Guam Daily News, is an online newspaper based in Hagåtña, in the United States territory of Guam. It is owned by Kaleo Moylan.

== History ==
Guam Daily News began as a newspaper of the United States Navy, published under various titles. Joseph Flores, later the Governor of Guam, bought the newspaper in 1950.

In 1970, a group of purchasers headed by the Honolulu Star-Bulletin acquired the Guam Daily News for an undisclosed price. The paper was renamed the Pacific Daily News the same year. The Pacific Daily News was acquired by the Gannett Company in 1971, along with several other newspapers owned by Star-Bulletin.

Pacific Daily News's parent company published two weekly newspapers for U.S. military personnel on Guam for a period of time – The Navigator and The Pacific Edge – but these ceased publication as of 2009.

In February 2021, former lieutenant governor, senator and local businessman Kaleo Moylan purchased the Pacific Daily News from subsidiaries of the Gannett Company. Moylan's acquisition of the Pacific Daily News returned the media company to local ownership after 50 years of ownership by Gannett.

The newspaper suspended its Saturday and Sunday editions in January 2023. Its final print edition was published on March 31, 2023. From now on, the publication will be online only.

== Contents ==
The Pacific Daily News ("PDN" as nicknamed by locals) offers readers the latest local headlines and stories covering Guam, Micronesia and the Pacific Rim region, along with breaking news from the United States and the world. Most of what the PDN covers usually involves political matters and issues affecting those living on Guam.

In addition, the PDN also features a weekly entertainment section published each Friday called "GuamPika", which is geared towards visitors to the island.

It is one of two newspapers on Guam, the other being The Guam Daily Post. The Marianas Variety, out of Saipan, offers competition in the Commonwealth of the Northern Mariana Islands.
