= Benjamin McCandlish =

36th Naval Governor of Guam

Commodore Benjamin McCandlish

36th Naval Governor of Guam
- In office March 27, 1936 – February 8, 1938
- Preceded by: George A. Alexander
- Succeeded by: James Thomas Alexander

Personal details
- Born: Benjamin Vaughan McCandlish; June 3, 1886 Petersburg, Virginia, US
- Died: October 16, 1975 (aged 89) Darlington, South Carolina, US
- Resting place: Blandford Cemetery, Petersburg, Virginia, US
- Spouse(s): Margherita Wood McCandlish, Louise Sligh Brown
- Military career
- Allegiance: United States
- Branch: United States Navy
- Rank: U.S. Navy Commodore
- Conflicts: World War I World War II
- Awards: Navy Cross, Legion of Merit

Benjamin Vaughan McCandlish (June 3, 1886 – October 16, 1975) was a United States Navy flag officer who served as the 36th Naval Governor of Guam and was a recipient of the Navy Cross.

== Early life and education ==
On June 3, 1886, McCandlish was born in Petersburg, Virginia. In 1909, McCandlish earned a degree from the United States Naval Academy in 1909.

== Career ==
=== Naval service ===
As an ensign, McCandlish served aboard USS New York, an armored cruiser that was renamed USS Saratoga in 1911.

During World War I, on August 25, 1918, McCandlish commanded USS Davis, a Sampson-class destroyer, during its mission to escort troops to Europe through waters infested by German U-boats, until August 6, 1919. For his actions, he received the Navy Cross as a lieutenant commander. McCandlish commanded a number of different-class vessels during the 1920s and 1930s until 12 August 1938, when he assumed his last seagoing command. On August 12, 1938, McCandlish became the first captain of USS Boise, a Brooklyn-class cruiser. In February 1939, following a shakedown cruise to Monrovia, Liberia; and Cape Town, Union of South Africa, McCandlish's Boise joined Division 9, Cruisers, Battle Force, at San Pedro, California. On December 4, 1941, Boise arrived at Manila, Philippine Islands.

=== Governor of Guam ===
McCandlish served as Naval Governor of Guam from March 27, 1936, to February 8, 1938. Along with others in the U.S. Naval Command, he placed emphasis on basic hygiene education for the island's children, often in a dictatorial manner resented by some Chamorro. He discouraged a mission of the Guam Congress to the federal government, instead instructing them to look toward the numerous welfare agencies he had set up on the island. The Congress sent the mission regardless, and ceased to accept funds from the Navy.

=== World War II service ===
In 1940, prior to World War II, Capt. McCandlish was selected to serve as Captain of the Norfolk Navy Yard in Portsmouth, Virginia, was promoted to flag rank as Commodore (pay grade 0-7) in April 1943, and commanded the Moroccan Sea Frontier from October 13, 1943, to August 1, 1945.

== Personal life ==
On June 12, 1914, in Manila, Philippine Islands, McCandlish married Margarita Wilson Wood.

On August 25, 1954, McCandlish's wife Margherita Wood McCandlish died in a hospital in Hartsville, South Carolina. McCandlish is interred at Blandford Cemetery in Petersburg, Virginia.

In Darlington, South Carolina, McCandlish married Louise Sligh Brown (Maiden, 1904–1988), former wife of Gustave Waldeck Sligh He retired as a commodore, settled in Darlington, became a well-known society figure.

On 16 October 1975, McCandlish died in Darlington, South Carolina. McCandlish is interred at Blandford Cemetery in Petersburg, Virginia.

McCandlish's sister Elsie Gray McCandlish married F.A. Miller.

== Awards ==
- Navy Cross
- Legion of Merit

=== Navy Cross Citation ===
"The President of the United States of America takes pleasure in presenting the Navy Cross to Lieutenant Commander Benjamin Vaughan McCandlish, United States Navy, for distinguished service in the line of his profession as Commanding Officer of the U.S.S. DAVIS. engaged in the important, exacting, and hazardous duty of patrolling the waters infested with enemy submarines and mines, in escorting and protecting vitally important convoys of troops, and supplies through these waters, and in offensive and defensive action, vigorously and unremittingly prosecuted against all forms of enemy naval activity during World War I."

Military offices
Preceded by George A. Alexander	Naval Governor of Guam; 1936–1938	Succeeded by James Thomas Alexander
