= Anita M. Elvidge =

American artist and First Lady of Guam

First Lady of Guam
- In role April 23, 1953 – May 19, 1956
- Governor: Ford Quint Elvidge

Personal details
- Born: 1895 Oakland, California
- Died: 1981 (aged 85–86) Seattle, Washington
- Party: Republican
- Spouse: Ford Quint Elvidge
- Children: 3
- Occupation: Artist, First Lady of Guam
- Other names: Anita Emily Miller, Anita Miller Elvidge, Anita Elvidge, Nita Elvidge.

Anita M. Elvidge (1895 — 16 March 1981) was an American artist and former First Lady of Guam.

== Early life ==
Elvidge was born in Oakland, California, in 1895.

== Education ==
Elvidge attended California College of Arts and Crafts and later the University of Washington in Seattle, Washington.

== Career ==
Elvidge was an artist. In 1952, Elvidge's art works of Landscapes in Watercolor works on display in the Frye Museum in Washington. Elvidge's art works were also on display in the Seattle Art Museum.

In 1956, when Ford Quint Elvidge was appointed by President Dwight D. Eisenhower as the Governor of Guam, Elvidge became the First Lady of Guam on April 23, 1953, until May 19, 1956. In Guam, Elvidge was in charge of the Governor's House, where she resided with her husband, a Guamanian servant, and a Chinese cook.

In 1972, Elvidge wrote Guam Interlude, a book about her experience in Guam.

== Works ==
- Stranded. A reproduction of a painting in watercolor.
- Thanksgiving Sale, Pacific Coast China Co. Tempera on paper.

== Personal life ==
Elvidge's husband was Ford Quint Elvidge, an American attorney and former Governor of Guam. They have three children, Marthanna, Robert, and Carolyn. Elvidge and her family lived in Seattle, Washington and Guam.

Elvidge's daughter Marthanna Elvidge Veblen (1920-2015) became a librarian and an author in Washington.

Elvidge's son Robert Fred Elvidge (1925-2019) became a businessman in Washington. He was an owner and operator of businesses in bookkeeping, tax preparation, carpet cleaning, and janitorial services in Washington.

On 16 March 1981, Elvidge died in Seattle, Washington.
