= Virgin Islands Company =

Government House rum, produced by the VIC.

The Virgin Islands Company (VIC) was a New Deal program, created in 1934 with $1 million in start-up funding from the Public Works Administration (PWA). The goal of the VIC was to revive the Virgin Islands’ sugar and rum industries, which had been decimated by Prohibition and the Great Depression. Except during periods of drought and war, the VIC was successful in boosting the economy and relieving unemployment. In 1936, for example, the governor of the Virgin Islands reported the following: "While furnishing relief employment to the great majority of unemployed workers of the island, the company has accumulated large inventories of growing sugar cane and a large supply of rum of the finest quality. It has rehabilitated fields and factories. It is providing adequate and comfortable housing for its laborers. It has increased labor wages by 50 percent since its inception." For many years, the VIC was an important part of the Virgin Islands economy. It was terminated in 1965.
