= Alfred Walton Hinds =

17th Naval Governor of Guam

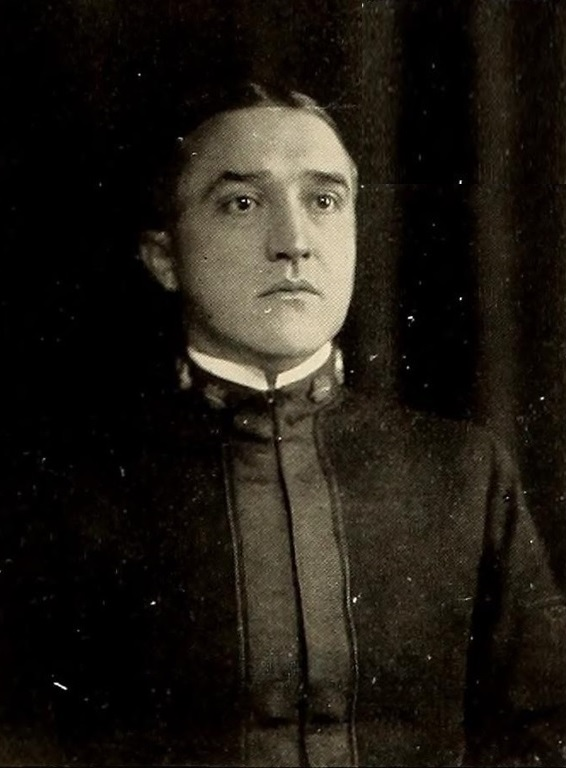
- Alfred Hinds as a lieutenant commander. From 1912's Lucky Bag, the Naval Academy yearbook.

17th Naval Governor of Guam
- In office September 23, 1913 – March 28, 1914
- Preceded by: Robert Coontz
- Succeeded by: William John Maxwell

Personal details
- Born: July 25, 1874 Marshall County, Alabama
- Died: December 25, 1957 (aged 83) San Diego, California
- Resting place: Fort Rosecrans National Cemetery
- Spouse: Mary Beardslee Hinds
- Children: 1
- Occupation: Naval officer, Governor of Guam

Military service
- Allegiance: United States
- Branch/service: United States Navy
- Years of service: 1894-1927
- Rank: Captain (Active duty); Rear Admiral (Retired list)
- Commands: Department of Marine Engineering and Naval Construction at the United States Naval Academy; USS Rochester; USS New York; Panama Canal
- Battles/wars: World War I

Alfred Walton Hinds (July 25, 1874 – December 25, 1957) was a United States Navy captain who served as the 17th Naval Governor of Guam. His early naval service included serving as Assistant Engineer aboard USS Texas, the United States Navy's first battleship, where he was reprimanded for an accident aboard in 1896. In 1911, Hinds joined the staff of the United States Naval Academy, heading the Department of Marine Engineering and Naval Construction, writing a textbook on the subject while there.

From September 23, 1913, to March 28, 1914, Hinds served as acting Governor of Guam. Having already helped form the policies of the previous governor, Hinds continued much of the practices of the earlier administration. He successfully drew new import and export businesses to the island, though he failed in his attempts to further development of Guam as a key naval outpost. Following his governorship, Hinds commanded various ships and eventually became marine superintendent of the Panama Canal in 1924, serving in that office until early 1925.

== Life ==
Hinds was born on July 25, 1874, in Marshall County, Alabama, the son of Margaret Rebecca (Pickett) Hinds and Byram Wilborn Hinds. His father was a physician and had served as a lieutenant in the Confederate States Army during the American Civil War. Among his siblings was Ernest Hinds, a U.S. Army major general.

He was a member of the New York Yacht Club.

== Naval career ==
Hinds graduated from the United States Naval Academy in 1894. He served as Assistant Engineer aboard USS Texas, the first battleship commissioned by the United States Navy. The Navy publicly reprimanded him for his role in an accident aboard the vessel in September 1896. In 1901, he served temporarily aboard USS Wabash. In 1908, as a lieutenant commander, the Navy ordered him aboard USS Virginia.

In 1911, Hinds headed the Department of Marine Engineering and Naval Construction at the United States Naval Academy. There, he also co-authored the book Marine and Naval Boilers with Lieutenant Commander Frank Lyon. The book served as a textbook for midshipmen at the Naval Academy. In 1917, as a commander, he served as executive officer of USS Oklahoma. In 1918, he was given command of USS Rochester. During his command, the ship came to the aid of the British steamer Atlantian. Though Hinds ordered the engagement of the U-boat that had attacked the ship, but the crew proved unable to find it. He was placed in command of USS New York in 1922. In 1924, Hinds became marine superintendent of the Panama Canal, keeping that position until February 23, 1925.

== Governorship ==
Hinds served as acting Naval Governor of Guam from September 23, 1913, to March 28, 1914. Prior to becoming governor, Hinds served as public works officer for the island under Governor Robert Coontz, and continued much of the same policies he advocated in the position after taking the governorship. Hinds expressed fear that the large numbers of Japanese tourists to the island performing espionage. He also raised concerns about occupations of the surrounding islands by Japan. He successfully drew new American importers and exporters to the island, including San Francisco company Atkins, Kroll & Company.

As governor, Hinds strongly promoted the utilization of Guam as an area for key naval bases to be built upon. He advocated for construction of a base to commence quickly using improvised dredging equipment from the Panama Canal. However, various engineers and the Chief of the Bureau of Yards and Docks dismissed the proposal as both unorthodox and originating from the wrong office. Hinds viewed Guam as of little importance other than as a naval outpost, stating in 1915 that "Except as a naval base-a place from which to sail forth to 'capture or destroy the enemy fleet'-Guam has no value to the navy and is, perhaps, of but little interest to naval officers."

== Published works ==
- Hinds, Alfred (October 15, 1921). "Changes in the Naval Station of the Pacific Due to the World War". Army and Navy Journal. 59 (149).
- Lyon, Frank; Alfred Hinds (1912). Marine and Naval Boilers. Annapolis, Maryland: United States Naval Institute. p. 454.
- Hinds, Alfred (1921). "Sea Power and Disarmament". North American Review. 214: 588–593.

== Personal life ==
On April 10, 1902, Hinds married Mary Beardslee (1874-1952) at May Memorial Church in Syracuse, New York. They had one son, Walton Beardslee Hinds (1904-1973).

In 1931, Hinds and his family moved to Coronado, California.

Hinds died on December 25, 1957.
