= Marianas Variety =

Daily newspaper in Saipan, Northern Mariana Islands

Marianas Variety News & Views
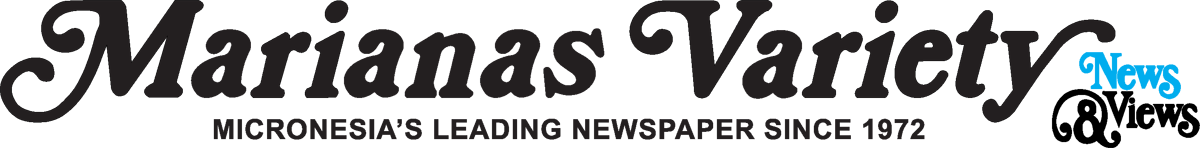
- Type: Daily newspaper
- Owner: Younis Art Studio Inc.
- Publisher: Abed Younis
- Editor: Zaldy Dandan
- Founded: 1972
- Headquarters: Saipan, Northern Mariana Islands
- Website: mvariety.com

Marianas Variety is a daily newspaper published in Saipan, Northern Mariana Islands, five times per week. It is owned by Younis Art Studio Inc. Marianas Variety is a member of the Associated Press, Reuters, and the Pacific Islands News Association.

== Publication ==
Established on March 16, 1972, Marianas Variety News & Views today has a readership of 40,000 in the Northern Mariana Islands and 2,000 elsewhere in Micronesia. It had a sister publication: the Palau Horizon in Palau, which had a readership of 8,000, launched in 1998. Former sister publication Variety on Guam was sold in 2015 and is now the Guam Daily Post.

Variety prints an average of 24-40 pages daily with full color capability and is distributed in the Northern Mariana Islands, Guam, Palau, and the Federated States of Micronesia. It has subscribers throughout the South Pacific, the Philippines, Hawaii, Japan and the mainland United States.

== History ==
In 2003, the United States Environmental Protection Agency gave an Environmental Achievement Award to Marianas Variety News & Views for "producing consistent, extensive, fearless and unbiased news coverage focusing on the causes, resolutions and preventions of environmental issues — including the contamination of soil, groundwater, drinking water, seawater and air — along with their effects to human health and safety." The newspaper has also received awards from the local chapter of the Society of Professional Journalists.

== Defamation lawsuit ==
In 2001, the Northern Mariana Islands (CNMI) held a gubernatorial election in which Covenant Party politician Benigno Fitial, then the Speaker of the CNMI House of Representatives, was a contender. On October 19, 2001, Rep. Stanley Torres wrote a letter insinuating that Fitial had accepted a $100,000 bribe from businessman Willie Tan. Three days later, Variety ran a front-page article headlined, "Torres accuses Fitial of accepting bribe," with the caption "Fitial calls allegation 'absurd.'" On October 25, Torres ran a paid political advertisement in Variety which reprinted the full letter and added, "I don’t hide behind legislative shield to tell LIES. I don’t go to daily Mass and receive Holy Communion and tell LIES." Abed Younis, the newspaper's owner, approved the advertisement for publication. The newspaper also published paid advertisements from Torres vehemently refusing to retract his allegations. Fitial lost the election.

In March 2003, Fitial and Tan filed a defamation lawsuit against the Variety for printing the advertisements. Their argument was based largely upon Younis's personal dislike of Tan, who was a partial owner of a rival newspaper, the Saipan Tribune, and upon the Variety's failure to investigate Torres's claims further than the original article before printing the advertisements.

The trial court granted summary judgement in favor of the newspaper; this was affirmed by the Northern Mariana Islands Supreme Court, which cited The New York Times Company v. Sullivan and determined that Younis Art Studio was not liable for defamation under the actual malice test. The decision stated that there was no evidence that Variety had knowingly printed false information, nor was there evidence that Variety had acted with a reckless disregard for the advertisements' truthfulness. The court ruled that Younis's dislike for Tan was immaterial to the case, as it had no bearing on the determination of actual malice, and that the newspaper did not have to investigate the truthfulness of the advertisements absent serious doubts regarding them. The court also rejected the claim that Tan's financial interest in the Tribune played into Variety's actions, noting that there was no evidence of any such profiteering scheme.

== Awards ==
- Best Newspaper, awarded by the Society of Professional Journalists-NMI chapter in 1995
- Best Editorial Writing, SPJ-NMI, 1995
- Best News Photography, SPJ-NMI, 1995
- NMI Humanities Award for Outstanding Contributions to Journalism, 2001
- Best Online Edition of a Pacific Island Newspaper, 2002
- Environmental Achievement Award, U.S. Environmental Protection Agency, 2003
