= Guam Organic Act of 1950 =

1950 United States federal law

Organic Act of Guam
- Long title: An Act to provide a civil government for Guam, and for other purposes.
- Enacted by: the 81st United States Congress

Citations
- Public law: Pub. L. 81–630
- Statutes at Large: 64 Stat. 384

Codification
- U.S.C. sections created: 48 U.S.C. ch. 8A § 1421 et seq.

Legislative history
- Signed into law by President Harry S. Truman on August 1, 1950

The Guam Organic Act of 1950 (formally the Organic Act of Guam), (48 U.S.C. § 1421 et seq., Pub. L. 81–630, H.R. 7273, 64 Stat. 384, enacted August 1, 1950) is a United States federal law that redesignated the island of Guam as an unincorporated territory of the United States, established executive, legislative, and judicial branches, and transferred federal jurisdiction from the United States Navy to the United States Department of the Interior. For the first time in over three hundred years of foreign colonization, the people of Guam had some measure of self-governance, however limited. Before that time there was some participation in the Local Administration, through the mayors or "gobernadorcillos" in Spanish times, who acted under the supervision of the Governor of the Mariana Islands.

== Provisions ==
The Organic Act (as it became known on Guam) provided for:

1. the Governor of Guam – an executive branch headed by a governor appointed by the President of the United States. It was not until the Elective Governor Act of 1968 that the residents of Guam were given the right to vote for their own governor;
2. the Guam Legislature – a unicameral (single-body) legislature of up to 21 members (which was reduced to 15 members in 1996), elected by the residents of Guam. This was the first time Guam residents were given the right to vote for the body that created the laws that governed them, for the most part. The ultimate laws that govern Guam are still those of the U.S. Congress, a body in which Guam residents still have no vote;
3. the Judiciary of Guam – a court system with judges appointed by the Governor of Guam and re-elected by Guam voters;
4. United States citizenship for the residents of Guam. Prior to this, Guam residents were non-citizen US nationals, except those who were naturalized in the U.S. mainland or who had served in the U.S. military; and
5. a limited Bill of Rights.

Guam was later granted a non-voting delegate to the U.S. House of Representatives. The Guam delegate is an official part of Congress, and can serve on committees, but cannot vote on legislation. See: Delegate (United States Congress)

The first bill providing for an Organic Act and U.S. citizenship was introduced on July 15, 1946, by U.S. Representative Robert A. Grant of Indiana in the form of H.R. 7044. This provided that Guam is accorded the semi-autonomous status of an organized territory, with the privilege of sending a delegate to the U.S. House of Representatives. The bill, however, was never even reported out of committee, as was the fate of all the bills introduced during the 79th United States Congress.

== Guam Assembly "walkout" ==
The issue of local authority came to a head in February 1949, when Abe Goldstein, a civil service employee of the U.S. Navy, was subpoenaed by the Guam Assembly. Goldstein allegedly was one of a number of people in violation of a prohibition against Americans owning local businesses. Goldstein and others were accused of using Guamanian "front men" to finance the local businesses. Goldstein, however, refused to testify, having received unofficial support from Naval Governor Charles Alan Pownall (1946–1949). Pownall had vetoed the power of the Guam Assembly to subpoena Americans in October 1948.

When Goldstein refused to testify, the Guam Assembly declared him guilty of contempt and issued a warrant for his arrest. Governor Pownall then intervened and halted execution of the warrant by the Guam Police Department. Angered and frustrated by what they saw as a lack of respect and authority, the Guam Assembly walked out en masse on March 6, 1949. Governor Pownall ordered them to return, but when the assemblymen refused, he dismissed them.

This dramatic encounter received international attention and widespread publicity (through the help of Assemblyman Carlos P. Taitano) that generated a great deal of support for self-government and U.S. citizenship for the people of Guam. Though the Assemblymen were later reinstated by Governor Pownall, U.S. citizenship and some form of self-government had already become a foregone conclusion.

== President Truman's intervention ==
To pacify the island until the U.S. Congress could pass an Organic Act, U.S. President Harry S. Truman, issued Executive Order No. 10077 on September 7, 1949, which stipulated that:

- The administration of the island of Guam is hereby transferred from the Secretary of the Navy to the Secretary of the Interior, effective on July 1, 1950 (later amended to August 1, 1950, by Executive Order No. 10137).
- The Department of the Navy and the Department of the Interior shall proceed with plans for transfer of administration of the island of Guam as explained in the above-mentioned memorandum of understanding.
- When the transfer of administration made by this order becomes effective, the Secretary of the Interior shall take such action as may be necessary and appropriate, and in harmony with applicable law, for the administration of civil government in the island of Guam.
- The executive departments and agencies of the government are authorized and directed to cooperate with the Departments of the Navy and Interior in the effectuation of the provisions of this order.
- The said Executive Order No. 108-A of December 23, 1898, is revoked, effective July 1, 1950 (later amended to August 1, 1950, by Executive Order No. 10137).
- "The people of Guam were afforded the opportunity to set and administer policy and laws for the island of Guam."

In accordance with this order, Carlton Skinner, a public relations officer in the Department of Interior, was selected by Interior, nominated by the Navy, and then appointed by President Truman to serve as Guam's first civilian Governor. He took the oath of office on September 17, 1949.

On October 3, 1949, the House Public Lands Committee reported that H.R. 4499, containing provisions that later became known as the Organic Act of Guam, would be enacted. Guam, as an unincorporated territory, was also granted, among other things, some leeway in establishing its judicial branch.

== Organic Act of Guam ==
The Organic Act of Guam can be accessed in portable document format at https://www.govinfo.gov/content/pkg/COMPS-1142/pdf/COMPS-1142.pdf.
