= Ford Quint Elvidge =

2nd Civilian Governor of Guam

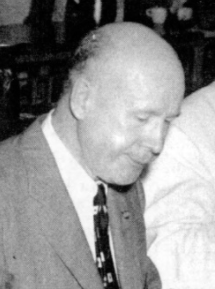

2nd Governor of Guam
- In office April 23, 1953 – May 19, 1956
- Appointed by: Dwight D. Eisenhower
- Preceded by: Carlton Skinner; Randall S. Herman (acting)
- Succeeded by: William Corbett (acting); Richard Barrett Lowe

Personal details
- Born: November 30, 1892 Oakland, California, U.S.
- Died: July 14, 1980 (aged 87) Seattle, Washington, U.S.
- Party: Republican
- Spouse: Anita M. Elvidge
- Occupation: Lawyer, governor of Guam

Ford Quint Elvidge (November 30, 1892 – July 14, 1980) was an American attorney who was governor of Guam from 1953 to 1956.

== Early life and education ==
Ford Quint Elvidge was born in Oakland, California, on November 30, 1892. His family moved to Vancouver, Canada, in 1911. He entered the University of Washington School of Law in 1916. During World War I Elvidge served in the United States Army Medical Corps. He did not see any fighting in the war and only reached Camp Mills before the armistice.

Elvidge was admitted to the Washington State Bar Association in 1919, and starting practicing law in Seattle. He was a member of the Elvidge, Beblen, Tewell, Bergman and Taylor law firm until his retirement in 1974. Queen Elizabeth II awarded him the Order of the British Empire in 1966, due to his legal service to the British consular agency in Seattle. He was president of the Seattle Bar Association.

== Governor of Guam ==
In the 1952 election Elvidge unsuccessfully sought the Republican nomination for Lieutenant Governor of Washington. President Dwight D. Eisenhower appointed Elvidge to replace Carlton Skinner as governor of Guam. Elvidge knew little about Guam at the time of his appointment. His lieutenant governor was Randall Herman, who also served under Skinner.

All forms of gambling were prohibited at the Liberation Day festival during Elvidge's tenure. Taxi dancers were banned by a law he signed in 1954. A cleanup campaign of dumped military surplus and abandoned vehicles was conducted. He negotiated an increase to power and water allocations to Guam's population from the United States Navy. He was the first governor of Guam to live at the Governor House.

Richard Barrett Lowe was selected to succeed Elvidge as governor in 1956. Elvidge published Guam Interlude, a book about his life on Guam, in 1972.

== Personal life ==
Elvidge married Anita Emily Miller, with whom he had three children, in 1918. Elvidge died in Seattle, Washington, on July 14, 1980.

== Works cited ==
=== News ===
- Naputi, Suzanne (August 2, 1980). "Former governor dies". Pacific Daily News. p. 5 – via Newspapers.com.
- Perez, Rob (October 12, 1980). "only yesterday". Pacific Daily News. p. 2 – via Newspapers.com.

=== Web ===
- Tolentino, Dominica. "Governor Ford Quint Elvidge". Guampedia. Archived from the original on June 21, 2025.

Government offices
Preceded by Carlton Skinner	Governor of Guam; 1953–1956	Succeeded by William Corbett (acting)
