= Joseph Flores (Guamanian politician) =

Guamanian newspaper publisher and politician

Joseph F. Flores

4th Appointed Governor of Guam
- In office July 9, 1960 – May 20, 1961
- Appointed by: Dwight D. Eisenhower
- Preceded by: Richard Barrett Lowe; Marcellus Boss (acting)
- Succeeded by: Bill Daniel

Personal details
- Born: August 12, 1900 Hagåtña, Guam
- Died: December 18, 1981 (aged 81) Agana, Guam
- Party: Republican
- Spouse: Angela Perez Flores
- Children: 1

Military service
- Allegiance: United States
- Branch/service: United States Navy

Joseph F. Flores (August 12, 1900 – December 18, 1981) was a Guamanian newspaper publisher and politician. Flores was the fourth civilian appointed Governor of Guam, and was the first Chamorro to hold the office. He also founded the island's first locally owned newspaper, the Guam Daily News (later becoming the Pacific Daily News), which was the only local newspaper until 1966. He enjoyed success running many publications before being appointed Governor by President Dwight D. Eisenhower in 1960. As Governor, Flores pushed for increased self-governance in Guam, resigning in 1961. After his Governorship, Flores founded other businesses and became involved in numerous community organizations. He was a Knight of St. Sylvester.

== Life and career ==
=== Early life ===
Flores was born on August 12, 1900, in Hagåtña, Guam, and received all of his education on the island. As a teenager, Flores worked for the United States Navy government in Guam as a messenger, and an operator at the Naval cable station. During World War I, Flores enlisted in the navy, though he never saw combat. After leaving the navy, Flores moved to San Francisco and married his wife Angela.

=== Publishing career ===
While in San Francisco, Flores opened a small print shop and began printing a four-page weekly newspaper, the South of the Market Street Tribune. The South of the Market Tribune turned a good profit until the Great Depression and a printing worker's strike forced it out of business. However, by the end of World War II, Flores ran and published five newspapers.

Flores returned to Guam in 1947 to partner with his brothers Joaquin and Jesus Flores in an import company called Flores Brothers in Hagåtña. Upon his return, he purchased the Naval newspaper publication Guam News for $37,000 in 1950, renaming it the Guam Daily News and making Flores the first local newspaper publisher in Guam. Later, Flores began publishing the Territorial Sun, a Sunday newspaper, and continued publishing for twenty years, when he sold the Guam Daily News to Chin Ho for $1.2 million, who later sold it to Gannett Company.

=== Personal life ===
Flores was married to Angela Perez Flores and had one child named Edward.

== Governorship ==
President Eisenhower appointed Flores Governor of Guam in 1960, making Flores the first locally born Chamorro to hold the office. His nomination followed the resignations of Richard Barrett Lowe and the subsequent acting governor Marcellus Boss. During his governorship, Flores pushed for Guamanian self-governance and a Delegate from Guam to the United States, and opened public health centers in various locations. In addition, he aided in making the University of Guam a land-grant university. When John F. Kennedy, a Democrat, became president, Flores resigned on May 20, 1961, as a courtesy, after only one year in office.

== Post-governorship ==
After leaving office, Flores founded a number of companies, including the Guam Savings and Loan Association in 1954, now named BankPacific and run by his grandson Phillip Flores, Mariannas Finance Corporation, Pacific American Insurance Company, and Guam Air Lines, and owned a number of office buildings and apartment buildings. In addition to his entrepreneurial work, Flores served on a number of boards, including chairing the University of Guam Board of Regents and the Territorial Planning Commission, and a member of the Guam Chamber of Commerce, Young Men's League of Guam, and the Elks Club. He died on December 18, 1981, by his long illness at the age of 81.

== Awards and legacy ==
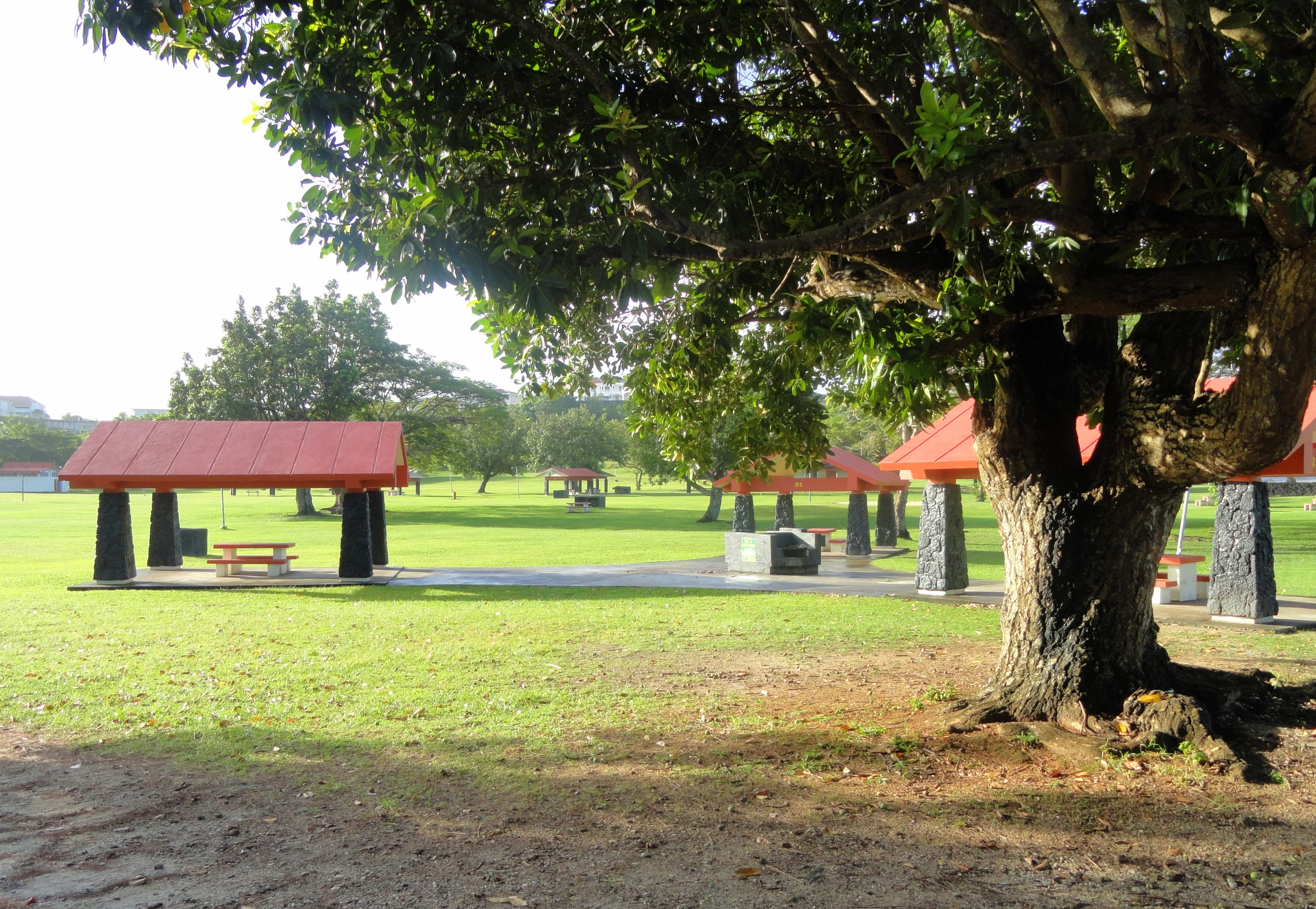
Governor Joseph Flores Beach Park

Flores was a Knight of St. Sylvester and was inducted into the Guam Chamber of Commerce Hall of Fame in 1992. In the 1960s, Governor Joseph F. Flores Beach Park was named in his honor.

== Additional sources ==
- Babauta, Leo, Joseph Flores, Guampedia
- Cunningham, Lawrence; Janice Beaty (2001). A History of Guam (illustrated ed.). Bess Press. ISBN 1-57306-047-X.
- "President Names Flores New Governor of Guam". The Virgin Islands Daily News. 15 June 1960.
- Rogers, Robert (1995). Destiny's Landfall: A History of Guam (illustrated ed.). University of Hawaii Press. ISBN 0-8248-1678-1.
- Wuerch, William; Dirk Anthony Ballendorf (1994). Historical Dictionary of Guam and Micronesia. Lanham, Maryland: Rowman & Littlefield. ISBN 0-8108-2858-8.

Government offices
Preceded by Marcellus Boss (Acting)	Governor of Guam; 1960–1961	Succeeded by Bill Daniel
