= Charles Alan Pownall =

US Navy officer and Governor of Guam

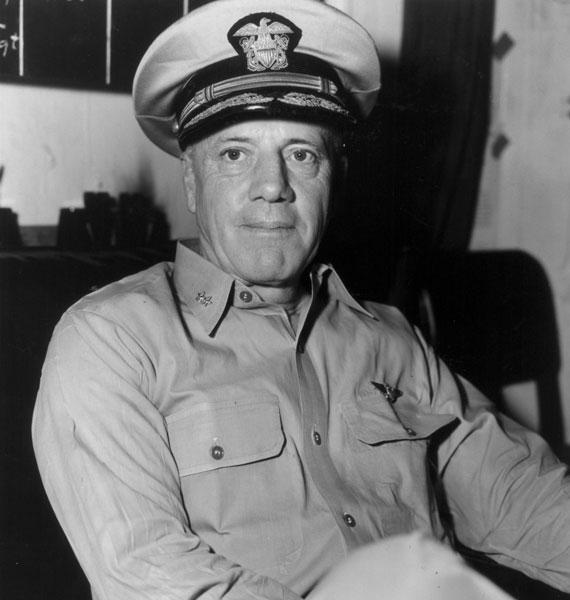

3rd Military Governor of Guam
- In office May 30, 1946 – September 27, 1949
- Preceded by: Henry Louis Larsen
- Succeeded by: Carlton Skinner, First Appointed Governor of Guam

Personal details
- Born: October 4, 1887 Atglen, Pennsylvania, US
- Died: July 19, 1975 (aged 87) San Diego, California, US
- Resting place: El Camino Memorial Park, Sorrento Valley, San Diego, CA
- Spouse: Mary Chenoweth Pownall
- Awards: Navy Cross; Navy DSM; Legion of Merit; Navy Commendation Medal
- Nickname: "Baldy"

Military service
- Allegiance: United States
- Branch/service: United States Navy
- Years of service: 1910–1949
- Rank: Vice admiral
- Commands: USS Reid (DD-21); USS Vedette (SP-163); USS John D. Ford (DD-228); USS Enterprise (CV-6); USS Yorktown (CV-10)
- Battles/wars: World War I: Atlantic U-boat Campaign; World War II: Gilbert and Marshall Islands campaign

Charles Alan Pownall (October 4, 1887 – July 19, 1975) was a vice admiral in the United States Navy and Governor of Guam (May 30, 1946 – September 27, 1949). He was the third military Governor and first naval Governor of Guam following the United States recapture of the island from the Japanese. After conflict with the Guam Congress in 1948, Pownall replaced many Congressmen with his own appointments, whom the Guamanians refused to recognize. The ensuing protest persuaded President Truman to transfer control of the island away from the Navy. As a consequence, Charles Pownall was the last military governor of Guam.

== Military service ==
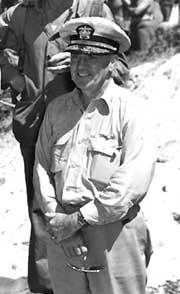
Charles A. Pownall after the capture of Roi-Namur.

=== Early career ===
Charles A. Pownall was born on October 4, 1887, in Atglen, Pennsylvania, and after the graduation from high school, he received an appointment to the United States Naval Academy at Annapolis, Maryland. He graduated in June 1910 and was commissioned as an ensign on that date. Pownall then served briefly aboard the battleships USS Mississippi and USS Missouri, and the destroyers USS Ammen and USS Reid. He also participated in the Veracruz expedition in mid-1914.

=== World War I ===
During World War I, Lieutenant Commander Pownall commanded the patrol vessel USS Vedette on convoy escort and antisubmarine operations in the Atlantic Ocean and European waters and was awarded the Navy Cross; citation as follows:

For distinguished service in the line of his profession as commanding officer of the USS Vedette, engaged in the important exacting and hazardous duty of transporting and escorting troops and supplies through waters infested with enemy submarines and mines.

=== Interwar ===
During the 1920s, Lieutenant Commander Pownall served as the first commanding officer of the destroyer USS John D. Ford. He completed flight training and was designated a naval aviator in 1927. He then served as navigator aboard the aircraft carrier USS Saratoga and as air officer aboard the USS Lexington. Pownall later had duty on the staffs of Commander in Chief Battle Fleet and Commander Aircraft Squadrons Battle Fleet. From 21 December 1938 to 21 March 1941, he commanded the aircraft carrier USS Enterprise.

=== World War II ===
During World War II, Pownall commanded the fast aircraft carrier Task Group 50.1 in the Pacific Theater with the aircraft carrier USS Yorktown as his flagship. He was in command of Task Force 50.1 when it raided the Japanese positions on Tarawa in the Gilbert Islands on 18 September 1943 in preparation for the American invasion that would follow in November 1943. Pownall distinguished himself in the early phase of the Gilbert Islands campaign and received the Navy Distinguished Service Medal.

After a perceived lack of aggressiveness during December 1943 and January 1944 raids against the Marshall Islands, Admiral Chester W. Nimitz ordered him replaced by Vice Admiral Marc Mitscher at the end of February 1944. Pownall subsequently commanded Naval Air Forces, Pacific Fleet before he was ordered back to the United States to command Naval Air Training Command. For his service in the later capacity, Pownall received the Legion of Merit.

In September 1945, Pownall was ordered back to the Pacific area and served as Commander Naval Forces Marianas with additional duty as military Governor of Guam from 30 May 1946. In addition to his wartime decorations, he was decorated with the Navy Commendation Medal and two Navy Presidential Unit Citations.

== Governorship ==
Powmall helped organize much of Guam's basic government, and also approved the flag of Guam and the seal of Guam.

=== Congressional walkout ===
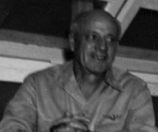
Pownall sitting on the Guam Island Court in 1947

In 1948, Pownall, along with the United States Secretary of the Navy, gave the Guam Congress the power to create laws, pending the governor's approval. The Secretary of the Navy had the power to override a veto from either the Guam Congress or Governor Pownall. When the Guam Congress attempted to pass a law allowing them to subpoena American citizens, Pownall vetoed it. Despite this, while investigating suspected abuses involving Americans owning businesses through Guamanian frontmen, the Congress subpoenaed Abe Goldstein over his involvement in a local women's clothing store. Citing Pownall's veto, Goldstein refused to testify. The Guam Congress cited Goldstein for contempt and issued a warrant for his arrest, but were stopped by Pownall.

When confronted, Pownall told Guam Speaker of the House Antonio Borja Won Pat to leave the matter to him. When Won Pat passed on the information to the House Assembly, they became angered at Pownall's comments. Stirred by Pownall and with media support, the House resolved to pass a bill requesting citizenship for Guamanians, and decided not to reassemble until the U.S. Congress had addressed the bill. On March 12, Pownall called a special joint session of Congress, but most Congressional members refused to attend. Pownall dismissed all those Congressmen who chose to break the law by not attending, and appointed replacements.

The dismissals caused outrage among Guamanians and 12 of Guam's 19 villages voted not to recognize the replacements. President Harry Truman ordered an investigation into the incident. Upon review, Truman ordered a transitional government created, and pressured Pownall to restore the former Congressmen to their seats on 2 April 1948. In September 1949, administration of Guam was transferred to the United States Department of the Interior. Under the new government, the Governor of Guam was appointed by the President. Truman appointed Carlton S. Skinner as Guam's first civilian Governor, replacing Pownall. Pownall was the last military governor of Guam.

=== Retirement ===
Pownall retired in October 1949 and was advanced to the rank of vice admiral on the retired list for having been specially commended in combat.

== Personal life ==
Pownall's wife was Mary Chenoweth Pownall.

On July 19, 1975, Pownall died in San Diego, California. Pownall is interred at El Camino Memorial Park in San Diego, California.

== Awards ==
- Navy Cross
- Navy Distinguished Service Medal
- Legion of Merit
- Navy Commendation Medal
- Presidential Unit Citation with star (2 awards)
- World War I Victory Medal with "ESCORT" clasp
- American Defense Service Medal with "FLEET" clasp
- American Campaign Medal
- Asiatic-Pacific Campaign Medal
- World War II Victory Medal

Military offices
Preceded by Henry Louis Larsen	Governor of Guam; 1946–1949	Succeeded by Carlton Skinner; First Appointed Governor
