= Carlton Skinner =

American politician

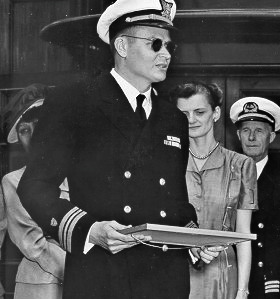
- Carlton Skinner on the USCGC Sea Cloud, June 1948

1st Appointed Governor of Guam
- In office September 17, 1949 – April 22, 1953
- Appointed by: Harry S. Truman
- Preceded by: Charles Alan Pownall (last military governor)
- Succeeded by: Randall S. Herman (acting); Ford Quint Elvidge

Personal details
- Born: April 8, 1913 Palo Alto, California, US
- Died: June 22, 2004 (aged 91) Boston, Massachusetts, US
- Party: Democratic
- Spouses: Jeanne Rowe Skinner (Divorced); Solange P. Skinner
- Children: 3
- Occupation: Journalist, Public Relations Director, Governor of Guam
- Nickname: The George Washington of Guam

Military service
- Allegiance: United States
- Branch/service: United States Coast Guard
- Rank: Commander
- Commands: USCGC Sea Cloud; USS Hoquiam

Carlton Skinner (April 8, 1913 – June 22, 2004) was the first civilian governor of Guam and a prominent advocate for the integration of the United States Armed Forces. President Harry Truman appointed Skinner governor in 1949, after the United States Navy ceded control of the island to the Department of the Interior.

== Life and education ==
Skinner was born in Palo Alto, California, to parents Macy Millmore Skinner (1871–1964) and Marian Weymouth Junkins (1880–1966). He attended Tilton School, an independent college preparatory school in Tilton, New Hampshire. He graduated from Tilton in 1930. Skinner then attended Wesleyan University, where he was a member of the fraternity that later became a chapter of Kappa Alpha Society and transferred from there to the University of California at Los Angeles. Prior to World War II, he was a correspondent for United Press International and The Wall Street Journal. From 1947 to 1949, he served as Public Relations Director and then as a special assistant to the United States Secretary of the Interior.

== Military service ==
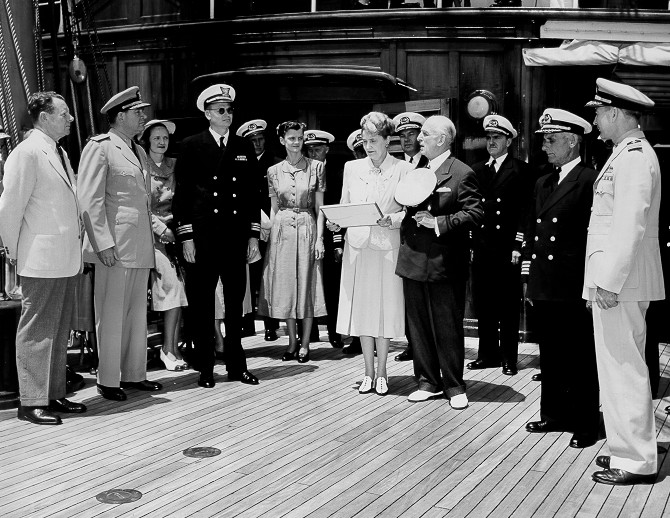
Skinner aboard the USCGC Sea Cloud during a ceremony.

As a Coast Guard Lieutenant, Skinner commanded the USCGC Sea Cloud, a weather ship. When the United States entered World War II, the Coast Guard was integrated into the Navy, and the Sea Cloud was sent out on combat service. Leaving Boston, the Sea Cloud participated in sinking one submarine. Earlier, while serving as executive officer of the USCGC Northland, Skinner began to question the Armed Forces policy of ship segregation. The Northland, stranded during a patrol with no engine, was saved when a black steward crewman got the engine started after white engineers had been unable to do so.

When Skinner recommended the man for promotion, he was told that blacks were allowed to be only steward's mates. Seeking to prove a point, Skinner sailed with the Navy's first fully integrated crew since the Civil War, with duties spread equally among white and black crewmen. Skinner had only two black officers on his crew, Clarence Samuels and Joseph C. Jenkins. Nationally renowned black artist Jacob Lawrence, whose paintings were already in the collections of New York's Museum of Modern Art and the Phillips Collection in Washington, D.C., was among the men who served on the Sea Cloud under Lieutenant Skinner.

After the Sea Cloud, Skinner commanded a second integrated crew aboard the USS Hoquiam near the Aleutian Islands. Noting the success of Skinner's two commands, the Navy integrated the USS Mason and dropped ship segregation completely within the next few decades. Master Chief Petty Officer of the Coast Guard Vincent W. Patton III said of Skinner, "I will say without question that he was the front guard of integrating the U.S. military forces in World War II, and the man got very little credit for it."

== Governorship ==
When the Department of the Interior began to oversee Guam, Skinner was a Public Relations Officer for the Department. After the Department selected him and the Department of the Navy ceded control, Truman appointed Carlton Skinner governor of Guam on September 17, 1949. As governor, Skinner established Guam's first teacher's college which later evolved into a university as the University of Guam. He also wrote the Constitution of Guam, which is still in use today.

== Post-governorship ==
After leaving the governor's post in 1953, Skinner lived in various locations around the world, serving as chief financial officer for American President Lines, Colt Industries, and Fairbanks-Morse. John F. Kennedy and Lyndon B. Johnson appointed Skinner to two consecutive terms on the South Pacific Commission. He eventually became a San Francisco businessman and owner of Skinner & Co., a financial consulting firm.

== Death ==
Skinner died of heart failure on June 22, 2004, in Boston, Massachusetts, at the age of 91.

== Legacy ==
A plaza in Agana is named in Skinner's honor. A Coast Guard Fast Response Cutter (FRC) Maintenance Team Building at Naval Base Guam is also named in his honor.

=== Tilton School ===
Skinner and his wife, Solange P. Skinner, had a deep relationship with his alma mater, Tilton School. They often visited the campus, gave advice to the administration concerning the school's climate, and were major donors to the school. They created The Governor Carlton Skinner and Solange Skinner Fellowship at Tilton School, to “provide financial assistance to a student or students who exhibit a consistent sense of personal integrity, loyalty, and curiosity and who have demonstrated a commitment to fight injustice in all its forms.” Skinner was awarded the George L. Plimpton Award from Tilton in 1989 for his "passion for equality and freedom". Tilton School named part of their new academic building Skinner Tower, a 2-story glass tower which connects Plimpton Hall to the new academic building. In addition, The Governor Carlton Skinner Prize is "awarded annually to a member of the graduating class who, in the opinion of the Student Assembly and the Head of School, has consistently demonstrated a sense of personal integrity, loyalty, curiosity, and who has demonstrated a commitment to fight injustice in all its forms."

Government offices
Preceded by Charles Alan Pownall; Last Military Governor	Governor of Guam; 1949–1953	Succeeded by Ford Quint Elvidge
