= James Thomas Alexander =

37th Naval Governor of Guam

37th Naval Governor of Guam
- In office February 8, 1938 – April 20, 1940
- Preceded by: Benjamin McCandlish
- Succeeded by: George McMillin

Personal details
- Born: August 25, 1888 Wichita, Kansas
- Died: January 16, 1952 (aged 63) San Diego, California
- Education: United States Naval Academy
- Awards: Navy Cross

Military service
- Allegiance: United States
- Branch/service: United States Navy
- Rank: Captain
- Commands: USS Sterett; USS Porter; USS Astoria; USS Wichita
- Battles/wars: World War I World War II

James Thomas Alexander (August 25, 1888 – January 16, 1952) was a United States Navy captain who served as the 37th naval governor of Guam. He served as a commanding officer of ships during both World War I and World War II, receiving the Navy Cross for his actions during the First World War. He was an outspoken advocate for increased naval power and bases to improve American defensive networks. As governor, he improved the defenses of Guam by building additional military facilities, dredging the Apra Harbor, increasing the officers on the island, and building a sea wall.

== Life ==
Alexander was born on August 25, 1888, and lived much of his life in Kansas. He died on January 16, 1952.

== Naval career ==
Alexander graduated from the United States Naval Academy in 1910. While there, he rowed for the Navy Midshipmen men's crew team. During World War I he served as commanding officer of both the USS Sterett and the USS Porter, for which he received the Navy Cross. Following the war, he commanded the Navy Ammunition Depot in Hawaii. In the 1930s, Alexander proved a strong advocate for the strengthening of American sea power as the key to maintaining a healthy national defense. Following his governorship, he commanded the USS Astoria. He commanded the USS Wichita during World War II. He retired from the Navy as a captain.

== Governorship ==
Alexander served as Naval Governor of Guam from February 8, 1938, to April 20, 1940. Air travel became more prevalent during his tenure as more people traveled to the island from the mainland United States and air mail arrived frequently. He recommended various methods to make the island more defensible, including building additional warehouses and harbor facilities, dredging Apra Harbor, constructing a sea wall and oil storage facilities, and the erection of six new officers barracks. He had to negotiate with the Japanese government in arranging the return of a number of Japanese fisherman who had been rescued when their ship Daichs Saiho Maru sunk in a restricted area of the Guamanian coast. He also oversaw the 1940 United States census on the island.

Military offices
Preceded by Benjamin McCandlish	Naval Governor of Guam; 1938–1941	Succeeded by George McMillin
