= Manuel Flores Leon Guerrero =

Governor of Guam from 1963 to 1969

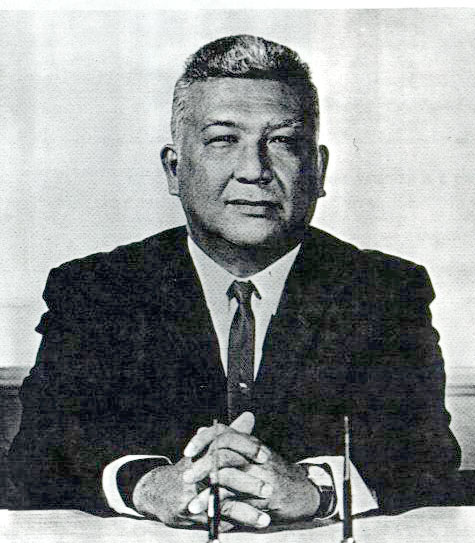

Governor of Guam
- In office January 20, 1963 – July 20, 1969; Acting: January 20, 1963 – March 9, 1963
- Appointed by: John F. Kennedy
- Lieutenant: Denver Dickerson
- Preceded by: Bill Daniel
- Succeeded by: Carlos Camacho

5th Secretary of Guam
- In office May 20, 1961 – March 9, 1963
- Governor: Bill Daniel
- Preceded by: A. M. Edwards
- Succeeded by: Denver Dickerson

Personal details
- Born: Manuel Flores Leon Guerrero; October 25, 1914; Agana, Guam, U.S.
- Died: October 9, 1985 (aged 70); Tamuning, Guam, U.S.
- Political party: Democratic
- Spouse(s): Delfina Tuncap Guerrero (Divorced), Antonia Rabon
- Children: 11 (7 with Tuncap, 4 with Rabon)
- Other names: Manuel F. L. Guerrero

Manuel Flores "Carson" Leon Guerrero (October 29, 1914 – October 9, 1985) was a Guamanian politician who is the sixth Appointed Governor of Guam from March 1963 to July 1969. He was appointed to the office after the term of Bill Daniel. He was a member of the Democratic Party of Guam and was the first of native Chamorro descent to rise to the highest office in the territory.

== Early life ==
Manuel F. Leon Guerrero was born on October 25, 1914, to his parents Jose L.G. Leon Guerrero (dec.) and Maria Lujan Flores (dec.) of Agana, and was the oldest of three children.

== World War II ==
During the first days of the Japanese occupation of Guam, Leon Guerrero's role within Guam's Naval government made him a marked man. He spent the early days of the occupation with family in tow evading capture by hiding in the jungles of Guam. Along with many other of the Chamorro people, Leon Guerrero was eventually interned for a period by the Japanese military. Following his internment, he was forced to work on a manpower study made by the Japanese Military Government. During the remainder of the occupation, he supported his family by farming, except during periods he was assigned to forced labor camps with other Chamorros.

== Early Post-war career ==
Leon Guerrero first served as a member of the Guam Congress from 1948 to 1950 as Chairman of the Finance Committee. He later became a leading member of the first Guam Legislature as Chairman of the Rules Committee and held several executive branch positions before his appointment as Secretary of Guam under Governor Bill Daniel.

His other early public offices include:

- Chairman of the Guam Land Transfer Board, 1950
- Special assistant to the Governor of Guam, 1951
- Acting Governor and Secretary of Guam at various times from 1950 to 1956
- Alternate Commissioner to the South Pacific Commission, 1962

== Appointment ==
During the years following World War II, Guam went through a series of gubernatorial appointments. Although Leon Guerrero continued to work in various civil positions, it wasn't until the appointment of Governor Bill Daniel that a true leadership opportunity emerged.

Governor Daniel resigned from his position in September 1962, but his resignation was not accepted by President John F. Kennedy until January 1963. Meanwhile, Daniel went on a world tour during this period. After Daniel departed Guam, Leon Guerrero was left in charge, as the next highest public official, until a new governor was appointed.

During this time, super typhoon Karen hit Guam in November 1962, destroying much of Guam and leaving Leon Guerrero to deal with the aftermath. Leon Guerrero dealt with the situation well, leading to his appointment as governor of Guam by President Kennedy.

== Governorship (1963–1969) ==
=== First term ===
During his first term as governor, Leon Guerrero established the Guam Tourist Commission, whose purpose was to move the island's economy away from military dependence to one based on commercial tourism. The commission's efforts were realized on May 1, 1967, when a Pan American World Airways flight arrived on Guam with 109 tourists from neighboring Japan. Over the course of that year, more than 6,000 visitors arrived on Guam. As of the early 2000s, tourism now accounts for over a million visitors a year and is the leading industry of the island.

=== Second term ===
During the turbulent times of the Vietnam war, Governor Leon Guerrero was appointed to a second term by President Lyndon B. Johnson in 1967. Although Leon Guerrero received much praise from Johnson for his leadership over the past term, Johnson felt the territorial island of 77,000 had matured and was ready to begin democratically electing its leaders. In 1970, Leon Guerrero entered the gubernatorial race under the democratic ticket. Leon Guerrero and running mate "Tony" Yamashita were narrowly defeated by the Ricardo Bordallo and Richard F. Taitano team in a contentious primary. Ultimately, Republican Carlos Camacho took the general election to become the first freely elected governor of Guam.

== Personal life ==
Guerrero and his first wife Delfina Tuncap had seven children. The two divorced in the 1970s. Guerrero later married Antonia Rabon, and together, they had four children.

Guerrero retired and died in Tamuning on October 9, 1985, at the age of 70. He was buried at the Guam Memorial Park in Leyang, Barrigada.

Government offices
Preceded by Bill Daniel	Governor of Guam; 1963–1969	Succeeded by Carlos Camacho
Preceded by A.M. Edwards	Secretary of Guam; 1961–1963	Succeeded by Denver Dickerson
