= List of governors of Guam =

Chief executives of the unincorporated U.S. territory

Governor of Guam
- I Maga'låhi / Maga'håga Guåhan
- Territory seal

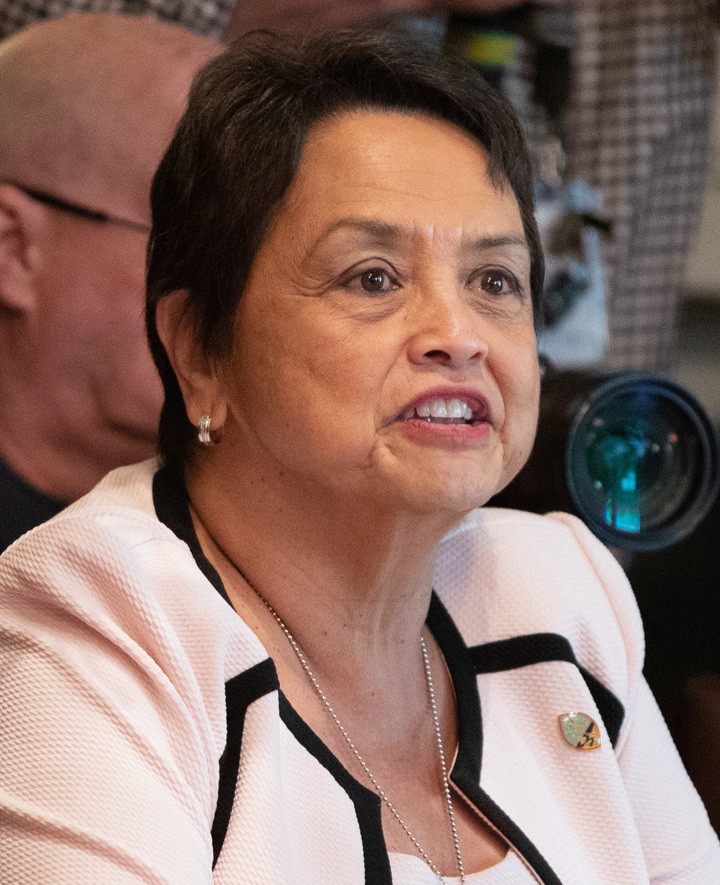
- Incumbent; Lou Leon Guerrero since January 7, 2019
- Style: The Honorable (formal)
- Residence: Government House (Agaña Heights)
- Seat: Ricardo J. Bordallo Governor's Complex (Adelup)
- Term length: Four-year term, renewable once
- Constituting instrument: Organic Act of Guam
- Inaugural holder: Carlos Camacho
- Formation: January 4, 1971
- Succession: Line of succession
- Deputy: Lieutenant Governor of Guam (Josh Tenorio)
- Salary: $90,000 (2013)

The governor of Guam (Chamorro: I Maga'låhen / Maga'håga Guåhan) is the head of government of Guam and the commander-in-chief of the Guam National Guard, whose responsibilities also include making the annual State of the Island (formerly the State of the Territory) addresses to the Guam Legislature, submitting the budget, and ensuring that Guam's public laws are enforced. The position was created in 1968, through the passage of the Guam Elected Governors Act which took effect in 1970. Guam elected its first civilian governor in 1970 with the inauguration of former governor Carlos Camacho.

The current governor is Lou Leon Guerrero, a Democrat who was inaugurated on January 7, 2019, following her election in 2018.

== Powers and duties ==
The governor has a duty to enforce Guam's public laws, the power to either approve or veto bills passed by the Guam Legislature, to convene the legislature, and to commute or grant pardons to criminal sentences, except in cases of treason and impeachment. The governor is given the power to control government budgeting and appoint many officials (including many judges).

Unlike the other government departments that compose the executive branch of government, the governor is themselves head of the state executive department. The governor may also perform ceremonial roles, such as greeting dignitaries, issuing symbolic proclamations or commencing the Liberation Day parade.

As the commander-in-chief of the Guam National Guard, the governor, as well as the president, may call on the Guard at a moment's notice to provide defense for the island, in a state of emergency.

The governor also delivers the annual State of the Island address (similar to the State of the State address in the US) to a special session of the Guam Legislature. The speech is given to satisfy a constitutional stipulation that a governor must report annually, or in older constitutions described as being "from time to time", on the state or condition of the territory.

== Seat and residence ==
Sitting along Route 1, the governor's seat of power is located in Adelup in the Ricardo J. Bordallo Governor's Complex, named after the island's 2nd and 4th governor, Ricardo Bordallo.

The governor lives in their official residence at the Government House in Agaña Heights. The island's former Spanish and American military governors had lived in the Governor's Palace in the Plaza de España (Hagåtña) until its destruction in the shelling of Hagåtña during the reconquest of Guam in World War II.

== Election process ==
=== Eligibility ===
According to the Elective Governors Act:

"No person shall be eligible for election to the office of Governor or Lieutenant Governor unless he/she is an eligible voter and has been for five consecutive years immediately preceding the election a citizen of the United States and a bona fide resident of Guam and will be, at the time of taking office, at least thirty years of age. The Governor shall maintain his/her official residence in Guam during his/her incumbency."

To be eligible, a candidate for Governor of Guam must:

- an eligible voter of Guam
- a United States citizen
- at least thirty years of age.
- has lived in Guam for five years, preceding the general election.

=== Election ===
According to the Elective Governor Acts of 1968, the Governor of Guam, together with the Lieutenant Governor, shall be elected by a majority of the votes cast by the people who are qualified to vote for the members of the Legislature of Guam. The Governor and Lieutenant Governor shall be chosen jointly, by the casting by each voter of a single vote applicable to both offices. The first election for Governor and Lieutenant Governor was held on November 3, 1970, with the election of Governor Carlos Camacho and Lt. Governor Kurt Moylan. Beginning in 1974, Guam's Governor and Lieutenant Governor is elected by direct vote, on the first Tuesday of November. The Governor and Lieutenant Governor shall hold office for a term of four years and until their successors are elected and qualified.

=== Inauguration ===
The Governor of Guam usually takes the oath of office on the first Monday of January. In past inaugurations, however, the governor-elect and lieutenant governor-elect would take the oath of office past midnight on Monday morning.

Traditionally, the lieutenant governor-elect takes the oath first and delivers his inaugural remarks, followed then by the incoming governor-elect. As soon as the governor takes the oath of office, four ruffles and flourishes are played then followed by "The Stars and Stripes Forever" and a 21-gun salute. The newly inaugurated governor delivers his inaugural address, an opportunity for the new leader to state his goals for the next 4 years.

=== Oath of office ===
Pursuant to the Guam Organic Act, the governor's term of office begins at midnight on the first Monday of January of the year following the election. The day marks the beginning of the four-year term of the Governor and Lieutenant Governor of Guam. Before executing the powers as the Governor of Guam, the governor must take an oath of office:

I, (name), duly elected Governor of Guam, do solemnly swear, in the presence of the Almighty God, that I will well and faithfully support the Constitution of the United States, the laws of the United States applicable to Guam, and the laws of Guam, and that I will conscientiously and impartially discharge my duties as the Governor of Guam.

In line with traditional oath-takings, governors have traditionally palmed a Bible and have added, "So help me God!" at the end of their oaths. The Governor of Guam is sworn in by the Chief Justice of Guam.

== Tenure and term limits ==
The Governor of Guam is only limited two terms as prescribed in the Elective Governors Act:

- No person who has been elected Governor for two full successive terms shall again be eligible to hold that office until one full term has intervened.
- The term of the elected Governor and Lieutenant Governor shall commence on the first Monday of January following the date of election.

However, a former governor can be re-elected once again only after a full term has passed.

== History ==
=== Spanish era ===
In 1565, Miguel López de Legazpi formally declared Spanish sovereignty over the Mariana Islands. However, there was no permanent Spanish presence on the island and it was ruled from the Philippines as part of the Spanish East Indies by the Governor-General of the Philippines. Diego Luis de San Vitores established a mission on Guam in 1668, but Francisco de Irrisari was the first person to take the title "Governor" in June 1676, amidst the Spanish-Chamorro Wars. Antonio de Saravia, who arrived in June 1681, was the first to receive his appointment as governor from the Spanish throne, meaning that, technically, he was no longer subordinate to rule from the Philippines or Mexico.

=== American capture of the territory (1898) ===
Portrait	Name	Took office	Left office
	Henry Glass, Admiral	June 12, 1898	June 22, 1898
	Francisco Martínez Portusach	June 22, 1898	December 12, 1898

=== Political instability (1898–1899) ===
Portrait	Name	Took office	Left office	Notes
	José Sisto	December 12, 1898	December 31, 1898	overthrew Portusach
	Venancio Roberto	December 31, 1898	January 2, 1899	overthrew Sisto
	José Sisto	January 2, 1899	February 1, 1899	put back in power by US Navy
	Edward D. Taussig	February 1, 1899	February 13, 1899	re-asserted USN authority, put a local council in place
	Don Joaquin Perez y Cruz	February 13, 1899	April 20, 1899	local council
	William Coe	April 20, 1899	May 9, 1899	local council
	Louis A. Kaiser	May 9, 1899	August 7, 1899	local council

=== American Naval governors (1899–1941) ===
No.	Portrait	Name	Took office	Left office
1		Richard Phillips Leary	August 7, 1899	July 12, 1900
–		William Edwin Safford; Acting	June 12, 1900	July 19, 1900
2		Seaton Schroeder	July 12, 1900	January 25, 1903
–		William Swift; Acting	January 25, 1903	February 6, 1903
3		William Elbridge Sewell	February 6, 1903	May 16, 1904
–		Frank Herman Schofield; Acting	January 11, 1904	January 28, 1904
–		Raymond Stone; Acting	January 28, 1904	May 16, 1904
4		George Leland Dyer	May 16, 1904	November 2, 1905
5		Luke McNamee	November 2, 1905	December 3, 1906
6		Templin Morris Potts	December 3, 1906	October 3, 1907
–		Luke McNamee; Acting	October 3, 1907	December 28, 1907
7		Edward John Dorn	December 28, 1907	November 5, 1910
8		Frank Freyer	November 5, 1910	January 21, 1911
9		George Salisbury	January 21, 1911	January 30, 1912
10		Robert Edward Coontz	January 30, 1912	September 23, 1913
11		Alfred Walton Hinds	September 23, 1913	March 28, 1914
12		William John Maxwell	March 28, 1914	April 29, 1916
–		William P. Cronan; Acting	April 29, 1916	May 18, 1916
–		Edward E. Simpson; Acting	May 18, 1916	May 30, 1916
13		Roy Campbell Smith	May 30, 1916	November 18, 1918
14		William Gilmer	November 18, 1918	November 22, 1919
–		William A. Hodgman; Acting	November 22, 1919	December 21, 1919
15		William Gilmer	December 21, 1919	July 7, 1920
16		Ivan Wettengel	July 7, 1920	February 27, 1921
17		James Sutherland Spore	February 27, 1921	February 7, 1922
–		Adelbert Althouse; Acting	February 7, 1922	December 8, 1922
–		John P. Miller; Acting	December 8, 1922	December 14, 1922
18		Adelbert Althouse	December 14, 1922	August 4, 1923
19		Henry Bertram Price	August 4, 1923	August 26, 1924
20		Alfred Winsor Brown	August 26, 1924	August 7, 1926
23		Lloyd Stowell Shapley	August 7, 1926	June 11, 1929
24		Willis W. Bradley	June 11, 1929	March 15, 1931
25		Edmund Root	March 15, 1931	June 21, 1933
26		George A. Alexander	June 21, 1933	March 27, 1936
27		Benjamin McCandlish	March 27, 1936	February 8, 1938
28		James Thomas Alexander	February 8, 1938	April 20, 1940
29		George McMillin	April 20, 1940	December 10, 1941

=== Japanese military governors (1941–1944) ===
Name (Birth–Death)	Took office	Left office
Tomitarō Horii (1890–1942)	December 10, 1941	January 1942
Hayashi Hiromu	January 1942	June 1942
Homura Teiichi	June 1942	March 1944
Takeshi Takashina (1891–1944)	March 1944	July 28, 1944
Hideyoshi Obata (1890–1944)	July 28, 1944	August 11, 1944

=== American military governors (1944–1949) ===
Name (Birth–Death)	Took office	Left office
Roy Stanley Geiger (1885–1947)	July 21, 1944	August 10, 1944
Henry Louis Larsen (1890–1962)	August 10, 1944	May 30, 1946
Charles Alan Pownall (1887–1975)	May 30, 1946	September 27, 1949

=== Appointed civilian governors (1949–1971) ===
No.	Governor (Birth–Death)	Took office	Left office	Appointed by	Acting Governor
1	Carlton Skinner (1913–2004)	September 17, 1949	April 22, 1953	Harry S. Truman	Randall S. Herman (February 20, 1953 – April 22, 1953)
2	Ford Elvidge (1892–1980)	April 23, 1953	October 2, 1956	Dwight D. Eisenhower	William Corbett (May 19, 1956 – October 2, 1956)
3	Richard Lowe (1902–1972)	October 2, 1956	July 9, 1960	Dwight D. Eisenhower	Marcellus Boss (November 14, 1959 – August 22, 1960)
4	Joseph Flores (1900–1981)	July 9, 1960	May 20, 1961	Dwight D. Eisenhower	
5	Bill Daniel (1915–2006)	May 20, 1961	March 9, 1963	John F. Kennedy	Carson Guerrero (January 20, 1963 – March 9, 1963)
6	Carson Guerrero (1914–1985)	March 9, 1963	July 20, 1969	John F. Kennedy	
7	Carlos Camacho (1924–1979)	July 20, 1969	January 4, 1971	Richard Nixon	

=== Elected governors (1971–present) ===
Democratic (4) Republican (5)
Governor		Start	End	Party	Elected	Prior Office	Lieutenant Governor
1	Carlos Camacho (1924–1979)	January 4, 1971	January 6, 1975 (lost election)	Republican	1970	Appointed Governor of Guam	Kurt Moylan
2	Ricardo Bordallo (1927–1990)	January 6, 1975	January 1, 1979 (lost election)	Democratic	1974	Senator of the Guam Legislature	Rudy Sablan
3	Paul Calvo (1934–2024)	January 1, 1979	January 3, 1983 (lost election)	Republican	1978	Senator of the Guam Legislature	Joseph Ada
4	Ricardo Bordallo (1927–1990)	January 3, 1983	January 5, 1987 (lost election)	Democratic	1982	Senator of the Guam Legislature	Eddie Reyes
5	Joseph Ada (born 1943)	January 5, 1987	January 2, 1995 (lost election)	Republican	1986; 1990	Lieutenant Governor of Guam	Frank Blas
6	Carl Gutierrez (born 1941)	January 2, 1995	January 6, 2003 (lost renomination)	Democratic	1994; 1998	Senator of the Guam Legislature	Madeleine Bordallo
7	Felix Camacho (born 1957)	January 6, 2003	January 3, 2011 (term limited)	Republican	2002; 2006	Senator of the Guam Legislature	Kaleo Moylan
7	Felix Camacho (born 1957)	January 6, 2003	January 3, 2011 (term limited)	Republican	2002; 2006	Senator of the Guam Legislature	Michael Cruz
8	Eddie Calvo (born 1961)	January 3, 2011	January 7, 2019 (term limited)	Republican	2010; 2014	Senator of the Guam Legislature	Ray Tenorio
9	Lou Leon Guerrero (born 1950)	January 7, 2019	Incumbent	Democratic	2018; 2022	Senator of the Guam Legislature	Josh Tenorio

== See also ==
- List of governors of the Spanish Mariana Islands
- List of governors of the Northern Mariana Islands
- First ladies and gentlemen of Guam
