= Index of Guam-related articles =

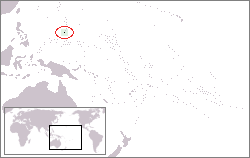
The location of Guam in the western North Pacific Ocean

The following is an alphabetical list of articles related to the United States Territory of Guam.

== 0–9 ==
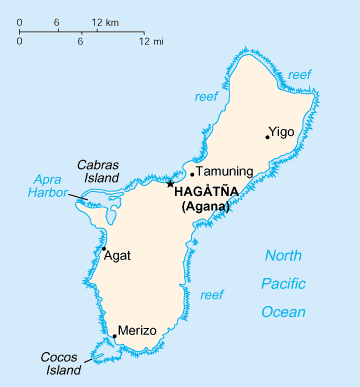
An enlargeable map of the United States Territory of Guam

- .gu – Internet country code top-level domain for Guam

== A ==
- Airports in Guam
- Area code 671
- Atlas of Guam

== B ==
- Birds of Guam
- Buildings and structures in Guam
  - commons:Category:Buildings and structures in Guam

== C ==
The Coat of Arms of Guam

- Capital of Guam
- Chamorro people
  - Category:Chamorro
    - commons:Category:Chamorro
- Cities in Guam
- Climate of Guam
- Coat of Arms of Guam
- Cocos Island
- Colleges and universities in Guam
  - University of Guam
  - Guam Community College
  - commons:Category:Universities and colleges in Guam
- Communications in Guam
- Constitution of Guam
- Culture of Guam
- Cyclones in Guam

== D ==
- Delegates to the United States House of Representatives from Guam
- Demographics of Guam

== E ==
- Economy of Guam
  - Category:Economy of Guam
    - commons:Category:Economy of Guam
- Education in Guam
  - commons:Category:Education in Guam
- Elections in Guam
  - Category:Elections in Guam
- Energy in Guam
- Environment of Guam
  - commons:Category:Environment of Guam

== F ==
The Flag of Guam

- Fanohge Chamoru (Stand Ye Guamanians)
- Flag of Guam

== G ==
- Geography of Guam
  - Category:Geography of Guam
    - commons:Category:Geography of Guam
- Government of the Territory of Guam (website)
- Governor of the Territory of Guam
  - List of governors of Guam
- GU – United States Postal Service postal code for the Territory of Guam
- Guam (website)
  - Category:Guam
    - commons:Category:Guam
      - commons:Category:Maps of Guam
- Guam Police Department
- Guam Public School System
- Gun laws in Guam

== H ==
- Hagåtña, Guam, capital since 1668
- Higher education in Guam
- History of Guam
  - Historical outline of Guam
    - Category:History of Guam
      - commons:Category:History of Guam

== I ==
- Images of Guam
- Islands of Guam
  - Cocos Island
  - Guam

== L ==
- Languages of Guam
- Law enforcement in Guam
- Lists related to Guam:
  - List of airports in Guam
  - List of birds of Guam
  - List of cities in Guam
  - List of colleges and universities in Guam
  - List of delegates to the United States House of Representatives from Guam
  - List of earthquakes in Guam
  - List of governors of Guam
  - List of Guam-related topics
  - List of islands of Guam
  - List of newspapers in Guam
  - List of political parties in Guam
  - List of radio stations in Guam
  - List of Registered Historic Places in Guam
  - List of rivers of Guam
  - List of schools in Guam
  - List of Superfund sites in Guam
  - List of television stations in Guam
  - List of villages of Guam
  - List of wettest known tropical cyclones in Guam
  - Vehicle registration plates of Guam

== M ==
- Mariana Islands
- Micronesia
- Micronesia challenge
- Military in Guam
- Music of Guam

== N ==
- Newspapers in Guam
- Mariana Islands

== P ==
- Pacific Basin Development Council
- List of people from Guam
- Politics of Guam
  - List of political parties in Guam
  - Category:Politics of Guam
    - commons:Category:Politics of Guam
- Postage stamps and postal history of Guam

== R ==
- Radio stations in Guam
- Registered historic places in Guam
  - commons:Category:Registered Historic Places in Guam
- Religion in Guam
- Rivers of Guam

== S ==
- Schools in Guam
- Scouting in Guam
- Society of Guam
  - commons:Category:Guam society
- Sports in Guam
  - commons:Category:Sports in Guam
- Superfund sites in Guam

== T ==
- Telecommunications in Guam
- Telephone area code 671
- Television stations in Guam
- Territory of Guam (website)
  - Constitution of Guam
  - Government of the Territory of Guam
  - List of Guam Governors
  - Supreme Court of Guam
  - Villages of Guam
- Topic outline of Guam
- Tourism in Guam (website)
  - commons:Category:Tourism in Guam
- Transportation in Guam
- Tropical cyclones in Guam
  - Category:Typhoons in Guam

== U ==
- Underwater diving on Guam
- United States of America
  - Guam's at-large congressional district
  - List of Delegates to the United States House of Representatives from Guam
  - Political divisions of the United States
  - United States Court of Appeals for the Ninth Circuit
  - United States District Court for the District of Guam
- Universities and colleges in Guam
  - University of Guam
  - Guam Community College
  - commons:Category:Universities and colleges in Guam

== V ==
- Villages of Guam

== W ==
- Wikimedia
  - Wikimedia Commons Atlas of Guam
  - Wikimedia Commons Category:Guam
    - commons:Category:Maps of Guam
  - Wikinews:Category:Guam
    - Wikinews:Portal:Guam
  - Wikipedia Category:Guam
    - Wikipedia:WikiProject Micronesia/Guam work group
      - Wikipedia:WikiProject Micronesia/Guam work group#Recognized content
      - Wikipedia:WikiProject Micronesia/Guam work group#Participants
    - Wikipedia:WikiProject Topic outline/Drafts/Topic outline of Guam

== Z ==
- Zen Habits, blog by a writer from Guam

== See also ==
- Topic overview:
  - Guam
  - Outline of Guam
