= Outline of Guam =

Island and U.S. territory in Micronesia

The Flag of Guam

The Seal of Guam

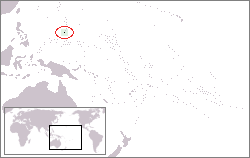
The location of Guam

The following outline is provided as an overview of and topical guide to Guam:

Guam – organized, unincorporated territory of the United States of America that comprises the island of Guam in the western North Pacific Ocean. It is one of five U.S. territories with an established civilian government. The island's capital is Hagåtña (formerly Agana). Guam is the largest and southernmost of the Mariana Islands. The Chamorros, Guam's indigenous inhabitants, first populated the island approximately 4,000 years ago. Discovered by the Spanish expedition of Ferdinand Magellan in 1521, the island has a long history of European colonialism beginning in the 16th century, and especially in 1668 with the arrival of Spanish settlers including Padre San Vitores, a Catholic missionary. Guam and the rest of the Mariana Islands were integrated in the Spanish East Indies since 1565. The island was a major stopover for Manila Galleons sailing from Acapulco, until 1815. Guam was taken over from Spain by the United States during the Spanish–American War in 1898. As the largest island in Micronesia and the only American-held island in the region before World War II, Guam was occupied by the Japanese between December 1941 and July 1944. Today, Guam's economy is mainly supported by tourism (primarily from Japan) and U.S. military bases.

== General reference ==
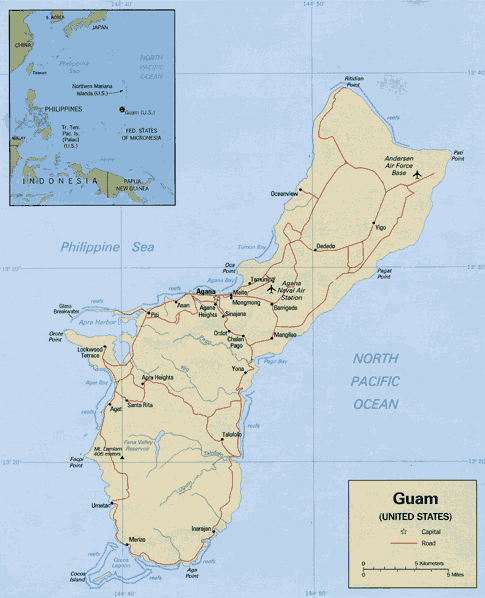
An enlargeable map of the United States Territory of Guam

- Pronunciation: /ˈɡwɑːm/
- Common English country name: Guam
- Official English country name: The United States Territory of Guam
- Common endonym(s): List of countries and capitals in native languages
- Official endonym(s): List of official endonyms of present-day nations and states
- Adjectival(s): Guamanian
- Demonym(s):
- Etymology: Name of Guam
- ISO country codes: GU, GUM, 316
- ISO region codes: See ISO 3166-2:GU
- Internet country code top-level domain: .gu

== Geography of Guam ==
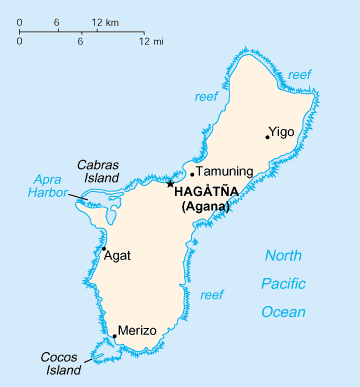
An enlargeable basic map of Guam

Geography of Guam

- Guam is: a United States territory
- Location:
  - Northern Hemisphere and Eastern Hemisphere
  - Pacific Ocean
    - North Pacific
      - Oceania
        - Micronesia
  - Time zone: Chamorro Standard Time (UTC+10)
  - Extreme points of Guam
    - High: Mount Lamlam 406 m (1,332 ft) – 11,377 meters above Challenger Deep
    - Low: North Pacific Ocean 0 m
  - Land boundaries: none
  - Coastline: 125.5 km (78.0 mi)
- Population of Guam: 173,000 – 179th most populous country
- Area of Guam: 541 km^{2} (209 sq mi)
- Atlas of Guam

=== Environment of Guam ===
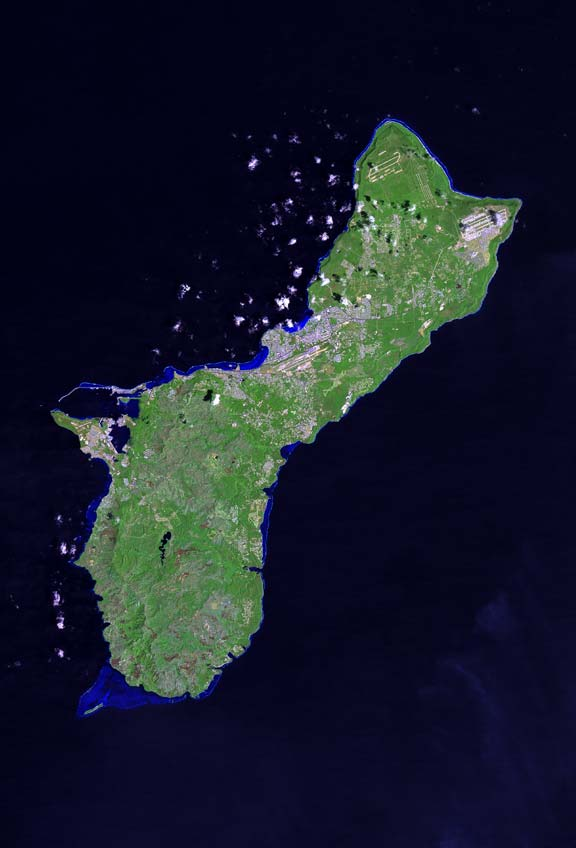
An enlargeable satellite image of Guam

- Climate of Guam
- Renewable energy in Guam
- Geology of Guam
- Protected areas of Guam
  - Biosphere reserves in Guam
  - National parks of Guam
- Superfund sites in Guam
- Wildlife of Guam
  - Fauna of Guam
    - Birds of Guam
    - Mammals of Guam

==== Natural geographic features of Guam ====
- Beaches in Guam
- Islands of Guam
- Lakes of Guam
- Mountains of Guam
  - Volcanoes in Guam
- Rivers of Guam
  - Waterfalls of Guam
- Valleys of Guam
- World Heritage Sites in Guam: None

=== Regions of Guam ===
- Regions of Guam

==== Ecoregions of Guam ====
- List of ecoregions in Guam

==== Administrative divisions of Guam ====
None

===== Municipalities of Guam =====
- Capital of Guam: Hagåtña
- Cities of Guam

=== Demography of Guam ===
- Demographics of Guam

== Government and politics of Guam ==
Politics of Guam

- Form of government: presidential representative democracy
- Capital of Guam: Hagåtña
- Elections in Guam
- Political parties in Guam

=== Branches of the government of Guam ===
Government of Guam

==== Executive branch of the government of Guam ====
- Head of state: President of United States
- Head of government: Governor of Guam
- Cabinet of Guam

==== Legislative branch of the government of Guam ====
- Legislature of Guam (unicameral)

==== Judicial branch of the government of Guam ====
Court system of Guam

- Supreme Court of Guam

=== Foreign relations of Guam ===
- Diplomatic missions in Guam

==== International organization membership ====
The United States Territory of Guam is a member of:

- International Olympic Committee (IOC)
- Secretariat of the Pacific Community (SPC)
- Universal Postal Union (UPU)

=== Law and order in Guam ===
Law of Guam

- Cannabis in Guam
- Constitution of Guam
- Crime in Guam
- Human rights in Guam
  - LGBT rights in Guam
  - Freedom of religion in Guam
- Law enforcement in Guam

=== Local government in Guam ===
Local government in Guam

== History of Guam ==
History of Guam

- Timeline of the history of Guam
- Current events of Guam

=== History of Guam, by period ===
- Geology of Guam
- Indigenous peoples
  - Chamorro people
- First European contact, 1521–1668
    - On March 6, 1521, three Spanish ships under the command of Fernão de Magalhães (Ferdinand Magellan) land on the Island of Guam after a seemingly endless eleven week voyage across the Pacific Ocean. Magalhães names the archipelago Las Isles de las Velas Latinas (The Islands of the Latine Sails). When the Spaniards refuse to pay for supplies, natives take iron from the ships. Magalhães renames the archipelago Las Islas de los Ladrones (The Islands of the Thieves).
- Spanish East Indies, 1565–(1668–1898)–1899
  - Diego Luis de San Vitores leads the colonization of Guam, renaming the Chamorro archipelago Islas Marianas in honor of his patroness, Queen Mariana of Austria
  - The Spanish-Chamorro Wars (1670-1683 on Guam) pacifies CHamoru resistance and solidifies Spanish control
  - Guam becomes a major stopover for Spanish galleons en route to Manila, from Acapulco. A number of coastal forts are built to protect these ships, including Fort Soledad and Fort San Jose in Umatac.
- Spanish–American War, April 23 – August 12, 1898
  - Spanish Empire declares war on the United States, April 23, 1898
  - United States capture of Guam, June 20–21, 1898
  - Treaty of Paris, December 10, 1898
- United States Territory of Guam, since December 10, 1898
  - World War I, June 28, 1914 – November 11, 1918
    - United States enters Great War on April 6, 1917
  - World War II, September 1, 1939 – September 2, 1945
    - United States enters Second World War on December 8, 1941
    - Battle of Guam of 1941
    - Battle of Guam of 1944
  - Cold War, March 5, 1946 – December 25, 1991
  - Korean War, June 25, 1950 – July 27, 1953
  - Guam Organic Act, August 1, 1950

== Culture of Guam ==
Culture of Guam

- Architecture of Guam
- Cuisine of Guam
- Festivals in Guam
- Languages of Guam
- Media in Guam
- National symbols of Guam
  - Coat of arms of Guam
  - Flag of Guam
  - National anthem of Guam
- People of Guam
- Public holidays in Guam
- Records of Guam
- Religion in Guam
  - Christianity in Guam
  - Hinduism in Guam
  - Islam in Guam
  - Judaism in Guam
  - Sikhism in Guam
- World Heritage Sites in Guam: None

=== Art in Guam ===
- Art in Guam
- Literature of Guam
- Music of Guam
- Television in Guam
- Theatre in Guam

=== Sports in Guam ===
Sports in Guam

- Football in Guam
- Guam at the Olympics

== Economy and infrastructure of Guam ==
Economy of Guam

- Economic rank, by nominal GDP (2007): 150th (one hundred and fiftieth)
- Agriculture in Guam
- Banking in Guam
  - National Bank of Guam
- Communications in Guam
  - Internet in Guam
- Companies of Guam
- Currency of Guam: Dollar
  - ISO 4217: USD
- Energy in Guam
  - Energy policy of Guam
  - Oil industry in Guam
- Mining in Guam
- Tourism in Guam
- Guam Stock Exchange

=== Infrastructure of Guam ===
- Health care in Guam
- Transportation in Guam
  - Airports in Guam
  - Rail transport in Guam
  - Roads in Guam
    - Highways in Guam

== Education in Guam ==
- Education in Guam
  - Schools in Guam
  - Colleges and universities in Guam

== See also ==
- Topic overview:
  - Guam
  - Index of Guam-related articles
