= Familyfriend =

Guamanian restaurant in Seattle, Washington, U.S.

- Interactive map of Familyfriend

Restaurant information
- Established: December 2023
- Owner: Elmer Dulla
- Food type: Guamanian
- Location: 3315 Beacon Avenue S, Seattle, King, Washington, 98144, United States
- Coordinates: 47.5736°N 122.3091°W

Familyfriend is a Guamanian restaurant in Seattle's Beacon Hill neighborhood, in the U.S. state of Washington. Owner Elmer Dulla opened the restaurant in December 2023.

== Description ==
Familyfriend operates in a single-story building on Beacon Avenue, between Horton and Hinds Streets, in Seattle's Beacon Hill neighborhood. The restaurant hosts karaoke.

The menu has included batchoy ramen, bulgogi, chicken adobo, and gollai hagun stewed with coconut milk and turmeric. The restaurant has also served a tostada with seafood salad, corn soup with chili oil, and banana bread with latiya. The corn soup has broth with spiced oil, chicken, scallion, corn, and fried garlic crumbs.

== History ==
The restaurant opened in December 2023. Elmer Dulla is the owner.

== Reception ==
In 2024, The Infatuation's Aimee Rizzo said Familyfriend has Seattle's best smashburger and included the corn soup in an overview of the city's best soup options. She and Kayla Sager-Riley also included Familyfriend in the website's 2024 overviews of fifteen recommended eateries in Beacon Hill and best burgers in Seattle. Familyfriend won in the Best Burger category of Eater Seattle's annual Eater Awards in 2024.
