= Guam Department of Public Works =

Government agency

Agency overview
- Formed: 1952; 74 years ago
- Headquarters: Dipattamenton Che’Cho’ Pupbleko, 542 North Marine Corps Drive, Upper Tumon, Guam 96913
- Employees: 231
- Agency executives: Vincent P. Arriola, Director; Linda J. Ibanez, Deputy director; Ernest G. Candoleta, Jr., Deputy director
- Website: dpw.guam.gov

The Guam Department of Public Works, often abbreviated to DPW, is an agency of the government of Guam that manages public works and transportation in Guam. It receives some of its funding from the U.S. federal government, including the Federal Highway Administration, Office of Insular Affairs, and Department of Defense. In 2025, its budget was USD $157.7 million, with $135.7 million (86.1%) of the money coming from the federal government.

== Operations ==
The department handles the construction and maintenance of highways, and bridges, and government buildings, including public schools. It runs bus services for students and the public, and is responsible for manufacturing and maintaining vehicles needed for its services, including busses and construction vehicles. Additional DPW responsibilities include building inspection, issuance of citations for noncompliant buildings, cleanup of trash and junk vehicles along highways and waterways, road safety infrastructure (such as traffic delineators), and flood prevention. It regularly collaborates with other Guamanian government agencies, such as the Guam Environmental Protection Agency.

As of fiscal year 2023, the department has 231 employees. The director, Vincent P. Arriola, was nominated to the position by Governor Lourdes A. Leon Guerrero and Lieutenant Governor Josh Tenorio, and took office in 2019. There are also two deputy directors, Linda J. Ibanez and Ernest G. Candoleta, Jr.

== History ==
The Guam Department of Public Works was established in 1952, after the Guam Organic Act of 1950 allowed for a government led by civilians. The Department of Public Works' Transportation and Highway Division was created in January 1970 by Governor Carlos Camacho.

== Notable staff ==
- Guamanian politician Joanne M. Brown was director of the DPW from 2011 to 2012.

== See also ==
- Department of transportation – article about this type of government agency
- Guam Regional Transit Authority
- List of airports in Guam
- List of highways in Guam
- List of public works ministries
- Ordot Dump
- Puerto Rico Department of Transportation and Public Works
- Transport in American Samoa
- Transportation in the United States Virgin Islands
