= Culture of Guam =

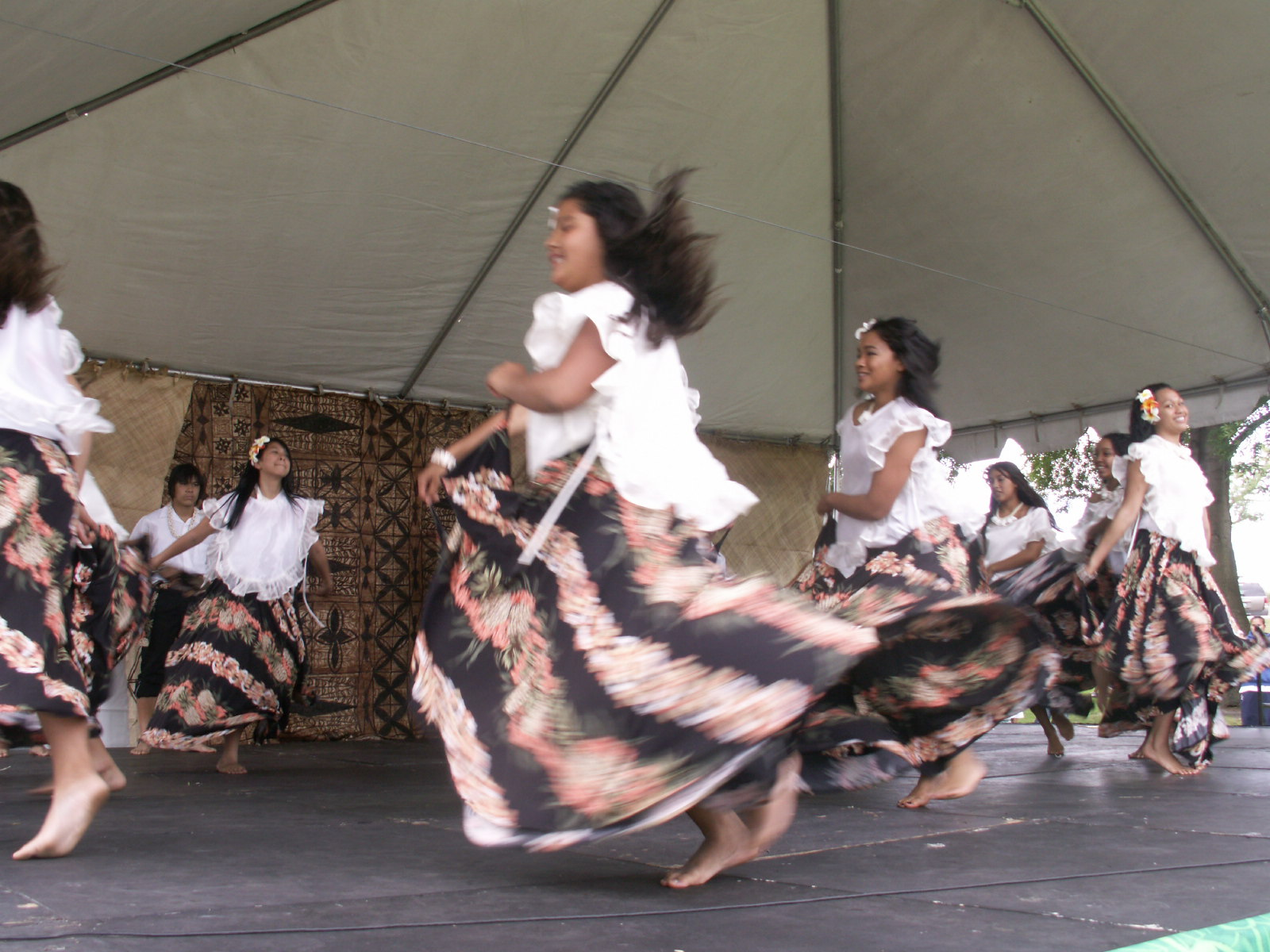
Chamorro dancers

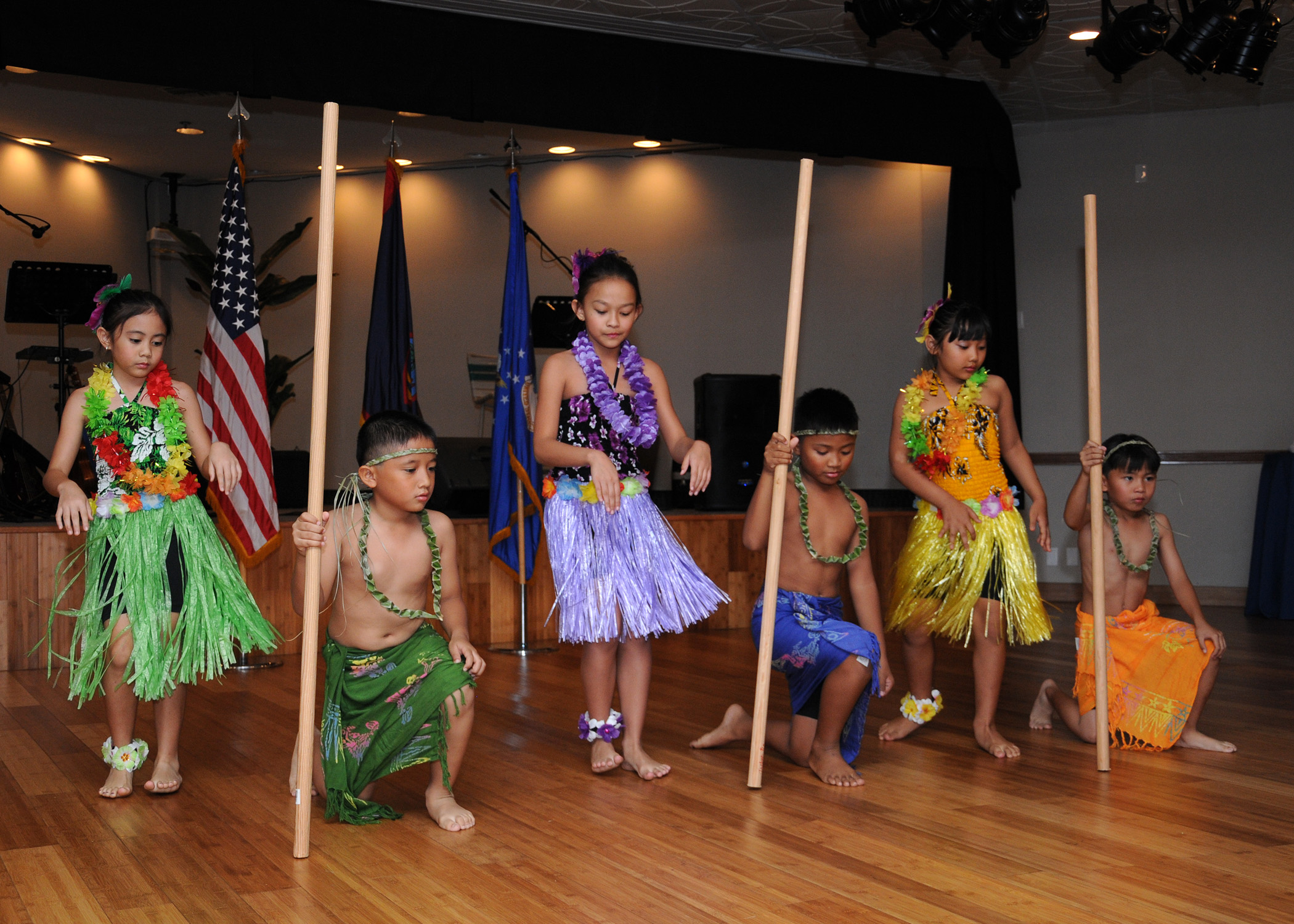
Chamorro dance presentation by school children

The culture of Guam reflects traditional Chamorro customs in a combination of indigenous pre-Hispanic forms, as well as American and Spanish traditions. Post-European-contact Chamoru Guamanian culture is a combination of American, Spanish, Filipino and other Micronesian Islander traditions. Few indigenous pre-Hispanic customs remained following Spanish contact, but include plaiting and pottery, and there has been a resurgence of interest among the CHamoru to preserve the language and culture. Hispanic influences are manifested in the local language, music, dance, sea navigation, cuisine, fishing, games (such as batu, chonka, estuleks, and bayogu), songs and fashion.

== Background and customs ==
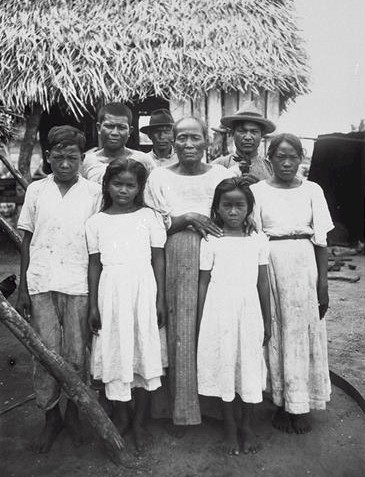
Chamorro people in 1915

The island's original community is of Chamorro natives who have inhabited Guam for almost 4000 years. They had their own language related to the languages of Indonesia and southeast Asia. The Spanish later called them Chamorros, a derivative of the local word Chamurre (meaning of Chamorri is "noble race"). They began to grow rice on the island. The modern CHamoru language has many historical parallels to modern Philippine languages in that it is an Austronesian language which has absorbed much Spanish vocabulary. The language lies within the Malayo-Polynesian languages subgroup, along with such languages as Tagalog, Indonesian, Hawaiian, and Maori. Unlike most other languages of the Pacific Islands, CHamoru does not belong to the Oceanic subgroup of the Austronesian languages. Western people came to the island from the 16th century and wrote about the culture of these people. Many scientists (including ethnologists, doctors, botanists, archeologists) came to Guam from Spain, Russia, France to study from the 1700s, apart from Spanish governors who had written on the local people. Many of their collections are now in the Guam Museum.

=== Dress ===
Early European navigators and missionaries described the aboriginal inhabitants of Guam: the men wore their hair loose or coiled in a knot on top of their heads, though there are also records of men with shaving their heads with the exception of a patch of hair about a finger long, which they left on the crown. Some of them also wore beards. They wore hats called akgak, made out of the leaves of the Pandanus plant. Carrying a carved walking stick was a style among young men. Men were in charge of constructing houses and canoes, fishing, hunting birds, fruit bats and coconut crabs, as well as growing their own crops.

Women's hair was worn very long, often reaching to the ground. Women wore a lower body covering in the form of a small apron-like garment made of the inner bark of trees. They also wore a top called a tifi made out of gunot, while men remained bare-chested due to hot climatic conditions. Women occupied themselves with weaving baskets, mats, and hats of Pandanus leaves, and doing other forms of domestic labor around the house. Women decorated themselves with flowers and belts made of coconut shells as adornments over their skirts, and also wore a head dress made of tortoise shells. In addition to domestic chores, women were also involved in fishing in the reefs and collecting wild breadfruit called dokdok from the forest.

=== Marriage and festivals ===
Before marriage, it was customary for young men to live in concubinage with young women, whom they purchased from their families with gifts. Frequently a number of young men and young women would live together in one large public house, as is also the custom among the Igorot of Luzon. After marriage, a husband was expected to be content with one wife, and a wife with one husband, at a time. Divorces were noted as being frequent, with the children and the household property staying with the wife.

Festivals were celebrated with the men and women collecting in separate groups, forming semi-circles. They would sing and chant their ancestral legends and fables. Sometimes these traditional songs would be sung with treble, contralto, and falsetto singers in a three-part harmony. The songs were accompanied by certain gestures and movements of the body. Women used rattles and castanets made of shells to make music as well.

=== Social customs ===
Two aspects of indigenous pre-Hispanic culture that withstood time are chenchule' and inafa'maolek. Chenchule' is the intricate system of reciprocity at the heart of CHamoru society. It is rooted in the core value of inafa'maolek. Historian Lawrence Cunningham in 1992 attested, "In a Chamorro sense, the land and its produce belong to everyone. Inafa'maolek, or interdependence, is the key, or central value, in CHamoru culture ... Inafa'maolek depends on a spirit of cooperation and sharing. This is the armature, or core, that everything in CHamoru culture revolves around. It is a powerful concern for mutuality rather than individualism and private property rights."

The core culture or Pengngan CHamoru is based on complex social protocol centered upon respect: from sniffing over the hands of the elders (called mangnginge in CHamoru), the passing down of legends, chants, and courtship rituals, to a person asking for permission from spiritual ancestors before entering a jungle or ancient battle grounds. Other practices predating Spanish conquest include galaide' canoe-making, making of the belembaotuyan (a string musical instrument made from a gourd), fashioning of åcho' atupat slings and slingstones, tool manufacture, Måtan Guma' burial rituals, and preparation of herbal medicines by Suruhanu.

== Religion ==
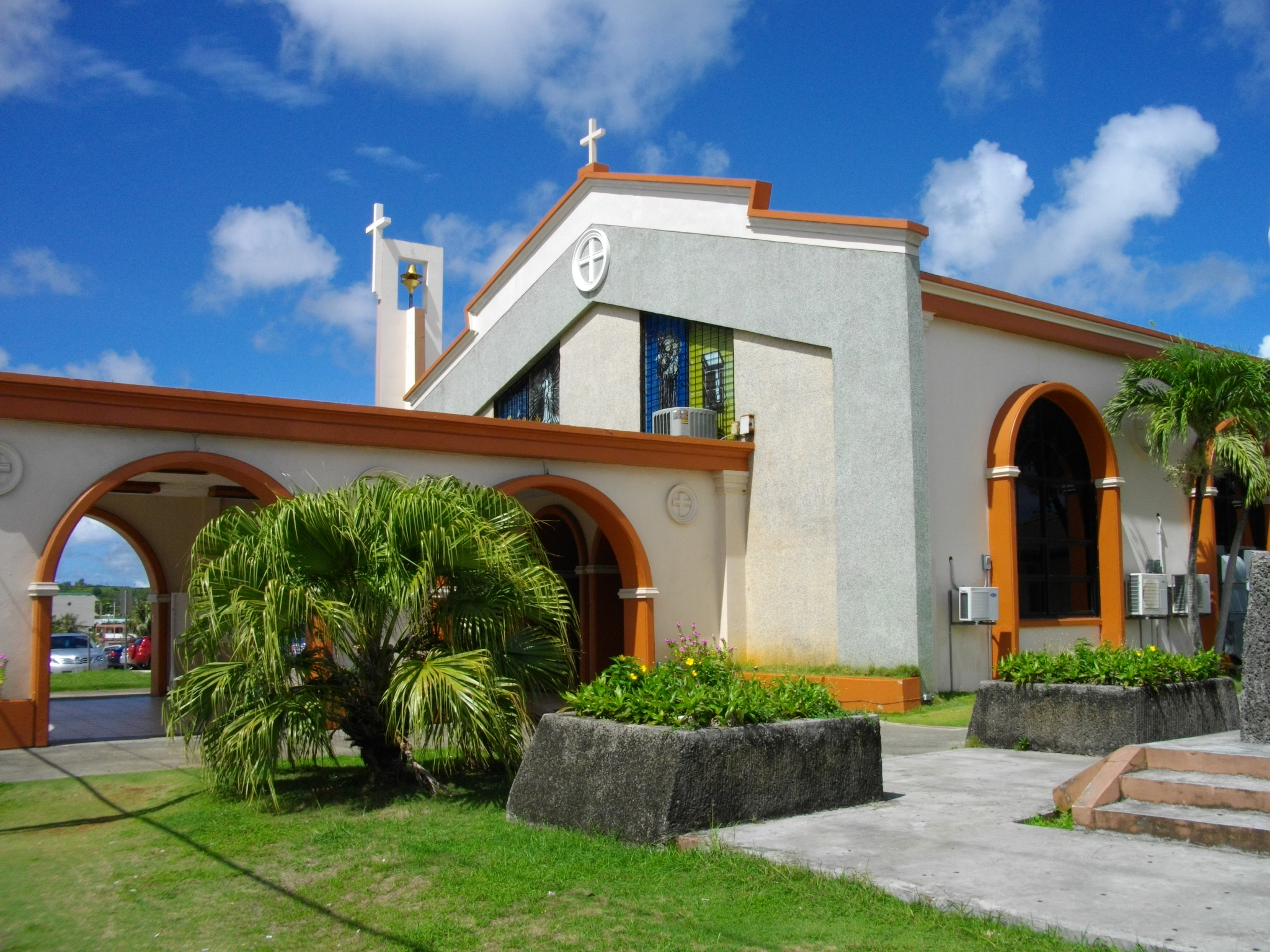
St. Anthony Catholic Church, Guam

Historically, the native people of Guam venerated the bones of their ancestors, keeping the skulls in their houses in small baskets, and practicing incantations before them when it was desired to attain certain objects. The spirits of the dead were called aniti, and were supposed to dwell in the forests, often visiting the villages at certain times, causing bad dreams and having special sway over fisheries. People who died a violent death were said to go afterwards to a place called Zazarraguan. Those dying a more peaceful death were said to have instead gone to a subterranean paradise containing coconut groves and banana plantations, as well as sugar cane and other edible fruits.

During Spanish rule (1668–1898) the majority of the population was converted to Catholicism and religious festivities such as Easter and Christmas became widespread. As with Filipinos, many CHamorus have Spanish surnames, although also like most Filipinos few of the inhabitants are themselves descended from the Spaniards. Instead, Spanish names and surnames became commonplace after their conversion to Catholicism and the historical event of the imposition of the Catálogo alfabético de apellidos in Guam and other territories of the Spanish East Indies, most notably the Philippines. Dominican Sisters, Sisters of the Good Shepherd, Guam Buddhism Society, Muslim Association of Guam, and the Redemptoris Mater Seminary are examples of religious institutions present in modern-day Guam. Ancestral worship is still present. Today in Guam, 98% of Chamorros are Roman Catholic. The Guamanians are religious.

== Cuisine ==
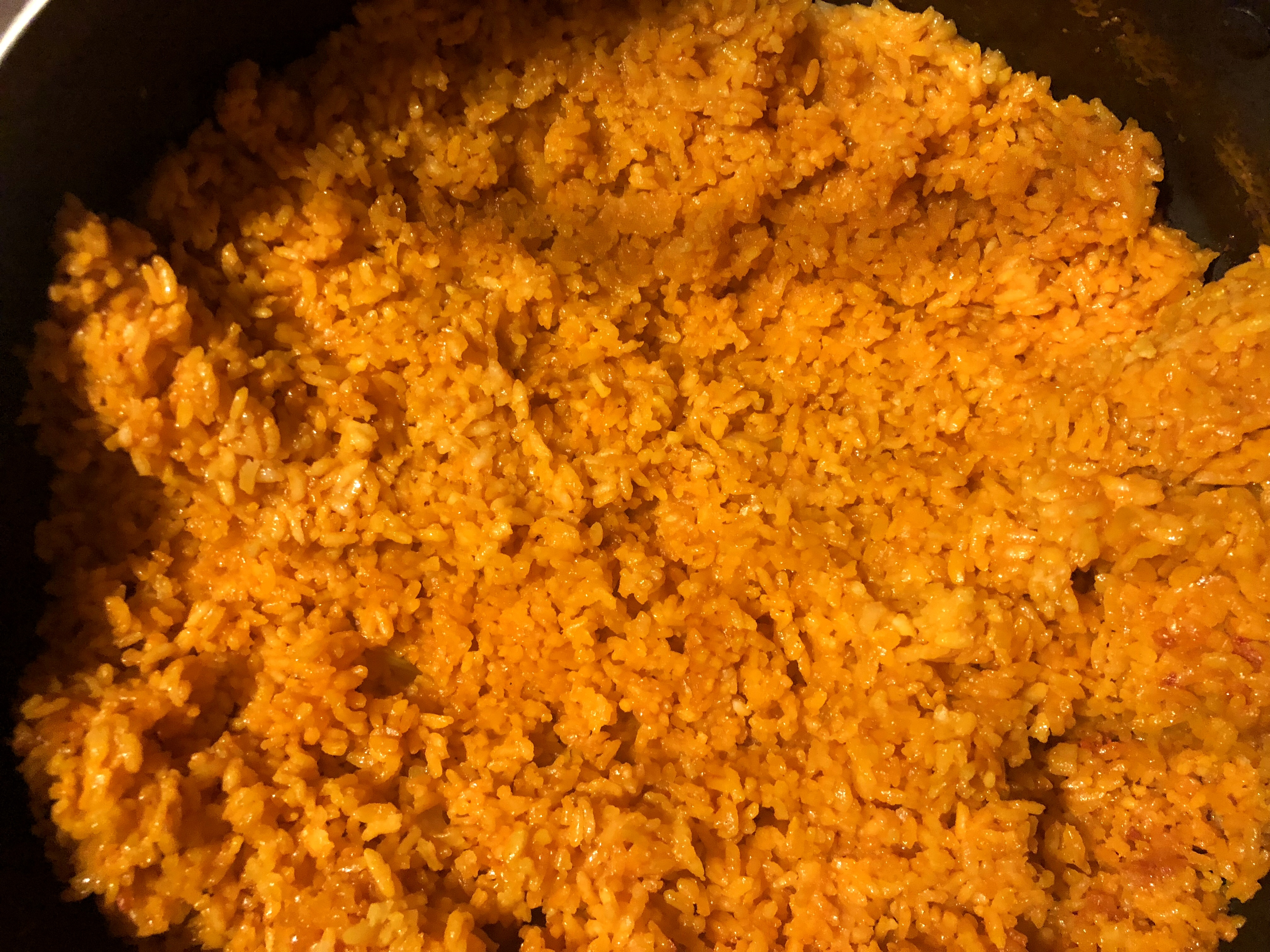
Chamorro red rice

Historically, the diet of the native inhabitants of Guam consisted of fish, fowl, rice, breadfruit, taro, yams, bananas, and coconuts used in a variety of dishes. They traditionally cooked by means of heated stones buried in a pit, much like the method used by many present day Polynesian cultures. The principal crops introduced by European missionaries were maize, tobacco, oranges, lemons, limes, pineapples, cashews, peanuts, eggplant, tomatoes, and several species of Annona, besides a number of leguminous vegetables and garden herbs. Coffee and cacao were introduced later. Post-contact Chamoru cuisine is largely based on corn, and includes tortillas, tamales, atole, and chilaquiles, which are a clear influence from Mesoamerica, principally Mexico, from Spanish trade with Asia.

The modern-day cuisine of Guam is a fusion of that of the indigenous tribes of Chamorro with other Pacific Islanders, Asians and Europeans. Spanish colonialism, which came to the Marianas via Mexico and lasted 200+ years, has had an especially strong influence on the cuisine blended with the present American influence. Some popular dishes include the chorizo breakfast bowl, the Jamaican Grill, red rice as a side dish cooked with the red seeds of the achiote tree, escovitch chicharrón, guyuria, roskette, kalamai, and a Filipino-inspired dessert called the banana lumpia (also known as turon in the Philippines). P. mariannus mariannus (Mariana Fruit Bat) meat is a distinctive feature of traditional Chamorro cuisine. Other notable local ingredients in Guam's cuisine include fresh fish, such as tuna, as well as breadfruit, coconut, papaya, taro, and yams.

== Architecture ==
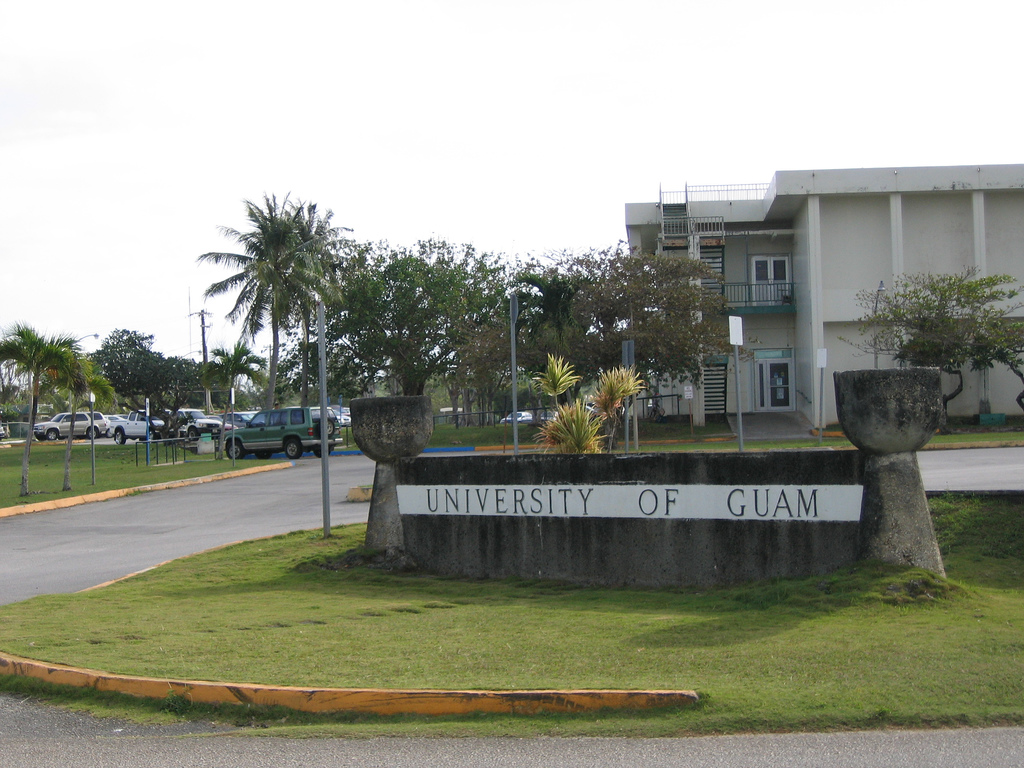
The sign for the University of Guam is flanked by latte stones.

Historically, Chamorro houses were raised on wooden posts or pillars of stone (called latte), and thatched with palm leaves. Their boats were kept in pillar-supported sheds near the water. The latte stones are stone pillars built integral to every house on the Guam island and also in all other Marianas islands. The latte stone houses built length wise were narrow with a rising roof with long rafters. The rafters were extended to the ground level and buried in the ground as a protection against cyclonic winds. Hardwood (of ifil or seeded breadfruit trees or palo maria) formed the main framework of the houses with woven palm leaves covering the sides. The flooring was made of wood from betel nut trees or of split bamboo. Usually the kitchen was made as a separate house. Most of the 180 or so villages in Guam were mostly destroyed during the Spanish-Chamorro war between 1670 and 1695, and only the latte from 20 houses still remain, where remnants of pottery, shell tools and stone are scattered. In modern times the latte stone has become a symbol of Chamorro identity and concrete lattes have been fashioned into new buildings, while actual latte stones can be seen incorporated into residential landscaping.

== Art ==
Master traditional craftsmen and women specialize in weavings, including plaited work (niyok- and åkgak-leaf baskets, mats, bags, hats, and food containments), loom-woven material (kalachucha-hibiscus and banana fiber skirts, belts and burial shrouds), and body ornamentation (bead and shell necklaces, bracelets, earrings, belts, and combs made from tortoise shells and Spondylus).

While only a few masters exist to continue traditional art forms, the resurgence of interest among the CHamoru to preserve the language and culture has resulted in a growing number of young CHamorus who seek to continue the ancient ways of the CHamoru people.

=== Pottery ===
Chamorro pottery is a local ceramic art form which according to archaeological finds dates back more than 3,000 years. Items in the form of domestic kitchen ware were handcrafted with geometric designs with lime impressions. During the Latte Period (800 AD–1521 AD), ceramics were made with red clay mixed with volcanic sand. These were decorated on the surface along the rim but were smaller in size compared to the pre-Latte ware. They were also designed with a round or cone-shaped base with small openings to facilitate cooking. However, during the Spanish colonial rule this traditional craft was discontinued and imported ceramics came to be used instead. In the mid-1960s, the University of Guam has promoted the revival of this form of craft work, and it is now once again a specialized art form of Guam.

=== Painting ===
Painting is a recent practice which has evolved in Guam since the 1980s. Guam International Airport has one of the largest collection of paintings by local artists on display at the arrival and departure gates, as does the business college of the University of Guam. Some of the murals done by painter Sal Bidaure are a two-story level mural on the Bank of Hawaii and another that is done on the concrete retaining wall near the Hilton hotel. Contemporary paintings by many artists are seen in many prominent buildings throughout the island. Some of the well-known contemporary artists are Mark Dell’Isola, Vivian Chargulaf, Monica Baza and Ric R. Castro.

=== Film-making ===
A number of films have been shot on Guam, including Shiro's Head and the government-funded Max Havoc: Curse of the Dragon (2004). Although set on Guam, No Man Is an Island (1962) was not shot there, but instead shot in the Philippines. Likewise, in the 2015 film Pixels, the scene of the first alien attack takes place at Andersen AFB. More recently, a 2020 Netflix film Operation Christmas Drop was also shot on Guam. It is one of the first movies filmed in Guam to receive wide recognition.

== Sports ==
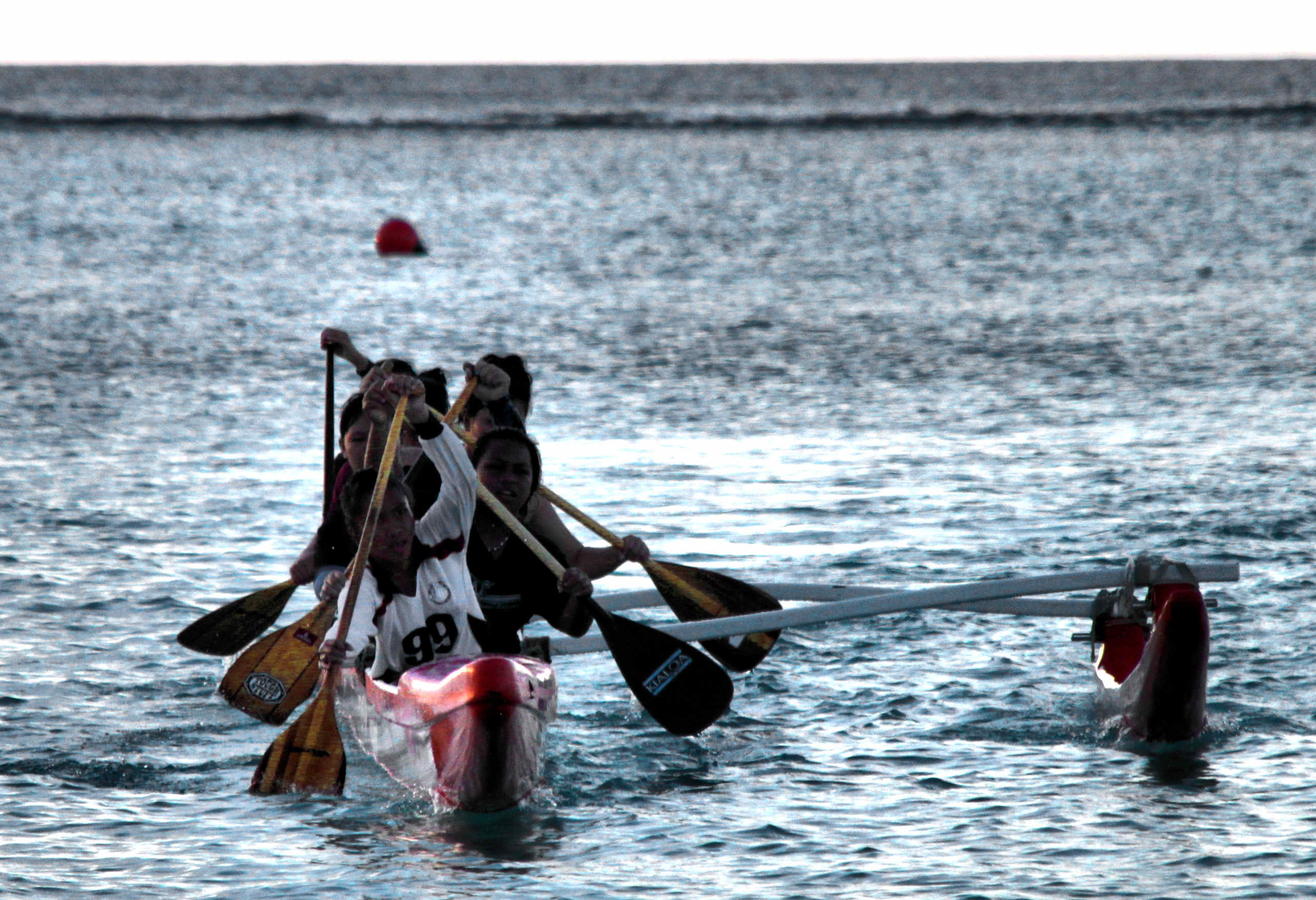
Outrigger canoe team at Tumon

Guam's most popular sport is Soccer, followed by American Football and Baseball respectively. Volleyball and other sports are also somewhat popular.

Guam hosted the Pacific Games in 1975 and 1999. At the 2007 Games, Guam finished 7th of 22 countries and 14th at the 2011 Games.

The Guam men's national basketball team and also the Guam women's national basketball team are traditionally one of the top teams in the Oceania region behind the Australia men's national basketball team and the New Zealand national basketball team. As of 2015, it is the reigning champion of the Pacific Games Basketball Tournament. Guam is home to various basketball organizations, including the Guam Basketball Association.

The Guam national football team was founded in 1975 and joined FIFA in 1996. Guam was once considered one of FIFA's weakest teams, and experienced their first victory over a FIFA-registered side in 2009, when they defeated Mongolia in the East Asian Cup.

The national team plays at the Guam National Football Stadium and are known as the "matao" team. Matao is the definition of highest level or "noble" class. The team did exceptionally well under former head coach Gary White. As of 2017, the Matao is led by Karl Dodd, the current head coach. The top football division in Guam is the Guam Men's Soccer League. Rovers FC and Guam Shipyard are the league's most competitive and successful clubs, both have won nine championships in the past years. Guam entered the 2018 FIFA World Cup qualification Group D. Guam hosted qualifying games on the island for the first time in 2015. During the qualifying round, Guam clinched their first FIFA World Cup Qualifying win by defeating the Turkmenistan national football team. Since then, the team has experienced moderate success in the qualifying round with a record of 2–1–1.

Guam is represented in rugby union by the Guam national rugby union team. The team has never qualified for a Rugby World Cup. Guam played their first match in 2005, an 8–8 draw with the India national rugby union team. Guam's biggest win was a 74–0 defeat of the Brunei national rugby union team in June 2008.

== See also ==
- Music of Guam
