= List of earthquakes in Guam =

Earthquakes in Guam are frequent but are not often accompanied by tsunami. The small island, which is an unincorporated and organized territory of the United States, lies at the extreme southern end of the Mariana Islands and at the eastern margin of the Philippine Sea plate.

Date	Region	Mag.	MMI	Deaths	Injuries	Comments	
April 1825			VIII			Moderate damage / tsunami	NGDC 1972
May 1834						Moderate damage	NGDC 1972
1849-01-25		7.5	IX		Some	Severe damage / tsunami	NGDC 1972
1892-05-16		7.5 M_{s}	VIII			Moderate damage / tsunami	NGDC 1972
1902-09-22		8.1 M_{s}	IX		Few	Severe damage	NGDC 1972
1903-02-10			VII			Minimal damage / tsunami	NGDC 1972
1909-12-09		8.0	VIII			Moderate damage / tsunami	NGDC 1972
1975-11-01		6.1 mb	VII			Minimal damage / tsunami	NGDC 1972
1993-08-08		7.8 M_{w}	IX		48–71	$250 million in damage / non-destructive tsunami	
1997-04-23		6.5 M_{w}	VII		4	Some damage	
2001-10-12		7.0 M_{w}	VII		1	Some damage	
2002-04-26		7.1 M_{w}	VII		5	Minor damage	
Note: The inclusion criteria for adding events are based on WikiProject Earthquakes' notability guideline that was developed for stand alone articles. The principles described also apply to lists. In summary, only damaging, injurious, or deadly events should be recorded.

== See also ==
- Geology of Guam
