= Political party strength in Guam =

Politics in the US territory

The following table indicates the party of elected officials in Guam, an unincorporated territory of the United States:

- Governor
- Lieutenant Governor
- Attorney General

The table also indicates the historical party composition in the:

- Territorial Legislature
- Territory delegation to the United States House of Representatives

For years in which a presidential election was held, the table indicates which party's nominees won the island's presidential straw poll.

== Table ==
Year	Executive offices				Territorial Legislature	Delegate	Presidential straw poll
Year	Governor	Lieutenant Governor	Attorney General	Auditor	Territorial Legislature	Delegate	Presidential straw poll
1951	Carlton Skinner (D) (Note: Appointed by the President of the United States.)	no such office	appointed (Note: The position was established in 1950 as a statutory position filled by gubernatorial appointment. Action by the United States Congress and the government of Guam changed subjected the office to popular election beginning in 2002.)	appointed	Popular Party majority	no such office	no such contest (Note: Presidential straw poll first conducted in 1984.)
1952	Carlton Skinner (D)	no such office	appointed	appointed	Popular Party majority	no such office	no such contest
1953	Ford Quint Elvidge (R)	no such office	appointed	appointed	Popular Party majority	no such office	no such contest
1954	Ford Quint Elvidge (R)	no such office	appointed	appointed	Popular Party majority	no such office	no such contest
1955	Ford Quint Elvidge (R)	no such office	appointed	appointed	Popular Party majority	no such office	no such contest
1956	Ford Quint Elvidge (R)	no such office	appointed	appointed	Popular Party majority	no such office	no such contest
1957	Richard Barrett Lowe (R)	no such office	appointed	appointed	Popular Party majority	no such office	no such contest
1958	Richard Barrett Lowe (R)	no such office	appointed	appointed	Popular Party majority	no such office	no such contest
1959	Richard Barrett Lowe (R)	no such office	appointed	appointed	Popular Party majority	no such office	no such contest
1960	Joseph Flores (R)	no such office	appointed	appointed	Popular Party majority	no such office	no such contest
1961	Bill Daniel (D)	no such office	appointed	appointed	Popular Party majority	no such office	no such contest
1962	Bill Daniel (D)	no such office	appointed	appointed	Popular Party majority	no such office	no such contest
1963	Manuel Flores Leon; Guerrero (D)	no such office	appointed	appointed	Popular Party majority	no such office	no such contest
1964	Manuel Flores Leon; Guerrero (D)	no such office	appointed	appointed	Popular Party majority	no such office	no such contest
1965	Manuel Flores Leon; Guerrero (D)	no such office	appointed	appointed	Territorial Party majority	no such office	no such contest
1966	Manuel Flores Leon; Guerrero (D)	no such office	appointed	appointed	Territorial Party majority	no such office	no such contest
1967	Manuel Flores Leon; Guerrero (D)	no such office	appointed	appointed	D majority	no such office	no such contest
1968	Manuel Flores Leon; Guerrero (D)	no such office	appointed	appointed	D majority	no such office	no such contest
1969	Carlos Camacho (R)	no such office	appointed	appointed	D majority	no such office	no such contest
1970	Carlos Camacho (R)	no such office	appointed	appointed	D majority	no such office	no such contest
1971	Carlos Camacho (R)	Kurt Moylan (R)	appointed	appointed	D majority	no such office	no such contest
1972	Carlos Camacho (R)	Kurt Moylan (R)	appointed	appointed	D majority	no such office	no such contest
1973	Carlos Camacho (R)	Kurt Moylan (R)	appointed	appointed	D majority	Antonio Borja Won Pat (D)	no such contest
1974	Carlos Camacho (R)	Kurt Moylan (R)	appointed	appointed	D majority	Antonio Borja Won Pat (D)	no such contest
1975	Ricardo Bordallo (D)	Rudy Sablan (D)	appointed	appointed	R majority	Antonio Borja Won Pat (D)	no such contest
1976	Ricardo Bordallo (D)	Rudy Sablan (D)	appointed	appointed	R majority	Antonio Borja Won Pat (D)	no such contest
1977	Ricardo Bordallo (D)	Rudy Sablan (D)	appointed	appointed	R majority	Antonio Borja Won Pat (D)	no such contest
1978	Ricardo Bordallo (D)	Rudy Sablan (D)	appointed	appointed	R majority	Antonio Borja Won Pat (D)	no such contest
1979	Paul McDonald Calvo (R)	Joseph Franklin Ada (R)	appointed	appointed	R majority	Antonio Borja Won Pat (D)	no such contest
1980	Paul McDonald Calvo (R)	Joseph Franklin Ada (R)	appointed	appointed	R majority	Antonio Borja Won Pat (D)	Jimmy Carter/ Walter Mondale (D) ✗
1981	Paul McDonald Calvo (R)	Joseph Franklin Ada (R)	appointed	appointed	R majority	Antonio Borja Won Pat (D)	Jimmy Carter/ Walter Mondale (D) ✗
1982	Paul McDonald Calvo (R)	Joseph Franklin Ada (R)	appointed	appointed	R majority	Antonio Borja Won Pat (D)	Jimmy Carter/ Walter Mondale (D) ✗
1983	Ricardo Bordallo (D)	Edward Diego Reyes (D)	appointed	appointed	D majority	Antonio Borja Won Pat (D)	Jimmy Carter/ Walter Mondale (D) ✗
1984	Ricardo Bordallo (D)	Edward Diego Reyes (D)	appointed	appointed	D majority	Antonio Borja Won Pat (D)	Ronald Reagan/ George H. W. Bush (R) ✓
1985	Ricardo Bordallo (D)	Edward Diego Reyes (D)	appointed	appointed	D majority	Vicente T. Blaz (R)	Ronald Reagan/ George H. W. Bush (R) ✓
1986	Ricardo Bordallo (D)	Edward Diego Reyes (D)	appointed	appointed	D majority	Vicente T. Blaz (R)	Ronald Reagan/ George H. W. Bush (R) ✓
1987	Joseph Franklin Ada (R)	Frank Blas (R)	appointed	appointed	D majority	Vicente T. Blaz (R)	Ronald Reagan/ George H. W. Bush (R) ✓
1988	Joseph Franklin Ada (R)	Frank Blas (R)	appointed	appointed	D majority	Vicente T. Blaz (R)	George H. W. Bush/ Dan Quayle (R) ✓
1989	Joseph Franklin Ada (R)	Frank Blas (R)	appointed	appointed	D majority	Vicente T. Blaz (R)	George H. W. Bush/ Dan Quayle (R) ✓
1990	Joseph Franklin Ada (R)	Frank Blas (R)	appointed	appointed	D majority	Vicente T. Blaz (R)	George H. W. Bush/ Dan Quayle (R) ✓
1991	Joseph Franklin Ada (R)	Frank Blas (R)	appointed	appointed	D majority	Vicente T. Blaz (R)	George H. W. Bush/ Dan Quayle (R) ✓
1992	Joseph Franklin Ada (R)	Frank Blas (R)	appointed	appointed	D majority	Vicente T. Blaz (R)	Bill Clinton/ Al Gore (D) ✓
1993	Joseph Franklin Ada (R)	Frank Blas (R)	appointed	appointed	D majority	Robert A. Underwood (D)	Bill Clinton/ Al Gore (D) ✓
1994	Joseph Franklin Ada (R)	Frank Blas (R)	appointed	appointed	D majority	Robert A. Underwood (D)	Bill Clinton/ Al Gore (D) ✓
1995	Carl Gutierrez (D)	Madeleine Bordallo (D)	appointed	appointed	D majority	Robert A. Underwood (D)	Bill Clinton/ Al Gore (D) ✓
1996	Carl Gutierrez (D)	Madeleine Bordallo (D)	appointed	appointed	D majority	Robert A. Underwood (D)	Bill Clinton/ Al Gore (D) ✓
1997	Carl Gutierrez (D)	Madeleine Bordallo (D)	appointed	appointed	R majority	Robert A. Underwood (D)	Bill Clinton/ Al Gore (D) ✓
1998	Carl Gutierrez (D)	Madeleine Bordallo (D)	appointed	appointed	R majority	Robert A. Underwood (D)	Bill Clinton/ Al Gore (D) ✓
1999	Carl Gutierrez (D)	Madeleine Bordallo (D)	appointed	appointed	10R, 5D	Robert A. Underwood (D)	Bill Clinton/ Al Gore (D) ✓
2000	Carl Gutierrez (D)	Madeleine Bordallo (D)	appointed	Doris Flores; Brooks (R)	10R, 5D	Robert A. Underwood (D)	George W. Bush/ Dick Cheney (R) ✓
2001	Carl Gutierrez (D)	Madeleine Bordallo (D)	appointed	Doris Flores; Brooks (R)	8R, 7D	Robert A. Underwood (D)	George W. Bush/ Dick Cheney (R) ✓
2002	Carl Gutierrez (D)	Madeleine Bordallo (D)	appointed	Doris Flores; Brooks (R)	8R, 7D	Robert A. Underwood (D)	George W. Bush/ Dick Cheney (R) ✓
2003	Felix Perez Camacho (R)	Kaleo Moylan (R)	Douglas Moylan (R)	Doris Flores; Brooks (R)	9D, 6R	Madeleine Bordallo (D)	George W. Bush/ Dick Cheney (R) ✓
2004	Felix Perez Camacho (R)	Kaleo Moylan (R)	Douglas Moylan (R)	Doris Flores; Brooks (R)	9D, 6R	Madeleine Bordallo (D)	George W. Bush/ Dick Cheney (R) ✓
2005	Felix Perez Camacho (R)	Kaleo Moylan (R)	Douglas Moylan (R)	Doris Flores; Brooks (R)	9R, 6D	Madeleine Bordallo (D)	George W. Bush/ Dick Cheney (R) ✓
2006	Felix Perez Camacho (R)	Kaleo Moylan (R)	Douglas Moylan (R)	Doris Flores; Brooks (R)	9R, 6D	Madeleine Bordallo (D)	George W. Bush/ Dick Cheney (R) ✓
2007	Felix Perez Camacho (R)	Michael Cruz (R)	Alicia Limtiaco (D)	Doris Flores; Brooks (R)	8R, 7D	Madeleine Bordallo (D)	George W. Bush/ Dick Cheney (R) ✓
2007	Felix Perez Camacho (R)	Michael Cruz (R)	Alicia Limtiaco (D)	Doris Flores; Brooks (R)	7R, 7D	Madeleine Bordallo (D)	George W. Bush/ Dick Cheney (R) ✓
2008	Felix Perez Camacho (R)	Michael Cruz (R)	Alicia Limtiaco (D)	Doris Flores; Brooks (R)	7R, 7D	Madeleine Bordallo (D)	Barack Obama/ Joe Biden (D) ✓
2008	Felix Perez Camacho (R)	Michael Cruz (R)	Alicia Limtiaco (D)	Doris Flores; Brooks (R)	8D, 7R	Madeleine Bordallo (D)	Barack Obama/ Joe Biden (D) ✓
2009	Felix Perez Camacho (R)	Michael Cruz (R)	Alicia Limtiaco (D)	Doris Flores; Brooks (R)	10D, 5R	Madeleine Bordallo (D)	Barack Obama/ Joe Biden (D) ✓
2010	Felix Perez Camacho (R)	Michael Cruz (R)	Alicia Limtiaco (D)	Doris Flores; Brooks (R)	9D, 6R (Note: Republican Tony Ada won a special election in March 2010 following the resignation of Democrat Matt Rector.)	Madeleine Bordallo (D)	Barack Obama/ Joe Biden (D) ✓
2011	Eddie Baza Calvo (R)	Ray Tenorio (R)	Leonardo Rapadas (R)	Doris Flores; Brooks (R)	9D, 6R	Madeleine Bordallo (D)	Barack Obama/ Joe Biden (D) ✓
2012	Eddie Baza Calvo (R)	Ray Tenorio (R)	Leonardo Rapadas (R)	Doris Flores; Brooks (R)	9D, 6R	Madeleine Bordallo (D)	Barack Obama/ Joe Biden (D) ✓
2013	Eddie Baza Calvo (R)	Ray Tenorio (R)	Leonardo Rapadas (R)	Doris Flores; Brooks (R)	9D, 6R	Madeleine Bordallo (D)	Barack Obama/ Joe Biden (D) ✓
2014	Eddie Baza Calvo (R)	Ray Tenorio (R)	Leonardo Rapadas (R)	Doris Flores; Brooks (R)	9D, 6R	Madeleine Bordallo (D)	Barack Obama/ Joe Biden (D) ✓
2015	Eddie Baza Calvo (R)	Ray Tenorio (R)	Elizabeth; Barrett-Anderson (R)	Doris Flores; Brooks (R)	9D, 6R	Madeleine Bordallo (D)	Barack Obama/ Joe Biden (D) ✓
2016	Eddie Baza Calvo (R)	Ray Tenorio (R)	Elizabeth; Barrett-Anderson (R)	Doris Flores; Brooks (R)	9D, 6R	Madeleine Bordallo (D)	Hillary Clinton/ Tim Kaine (D) ✗
2017	Eddie Baza Calvo (R)	Ray Tenorio (R)	Elizabeth; Barrett-Anderson (R)	Doris Flores; Brooks (R)	9D, 6R	Madeleine Bordallo (D)	Hillary Clinton/ Tim Kaine (D) ✗
2018	Eddie Baza Calvo (R)	Ray Tenorio (R)	Elizabeth; Barrett-Anderson (R)	Benjamin Cruz (D)	9D, 6R	Madeleine Bordallo (D)	Hillary Clinton/ Tim Kaine (D) ✗
2019	Lou Leon Guerrero (D)	Josh Tenorio (D)	Leevin Camacho (NP)	Benjamin Cruz (D)	10D, 5R	Michael San Nicolas (D)	Hillary Clinton/ Tim Kaine (D) ✗
2020	Lou Leon Guerrero (D)	Josh Tenorio (D)	Leevin Camacho (NP)	Benjamin Cruz (D)	10D, 5R	Michael San Nicolas (D)	Joe Biden/ Kamala Harris (D) ✓
2021	Lou Leon Guerrero (D)	Josh Tenorio (D)	Leevin Camacho (NP)	Benjamin Cruz (D)	8D, 7R	Michael San Nicolas (D)	Joe Biden/ Kamala Harris (D) ✓
2022	Lou Leon Guerrero (D)	Josh Tenorio (D)	Leevin Camacho (NP)	Benjamin Cruz (D)	8D, 7R	Michael San Nicolas (D)	Joe Biden/ Kamala Harris (D) ✓
2023	Lou Leon Guerrero (D)	Josh Tenorio (D)	Douglas Moylan (R)	Benjamin Cruz (D)	9D, 6R	James Moylan (R)	Joe Biden/ Kamala Harris (D) ✓
2024	Lou Leon Guerrero (D)	Josh Tenorio (D)	Douglas Moylan (R)	Benjamin Cruz (D)	9D, 6R	James Moylan (R)	Kamala Harris/ Tim Walz (D) ✗
2025	Lou Leon Guerrero (D)	Josh Tenorio (D)	Douglas Moylan (R)	Benjamin Cruz (D)	9R, 6D	James Moylan (R)	Kamala Harris/ Tim Walz (D) ✗
2026	Lou Leon Guerrero (D)	Josh Tenorio (D)	Douglas Moylan (R)	Benjamin Cruz (D)	9R, 6D	James Moylan (R)	Kamala Harris/ Tim Walz (D) ✗

Key to party colors and abbreviations for members of the U.S. Congress and other politicians or officials
Alaskan Independence (AKIP) Know Nothing (KN) American Labor (AL) Anti-Jacksonian (Anti-J); National Republican (NR) Anti-Administration (AA) Anti-Masonic (Anti-M) Conservative (Con) Covenant (Cov)	Democratic (D) Democratic–Farmer–Labor (DFL) Democratic–NPL (D-NPL) Dixiecrat (Dix), States' Rights (SR) Democratic-Republican (DR) Farmer–Labor (FL) Federalist (F); Pro-Administration (PA)	Free Soil (FS) Fusion (Fus) Greenback (GB) Independence (IPM) Jacksonian (J) Liberal (Lib) Libertarian (L) National Union (NU)	Nonpartisan League (NPL) Nullifier (N) Opposition Northern (O); Opposition Southern (O) Populist (Pop) Progressive (Prog) Prohibition (Proh) Readjuster (Rea)	Republican (R) Silver (Sv) Silver Republican (SvR) Socialist (Soc) Union (U) Unconditional Union (UU) Vermont Progressive (VP) Whig (W)	Independent (I) Nonpartisan (NP)

== See also ==
- Elections in Guam
- Government and politics in Guam
- List of political parties in Guam
- Politics of Guam
