= Kantan Chamorrita =

Kantan Chamorrita is an ancient style of improvised rhyming "debate" indigenous to the Chamoru natives of the Mariana Islands, comparable to modern-day "battle rapping" or poetry slams.

== See also ==
- Music of Guam
