= Guam Environmental Protection Agency =

- Guam EPA; Ahensian Pruteksion Lina'La Guahan
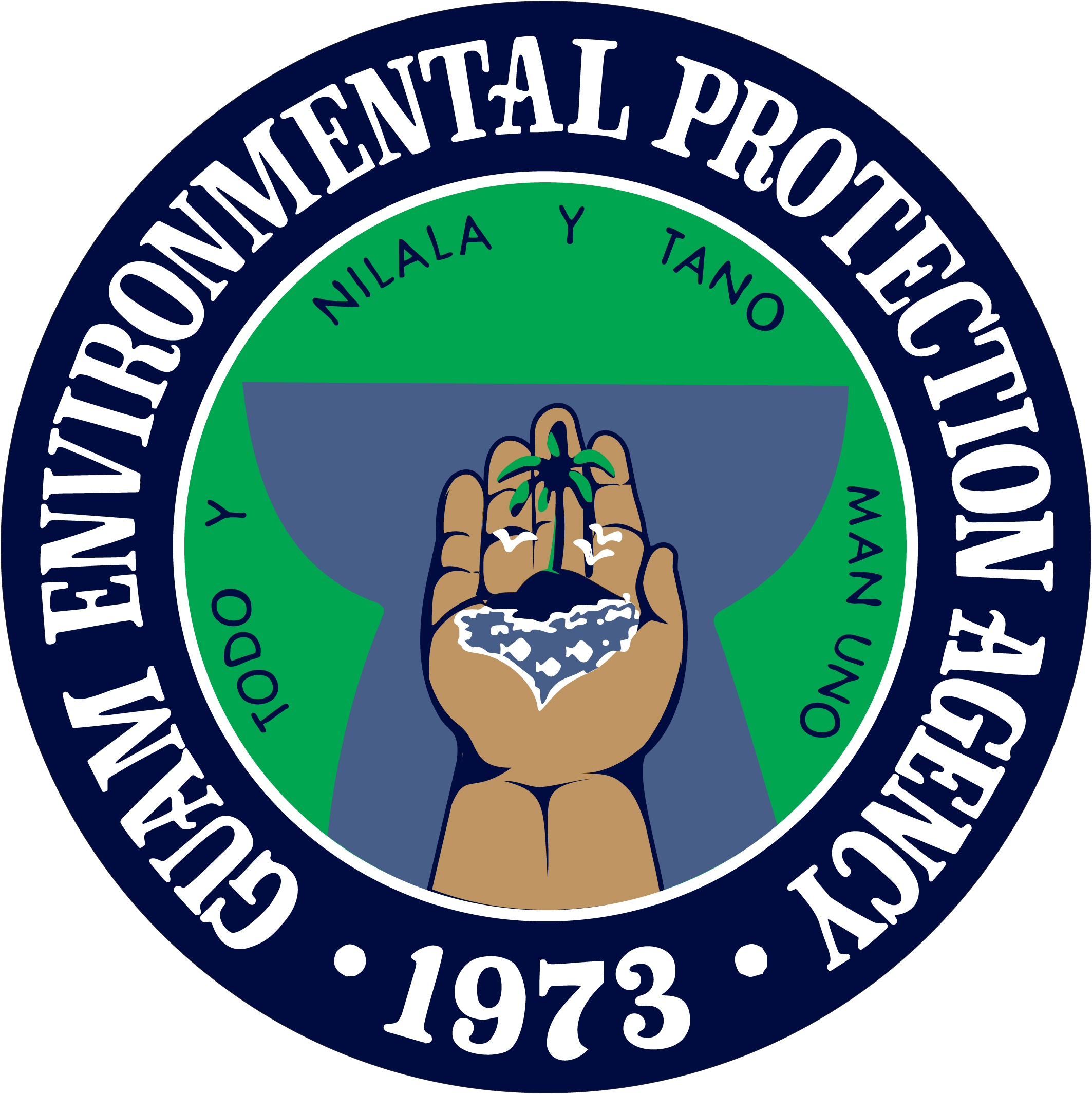
- Official seal of the Environmental Protection Agency

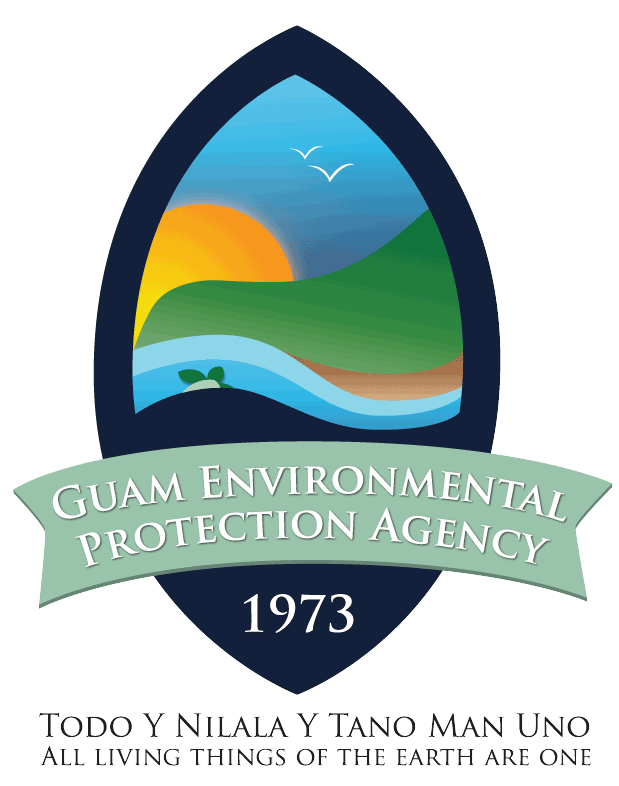
- Official logo of the Guam Environmental Protection Agency

Agency overview
- Formed: December 7, 1972
- Employees: 52
- Website: epa.guam.gov

The Guam Environmental Protection Agency (Guam EPA, Chamorro: Ahensian Pruteksion Lina'La Guahan) is a government agency of the United States territory of Guam.

== History ==
Acting Gov. Kurt S. Moylan Signed Public Law 11-191 on Dec. 7, 1972 that enabled the creation of the Guam Environmental Protection Agency. The Public Law gave responsibilities once given to different agencies and commissions to the newly formed Guam EPA. On March 3, the following year, Guam EPA officially started work and took up residence at the Harmon Plaza. In 1995 the Agency moved from the Harmon Industrial Park to Tiyan Barrigada. The building was available after the Department of Defense returned properties that were part of the former Naval Air Station (NAS) Guam to the Government of Guam.

== Policy and Purpose ==
The public law creating Guam EPA states, "It is hereby declared to be the public policy of this Territory of Guam that a high quality environment be maintained at all times to guarantee an enjoyable life for all people at present and in the future, and that environmental degreadtion of the quality of land, water and air by any pollutants, including all physical, chemical and biological agents, should not be allowed. To these ends, it is the purpose of this Act to provide a united, integrated and comprehensive territory-wide program of environmental protection and to provide a framework to fulfill that task."

After the Agency was created, the 12th Guam Legislature continued the work to restructure some of the Government Code of Guam and place environmental laws in an organized manner in Title X.

Guam EPA's Administration Office and Operations Building are located on Mariner Ave. in Tiyan, Barrigada.

== Divisions and Programs ==
Guam EPA has four divisions and a management section. Each division has at least two programs within.

The four divisions and their programs include:

- Administrative Services Division (ASD): personnel and procurement
- Air and Land Division: pesticide enforcement, hazardous waste management, solid waste management and air pollution control
- Environmental Monitoring and Analytical Services Division (EMAS): monitoring and analytical services
- Water Division: water resources management, water pollution control and safe drinking water

== Related legislation ==
Guam EPA has legal authority is found primarily in volume 10 of the Guam Code Annotated.

=== Laws ===
- Chapter 45 – Guam Environmental Protection Agency Act
- Chapter 46 - Water Resources Conservation Act
  - States that the right to water or the use of water from the surface and underground sources shall not exceed the needs of the public and private lands of Guam. Outlines the requirement for Well Driller’s Licenses, Drilling Permits and Operating Permits. Outlaws wasteful discharge from wells Outlines the Technical Advisory Committee for groundwater management and creates the Water Research and Development Fund
- Chapter 47 – Water Pollution Control Act
  - Authorizes Guam EPA to study ground water and potential pollution sources. Requires creation of a standard for water purity and classification according to the most beneficial uses of water. Authorizes Guam EPA to receive complaints regarding water pollution, investigate the investigations and hold necessary hearings. Gives Guam EPA authority to order a stop to actions that pollute water and examine all plans for sewer systems and discharges. Makes improper sewer systems illegal. Designates a Groundwater Protection Zone. Sets penalties for those who violate the law.
- Chapter 48 - Toilet Facilities and Sewage Disposal Act
  - Outlines the types of toilets and sewage facilities. Requires the approval of the Administrator for construction of any toilet or sewage facilities. Mandates that septic tanks and leaching systems have to be more than 300 feet of any river, creek, pond or stream. Establishes the Public Utility Agency Wastewater Fund.
- Chapter 49 – Air Pollution Control Act
  - Aims to coordinate prevention and control of air pollution in Guam. Directs Guam EPA to establish ambient air quality standards for Guam, and consult with those constructing or operating any air pollution source. Instructs the Agency to implement, maintain and enforce standards established by the Clean Air Act. Requires any owner or operator of an air pollution source to maintain records, draft reports, sample emissions and other monitoring procedures. Establishes the Air Pollution Control Permit Program and the Air Pollution Control Special Fund. Give the Administrator the ability to declare, with the governor, an emergency if air pollution is causing imminent danger to human health or safety. Outlines the Motor Vehicle Pollution Control section that allows inspection of vehicle emissions
- Chapter 50 - Guam Pesticides Act
  - Defines a pesticide as a substance that intends to prevent, destroy, repel, kill, or mitigate any pest. Requires a Notice of Arrival for any pesticide being imported to Guam. Outlines Experimental Use Permits and their use. Requires those selling pesticides to be licensed. Makes proper labeling on pesticides required. This law also makes altered or misbranded pesticides illegal. Gives the Administrator the ability to ban pesticides if it’s deemed necessary.
- Chapter 51 – Solid Waste
  - Requires GovGuam to create a Solid Waste Management Plan and DPW to implement the Plan as regulated by Guam EPA. The Act gives Guam EPA authority to regulate the transportation, processing, storage, treatment and disposal of hazardous waste. Outlines the difference between hazardous waste and solid waste by referencing federal law. Gives GovGuam the ability to enter into contracts with private entities to fulfill mandates of the Solid Waste Management Plan. Requires that every permit application will include proof of financial assurance to ensure there are resources available to handle a potential cleanup if needed. Outlines how to issue a permit for any solid waste activity and requires Guam EPA to publish notice of intent to issue the permit. Gives the Administrator the authority to suspend, revoke, condition, modify or terminate any permit issued by the Agency. Authorizes the Agency to enter private or public property to inspect or investigate conditions relating to solid or hazardous waste. The law also makes it a misdemeanor for anyone to interfere with inspections. Makes it illegal to place solid waste upon the highways or on public or private property. Requires anyone hauling solid waste in a vehicle to properly secure the waste from falling onto the road. Makes burning trash, except in a facility approved by the Administrator, illegal. Outlines the litter citation program including the fact that citations can be issued by designated individuals from the Department of Parks and Recreation, the Department of Agriculture, Guam EPA, the Department of Public Health and Social Services, the Department of Public Works, all village mayors and assistant mayors and Guam Police Department officers. States that any person who witnesses the throwing of trash from a vehicle or water craft, can report the date, time and location of the littering and license registration number to officers. The registration number is considered “prima facie” evidence that the littering was being done by the person who has the registration for the vehicle.
- Chapter 52 – Water and Wastewater Operator’s Mandatory Certification Act
  - Requires any personnel of public or private potable water supply systems or waste water facilities to be certified. The certification is meant to ensure the operators are competent to supervise the operation of such systems. Authorizes the Administrator to issue certifications for qualified individuals to operate potable water supply and waste water systems. Outlines civil and criminal penalties for those who attempt to operate any potable water supply or waste water system without certification.
- Chapter 53 – Safe Drinking Water Act
  - Authorizes Guam EPA to perform all acts necessary to carry out the Act, including participating in training programs, receiving financial and technical assistance from the Federal Government, and establishing and collecting fees for conducting reviews, inspections and lab analysis. Gives Guam EPA the authority to make inspections necessary to ensure compliance with this Act. Sets Drinking Water Standards in which maximum contaminant levels for primary drinking water should be at a level which no known or anticipated adverse effects on human health occur and allow an adequate margin of safety. Also requires Guam’s secondary drinking water regulations to be at least as stringent in terms of contaminant level as the national secondary drinking water regulations. Gives Guam EPA the authority to make and enforce regulations regarding cross-connection and back flow prevention controls. Requires all laboratories performing tests and analysis required for public water systems, have a certificate issued by Guam EPA that the lab is competent to conduct such tests. If the Administrator determines there is substantial danger to the public, the Agency is authorized to issue a necessary order to protect the health of people using the water system. Requires the Agency to develop a plan for safe drinking water under emergency circumstances.
- Chapter 53A – Safe Drinking Water Fund
- Chapter 76 – Storage of Hazardous Materials (USTs)
  - Identifies underground storage tanks (USTs) used to store regulated substances are potential sources of contamination of the ground, ground water, marine waters and possibly pose other dangers to public health and the environment. Establishes a program to prevent contamination from USTs. Establishes an orderly procedure to constructing and maintaining USTs to meet standards. Designates Guam EPA as Guam’s official representative of Subtitle I of the Resource Conservation and Recovery Act (RCRA). Requires owners or operators of USTs to maintain systems to identify releases and maintain records about the tank. Also requires the operator to notify Guam EPA about any releases. Authorizes the Agency to stop a release from a UST if the owner or operator does not take immediate action to stop the release.
- Chapter 90 – Clean Indoor Air Act

== See also ==
- Government of Guam
