= Geology of Guam =

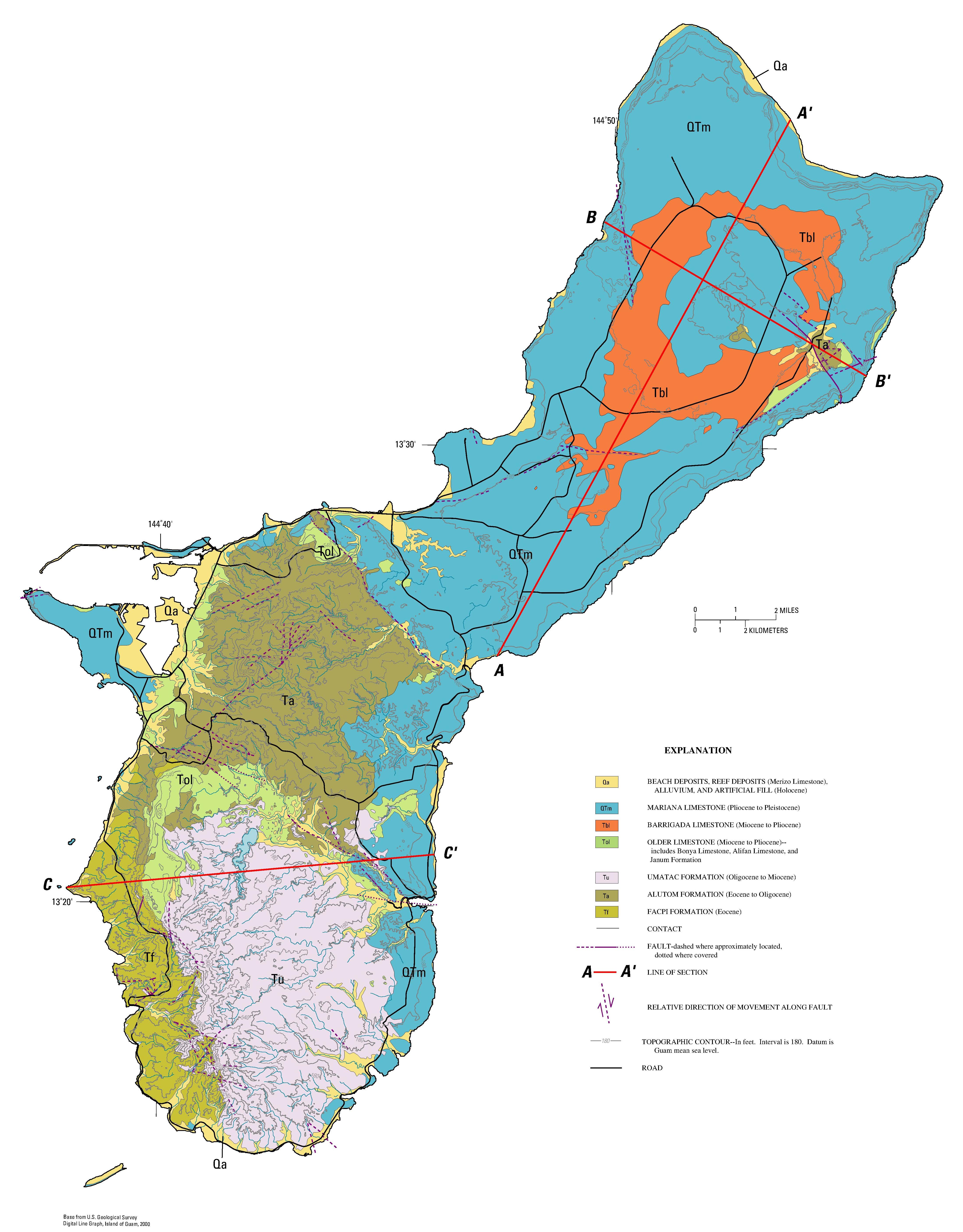
Geologic map of Guam

The geology of Guam formed as a result of mafic, felsic and intermediate composition volcanic rocks erupting below the ocean, building up the base of the island in the Eocene, between 33.9 and 56 million years ago. The island emerged above the water in the Eocene, although the volcanic crater collapsed. A second volcanic crater formed on the south of the island in the Oligocene and Miocene. In the shallow water, numerous limestone formations took shape, with thick alternating layers of volcanic material. The second crater collapsed and Guam went through a period in which it was almost entirely submerged, resembling a swampy atoll, until structural deformation slowly uplifted different parts of the island to their present topography. The process of uplift led to widespread erosion and clay formation, as well as the deposition of different types of limestone, reflecting different water depths.

== Stratigraphy and geologic history ==
Guam began to form in the late middle Eocene with the development of the Facpi Formation. The Facpi Formation was associated with submarine volcanism, evidenced by pillow basalt in flow rocks from that series. The Facpi Formation forms the basement volcanic rock of Guam and was deposited when the island was formed in close proximity to the Palau-Kyushu Ridge.

The second major volcanic episode is associated with the Alutom Formation which was formed in the late Eocene. The formation contains basalt and andesite, as well as volcanic breccia with component dacite pebbles and cobbles and tuff shale cemented together with calcite. The presence of the dacite pebbles and correlation with dacitic lava flows on Saipan, dacite flows likely preceded andesite eruptions on Guam. Although the Alutom Formation does not contain many carbonates besides the calcite, the presence of limestone fragments in upper units suggests that limestone formations existed close by. Stabile shallow water reef-forming environments by the end of the Eocene gave way to violent volcanic eruptions in the Oligocene. The island's central caldera collapsed as a result of uplift and faulting.

In the Oligocene, the Tenjo structural block formed as Eocene volcano eroded.

=== Miocene (23.3-5.3 million years ago) ===
A spur of Alutom volcanic rocks forms the Mount Alifan-Mount Lamlam ridge was surrounded on all sides by major lava flows in the early Miocene that formed the Umatac Formation. The formation was first dated using foraminifera fossils in a layer of limestone. Pyroclastic breccias and conglomerates formed in conjunction with the new eruptions.

Eruptions resumed after the deposition of the limestone, generating hundreds of feet of tuff breccia and volcanic conglomerate, interspersed with periodic lava flows. In fact, the calcareous lenses of the Maemong limestone, which hold the oldest Miocene fossils are underlain by sequences of pillow lava hundreds of feet thick. Minor faulting complicated the formation of the Facpi volcanic member of the Umatac Formation. Quiet periods in between eruptions allowed the deposition of limestone, from coral reefs, that are now isolated pieces of the Maemong limestone north of the Talofofo River. Higher parts of the Tenjo block were probably eroded, given the presence of early Miocene reefs in central Guam. The Dandan volcanic flow is the final rock unit of the Umatac Formation.

The Bonya limestone overlies the Dandan member on the eastern coast. Parts of the island experienced underwater erosion as they began to uplift above the water surface. When they were exposed to rainfall, they rapidly weathered to clay. Like the Eocene caldera before it, the Miocene volcano collapsed, probably in connection with formation of the Dandan member.

The Alifan limestone began to deposit after the Bonya limestone as Guam became almost entirely submerged, resembling an atoll. Montmorillonite clay and lignite fragments accumulated in the higher elevation swamps near the shore. The current limestone ridge on the Mount Alifan-Mount Lamlam ridge may represent the remnants of an atoll lagoon. In north Guam, there are no early Miocene rocks. A period of uplift and erosion wore down the Mount Santa Rosa volcanic hills means that the Bonya limestone is overlain by the deep water Janum argillaceous limestone.

=== Pliocene-Holocene (5.33 million years ago-present) ===
The Pliocene marks the beginning of a gradual transition from lagoon and offshore limestones, like the Alifan limestone and Barrigada limestone, to the more coral-based Mariana limestone, due to structural deformation and faulting leading to emergence closer to the water surface. However, there are some spots, such as the 600 foot tall Nimitz Hill, where there is extensive displacement and signs of significant erosion between Mariana limestone on the hill and the argillaceous Agana limestone below.

In southern Guam, after the Alifan limestone formed, uplift prompted erosion which eliminated much of the rock and even allowed laterite weathering of underlying volcanic rocks. The Barrigada limestone in the north was uplifted and eroded as well, but parts of the north were resubmerged by the movement of the Adelup fault forming lagoon coral deposits around the Barrigada limestone. The deposition of the wave-break corals of the Mariana limestone continued through the Pleistocene. Numerous terraces formed around the island in the middle and late Pleistocene.

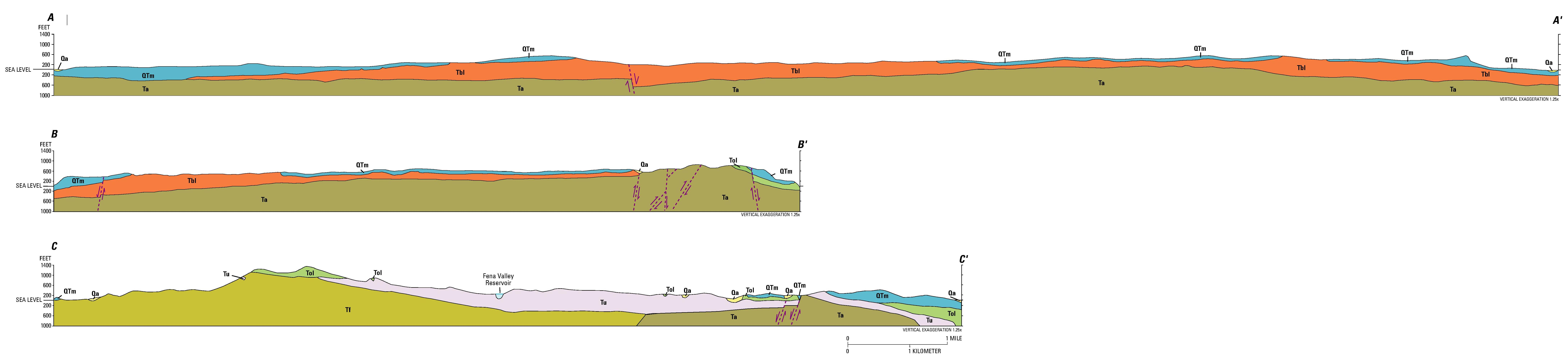
Geologic cross-sections of Guam corresponding to lines on map above.

== Hydrogeology ==
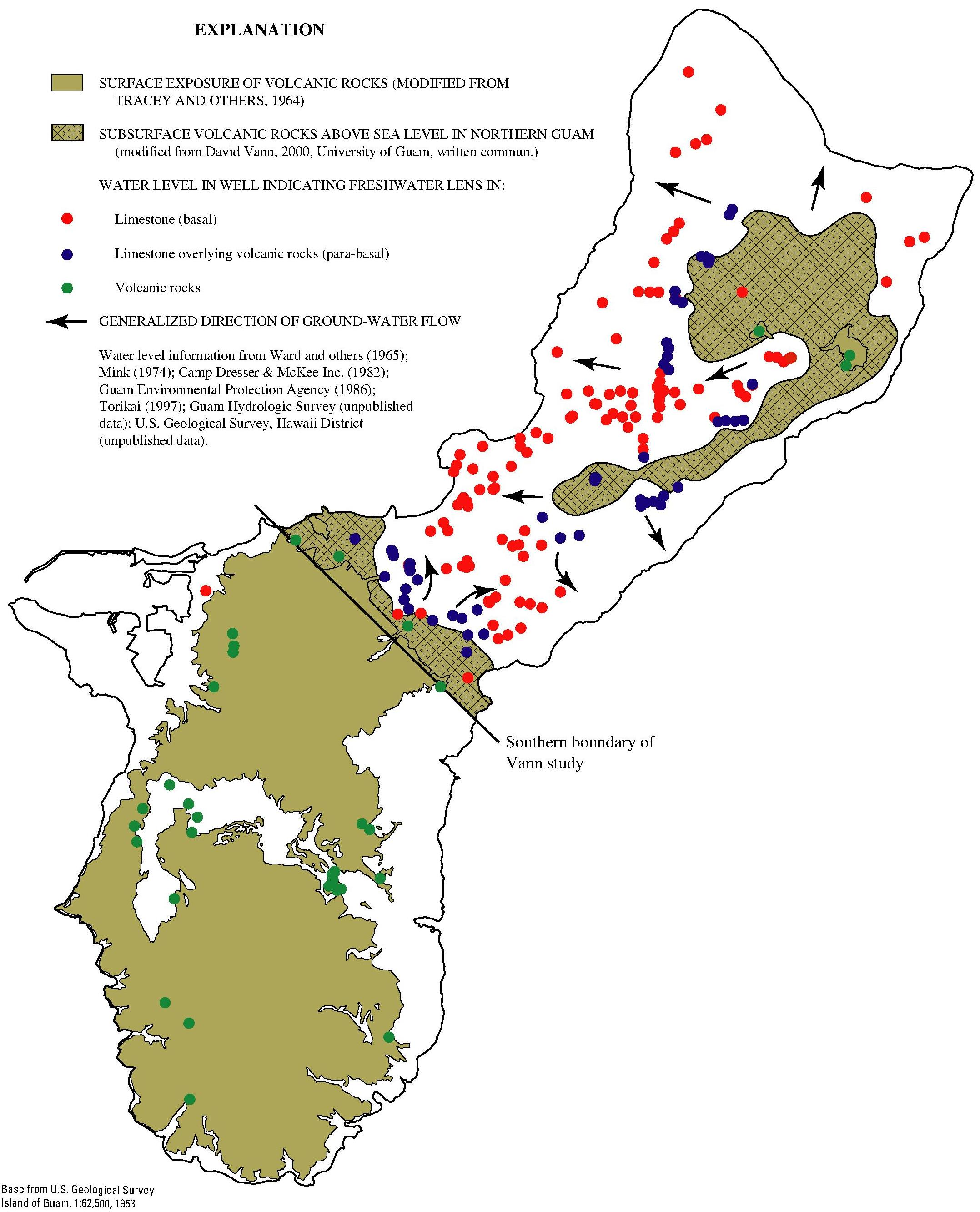
Water levels in selected wells in Guam

Groundwater supplies about 80% of the island's freshwater needs, with greater reliance on surface water in the south. Streams are only found in southern Guam, where volcanic rock with low-permeability slows the infiltration of rainwater into the ground. In the north, a limestone karst landscape quickly absorbs water. On Guam, freshwater forms a lens, with a transitional zone of brackish water to salt water underneath it.

Throughout the island, the freshwater lens is nearly flat, with water levels less than eight feet. In some cases, the lens extends into fractures in the volcanic rock, but for the most part, it is contained in limestone in the north. Minor areas of perched water occur in limestone, atop nearly impermeable volcanic rocks at different points.

The island has some ability to extract groundwater for drinking water and other uses, but there is a constant risk of saltwater intrusion. Well measurements indicate that further inland, thicker rocks moderate the effect of tide cycles in wells, such that wells within one mile of the coast had a range of half a foot, which dropped to 0.05 feet further inland. The Guam Waterworks Authority, Guam Environmental Protection Agency, the Air Force and the Navy manage the 180 wells throughout the island. A combination of high-permeability rock, over pumping and overcrowding of wells resulted in 32% of wells (measured in data from the early 1960s through 1997) exceeding a guideline of 250 mg/L chloride concentration.
