= Inafa'maolek =

Organization

Inafa'maolek is a charitable organisation which works on the island of Guam. The non-profit organisation aims to tackle social problems such as domestic violence. The organisation also works with young people doing workshops on issues such as eating disorders, bullying, suicide and sexual harassment.
