= Scouting in Guam =

- Website; Aloha Council site

Scouting in Guam is in a state of development and growth. Scouting has existed on the island since at least the 1940s, and may have been developed as early as the 1920s.

Boy Scouts of America has been in Guam since the creation of the Guam Council in 1947. Although being absorbed into the Direct Service Council in 1956, the Chamorro Council was chartered in 1970, before merging with Kilauea Council (based in Hilo, Hawaii) into the Aloha Council of Honolulu in 1973. It is now administered as the Aloha Council's Chamorro District.

The Chamorro Council's Order of the Arrow lodge was Achsin Lodge #565. When its council merged, Achsin also merged with Kamehameha Lodge #454 and Pupukea Lodge #557 to form Mokupuni O Lawelawe Lodge #567. When selected a new name and number for the lodge, they took 5 from Kamehameha, 6 from Achsin, and 7 from Pupukea. The lodge later changed its name to Nā Mokupuni O Lawelawe.

For girls, there are Girl Scouts of the USA Overseas on Guam, served by the Guam Girl Scouts Council in Hagåtña.
