= List of newspapers in Guam =

This is a list of newspapers in Guam.

== List of newspapers ==
- Pacific Daily News – Hagåtña, Guam.
- Guam Daily Post - Harmon, Guam.
