= List of colleges and universities in Guam =

This is a list of universities and colleges in Guam. This list also includes other educational institutions providing higher education, meaning tertiary, quaternary, and, in some cases, post-secondary education.

== Public institutions ==
=== Four-year institutions ===
- University of Guam, Mangilao

=== Two-year institutions ===
- Guam Community College, Mangilao

== Private institutions ==
- Pacific Islands University, Mangilao

== See also ==
- Lists of colleges and universities
- Lists of colleges and universities by country
