= Micronesia Challenge =

The Micronesia Challenge is a regional inter-governmental initiative in the western Pacific region that would facilitate more effective conservation of marine and forest resources in Micronesia.

On 5 November 2005, President of Palau Tommy E. Remengesau, Jr. called on his regional peers to join him in the Micronesia Challenge, which would conserve 30 percent of near shore coastal waters and 20 percent of forest land by 2020. Joining the initiative were Palau, the Federated States of Micronesia and Marshall Islands, and the U.S. territories of Guam and Northern Mariana Islands. These nations and territories represent nearly 5 percent of the marine area of the Pacific Ocean and 7 percent of its coastlines.
