= Suruhanu =

Suruhånu or Suruhåna are people who function as herbal healers in some Pacific Island cultures. Such people exist on the island of Guam and are a result of Pre-colonial times where people known as makahna were believed to mediate between the physical and spiritual worlds. It comes from the Spanish word cirujano (pronounced [θiɾuˈxano] or [siɾuˈxano]) or "surgeon", here taking the general meaning of healer.
