= List of political parties in Guam =

This article lists political parties in Guam. Guam has a two-party system; however, many people are elected to local positions without open affiliation. In addition, some elective offices are required to be nonpartisan.

== Registered parties ==
- Democratic Party of Guam
- Republican Party of Guam

== Defunct parties ==
- Write-In for '74 Party
- Popular Party
- Territorial Party

== See also ==
- Politics of Guam
- List of political parties by country
- Political party strength in Guam
