= 1993 Guam earthquake =

Earthquake and tsunami near Guam in the Pacific Ocean

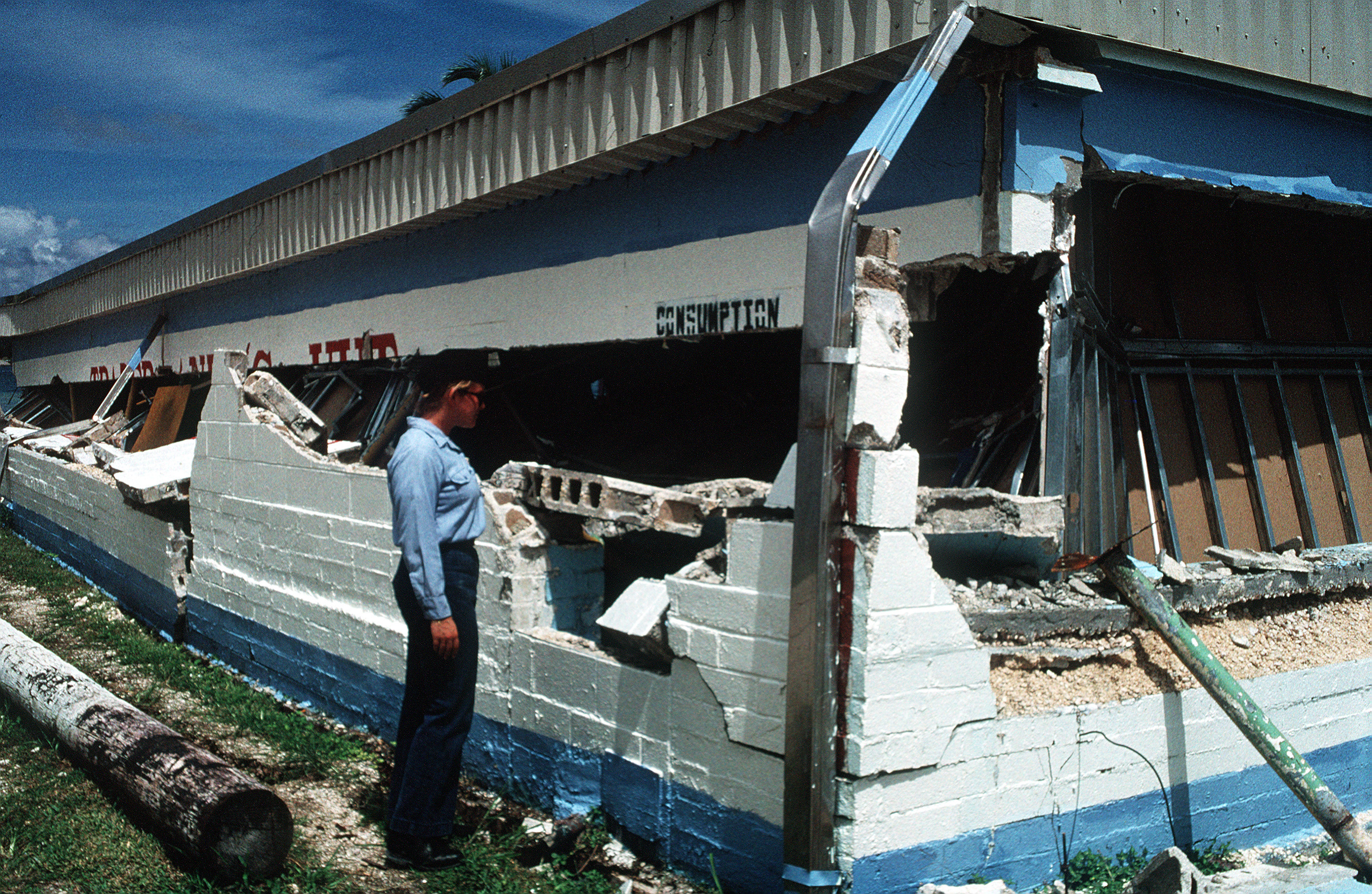
- Damage to a structure built on fill along Apra Harbor

- Location within Oceania
- UTC time: 1993-08-08 08:34:26
- ISC event: 212641
- USGS-ANSS: ComCat
- Local date: August 8, 1993
- Local time: 18:34:26
- Magnitude: 7.8 M_{w} 8.0 M_{s}
- Depth: 59 km (37 mi)
- Epicenter: 13°N 144.75°E
- Type: Thrust
- Total damage: $250 million
- Max. intensity: MMI IX (Violent)
- Tsunami: 2.13 m (7 ft 0 in)
- Casualties: 71 injured

The 1993 Guam earthquake occurred on August 8 at 6:34:26 pm local time with a moment magnitude of 7.8 and a maximum Mercalli intensity of IX (Violent). The thrust earthquake generated a non-destructive tsunami.

== Damage and casualties ==
The earthquake generated a non-destructive tsunami of about 6 in (15 cm), injured as many as 71 people, and inflicted about $250 million in damage on Guam.

== See also ==
- List of earthquakes in 1993
- List of earthquakes in Guam
