= Guam Community College =

Two-year college in Mangilao, Guam

- Former names: Guam Vocational Technical High School
- Motto: "Guam's Leader in Workforce Development"
- Type: Public
- Established: 1977
- President: Virginia C. Tudela (Interim)
- Academic staff: 245
- Students: 2,055
- Location: Mangilao, Guam, United States; 13°26′26″N 144°48′32″E
- Campus: Urban
- Colors: Dark cyan and light cyan

Guam Community College (GCC) is a community college in Mangilao, Guam. It was officially created by Public Law 14–77 in 1977 under Maryly Van Leer Peck's leadership. This law created the college by consolidating several pre-existing programs from a variety of institutions, including the Adult Evening School of the Guam Department of Education, the Community Career College of the University of Guam, the Apprenticeship Training Program of the University of Guam, and other programs originally created by Guam's Department of Labor and the Guam Police Department.

The U.S. Census Bureau puts the community college into the University of Guam census-designated place.

== History ==
Women's rights advocate and female engineer Maryly Van Leer founded several college programs while in Guam, one of which evolved into Guam Community College, and is considered its unofficial founder. Van Leer oversaw the relocation and construction of the newly established Guam Community College (GCC) in November 1977. The college included Van Leer's original program offerings from the University of Guam.

Its campus is centrally located on 32.75 acres (13.25 ha) and has continuous improvements over the years. The college plays an important role in the six island public high schools where it offers several significant education programs in Tourism, Marketing, AutoCad, Construction and many more. Mary A.Y. Okada is the current president and was appointed in 2007.

== Awards ==
=== Distinguished Alumni Award ===
This is a list of past GCC recipients of the Distinguished Alumni Award.

- 2009 Mr. Phillip Ada, Ms. Mary English
- 2010 Mr. Jeffrey John Ibanez
- 2011 Dr. Anita Borja Enriquez
- 2012 Dr. Kimberly Bersamin
- 2013 Mr. Eduardo Ilao
- 2014 Mr. Joseph Quitano
- 2015 Mr. Don Muna
- 2016 Mr. Eduardo Dela Peña, Jr.
- 2017 Ms. Erika Sotto Cruz
- 2018 Mr. Joseph J. Leon Guerrero
- 2019 Ms. Agnes Q. Diaz

== See also ==
- University of Guam
