= Music of Guam =

The music of Guam encompasses a broad range of traditional and contemporary music. Modern music from Guam includes elements of American, Spanish, Filipino and Polynesian music. The Spanish and Mexicans contributed a type of song called serenatas to the culture of Guam. Some traditional Catholic songs in the Spanish language, including "Mil Albricias", "Pastores a Belen", "Santa Maria de la Merced" or "En Lecho de Pajas" and some traditional love songs including "A mi morena", "Ay que triste desventura", "Cancion de Antonio Acosta" or "Te quiero amar" are preserved. Flora Baza Quan is known as the "Queen of Chamorro Music". The state song of Guam is "Stand Ye Guamanians" by Ramon Sablan, adopted in 1919, but better known as the 1974 Chamoru translation by Lagrimas Untalan, "Fanohge Chamoru."

== Music venues and institutions ==
Music institutions in Guam include the University of Guam's Fine Arts Department, Guam Symphony Society, Guam Choristers, Cantate Guam, and the Gregorian Institute of Guam. The Guam Symphony Society was founded in 1967, and hosts concerts such as the Symphony Seaside Concert and the Musikan Famagu'on for children. The two major local record labels are Napu Records and StelStar Records. In addition to the previously stated, there is the government sponsored Guam Territorial Band. The Guam territorial band hosts concerts yearly often free to the public, as well as representing Guam music on an international stage.

== Chamorro music ==
Traditional Chamorro instruments include the belembaotuyan, a hollow gourd stringed instrument, and the nose flute. Kantan singing is also popular. It is a kind of work song, begun by one person teasing another in verse form, and then continuing through a group one individual in turn.

Chamorro chants and Kantan Chamorrita (Chamorrita singing), a kind of Chamorro poetry, are also important elements of Guamanian music. Kantan Chamorrita is a kind of improvised poetry with a call and response format that is documented back to 1602 and remains a vital part of Chamorro culture. In Kantan Chamorrita, individuals and groups trade witty remarks at each other as part of a debate. These songs are "ancient folk songs, arranged in quatrains of two octosyllabic couplets, which, according to some writers, are composed on a single melody, the variations depending on the individual style of performance. The distinctive features are spontaneous improvisation and a dialogue performance between two or more people, depending on the occasion and function."

=== Performers ===
Chamorro popular musicians include KACY, Flora Baza Quan, Daniel De Leon Guerrero, and singer-songwriter J. D. Crutch.

The musical duo Gus and Doll (Agusto Quichocho and his wife Josephine Sablan Quichocho) were prominent performers of Chamorro music, active until the late 1980s.

Modern singer Pia Mia is the only artist from Guam to have a song on the Billboard Top 100, 2015's "Do It Again."
