= Elections in Guam =

Guam elects on the territorial level a governor and a legislature with the governor elected for a four-year term by the people. The Legislature of Guam has fifteen members elected at large in an open primary for two year terms.

The island also holds both Democratic and Republican presidential caucuses every election year, and conducts a presidential straw poll to coincide with the U.S. general election, even though Guam's votes do not officially count in presidential races.

Guam has a multi-party system, with two strong parties.

== Latest elections ==
=== 2014 general election ===
Republican Eddie Calvo was re-elected governor with 64% of the vote. Democrats retained control of the island's legislature.

=== 2016 presidential election ===
Hillary Clinton received nearly 60% of the vote in Guam's Democratic Primary, yielding her nine out of the island's 12 delegates. Donald Trump won all of Guam's nine delegates in the GOP caucus.

Clinton won the straw poll conducted in November. It was the first time since 1984 that Guam's straw poll failed to predict the results of the electoral vote on the mainland.

=== 2016 House election ===
Madeleine Bordallo was re-elected as Guam's nonvoting delegate to the U.S. House of Representatives.

=== 2016 legislative election ===
Democrats retained control of Guam's legislature.

=== 2018 general election ===
Democrat has gained the governorship and Democrats retained control of the island's legislature.

=== 2018 gubernatorial election ===
Democratic Former Senator and Former Bank of Guam President Lou Leon Guerrero was elected as the first female governor with 50% of the vote.

=== 2018 House election ===
Michael San Nicolas was elected as Guam's nonvoting delegate to the U.S. House of Representatives.

=== 2018 legislative election ===
Democrats retained control of Guam's legislature with 10 seats and Republicans got 5 seats.

=== 2020 general election ===
Joe Biden received nearly 69% of the vote in Guam's Democratic Primary, yielding him five out of the island's nine delegates. Donald Trump won all of Guam's nine delegates in the GOP caucus.

Biden won the straw poll conducted in November before the states picked up 270 to win.

=== 2020 House election ===
Michael San Nicolas was re-elected for as Guam's nonvoting delegate to the U.S. House of Representatives.

=== 2020 legislative election ===
Democrats retained control of Guam's legislature with 8 seats and Republicans got 7 seats.

=== 2020 local election ===
Democrats retained control of village mayors with 10 seats and Republicans got 9 seats.

=== 2022 general election ===
Democrat has gained the governorship and Democrats retained control of the island's legislature.

=== 2022 House election ===
James Moylan was elected for as Guam's nonvoting delegate to the U.S. House of Representatives.

=== 2022 gubernatorial election ===
Governor Lou Leon Guerrero was re-elected for a second term defeating former governor Felix Camacho.

=== 2022 attorney general election ===
Former attorney general Douglas Moylan has been elected for a second term for the first-time defeating incumbent Leevin Camacho.

=== 2022 legislative election ===
Democrats gained control of Guam's legislature with 9 seats and Republicans got 6 seats.

=== 2024 general election ===
Joe Biden ran unopposed in Guam's Democratic Primary, yielding him all seven of the island's delegates. Donald Trump won all of Guam's nine delegates in the GOP caucus. After, Biden withdrew from the race, Kamala Harris was selected as the nominee.

Harris won the straw poll conducted in November; albeit by a very narrow plurality. This marked only the second time (the other being 1980), that Guam voted for the loser of the popular vote as well as the electoral college.

=== 2024 legislative election ===
Republicans gained control of Guam's legislature, the first time since 2006. Republicans got 9 seats and Democrats got 6 seats.

=== 2024 House election ===
James Moylan was re-elected for as Guam's nonvoting delegate to the U.S. House of Representatives.

== See also ==
- Electoral calendar
- Electoral system
- Political party strength in Guam
