= Seal of Guam =

Official government emblem of the U.S. territory of Guam

- Armiger: Guam
- Adopted: 1946

The seal of Guam appears in the middle of the flag of the United States territory of Guam. It depicts Agaña Bay near Hagåtña, a local proa and a coconut tree. Charles Alan Pownall approved the seal in 1946. It depicts a coconut palm on the shore with a sailboat nearby on the water. The name "Guam" appears in red across the center of the seal.

== Symbolism ==
The coconut tree, also known as the Tree of Life, holds a dominant position on Guam's symbol. The shape of the seal is that of a Chamorro sling stone used as a weapon for warfare and hunting. The sling stone was quarried from basalt and coral. The coconut tree, growing in infertile sand, symbolizes self-sustenance and determination to grow and survive under any circumstance, with its fronds open to the sky—defies the elements to bend its will. Its bent trunk attests to a people which have been tested by famine, natural calamities, genocide and foreign wars but have continued to endure as a race. The seal also includes a flying Proa, a seagoing craft built by the Chamorro people, which was fast and agile in the water requiring great skill to build and sail. The Hagåtña River channel, where fresh water rushes out to interact with the ocean, symbolizes a willingness to share the resources of the land with others. The permanence of the land mass of Hila'an in the background demonstrates the Chamorro's commitment to their homeland and environment, be it sea or land. Also in the background, "Ritidian" juts majestically into the endless waters of the sea, portraying the people's faithful commitment to passing their proud heritage, culture, and language to the endless sea of future generations. Ritidian is often mistaken for Two Lover's point; although, the famous location is not visible from the point in Agana Bay.

== See also ==
- Flag of Guam
