= Economy of Guam =

The economy of Guam depends mainly on US military spending and on tourist revenue. Over the past 20 years, the tourist industry grew rapidly, creating a construction boom for new hotels, golf courses and other tourist amenities. More than 1.1 million tourists visit Guam each year including about 1,000,000 from Japan and 150,000 from Korea. Setbacks in the 1990s include numerous super-typhoons, a M7.8 earthquake, and a Korean airline crash.

More recently, SARS, the Iraq war and most importantly the Japan economy and accompanying yen-to-dollar adjustments have significantly impacted tourism with spending per person in the retail and attraction sectors dropping to nearly 50% of the peak levels reached in the mid-1990s. Nevertheless, as of 2005 tourism is finally starting to stabilize and recover.

Most food and industrial goods are imported. As Guam's tourist economy continues slowly to recover, over $1 billion in military spending on the island is projected in the coming several years. The Government of Guam (GovGuam) is the biggest employer on the island (exceeding the tourism industry and the federal military), with a payroll and retirement burden that has led in recent years to an ongoing and growing budget deficit.

== Statistics ==
Exports of Guam by product category (2019) Chemical products Transportation Machines Mineral products Plastics and rubbers Metals Foodstuffs Precious metals Textiles Instruments Animal products Vegetable products Paper goods Footwear and headwear Miscellaneous Stone and glass Wood products Animal and vegetable bi-products Animal hides Arts and antiques Weapons

=== Gross domestic product ===
GDP: purchasing power parity – $5.79 billion (2016 est.)

GDP (PPP) growth rate: 0.4%

GDP per capita (PPP): $35,600 (2016 est.)

GDP composition by sector:

- Agriculture: N/A
- Industry: N/A
- Services: N/A

=== Income and employment ===
Population below poverty line: 23% (2001 est.)

Inflation rate (consumer prices): 1% (2017 est.)

Labor force: 69,390 (non-military, 2010 est.)

Labor force by occupation: federal and territorial government 31%, private 69% (trade 21%, services 33%, construction 12%, other 3%) (1995)

Unemployment rate: 4.5% (2017 est.)

=== Core general fund ===
- Revenues: $718.5 million (2021)
- Expenditures: $725.0 million, excluding expenses funded by federal grants (2021)

=== Industry ===
Industries: US military, tourism, construction, transshipment services, concrete products, printing and publishing, food processing, textiles

Industrial production growth rate: N/A

Electricity production: 1,734 GWh (2011 est.)

Electricity production by source:

- Fossil fuels: 100%
- Hydro: 0%
- Nuclear: 0%
- Other: 0% (1998)

Electricity consumption: 1,613 GWh (2011 est.)

=== Trade ===
Agricultural products: fruits, copra, vegetables, eggs, pork, poultry, beef

==== Exports ====
Total: $1.403 billion (2019 est.)

Exported commodities: refined petroleum, scrap iron, scrap copper, trunks and cases, aircraft parts (2022)

Export partners: Singapore 30%, Taiwan 20%, South Korea 14%, Philippines 12%, Hong Kong 8% (2022)

==== Imports ====
Total: $3.552 billion (2019 est.)

Imported commodities: refined petroleum, cars, raw iron bars, electric generating sets, trunks and cases (2022)

Import partners: South Korea 37%, Singapore 35%, Japan 12%, Taiwan 3%, Hong Kong 3% (2022)

External debt: N/A

Economic aid received: N/A; note – although Guam receives no foreign aid, it does receive large transfer payments from the general revenues of the US Federal Treasury into which Guamanians pay no income or excise taxes. Guamanians do however contribute to Social Security and Medicare through FICA taxes.

Currency: 1 United States dollar (USD) = 100 cents

Fiscal year: 1 October – 30 September
