= Energy in Guam =

The pattern of energy production and use in Guam is shaped by its location, a remote island. Almost all energy is reliant on imports of petroleum products for use in transport and electricity. Guam has no domestic production of conventional fuels such as oil, natural gas or coal. Its economy is dependent on the import of gasoline and jet fuel for transport and residual fuel oil for electricity. One third of electricity produced is used in commercial settings including the leading industry of tourism. Despite making up about one-tenth of the islands population, the U.S. military uses one-fifth of the island's energy.

Rising fuel costs and environmental concerns have led to major plans to alter the electrical industry in Guam. Renewables and cleaner burning natural gas and diesel power are planned.

== Electricity ==
=== Conventional ===
Guam has a rated generating capacity of 560 MW, more than twice its historical highest load. This is supplied by several plants burning residual fuel oil operated for the Guam Power Authority by independent power providers. In 2015 electricity cost 2.5 times as much on Guam as on the U.S. mainland. A new plant was proposed in 2014 which would replace all of these generators and run on either diesel or on liquified natural gas. This new plant would comply with U.S. EPA Clean Air Act requirements.

=== Renewable energy ===
Until 2015, only a few off-grid photovoltaic systems (PV) and some distributed generation PV and small wind turbines were in use on the island. Plans for several large solar farms have been announced. Guam has adopted a renewables policy that requires the reduction of fossil fuel consumption by 2020 to 20% less than the rate in 2010. Another requirement is for 5% of electricity in 2015 to be from renewables, increasing to 25% by 2035. A net metering program began in 2009.

A 25.6MW Dan Dan solar farm at Inarajan came online in late 2015. It would reduce fuel oil consumption by almost 2 million barrels a year. The U.S. military has proposed to lease land for a 44 MW solar farm. Proposals for a second solar farm of up to 40MW were requested in 2015 to include details on incorporating battery storage.

A single 0.275MW wind turbine is expected to be online in 2015 as part of a pilot program in wind energy.

A 10MW waste to energy plant has been proposed but, in 2015, has met resistance due to cost and air pollution concerns.
