= List of Superfund sites in Guam =

This is a list of Superfund sites in Guam designated under the Comprehensive Environmental Response, Compensation and Liability Act (CERCLA) environmental law:

CERCLIS ID	Name	Location	Reason	Proposed	Listed	Construction completed	Partially deleted	Deleted
GU6571999519	Andersen Air Force Base	Yigo	Groundwater and soil contaminated with dioxins/dibenzofurans, metals, polycyclic aromatic hydrocarbon, polychlorinated biphenyls, persistent organic pollutants, pesticides, and volatile organic compounds including trichloroethylene, toluene, and tetrachloroethane.	02/07/1992	10/14/1992	N/A	N/A	N/A
GUD980637649	Ordot Landfill	Hagåtña	Groundwater and soil contaminated with iron and manganese from landfill leachate.	12/30/1982	09/08/1983	09/09/1992	N/A	N/A

== See also ==
- List of Superfund sites in the United States
- List of environmental issues
- List of waste types
- TOXMAP
