= Transportation in Guam =

The United States territory of Guam has no railways or freeways, nor does it have a merchant marine. Apra Harbor is the largest port, serving almost all commercial traffic, including cruise, cargo and fishing vessels. There are smaller harbors located on the island (most notably one in Hagatna and one in Agat) which serve recreational boaters. Roads are primarily paved by a mixture of coral and oil, and when the mixture gets wet it tends to have oil float to the surface, making the roads dangerous. This is one of the reasons the speed limit on most of the island is 35 mph. But, during road repair or maintenance, a different mixture of asphalt that is not as slippery is used. Its main commercial airport is the Antonio B. Won Pat International Airport.

The Guam Department of Public Works is the government agency in charge of building, managing, and maintaining transportation infrastructure and equipment.

Route Marker for Guam Highway 8.

Highways:

total: 885 km
paved: 675 km
unpaved: 210 km
note: there is another 685 km of roads classified non-public, including roads located on federal government installations

Airports: 5 (1999 est.)

Airports - with paved runways:

total: 4
over 3,047 m: 2
2,438 to 3,047 m: 1
914 to 1,523 m: 1 (2007 est.)

Airports - with unpaved runways:

total: 1
under 914 m: 1 (2007 est.)

== See also ==
- List of airports in Guam
- List of highways in Guam
- Port of Guam
- Transport in American Samoa
- Transportation in the Northern Mariana Islands
- Transportation in Puerto Rico
- Transportation in the United States Virgin Islands
