= Politics of Guam =

Guam is a two-party presidential representative democracy, in which the Governor is the head of government. Guam is an organized, unincorporated territory of the United States, with policy relations between Guam and the US under the jurisdiction of the Office of Insular Affairs. Guam is also listed on the United Nations list of non-self-governing territories.

== Background ==
The economic situation in Guam is currently dependent on the significant U.S. military presence there. Its status as a tourist destination for Japanese, Singaporeans and South Koreans also contributes to Guam's economy. It has also emerged as a destination for economic migrants from the Philippines working at lower-wage jobs in the hospitality industry.

== Debate over political status ==
Maintenance of the status quo vis-à-vis the current political relationship between the territory and the United States is controversial. There is a significant movement in favor of the Territory becoming a commonwealth, which would give it a political status similar to Puerto Rico and the Northern Mariana Islands.

Competing movements exist, which advocate political independence from the United States, statehood, or a combination with the Northern Mariana Islands as a single territory (not necessarily commonwealth). Therese M. Terlaje, Speaker of the Legislature of Guam, indicated support in 2018 for holding a plebiscite to allow Guamians to vote for their favored political status.

These proposals, however, are not seen as favorable by the U.S. federal government, which argues Guam does not have the financial stability or self-sufficiency to warrant such status. They cite Guam's increasing reliance on Federal spending as evidence, and question how commonwealth status or statehood would benefit the United States as a whole.

A portion of the people on Guam favors a modified version of the current Territorial status, involving greater autonomy from the federal government (similar to the autonomy of individual States). Perceived indifference by the U.S. Congress regarding a change-of-status petition submitted by Guam has led many to feel that the territory is being deprived of the benefits of a more equitable union with the United States.

== Past referendums on political status ==
=== January 1982 status referendum ===
In January 1982, a referendum on Guam's status was held, with a 49.49% plurality of voters favoring commonwealth status, with 25.65% favoring statehood, the second most popular option. 10.19% said they supported the status quo, while 5.40% supported U.S. incorporated territory status. 3.9% of voters favored a free association agreement with the U.S., while independence was the least popular option, garnering 3.82% support.

=== September 1982 status referendum ===
A second referendum with the two most popular options in the original vote (commonwealth status and statehood) was held in September 1982. By a 72.82% to 27.18% margin, Guamanians voted in favor of commonwealth status over statehood. However, Guam has not received commonwealth status, and remains an unincorporated territory.

=== Future referendums ===
In 2000, the Guam Legislature authorized the creation of a non-binding vote to allow native inhabitants of Guam to cast their votes in favor of statehood, a free association agreement, or outright independence from the United States. In 2017, Chief Judge Frances Tydingco-Gatewood declared the proposal unconstitutional under the 15th Amendment.

== See also ==
- Political party strength in Guam
