= Guam Police Department =

Law enforcement of the U.S. territory of Guam

Guam Police patch

The Guam Police Department (GPD; Chamorro: Dipåttamenton Polisian Guåhan) is the law enforcement agency in the United States territory of Guam. The department has jurisdiction across the entire territory, except for areas covered by the port, airport and military bases; the Guam Police Department has authority over military dependents on base, since civilians cannot be charged under the Uniform Code of Military Justice.

The police department is headquartered in the Guam Police Department Building in the Tiyan area of Barrigada, and operates four precincts.

== History ==
The Guam Police Department became its own entity in 1985, following operations as the Department of Public Safety in 1952. Prior to this, law enforcement on Guam was handled by the U.S. Navy administered Guam Insular Guard and the civilian run Guam Insular Patrol Force.

== Gallery ==
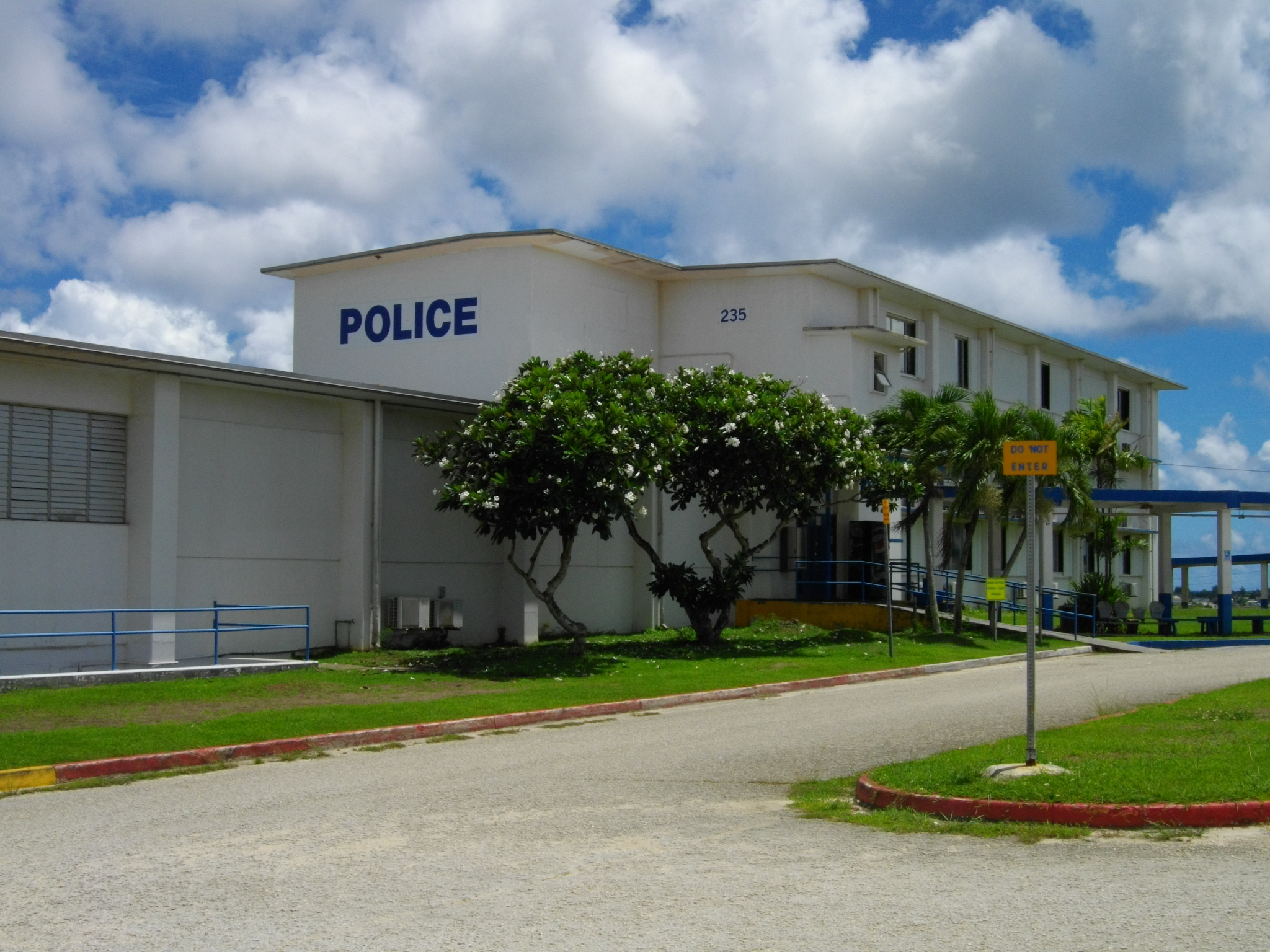
Guam Police Department Building in Tiyan

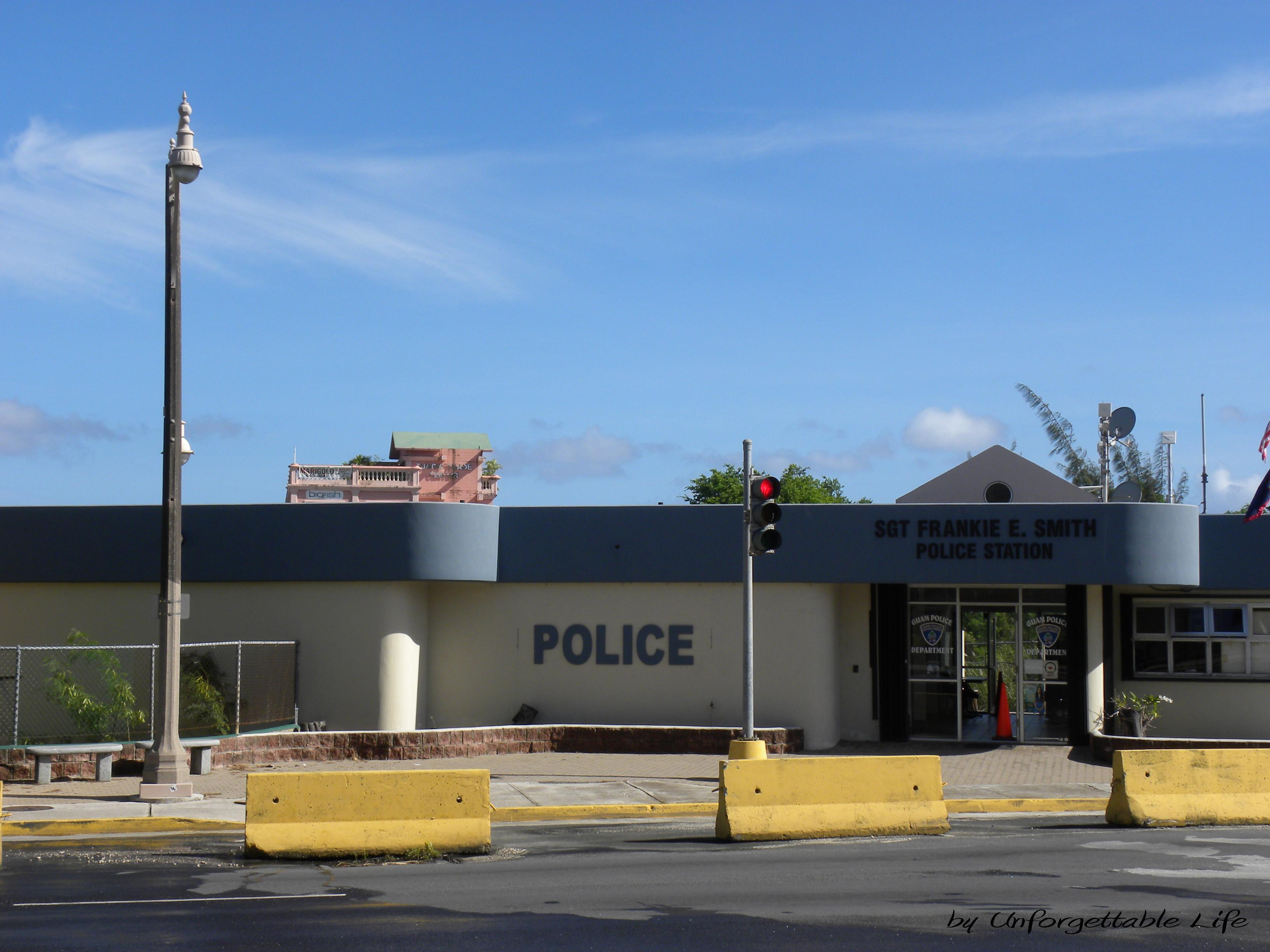
Sgt. Frankie E. Smith Police Station, Tumon

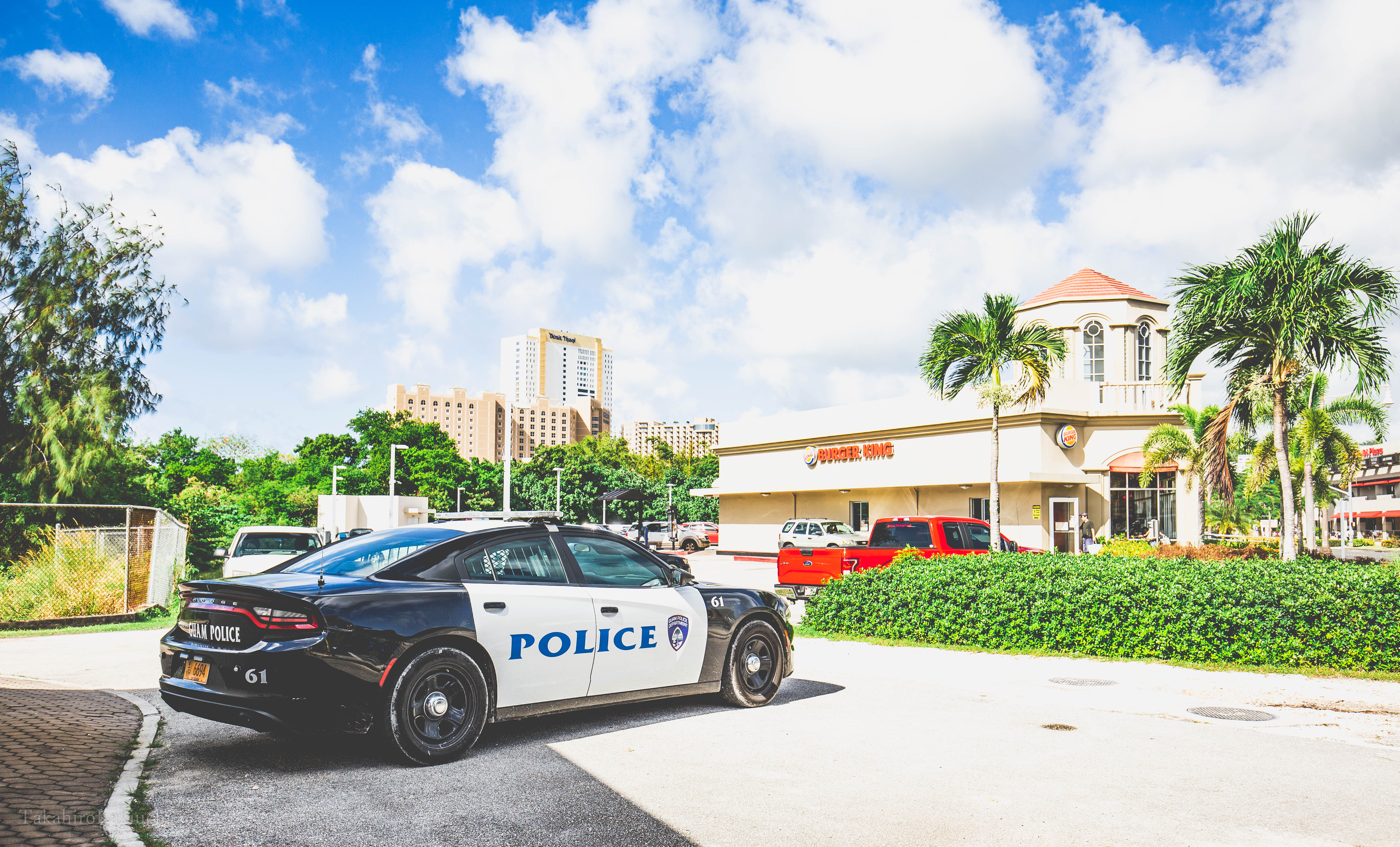
Dodge Charger in GPD service
