= Typhoon Yutu =

Pacific typhoon in 2018

Typhoon Yutu (Rosita)
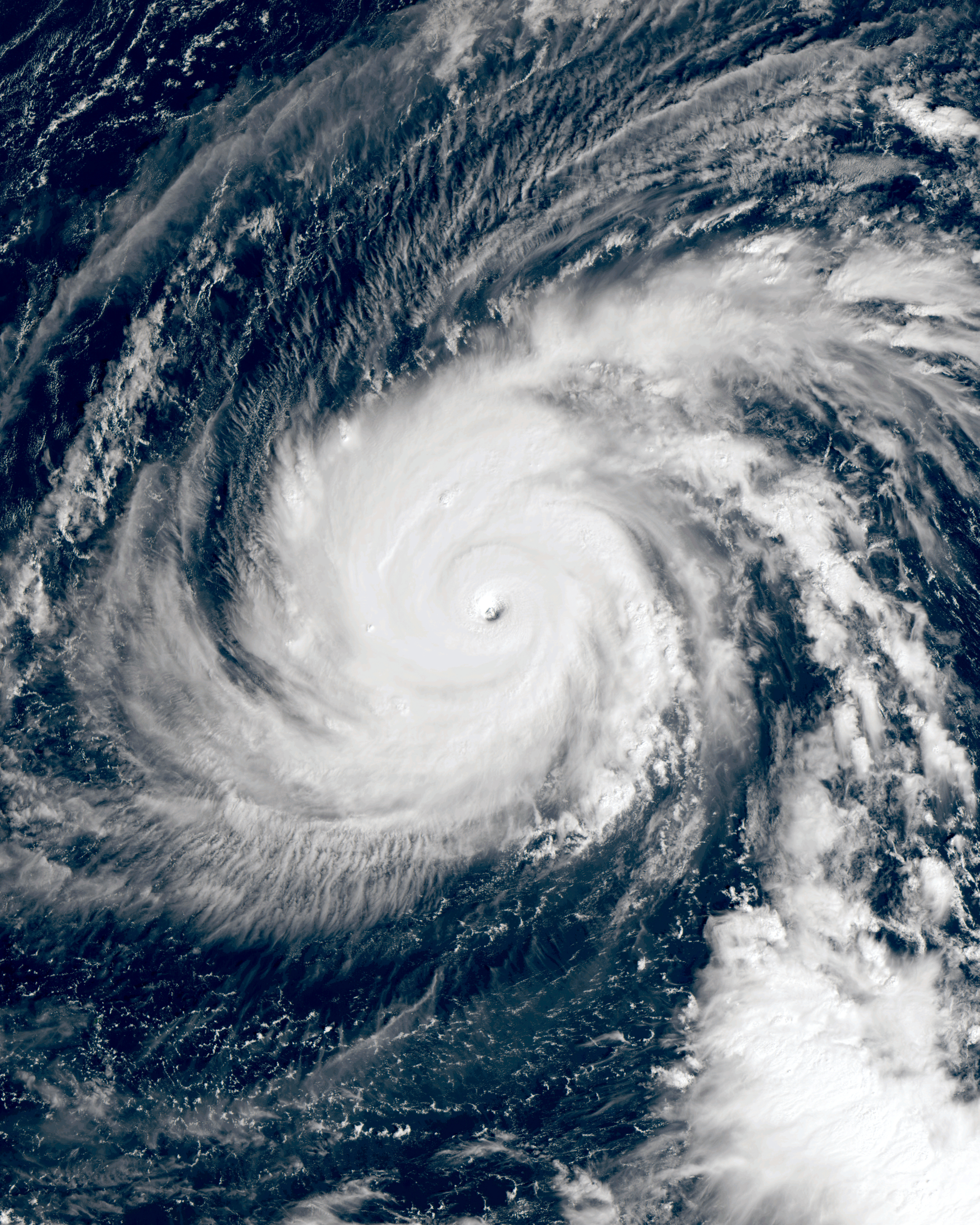
- Yutu at peak intensity west of the Northern Mariana Islands on October 25

Meteorological history
- Formed: October 20, 2018
- Dissipated: November 3, 2018

Violent typhoon
- 10-minute sustained (JMA)
- Highest winds: 215 km/h (130 mph)
- Lowest pressure: 900 hPa (mbar); 26.58 inHg

Category 5-equivalent super typhoon
- 1-minute sustained (SSHWS/JTWC)
- Highest winds: 280 km/h (175 mph)
- Lowest pressure: 904 hPa (mbar); 26.70 inHg

Overall effects
- Fatalities: 35
- Damage: >$856 million (2018 USD)
- Areas affected: Mariana Islands (particularly Tinian and Saipan), Philippines, Hong Kong
- IBTrACS
- Part of the 2018 Pacific typhoon season

Typhoon Yutu, (Note: The name Yutu (Mandarin: 玉兔, [y˥˩ tʰu˥˩]) was contributed by China and refers to the Jade Rabbit, a mythical rabbit on the moon in Mandarin.) known in the Philippines as Typhoon Rosita, was an extremely powerful tropical cyclone that caused catastrophic destruction on the islands of Saipan and Tinian in the Northern Mariana Islands, and later impacted the Philippines in October 2018. It was the strongest typhoon ever recorded to impact the Mariana Islands before Typhoon Bavi in 2026, and is tied as the second-strongest tropical cyclone to strike the United States and its unincorporated territories by both wind speed and barometric pressure, behind Bavi. It also tied Typhoon Kong-rey as the most powerful tropical cyclone worldwide in 2018. The twenty-sixth named storm and the twelfth typhoon of the 2018 Pacific typhoon season, Yutu originated as a tropical depression moving westward around the Marshall Islands on October 20, becoming a tropical storm by October 22 and receiving its name from the Japan Meteorological Agency. Favorable conditions led to a period of rapid intensification as it moved west-northwestward, and by October 24, Yutu had achieved its peak intensity as it made landfall over Tinian on October 25. An eyewall replacement cycle ensued, before the storm re-strengthened as it approached Luzon, which then entered marginal conditions; it made a second landfall over Dinapigue, Isabela by October 29 before entering the South China Sea, where it weakened turning northward until it had dissipated by November 3.

An emergency was declared for the Northern Mariana Islands as Yutu approached the archipelago, while tropical cyclone warnings and watches were raised. Winds of 270 km/h (170 mph) and gusts of 320 km/h (200 mph) swept across Tinian and Saipan, causing devastating damage throughout the Northern Mariana Islands that amounted over US$800 million, far exceeding that of Typhoon Soudelor in 2015. The storm destroyed up to 6,000 homes and toppled 962 power poles in Saipan and Tinian, leaving the islands without power for months. Health centers and airports in the two islands sustained serious damage. Two women were killed in Saipan and 121–133 people were injured. Yutu caused power outages to Rota and Guam, with damage to the latter island estimated at US$750,000. In response to the disaster, a major disaster declaration from U.S. President Donald Trump was signed; the Northern Mariana Islands received aid from organizations and local and federal governments.

Tropical Cyclone Wind Signals were issued throughout Luzon while the Philippines was still recovering from Typhoon Mangkhut, leading to pre-emptive evacuation of 32,519 people. Yutu brought rainfall of 50 to 300 mm (2.0 to 11.8 in) on the island, flooding low-lying areas. Yutu affected 567,691 people across the nation, displacing a majority of them after damaging 66,165 homes. The storm killed 32 people in the country, 21 of which died in Natonin from one of at least eleven landslides, and also injured two. Power outages occurred across Luzon, with most of it restored by October 31. Agricultural damage in the Philippines amounted to ₱2.904 billion (US$55.160 million). Elsewhere, a man in Hong Kong died while surfing in high waves as a typhoon signal was hoisted.

== Meteorological history ==
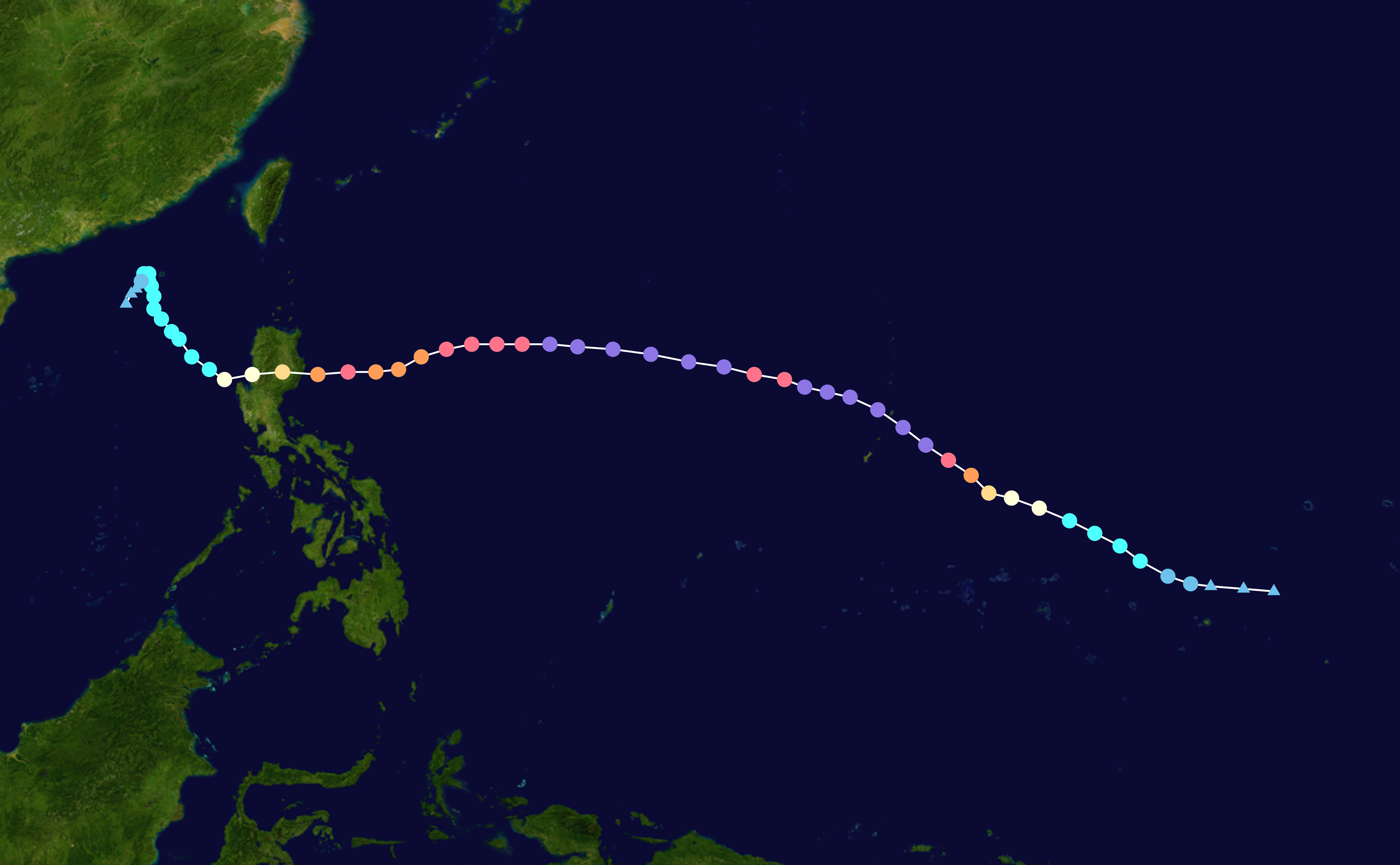
Map plotting the storm's track and intensity, according to the Saffir–Simpson scale Map key Saffir–Simpson scale Tropical depression (≤38 mph, ≤62 km/h) Tropical storm (39–73 mph, 63–118 km/h) Category 1 (74–95 mph, 119–153 km/h) Category 2 (96–110 mph, 154–177 km/h) Category 3 (111–129 mph, 178–208 km/h) Category 4 (130–156 mph, 209–251 km/h) Category 5 (≥157 mph, ≥252 km/h) Unknown Storm type Tropical cyclone Subtropical cyclone Extratropical cyclone, remnant low, tropical disturbance, or monsoon depression

On October 18, 2018, an unorganized tropical disturbance formed near 8.6°N 169.4°E, attaining scattered convection, or thunderstorms, over conducive conditions for tropical cyclogenesis of low vertical wind shear and warm sea surface temperatures, in addition to dual outflow channels aloft. Moving westward during October 20, deepening convection wrapped into the elongated low-level circulation. By 18:00 UTC, the Japan Meteorological Agency (JMA) ranked the storm system a tropical depression near the Marshall Islands. Eighteen hours later on October 21, the United States Joint Typhoon Warning Center (JTWC) designated it 31W. A subtropical ridge to the southwest steered the storm west-northwestward, towards the Mariana Islands. Excellent outflow around the storm was limited by a weak tropical upper tropospheric trough (TUTT) cell to the northwest, though the cell soon diminished the next day. At 00:00 UTC, both the JMA and JTWC classified the system a tropical storm, with the former naming it Yutu. The strongest convective activity occurred to the east and south as Yutu expanded in size; an intense rainband to the south later developed, marking the beginning of a period of explosive intensification. Convection bloomed over the center, significantly improving its structure. At 18:00 UTC, the JMA upgraded Yutu to a severe tropical storm, and six hours later on October 23, both the JMA and JTWC classified the storm a typhoon.

A pinhole eye was later apparent on satellite imagery. Amid very favorable conditions, with the addition of high ocean heat content, the eye became well-defined. By 00:00 UTC of October 24, Yutu was classified a super typhoon by the JTWC. Yutu presented extremely deep convective bands to the north and south, and 12 hours later, had reached its peak intensity; the JMA estimated 10-minute maximum sustained winds of 215 km/h (130 mph) and a barometric pressure of 900 hPa (26.58 inHg). The JTWC assessed 1-minute winds of 280 km/h (175 mph), revised from preliminary estimates of 285 km/h (180 mph) based on Dvorak estimates of T7.5—which utilized satellite appearance to determine intensity. Between 14:00 UTC and 18:00 UTC (00:00 ChST and 04:00 ChST of October 25), Yutu struck Tinian and the southern portion of Saipan at peak intensity. becoming the most powerful storm on record to impact the Northern Mariana Islands at the time, surpassing Typhoon Soudelor in 2015. Additionally, the JTWC reported a lowest central pressure of 904 hPa (26.70 inHg) at 18:00 UTC. After striking the Mariana Islands, an eyewall replacement cycle occurred, halting any strengthening. Mid-level dry air thinned the east side of the eyewall, with an anticyclone to the east obstructing outflow during October 25. After completing the cycle on October 26, the eye grew to 41 km (25 mi) and became well-defined once again, as low easterly wind shear and excellent outflow persevered despite the anticyclone. Strengthening resumed albeit with less outflow to the east, and by 18:00 UTC, the JMA and the JTWC reported that Yutu had reached a second peak; the JMA estimated winds of 195 km/h (120 mph) and a minimum barometric pressure of 915 hPa (27.02 inHg), and the JTWC gave Yutu the same wind estimate as the previous peak.

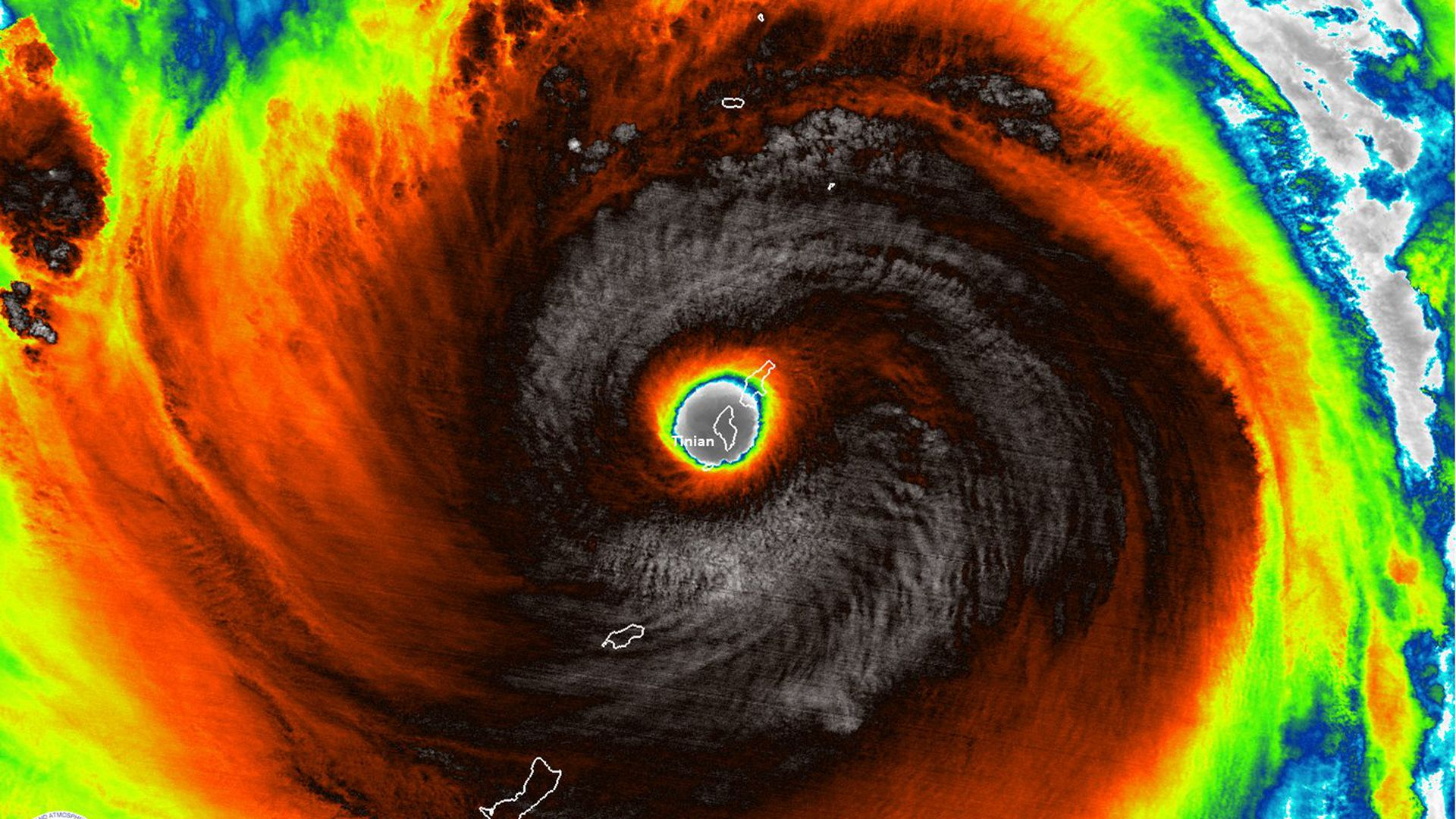
Infrared satellite image of Typhoon Yutu directly over Tinian on October 24

Over the Philippine Sea, Yutu crossed the 135°E boundary of the Philippine Area of Responsibility (PAR) at 00:00 UTC of October 27, receiving the local name Rosita from PAGASA. Steering westward towards Luzon, Yutu remained over warm waters, though the eye turned ragged. Yutu briefly entered a region of high vertical wind shear. On October 28, convection eroded off the eastern edge of Yutu from westerly dry air, as cloud tops warmed and the eye contracted; on this basis, the JTWC assessed that Yutu had weakened below super typhoon strength at 12:00 UTC. Sea surface temperatures had also decreased in the cold wakes of previous Typhoons Mangkhut, Trami, and Kong-rey, advected by the North Equatorial Current. After outflow had reduced, rainbands began collapsing while Yutu drifted west-southwestward. On October 29, the eye turned cloud-filled, constricting most convection to the southern eyewall. Between 20:00 UTC and 21:00 UTC, Yutu made landfall over Dinapigue, Isabela, Philippines, with winds of 139 km/h (86 mph) estimated by PAGASA. The JTWC, however, reported that Yutu had made landfall at 19:50 UTC. Over the next day inland, the storm continued to rapidly decay; despite this, the system remained organized as it began to emerge over the South China Sea, though it weakened into a severe tropical storm at 06:00 UTC according to the JMA.

Moving away from the Philippines, Yutu re-consolidated from improved northern banding, but weakened into a tropical storm at 18:00 UTC, according to the JTWC. At 06:00 UTC of October 31, the JMA downgraded Yutu to a tropical storm. Meanwhile, the storm left the PAR at 08:00 UTC. Exhibiting a partially-exposed center, Yutu turned northwestward, stockpiling convection over its southern quadrant. Moreover, moderate wind shear was subdued by strong poleward outflow, making conditions favorable for intensification again. By November 1, Yutu had briefly strengthened to near typhoon-force winds of 110 km/h (70 mph), according to the JTWC. However, Yutu began experiencing moderate to high wind shear turning northward, limiting outflow and displacing deep convection to the northeast of the poorly-defined center. By November 2, the JMA reported that Yutu had weakened into a tropical depression at 06:00 UTC; the JTWC followed suit in downgrading the system six hours later. After the storm had lost all of its convection from unfavorable wind shear 287 km (178 mi) southeast of Hong Kong, the JTWC reported that Yutu had degenerated into a tropical disturbance at 18:00 UTC, whereas the JMA continued monitoring the system until it had dissipated on November 3 at 06:00 UTC.

== Preparations ==
=== Mariana Islands ===
Infrared satellite animation of Typhoon Yutu rapidly intensifying while approaching the Mariana Islands on October 23–24

On October 20, the National Weather Service (NWS) office in Tiyan, Guam released a Special Weather Statement on the pre-Yutu disturbance after a Tropical Cyclone Formation Alert from the JTWC was issued, stating that it could impact the Mariana Islands by midweek. Two days later, the NWS instated a tropical storm watch for Rota and a typhoon watch on Saipan and Tinian. As Tropical Storm Yutu continued towards the archipelago, tropical storm watches were added on Guam, Alamagan, Pagan, and Agrihan. With forecasts stating that Yutu would become a typhoon, the watches for Saipan and Tinian were upgraded to warnings on October 23; all tropical storm watches were upgraded to warnings later that day, and the typhoon watch for Rota was upgraded to a warning also. After Yutu had made landfall, all warnings and watches were canceled on October 25 as it moved away. In the month prior to Yutu, Typhoon Mangkhut struck the Mariana Islands, prompting emergency officials to stockpile supplies. With relief supplies largely unused, storage facilities on Guam had 220,000 liters of water and 260,000 meals readily available.

Condition of Readiness (COR) 2 was hoisted in Rota, Saipan, and Tinian on October 23, before it was upgraded to COR 1 the next day after Yutu had become a super typhoon. Governor Ralph Torres ordered all government offices to shut down in preparation of Yutu. Additionally, Northern Marianas College campuses were closed on October 23. The Chief Judge of the District Court, Ramona Villagomez Manglona, closed the federal court. Attorney General Edward Manibusan warned retailers against price gouging. Public schools canceled classes across the three main islands. Seven were used as shelter to accommodate 326 people; some of them were filled quickly. Hundreds of cars lined up at gas stations. U.S. President Donald Trump declared an emergency for the Northern Islands on October 24, which allowed the Federal Emergency Management Agency (FEMA) to deploy personnel to both Tinian and Saipan ahead of the storm. The Department of Fire and Emergency Medical Services in Saipan deployed a team in preparations. All flights in the Northern Marianas were canceled, though the Saipan International Airport remained open. The Commonwealth Utilities Corp. shut its water distribution system to conserve water tanks. Several businesses were closed, hotel constructions were suspended, and banks, restaurants, and other shops were boarded. Imperial Pacific suspended its casino. The United States Postal Service closed its offices in Saipan and Rota. United States Coast Guard ports were closed across Saipan, Tinian, Rota, and also Guam.

COR 2 was also hoisted in Guam, before it was upgraded to COR 1. People were encouraged to report price gouging to the Office of the island's Attorney General. Governor Eddie Baza Calvo declared a state of emergency in anticipation of the typhoon. The Guam Department of Education closed all of its schools, with eight of them turned into emergency shelters to accommodate nearly 2,200 people. Catholic schools and charter schools were closed as well. St. John's School, the University of Guam, Guam Community College, and Harvest Christian Academy were also closed. The Guam Regional Transit Authority halted bus operations in response to the COR 2, and transit services were paused until two hours after COR 4—the normal Condition of Readiness. Banks were closed across the island, along with post offices, and all government agencies. The Legislature, Judiciary, and District Court were all closed as well. Guam Memorial Hospital, Guam Regional Medical City, and Naval Hospital Guam suspended all operations. Two Lovers Point and the War in the Pacific National Historical Park were closed. Flights to and from Antonio B. Won Pat International Airport were canceled.

=== Philippines ===
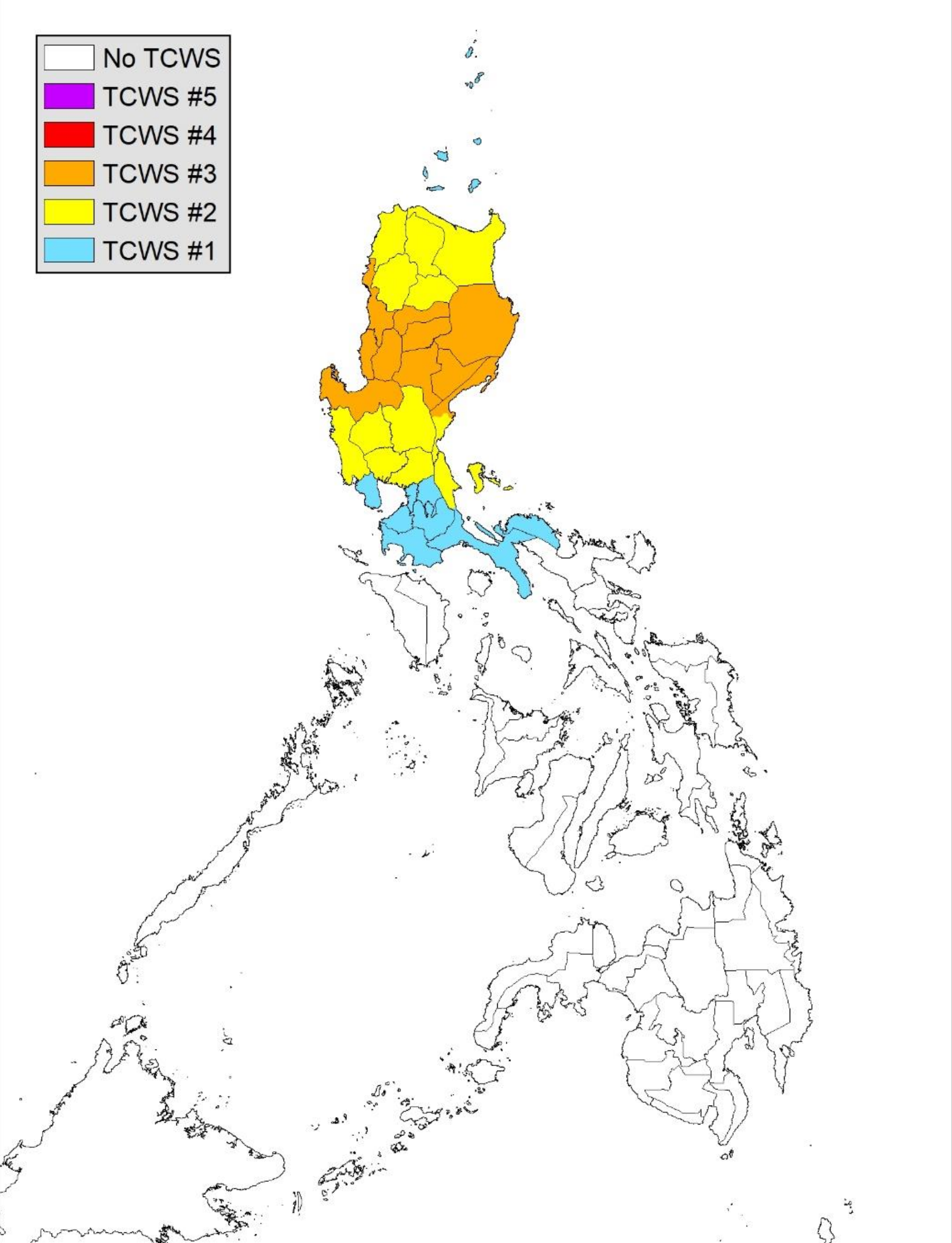
Highest Tropical Cyclone Wind Signal issued by PAGASA for Yutu (Rosita)

On October 27, after Yutu (Rosita) had entered the Philippine Area of Responsibility, the PAGASA issued gale warnings across the northern and eastern seaboards of Luzon and the eastern seaboard of the Visayas, due to the enhancement of the northeast monsoon by Yutu, which could also bring light rain over Batanes, the Babuyan Islands, the Ilocos Region, the Cordillera Administrative Region (CAR), and Cagayan Valley. The agency also advised fishermen and others with small vessels to not sail in those areas, while those with larger vessels were advised to look out for big waves. Starting October 28, PAGASA began releasing Tropical Cyclone Wind Signals (TCWS) across regions of the Philippines; TCWS No. 1 was raised across 23 areas or provinces in the Northern Philippines. Over the following days, TCWS No. 1 would span from the southern tip of Quezon to Batanes. On October 29, TCWS No. 2 was hoisted across Cagayan, Isabela, Aurora, Quirino, and Polillo Island, before it extended to Mountain Province, Ifugao, Benguet, and Nueva Vizcaya that same day. The signals for Isabela, Quirino, and the northern part of Aurora were raised to TCWS No. 3 along with Nueva Vizcaya and Ifugao. TCWS No. 3 was then raised across Benguet, La Union, Ilocos Sur, Mountain Province, and Pangasinan. An orange rainfall warning was issued across Bataan, Bulacan, Nueva Ecija, and Rizal, and extended to Pampanga, after Yutu had made landfall. After Yutu had cross Luzon by October 31, PAGASA no longer placed areas under warning signals.

About 155,242 people had moved to 1,388 evacuation centers. 593 cities or municipalities across Ilocos Region, Cagayan Valley, Central Luzon, Calabarzon, the Bicol Region, CAR, and Metro Manila had classes suspended, and 193 across Ilocos, Cagayan Valley, and CAR suspended government work. 44 flights were canceled, with 38 domestic and 6 international. 2,267 passengers and 217 sea vessels were stranded while sheltering in the ports. The Department of Social Welfare and Development had stockpiled 376,330 family food packages and relief items worth ₱919.672 million (US$17.463 million). Yutu was anticipated to produce similar effects of Typhoon Mangkhut (Ompong), which had devastated the country in September. While President Rodrigo Duterte visited areas previously affected by Mangkhut ahead of Yutu, he received complaints from local government unit officials that the Commission on Audit did not allow cash advancements for the procurement of building materials intended for the victims of Mangkhut.

=== Hong Kong ===
The Hong Kong Observatory (HKO) hoisted a No. 1 Standby Signal on October 31 as Yutu was 670 km (420 mi) southeast of the region. The next day while it was 370 km (230 mi) southeast, the agency raised a No. 3 Strong Wind Signal, the first in November since Typhoon Ira in 1993. As it weakened however, the signal was lowered to No. 1 on November 2, and was later canceled that same day.

== Impact ==
=== Mariana Islands ===
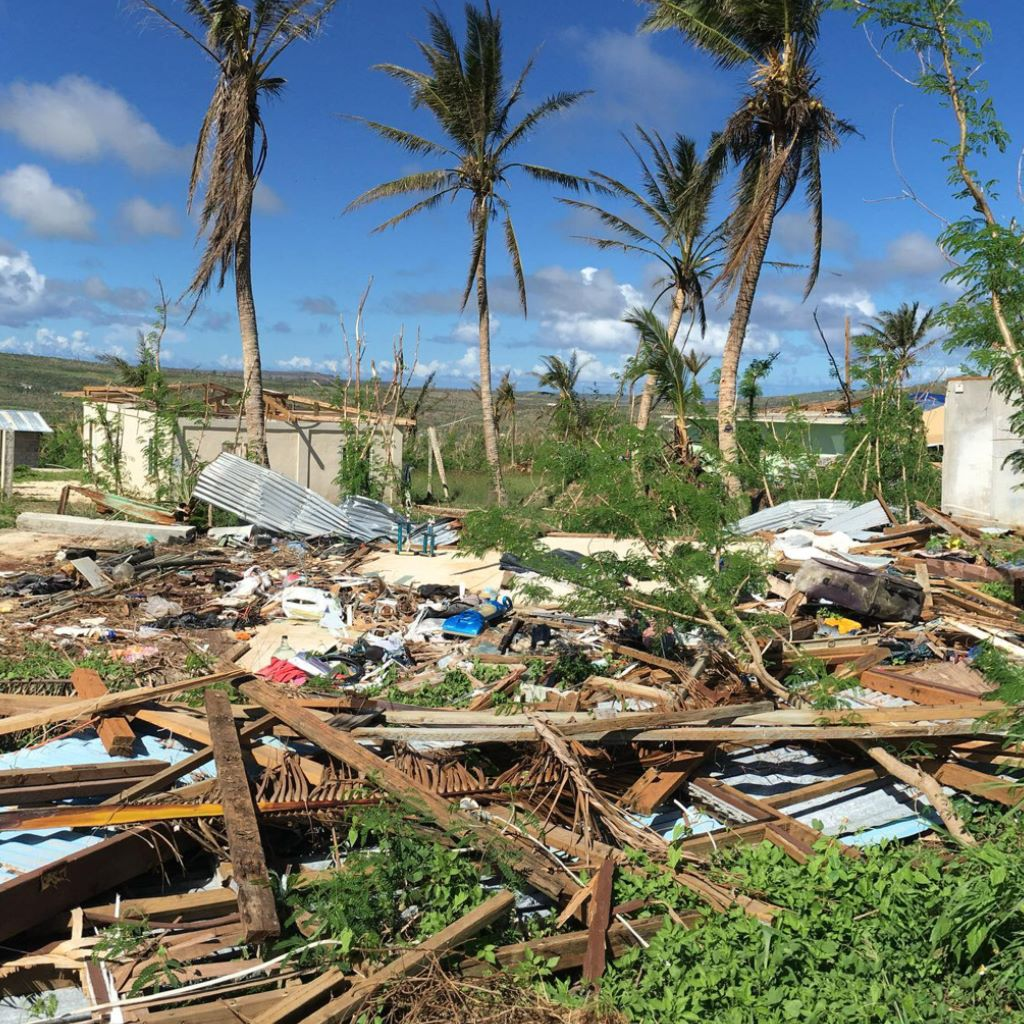
Damage and debris on Tinian after Typhoon Yutu

Striking Tinian and Saipan on October 24 as a Category 5-equivalent super typhoon, Yutu became the strongest tropical cyclone to ever impact the Mariana Islands and the second-strongest to strike the United States or its territories as a whole, tied with Typhoon Karen in 1962 and Hurricane Camille in 1969. Only the 1935 Labor Day hurricane impacted the country at a greater strength. Yutu was the strongest and worst storm to impact the Marianas since Typhoon Jean in 1968. Meteorologist Brandon Aydlett at the NWS described the typhoon as "the storm which sets the scale for which future storms are compared to". A joint study by the Guam NWS office and the University of Guam determined that sustained winds of 270 km/h (170 mph) with gusts of 320 km/h (200 mph) swept the two islands, based on weather instruments, damage to infrastructure and vegetation, and individual interviews to determine where the eye had passed. The highest wind gust was recorded at 170 km/h (100 mph) over Saipan at 14:44 UTC on October 24, before weather instruments across the island along with Tinian were damaged or destroyed. A resident recorded gusts of 270 km/h (168 mph) and an anemometer recorded a peak wind of 214 km/h (133 mph). Though 68 mm (2.66 in) of rain was observed at Saipan International Airport, it was likely well below the actual rainfall. A rain gauge measured 250 mm (10 in) of rain, though it was 4.8 km (3 mi) northeast of Yutu's eye. Maximum coastal flooding in Saipan and Tinian were measured at 9.1 m (30 ft) and 6.1 to 7.6 m (20 to 25 ft) respectively. Total damage in the Northern Mariana Islands was estimated to reach over $800 million, according to FEMA.

During the passage of Yutu, 121–133 people were injured. The typhoon also killed two people in Saipan: a 44-year-old woman in Chalan Kanoa when it wrecked the building she was inside, and another woman in Susupe from carbon monoxide poisoning caused by inhaling the fumes of a power generator. As Yutu battered the islands, sheet metals were carried by strong winds and water outages occurred in Saipan and Tinian. The power plants of Saipan and Tinian were destroyed, leaving the entirety of both islands without electricity; a large amount of transformers and conductors were downed. By the time the storm had passed, there were 779 downed poles in Saipan and 183 in Tinian. Across the commonwealth, utility infrastructure was severely impacted. By November 5, Governor Ralph Torres stated that over 3,000 homes were destroyed, leaving thousands homeless, while the American Red Cross reported that as many as 6,000 homes were destroyed and 12,000 were affected. Cell towers were significantly damaged as well. Two antenna farms from the U.S. Agency for Global Media were torn apart by the intense winds. Satellite dishes that down-linked Radio Free Asia and Voice of America were either fragmented or removed entirely. Roads and ports were rendered inaccessible due to debris. Seven public schools in Saipan and Tinian were severely damaged. The population of forest birds such as the golden white-eye, bridled white-eye, Mariana kingfisher, rufous fantail, and honeyeaters, was expected to decline after the storm.

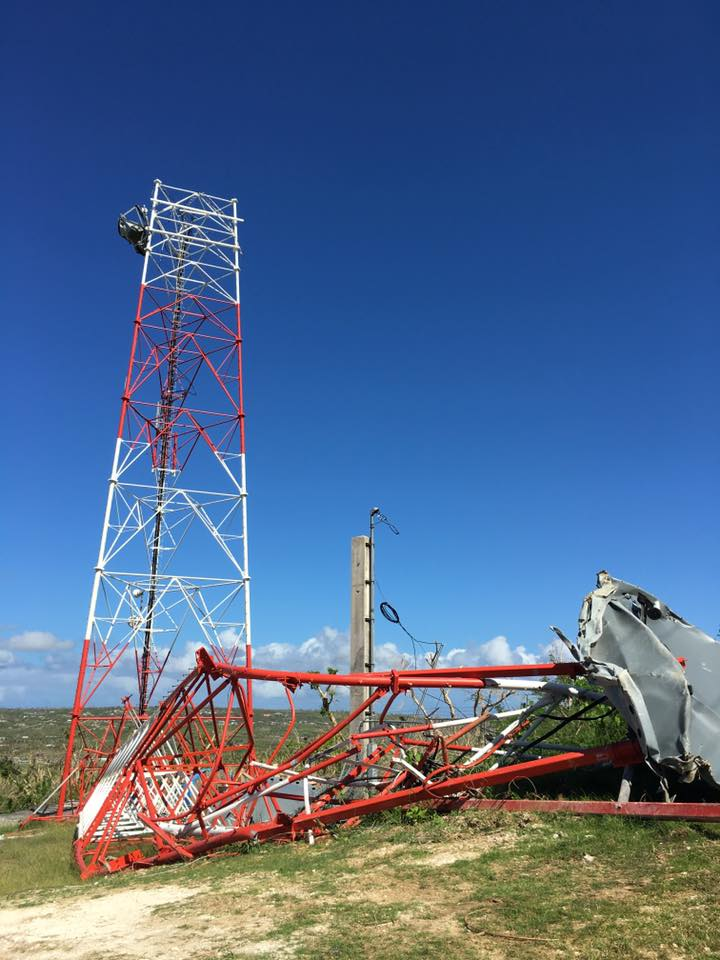
Damage to a communication tower on Tinian after Typhoon Yutu

On Saipan, most buildings at the southern side of the island lost their roofs or were destroyed. Some people were injured by glass and other debris, and cars were crushed under a collapsed garage. Many cars had their windshield and windows shattered by debris. Powerful winds dragged a container and crashed it into two police cars behind the Department of Public Safety building in Susupe. Additionally, many large trees were uprooted onto a road, though they were quickly relocated by authorities. Wooden power poles from As Terlaje to Laulau were toppled like dominoes, while concrete poles were slanted. Low-lying vegetation in southern parts of the island were shredded or ripped from the ground. Yutu's eyewall also knocked out Saipan's doppler weather radar on October 25, during the storm's landfall. The typhoon ruined Saipan's tourism industry, with four hotels on the southern area closed after sustaining significant damage and most flights to the island cancelled. Saipan International Airport sustained significant damage; terminals flooded and navigation aids were rendered inoperable. The runway was later opened only for humanitarian assistance at the time. The gymnasium and classrooms and buildings of Northern Marianas College had their tin roofs blown off, littering the place with bent metal and shattered glass. A fire hydrant by a traffic light near campus also busted, releasing gallons of water near vehicles. The revamped gymnasium of Marianas High School, which was previously damaged by Typhoon Soudelor, was destroyed. Hopwood Middle School, with 16 out of its 35 classrooms destroyed by Yutu, had the rest of them demolished by the public school system in place for a new campus. The Joeten-Kiyu Public Library was flooded after its roof got damaged, and its Ford Transit bookmobile was overturned by wind, damaging all 500 children's books that were inside and shattering its windshield.

Tinian Mayor Joey San Nicolas stated that the island had been devastated by Typhoon Yutu, reporting damage to critical infrastructure. Debris hindered access to crucial areas, including emergency shelters, Tinian International Airport, the command control shelter, and the islands only health center, the Tinian Health Clinic. The health center sustained major damage, though no patients were being treated at the time. The hospital's windows and doors were damaged, and the building was inundated. One person was injured in Tinian. Most homes on Tinian were severely damaged or destroyed. Some concrete structures sustained significant damage, a few completely destroyed, with residents reporting that those buildings shook during the typhoon. Storm shutters were torn from windows, leaving the interior of structures exposed to wind and water damage. In one instance, a door was ripped from a building and hurled 30 m (100 ft) into a pigsty. Some cars were smashed by debris and more were flipped over, and roads were covered in water. The airport also suffered significant damage, only remaining open to military planes at the time. Emergency responders rescued over 30 people, moving them to local schools used as emergency shelters. In San Jose, some generators whirred among flattened buildings, 30 m (100 ft) trees were uprooted, road signs were twisted, and laundry shook in crumpled homes. The village's church was also totaled by the storm.

Yutu brought typhoon-force winds over Rota, causing property and crop damage of $1 million each. Over 50 downed power poles were severely damaged or destroyed on the island. About 13 homes were destroyed and 38 were damaged across Songsong and Sinapalo. Rota Airport received debris along its runway. Guam endured tropical storm winds of 48–64 km/h (30–40 mph). The Guam Power Authority reported power outages over some parts of the island, and $500,000 worth of property damage occurred. On October 25, Andersen Air Force Base recorded a gust of 93 km/h (58 mph), while the NWS office recorded a peak gust of 85 km/h (53 mph). The highest rainfall from Yutu in Guam was recorded in Dededo at 1 in (25 mm). Crop damage was estimated at $250,000. Preliminary damage assessments were started shortly afterward by the Guam government, with the intent to determine whether any damaged businesses and farms needed assistance.

=== Philippines ===
Infrared satellite loop of Typhoon Yutu making landfall over Luzon on October 29

Throughout the Philippines, Yutu, locally named Rosita, killed 32 people and injured two others. The storm caused at least 11 landslides across Luzon. A total of 567,691 people were affected across 19 provinces, and 438,895 had been displaced. About 66,165 homes were damaged, with 6,603 destroyed, mostly across Cagayan Valley. 106 road sections and ten bridges were affected across three regions in Luzon. About 51 transmission lines were affected by Yutu, causing power outages throughout the island, though most power was quickly restored by October 31. The total amount of damage to agriculture was estimated at ₱2.904 billion (US$55.160 million), mostly to rice. As the storm passed through Luzon, the Ambuklao and Binga Dams in Benguet, the Magat Dam near Cagayan River, and the San Roque Dam in Pangasinan all released water. On October 29, both the highest wind gust of 130 km/h (81 mph) at 21:25 UTC and lowest sea-level pressure of 971.8 hPa (28.70 inHg) at 21:00 UTC were recorded at Casiguran, Aurora. Between 50 and 200 mm (2.0 and 7.9 in) of rain was estimated to have fallen over Northern Luzon, while 200 and 300 mm (7.9 and 11.8 in) of rain was estimated elsewhere in the island. As Yutu rapidly weakened, rainfall increased over the eastern side of Northern and Central Luzon, with surface observations suggesting that orographic lifting had amplified the rainfall. The highest 24-hour rainfall was measured in Baguio at 170 mm (6.7 in) on October 30, while the highest rainfall throughout the storm duration was measured in the same city at 177.8 mm (7.00 in).

Damaged homes in the Philippines due to Typhoon Yutu
Region	Partially damaged	Totally damaged	Total
Ilocos Region	244	23	267
Cagayan Valley	55,278	6,269	61,547
Central Luzon	644	31	675
Eastern Visayas	104	5	109
Cordillera Region	3,292	275	3,567
Total	59,562	6,603	66,165

Most deaths caused by Yutu occurred in Mountain Province, when 21 people died in Natonin after a landslide buried a Department of Public Works and Highways building. A rescuer also drowned trying to help victims of the landslide. Roads were rendered impassable throughout the town as well. Seven landslides at Kalinga closed roads across the province; a landslide had also killed a 5-year-old girl and injured two in a home. Two elementary schools in Tanudan were submerged in flooding. Another landslide damaged three classrooms and a library, and another had affected 10–15 hectares (25–37 acres) of rice fields. A footbridge had also been damaged by flooding. In Ifugao, four people died in a landslide at Banaue. A 22-year-old man in Aguinaldo drowned after being carried by a strong water current along with one of his companions who survived. In the province of Isabela, 56,715 homes were damaged, the most out of any province. A river near Roxas and Quirino rose rapidly, flooding low-lying areas. A truck on the Quirino Bridge overturned due to strong winds, causing traffic jams, and the bridge connecting Roxas and northern Isabela was damaged by flash flooding. Cauayan Airport was closed for two days after Yutu had blew off the roof of the passenger terminal. In Dinapigue, Isabela, where Yutu made landfall, several barangays were flooded and communication lines were cut off. A landslide in Kayapa blocked the Benguet–Nueva Vizcaya Road, while another occurred in Ambaguio. Fallen trees and debris destroyed graves in Gamu, Isabela.

About 3,000 graves were flooded in Dagupan. In San Clemente, Tarlac, a man died after being electrocuted while trying to help another who fell off a motorcycle near a toppled utility pole. A rockslide in Baler, Aurora blocked the main highway to Casiguran. In Calabarzon, a fishing boat carrying three fishermen capsized due to big waves near Perez, Quezon; one of them was reported missing before being declared dead by drowning. Strong winds alongside big waves battered Tagkawayan and destroyed nine homes in General Nakar. Two people died from a landslide at a quarry site in Batangas. In Eastern Visayas, 109 homes were destroyed in Northern Samar, including at least 10 in Pambujan that were impacted by waves reaching 3 to 5 m (9.8 to 16.4 ft) and 12 in Mapanas from storm surges. In Gamay, big waves affected several resorts.

=== Hong Kong ===
On October 31, a 25-year-old man died when surfing in Shek O Beach in Big Wave Bay, Hong Kong Island, due to high surf, while the standby typhoon signal No. 1 was hoisted. In Tai Miu Wan, maximum sea level during the storm's passage was measured at 2.78 m (9.1 ft) and a maximum storm surge was measured at 0.65 m (2.1 ft). Over the next two days, Yutu brought cloudy weather and light rain, and overall caused no significant damage in Hong Kong.

== Aftermath and retirement ==
Due to the severe damage in the Northern Mariana Islands, the name Yutu was retired during the 52nd annual session of the ESCAP/WMO Typhoon Committee in February 2020. In February 2021, the Typhoon Committee subsequently chose Yinxing as its replacement name, and was first used in 2024.

After causing over ₱1 billion worth of damages in the Philippines, PAGASA retired the name Rosita from its rotating lists of tropical cyclone names, and will never be used again as a typhoon name within the Philippine Area of Responsibility. The name Rosal was chosen to replace Rosita, and it was first used in 2022 season.

=== Northern Mariana Islands ===
It’s like a small war just passed through.

— Gregorio Sablan, Congressional Delegate for the Northern Mariana Islands

Immediately following the typhoon's impact, the Congressional Delegate for the Northern Mariana Islands, Gregorio Sablan, made a request for aid. With the scale of destruction far exceeding Typhoon Soudelor in 2015, power was not expected to be fully restored for months. Emergency shelters quickly filled to capacity on both islands by October 25. The same day the U.S. Department of Health and Human Services declared a public health emergency for the affected areas and deployed 50 health personnel. President Trump signed a major disaster declaration on October 26, enabling the islands to receive federal funding. The same day, Matson, Inc. provided $125,000 in funds and deployed its vessel Mana loaded with bottled water and ice. On October 27, South Korea began airlifting approximately 1,000 stranded tourists from Saipan. Daytime operations at Saipan International Airport were resumed; however, damaged navigation equipment prevented safe operation during the night. The Coast Guard reopened the port of Saipan, allowing vessels to travel in and out of it. On October 29, Governor Ralph Torres signed an executive order postponing the 2018 Northern Mariana Islands gubernatorial election from November 6 to November 13, due to the effects of Yutu. Media coverage of the storm was criticized by the Poynter Institute and The Atlantic for being limited, calling out news outlets that focused more on Yutu's meteorological aspect rather than its destructive effects, echoing the coverage of the death toll due to Hurricane Maria.

The storm had displaced around 15,000 to 17,000 people, over a quarter of the Northern Mariana Islands population of 55,000. Federal responders provided over 1,700 tents instead of rental subsidies like they have done after Hurricanes Florence and Michael. The severe housing shortage caused FEMA to offer plane tickets out of the commonwealth, with 29 households booking tickets to Hawaii and other U.S. states. Over 3,600 people were eligible, though most of them decided to stay at the islands. Due to damaged schools, students did not have classes for over a month. Yutu had also crippled the tourism economy in the archipelago, with the islands receiving less than 6,000 visitors during November 2018, down from 48,000 last year. Car rentals, hotel and restaurant bookings, and souvenir shopping all were nearly halted during a time of usual peak tourism. The Marianas Visitors Authority reported that arrivals to the Northern Mariana Islands dropped by 88%. Yutu was among the contributing factors to worsening the economy, including the closure of marketing offices due to lack of funding.

Since health facilities were damaged throughout Saipan and Tinian, all patients were transported to a hospital operated by Commonwealth Healthcare Corporation (CHCC) in Saipan. Direct Relief sent emergency medical supplies to the hospital, including medical backpacks, over 40,000 water purification tablets, and oral rehydration therapy, as well as rugged tents. Moreover, the organization shipped an emergency health kit, which was enough to treat about 100 patients in 3 to 5 days. Basic personal care items were also shipped to those who were displaced. Team Rubicon USA sent a reconnaissance team to Guam to determine the needs across the Northern Mariana Islands with local officials. Their Emergency Medical Team (EMT) was integrated into the Tinian's health center's medical system, treating 36 homebound patients across southern Tinian. The organization also conducted storm shelter health assessments in cooperation with the World Health Organization and the CHCC. About 112 people were treated by Team Rubicon's EMT. AmeriCares also deployed its medical teams, delivering 3,600 kg (4 short tons) of medicine and supplies. The Saipan hospital was flooded with twice as many patients as on a regular day, with nearly half of them being uninsurable as guest workers, undocumented immigrants, or citizens of Pacific island nations ineligible for Medicaid. Esther Muna, the chief executive officer of the hospital, reported some patients had post-traumatic stress disorder and depression and a recent surge of storm-related suicides. Yutu also reverted the goal of providing 24-hour water to every village on Saipan achieved in September. A medical team of 26 led by Sheryl Dority, a nurse for Intermountain Healthcare from South Jordan, Utah, operated for three weeks until November 7, after treating more than 1,400 patients for cleanup-related injuries.

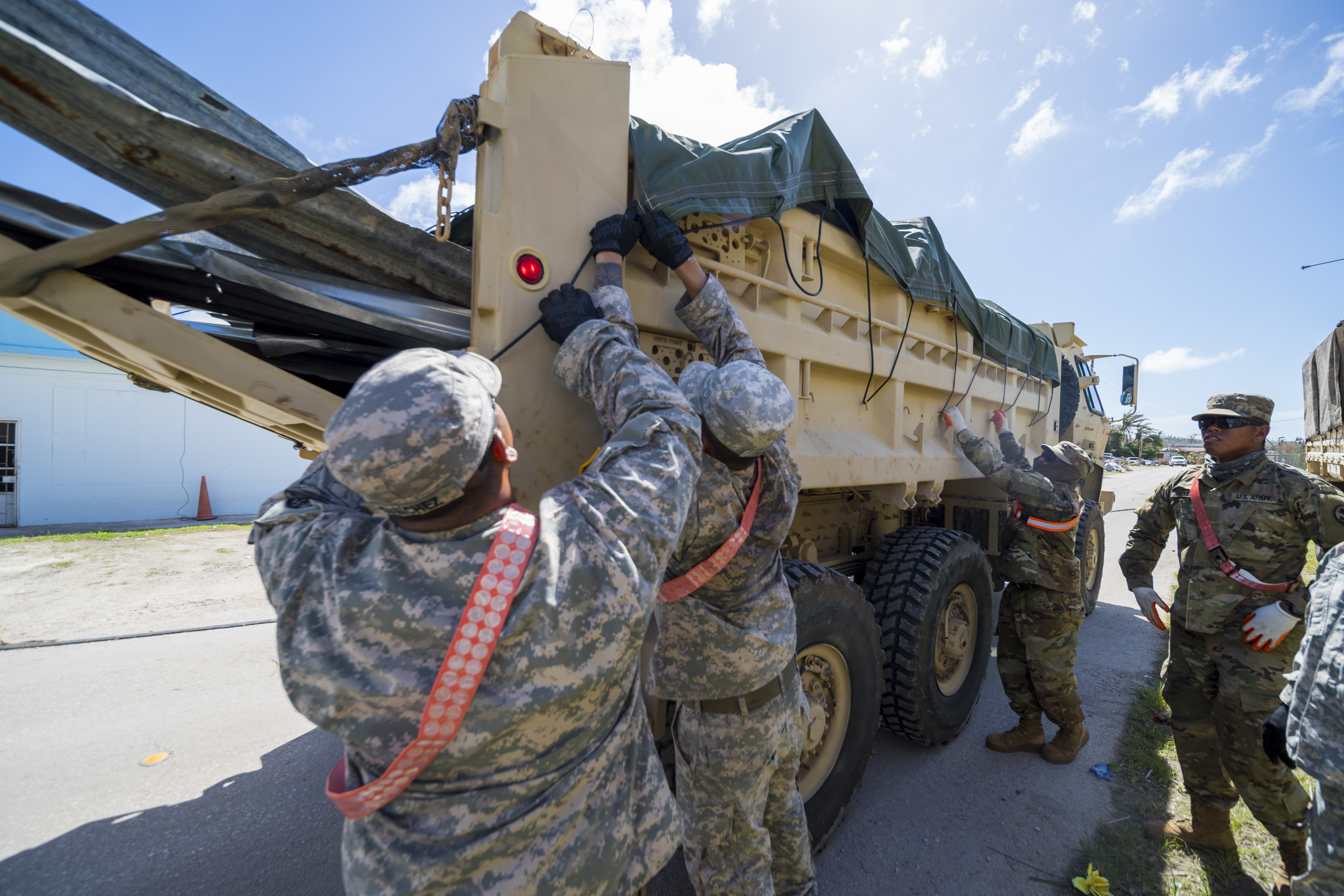
Guam Army National Guard prepared for the relief efforts of Typhoon Yutu

In accordance with changes implemented after Hurricane Maria in 2017, FEMA established specific task forces to handle smaller scale facets of the recovery: transportation, communications, food and water, and energy and fuel. A damage assessment was then conducted by FEMA alongside the Small Business Administration (SBA) on October 28. The Red Cross coordinated with FEMA in sending staff and supplies, despite difficulties due to damaged airports, while supporting government-run shelters with food and water. Other supplies including buckets, tarps, charging devices, stoves, lanterns, and sanitation supplies were sent to over 10,000 households. The Red Cross also helped in family reunification with satellite-equipped vehicles and assisted deployed service members. FEMA and the Red Cross established five relief distribution sites on the island. Overall, more than 900 people were assisted by the local government, Red Cross, and The Salvation Army.

The neighboring island of Guam also provided relief, sending its engineers from the Guam Power Authority to help repair power outages and reserve water. The island's Homeland Security/Office of Civil Defense were to lead local government efforts in cleaning debris or restoring utilities, according to Guam Governor Eddie Baza Calvo. Around 140 guardmen from the Guam Army National Guard were expected to arrive and begin duty on Saipan for approximately 60 days. The Army Guard's 1224th Engineer Support Company was set to assist along with the United States Indo-Pacific Command and FEMA. In Tinian, two generators were used, one for powering a water well and for pumping water into the island's health center, and the other for powering the only hospital on the island; power remained completely offline throughout Tinian. The USCGC Sequoia and USCGC Kiska ported in Guam sailed for Saipan and Tinian, respectively, with relief supplies. A year after Yutu, about 546 roofs were repaired, 2,744 temporary tents and 66 temporary classrooms were established, 193 shipping containers removed 165,051 m^{3} (215,879 cu yd) of debris, and 2,144 concrete power poles were installed. Additionally, FEMA's Volunteer Agencies Leading and Organizing Repairs (VALOR) program completed 94 projects, and the SBA provided $97.4 million. In total, over 170 volunteers from 25 U.S. states and Canada were brought to repair homes. FEMA gave $42.057 million for individual and household programs, with 6,960 applications approved, $283.570 million in public assistance, and $10.632 million for hazard mitigation throughout the Northern Mariana Islands.

=== Philippines ===
Yutu disrupted the recovering process in areas previously affected by Typhoon Mangkhut. A state of calamity was declared in the municipalities of Mayoyao and Lamut in Infugao, Barlig in Mountain Province, and the province of Quirino. The Department of Social Welfare and Development increased food packs worth ₱17.712 million (US$336,337.24) for the Ilocos Region, Cagayan Valley, and the CAR, and increased non-food items worth ₱3.559 million (US$67,592.16) for Cagayan Valley and the CAR. The Department of Health mobilized its emergency response teams to Natonin on October 31, and distributed food and nutrition. The Department of Public Works and Highways moved its assets to four regions for road clearing operations. The Department of Information and Communications Technology provided communication equipment to the National Disaster Risk Reduction and Management Council. The Department of Education reported class suspensions, while schools were used for shelter. The Bureau of Fire Protection deployed 473 fire trucks, 17 ambulances, 4 rescue vehicles, and 883 personnel.

The Philippine Red Cross assisted in rescue and cleanup operations, while also allocating food and relief items. Members of the Armed Forces of the Philippines rescued people who were stranded in Roxas, Isabela, and also deployed six teams totaling 63 personnel. United Nations agencies, international and national non-governmental organizations, and the private sector had operated in the affected regions since Typhoon Mangkhut, beginning rapid damage assessments. Evacuation centers in Itogon, Benguet needed food, water, blankets, sleeping mats, and hygiene equipment. CARE initiated its emergency response team to coordinate with local authorities while providing immediate relief. As ACT Alliance continued its assessment, the National Council of Churches in the Philippines revised its response to Typhoon Mangkhut to increase the needs for the affected families, jointly implementing projects with Christian Aid. President Rodrigo Duterte started an aerial inspection over the affected areas, urging government officials for a "return to normalcy as soon as possible." In a meeting, President Duterte criticized unidentified government agencies for no maintenance of government vehicles.

== See also ==
- Weather of 2018
- Tropical cyclones in 2018
- List of typhoons in the Mariana Islands
- Typhoon Karen (1962) – Devastated Guam in a similar fashion.
- Typhoon Lynn (1987) – Hit the Marianas and skirted through Luzon.
- Typhoon Hagibis (2019) – Also affected the Marianas as it was rapidly intensifying.
- Typhoon Mawar (2023) – A Category 5-equivalent typhoon that passed near Guam, bringing strong winds in that area.
- Typhoon Sinlaku (2026) – Next Category 5 typhoon to strike Saipan and Tinian.
