= Courts of Guam =

The law courts of Guam include:

Local courts

- Judicial Council of Guam
  - Superior Court of Guam
    - Supreme Court of Guam

Federal courts

- District Court of Guam

== History ==
The Guam Organic Act of 1950, signed by President Harry S. Truman, made Guam an unincorporated territory of the United States and established the District Court of Guam. The Judiciary Act that same year established the Island Court of Guam and the Police Court. The District Court had jurisdiction over local cases and certain federal cases, and was the court of appeals for the lower courts. Appeals of its decisions went first to the United States Court of Appeals for the Ninth Circuit, then to the Supreme Court of the United States.

Twenty-four years later, the Guam Legislature passed the Court Reorganization Act of 1974, creating the Superior Court of Guam, which absorbed the Island Court and Police Court; the judges of the latter two courts became Superior Court judges. The Superior Court took over responsibility for all cases based on Guam laws, while the District Court became simply an appellate court. The number of Superior Court judges was increased to seven and more courts were created to meet expanding needs:

- Family Court (1987)
- Juvenile Drug Court (2002)
- Adult Drug Court (2004)
- Mental Health Court (2009)
- DWI Court (2011)

The 1974 act also created the first Supreme Court of Guam, but the United States Supreme Court ruled in Territory of Guam v. Olsen (1977) that the Organic Act did not grant sufficient authority to do so, and the Supreme Court was abolished. On December 31, 1992, Guam Legislature unanimously passed Public Law 21-147, which reestablished the Supreme Court.

In January 2006, the Ninth Circuit Court dismissed the case of Santos v. Guam, signifying that it no longer had jurisdiction of appeals from Guam courts; only the United States Supreme Court does.

"The Judicial Council of Guam is the governing body of the Judiciary of Guam. Pursuant to law, it is composed of all full-time Justices of the Supreme Court, the Presiding Judge of the Superior Court, and an appointed Superior Court Judge."
