= Maria Teresa B. Cenzon =

Guamanian judge

Judge of the Superior Court of Guam
- Incumbent
- Assumed office December 20, 2012

Personal details
- Born: Maria Teresa Bonifacio Cenzon Guam
- Education: Marquette University (BA); Loyola University Chicago (JD)

Maria Teresa Bonifacio Cenzon is a judge of the Superior Court of Guam.

== Education ==
Cenzon received her Bachelor of Arts from Marquette University and her Juris Doctor from the Loyola University Chicago School of Law.

== Legal career ==
Cenzon began her career as a law clerk at Barcinas & Terlaje. She later joined the law firm of Mair, Mair, Spade & Thompson, and became a partner. In 2008, she joined Cabot Mantanona as a partner and in 2009 she became of counsel for Carlsmith Ball. She previously served as Chief Legal Counsel to the Governor of Guam. In April 2010 she was named Director of Policy, Planning & Community Relations for the Unified Judiciary of Guam.

== Judicial career ==
=== Superior Court of Guam ===
On September 11, 2012, Governor Eddie Baza Calvo appointed Cenzon to be a Judge of the Superior Court of Guam. She received a unanimous vote in the 31st Guam Legislature and was sworn in on December 20, 2012.

=== Failed nomination to federal district court ===
On November 13, 2020, President Donald Trump announced his intent to nominate Cenzon to serve as a judge for the District Court of Guam. On November 30, 2020, her nomination was sent to the Senate. President Trump nominated Cenzon to the seat being vacated by Judge Frances Tydingco-Gatewood, whose term expired on August 4, 2016. On January 3, 2021, her nomination was returned to the President under Rule XXXI, Paragraph 6 of the United States Senate. Later that same day, her renomination was sent to the Senate. President Joe Biden withdrew her nomination on February 4, 2021.
