= Cristobal C. Duenas =

American judge (1920–2010)

Senior Judge of the District Court of Guam
- In office January 1988 – January 31, 1991

Judge of the District Court of Guam
- In office December 11, 1969 – January 1988
- Appointed by: Richard Nixon; Jimmy Carter (reappointment)

Personal details
- Born: Cristobal Camacho Duenas; September 12, 1920 Hagåtña, Guam
- Died: February 14, 2010 (aged 89)
- Spouse: Juanita Calvo Duenas
- Education: Aquinas College; University of Michigan Law School (JD)

Cristobal Camacho Duenas (September 12, 1920 – February 14, 2010) was a Guamanian lawyer and judge who served on the District Court of Guam from 1969 until taking senior status in 1988. He remained a senior judge until his retirement in 1991. Duenas, who had previously served as a judge of the Island Court of Guam, was the first Chamorro appointed to a federal court bench.

== Early life, education, and career ==
Born in Hagåtña, Guam, to Jose C. Duenas and Concepcion C. Duenas, he lived through the Japanese occupation of Guam during World War II, later recalling in a 1996 interview that his brother Eduardo had been beheaded by Japanese officers during the occupation. He received an A.B. from Aquinas College in Grand Rapids, Michigan, in 1950, and a J.D. from the University of Michigan Law School in 1952. While in his first year of law school, he learned that the Guam Organic Act of 1950 had made him a United States citizen.

Duenas gained admission to the bar in Guam in 1953, and worked as an assistant to the Attorney General of Guam until 1957, when he was appointed director of the Guam Department of Land Management, where he remained until 1960.

== Judicial service ==
In 1960, Duenas became a judge of the Island Court of Guam, a predecessor of the Superior Court of Guam, serving on that court until 1969. On December 11, 1969, President Richard Nixon appointed Duenas to a seat on the District Court of Guam, to which Duenas was sworn in on December 24, 1969. His appointment made him the first Chamorro to serve on a federal court bench.

During his tenure on the District Court, Duenas presided over several prominent cases, including the federal corruption trial of former Guam governor Ricardo Bordallo, an antitrust action involving the Guam International Airport Authority and Duty Free Shoppers, and litigation brought by hospital employees against Guam Memorial Hospital. Duenas was subsequently reappointed to the court by President Jimmy Carter in 1978, and the enactment of Public Law 98-454 extended his term another two years, making his second appointment a 10-year term, expiring May 1988. He took senior status in January 1988, and resigned from the court on January 31, 1991.

== Personal life and death ==
Duenas was married to Juanita Calvo Duenas, with whom he had four sons and two daughters.

Active in civic and Roman Catholic organizations in Guam, Duenas assisted in establishing the first Guam council of the Knights of Columbus in 1968, and served as its first Grand Knight and as a charter Faithful Navigator. He was also president of the Society of Saint Vincent de Paul in Guam from the late 1950s into the early 1960s. In 1996, Pope John Paul II named Duenas a Knight of the Order of St. Sylvester and a Knight of the Order of St. Gregory the Great.

Duenas died at the age of 89, and later that month, the Legislature of Guam adopted a resolution memorializing him and recognizing his judicial career and contributions to Guam:

Relative to Memorializing and Acknowledging the Accomplishments of the Late Honorable Cristobal Camacho Duenas, the First Chamorro Appointed to a Federal Court Bench and to Expressing Un Dangkolo Na Si Yu'os Ma' Ase for His Great Contribution to the People of Guam, and Offering Condolences to His Family.

Political offices
Preceded by Paul D. Shriver	Judge of the District Court of Guam; 1969–1991	Succeeded by John S. Unpingco
