= Cenzon =

Cenzon is a surname. Notable people with the surname include:

- Carlito Joaquin Cenzon (1939–2019), Filipino Roman Catholic bishop
- Maria Teresa B. Cenzon, Guamanian judge
