= Robert Torres (judge) =

American lawyer and judge

Chief Justice of the Guam Supreme Court
- In office January 17, 2023 – January 20, 2026
- Preceded by: Philip Carbullido
- Succeeded by: Katherine Maraman
- In office January 21, 2014 – January 17, 2017
- Preceded by: Philip Carbullido
- Succeeded by: Katherine Maraman
- In office January 15, 2008 – January 18, 2011
- Preceded by: Philip Carbullido
- Succeeded by: Philip Carbullido

Justice of the Guam Supreme Court
- Incumbent
- Assumed office January 16, 2004
- Appointed by: Carl Gutierrez
- Preceded by: Peter Siguenza

Personal details
- Born: Guam
- Spouse: Mary Camacho
- Relatives: Felix Camacho (brother-in-law); Carlos Camacho (father-in-law); Lourdes Perez Camacho (mother-in-law)
- Education: University of Notre Dame (BA); Harvard University (JD)

Robert J. Torres Jr. is a Guamanian judge. He has served as the chief judge of the Supreme Court of Guam, a position he has held on three occasions, 2008 to 2011, 2014 to 2017, and since 2023.

== Life ==
Torres was born and raised on Guam and studied accounting at University of Notre Dame, graduating in 1980. He earned a Juris Doctor from Harvard Law School. His wife is Mary Camacho Torres, a Republican senator in the Guam Legislature.

Legal offices
Preceded by Peter Siguenza	Justice of the Guam Supreme Court; 2004–present	Incumbent
Preceded by Philip Carbullido	Chief Justice of the Guam Supreme Court; 2008–2011	Succeeded by Philip Carbullido
Preceded by Philip Carbullido	Chief Justice of the Guam Supreme Court; 2014–2017	Succeeded by Katherine Maraman
Preceded by Philip Carbullido	Chief Justice of the Guam Supreme Court; 2023–2026	Succeeded by Katherine Maraman
