= John S. Unpingco =

Guamanian lawyer and judge (1950–2023)

- Unpingco as judge of the District Court of Guam

Judge of the District Court of Guam
- In office October 9, 1992 – April 30, 2004
- Appointed by: George H. W. Bush
- Preceded by: Cristobal C. Duenas
- Succeeded by: Frances Tydingco-Gatewood

Personal details
- Born: July 1, 1950 Barrigada, Guam
- Died: October 11, 2023 (aged 73)
- Spouse: Annie Flores Borja Unpingco
- Education: Saint Louis University (BA); New York University (MBA, JD); Georgetown University (LLM)

John Sablan Unpingco (July 1, 1950 – October 11, 2023) was a Guamanian lawyer and judge who served as the chief judge of the District Court of Guam from 1992 to 2004.

== Early life, education, and career ==
Born in Barrigada, Guam, to Mr. and Mrs. Juan Unpingco, Unpingco attended Father Dueñas Memorial School and received a B.A. in history and political science, magna cum laude, from Saint Louis University in 1972.

At the time of his graduation, Unpingco was a second lieutenant in the United States Air Force Reserve and was preparing to attend law school at New York University. He received his Juris Doctor from the New York University School of Law in 1976, as well as a Master of Business Administration from New York University. He later earned a Master of Laws, specializing in international law, from Georgetown University Law Center in 1983.

Following law school in 1976, Unpingco joined the Oakland, California, law firm Ferenz, Bramhall, Williams and Gruskin as an associate. After the firm merged with Carlsmith, Wichman, Case and Mukai, he practiced corporate law in the firm's Guam office. Also in 1976, he began a long affiliation with the University of Guam, serving as an instructor with the College of Liberal Arts and Social Sciences.

Unpingco later served on active duty as a judge advocate in the United States Air Force, where his work included prosecuting cases. His international-law assignments included work in the United Kingdom involving British labor law, taxation and customs, and in Japan involving telecommunications law. From 1987 to 1992, he was command counsel at the Naval Air Warfare Center at China Lake, California.

== Judicial service ==
On July 22, 1992, President George H. W. Bush nominated Unpingco to a ten-year term on the District Court of Guam, to the seat vacated by the resignation of Judge Cristobal C. Duenas. The Senate Judiciary Committee held a hearing on his nomination on September 24, at which Guam delegate Ben Blaz introduced him. The committee ordered his nomination reported favorably on October 2, and the Senate confirmed him by unanimous consent on October 8. He received his commission the following day. His investiture was held on December 22, 1992, at the court's then-location in the Pacific Daily News Building.

During his tenure, Unpingco undertook an eight-year effort to obtain improved facilities for the District Court, which moved into a new courthouse on Marine Corps Drive in Hagåtña, Guam, on July 5, 2000. He also sought the establishment of a permanent full-time United States magistrate judge position for Guam, which had not previously been included in the federal magistrate system. Joaquin V. E. Manibusan Jr. was sworn in as Guam's first full-time U.S. magistrate judge in February 2004. While serving on the court, Unpingco continued his association with the University of Guam, serving as an assistant professor in its School of Business and Public Administration from 1995 to 2000.

Unpingco resigned from the District Court effective April 30, 2004. In 2009, Guam delegate Madeleine Bordallo introduced H.R. 910, a private bill to grant Unpingco a full judicial annuity, citing disparities between the retirement treatment of fixed-term territorial judges as compared to Article III federal judges.

== Later career ==
After leaving the bench, Unpingco served as administrator of the Guam Office of Veterans Affairs, in which capacity, he obtained federal funding for improvements to the Guam Veterans Cemetery, including a $3.2 million grant for expansion announced in 2013.

In August 2023, Unpingco returned to the University of Guam as an associate professor in the School of Business and Public Administration, only months before his death.

== Personal life and death ==
Unpingco was married to Annie Flores Borja Unpingco, with whom he had three children. He died on October 11, 2023, at the age of 73. A state funeral was held for him at the Guam Legislature later that month. He was interred at Our Lady of Peace Memorial Gardens in Yona, Guam.

Political offices
Preceded by Cristobal C. Duenas	Judge of the District Court of Guam; 1992–2004	Succeeded by Frances Tydingco-Gatewood
