= Katherine Maraman =

American judge

Chief Justice of the Guam Supreme Court
- Incumbent
- Assumed office January 20, 2026
- Preceded by: Robert Torres
- In office January 17, 2017 – January 21, 2020
- Preceded by: Robert Torres
- Succeeded by: Philip Carbullido

Justice of the Guam Supreme Court
- Incumbent
- Assumed office February 21, 2008
- Appointed by: Felix P. Camacho
- Preceded by: Frances Tydingco-Gatewood

Personal details
- Born: 1951 (age 74–75) Los Alamos, New Mexico, U.S.
- Education: Colorado College (BA); University of New Mexico (JD)

Katherine Ann Maraman (born 1951) is an American judge who has been a member of the Supreme Court of Guam since 2008, serving as the court's chief justice since January 2026. She previously served as chief justice from 2017 to 2020, becoming the first female chief justice on the island and across Micronesia.

== Early life and education ==
Katherine Maraman was born in Los Alamos, New Mexico, in 1951. Her mother had immigrated to the United States from Ireland, settling first in Chicago before moving to the southwest. Maraman graduated from Los Alamos High School in 1969, then Colorado College, where she graduated in 1973 with a degree in economics.

Having graduating from the University of New Mexico School of Law in 1976, after working briefly at the New Mexico Legislative Council Service, she moved to Guam to work for a law firm there in 1977. She now describes the island as her adoptive home.

== Career ==
After beginning her career at a Guamanian law firm in the mid-1970s, Maraman subsequently served as a legal advisor to the Legislature of Guam and to Governor Joseph Franklin Ada. Then, beginning in 1994, she was appointed to the Superior Court of Guam, where she served for 14 years. During her time at the Superior Court, she primarily focused on family court cases.

Then, in 2008, she was appointed by Governor Felix Perez Camacho to serve on the Supreme Court of Guam. She served a term as chief justice from 2017 to 2020. After six years as an associate justice, she was re-installed for a second three-year term as chief justice in 2026.

On her election in 2017, she became Guam's first female chief justice. As a justice, her work has included efforts to improve how the courts handle mental health.

Maraman concurrently serves part-time as an associate judge on the Supreme Court of Palau. She also teaches as an adjunct professor at the University of Guam.

Legal offices
Preceded by Frances Tydingco-Gatewood	Justice of the Guam Supreme Court; 2008–present	Incumbent
Preceded by Robert Torres	Chief Justice of the Guam Supreme Court; 2017–2020	Succeeded by Philip Carbullido
Preceded by Robert Torres	Chief Justice of the Guam Supreme Court; 2026–present	Incumbent
