= Our Lady of the Visitation of Guibang =

Marian image of Gamu, Isabela

Our Lady of Guibang Nuestra Señora de Guibang
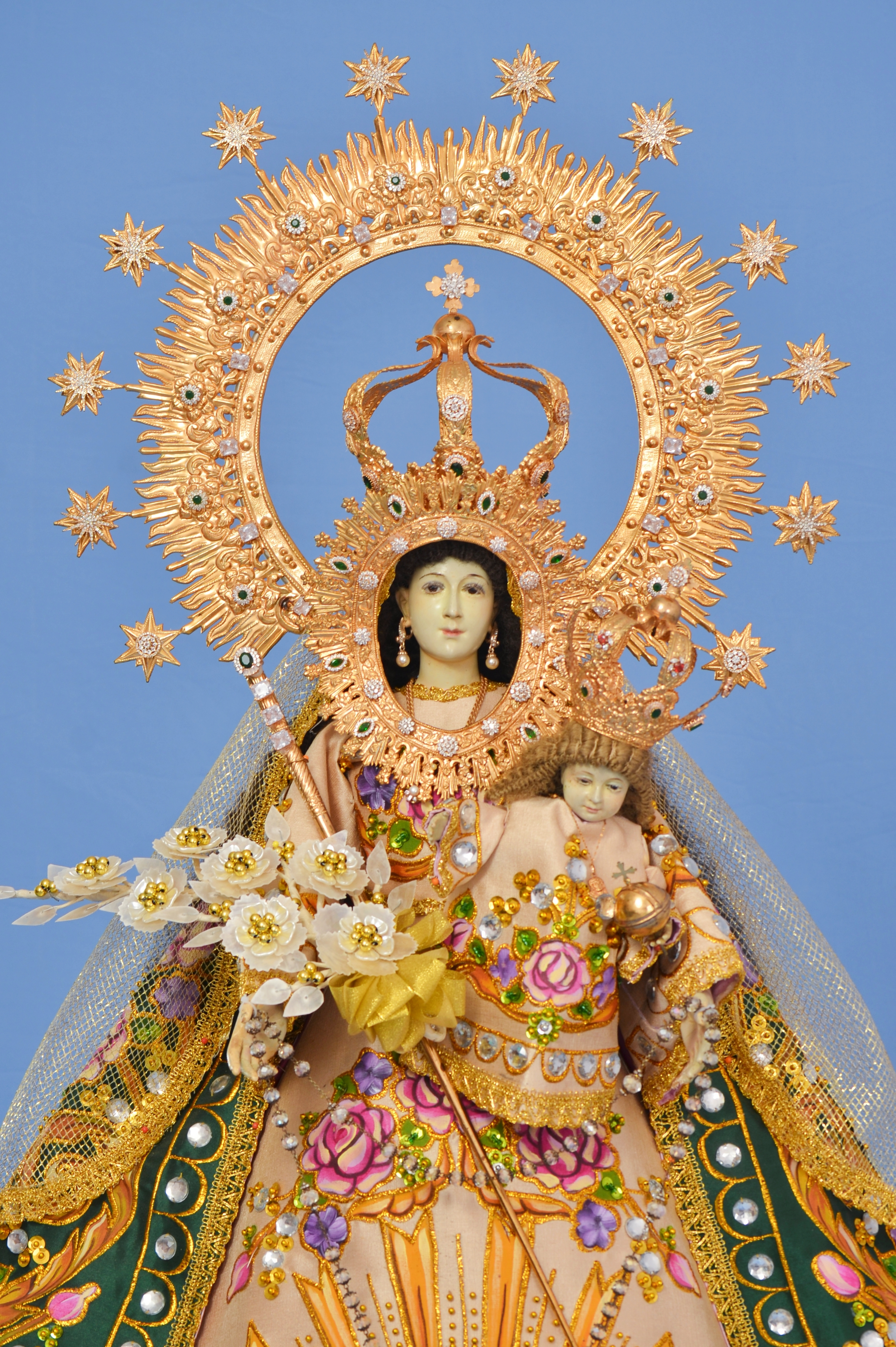
- The episcopally crowned image

Our Lady of the Visitation of Guibang Yena na Isabela Ina ti Isabela
- Venerated in: Roman Catholic Church
- Major shrine: National Shrine of Our Lady of the Visitation of Guibang in Brgy. Guibang, Gamu, Isabela
- Feast: July 2
- Attributes: Ivory statue
- Patronage: Isabela, Cagayan Valley

The Our Lady of the Visitation of Guibang (Spanish: Nuestra Señora de la Visitación de Guibang), is a 20th-century Roman Catholic title of the Blessed Virgin Mary associated with a Marian icon enshrined in the town of Gamu in the province of Isabela, Philippines. Considered miraculous, it is among the most venerated Marian images in northern Philippines. The statue received an episcopal coronation in 1973 and its chapel is a national shrine.

== History ==
=== Origin ===
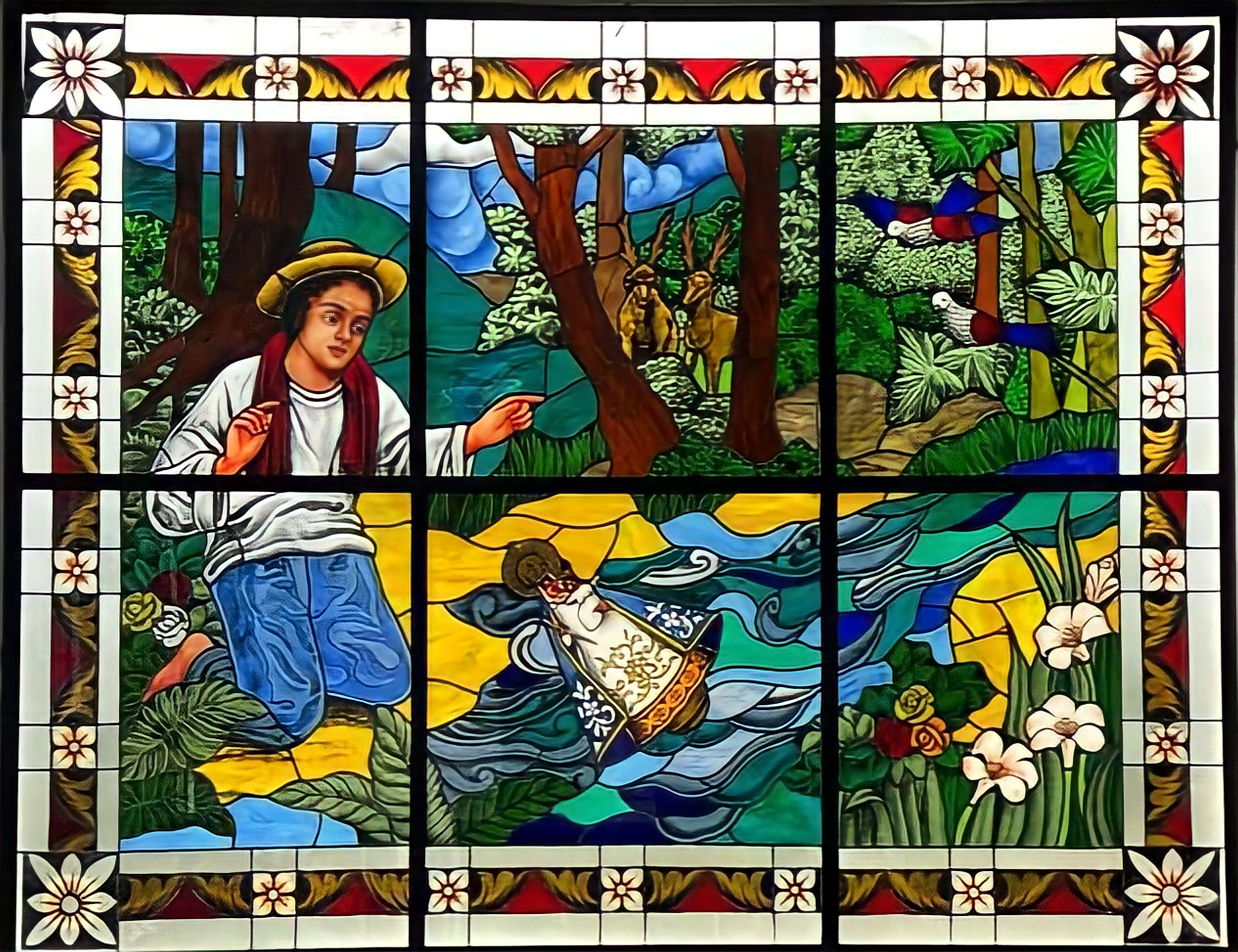
Stained glass depicting the finding of the image

The origins of the Virgin of Guibang can be traced to 1905, when a young man found the image floating near the riverbank of Barrio Guibang in Gamu, Isabela. He brought the image to the hut of a poor couple, Francisco Noble and María Noble, then asked them to pray the Rosary and practise doing Works of Mercy in honor of the Virgin. Through this mysterious yet lovely image, the couple's prayers were granted sometime later.

== Description ==
=== The image ===
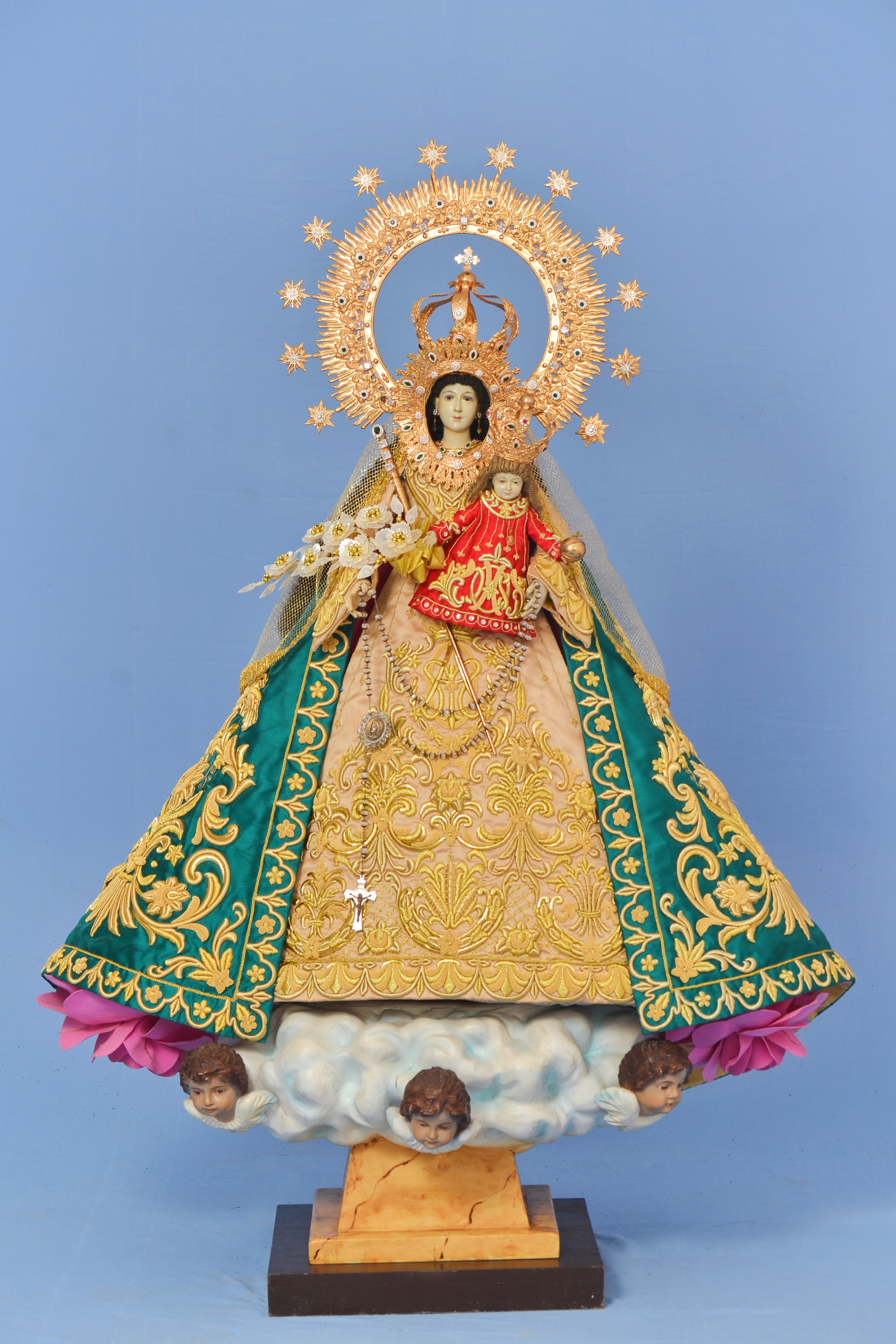
The full body of Our Lady of Guibang

The Virgin of the Visitation of Guibang is a statue in classic Philippine Colonial style: the faces are carved with Filipino features, while the de bastidor (frame) body holds up the dress ensemble. The Virgin and Child’s vestments are beaded and embroidered dresses and a manto (cape) for the Virgin, while the regalia consist of two crowns, and for her a rostrillo (face halo), Doce estrellas (twelve-star crown) and a sceptre. The Virgin is sometimes dressed with a veil under her crown.

The image is thought to be a replica of the 16th-century Virgin of the Visitation of Piat, hence both sharing the same feast day of 2 July (the pre-1969 date for the Feast of the Visitation).

The newly restored original and miraculous image of Our Lady of the Visitation of Guibang

== Miracles ==
After the image’s discovery and prayers of the Nobles answered, the couple wanted to bring the image with them on a journey. The image suddenly became too heavy to be carry, so the husband and wife took it as a sign the Virgin wished to remain in Guibang.

A few days after, the young man who had brought the image to the Nobles was able to carry it easily, and he brought it house to house in propagating the devotion. When another poor but pious couple was to receive the image, they were initially reluctant as they could not give alms for the visit. They eventually welcomed the Virgin to their humble abode, and on the night of the visit, the couple were amazed by a sweet fragrance. They discovered the odour exuded from the image, and news spread to the whole town. From then on, the image became popularly known as Our Lady of Guibang. As devotion to her grew a chapel was built to accommodate the growing number of pilgrims from other villages and towns in the province.

Other miracles attributed to the intercession of the Virgin of Guibang were locals frequently noting the strong scent of sampaguita, said to indicate her presence and continue to this day. Others would report the Virgin roams at night to visit devotees, since amorseco burrs would be found stuck to the image’s dresses in the daytime.

At midnight on 8 September 1972, the Feast of the Nativity of Mary, people were awakened by the loud pealing of bells they sensed came from the shrine. When a crowd came to investigate, the parish priest denied he rang the bells and said he had no memory of doing so beforehand.

Due to the numerous miracles continuously being reported and attested to by devotees for decades, the image was granted an episcopal coronation on 23 May 1973 at the close of the Diocesan Marian Congress. The ritual was held at St. Ferdinand College, beside Saint Ferdinand Cathedral in Ilagan, the capital of Isabela.

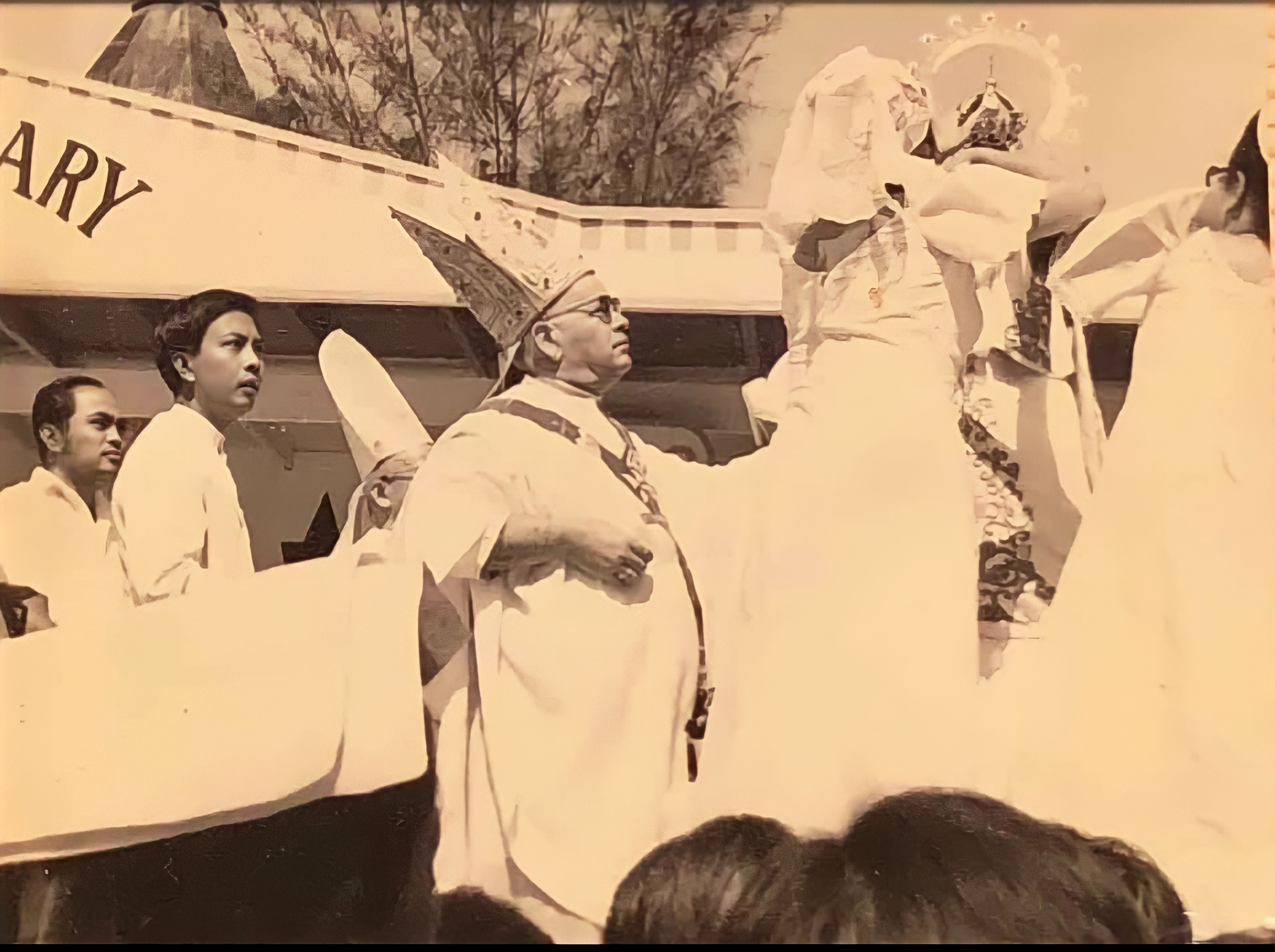
The Episcopal Coronation of Our Lady of the Visitation of Guibang by Most Rev. Cármine Rocco, Papal Nuncio to the Philippines, on May 26, 1973

Many pilgrims visit the Virgin’s shrine in Guibang and attest to more miracles from different illnesses and answered petitions. The love and devotion of the people of Isabela to Virgin has led her to be called the “Queen of Isabela Province”.

== Shrine ==
The image is housed in the National Shrine of Our Lady of the Visitation of Guibang (Filipino: Pambansáng Dambana at Parokya ng Mahál na Birhen ng Guibang; Spanish: Santuario Nacional y Parroquia de Nuestra Señora de la Visitación de Guibang), commonly known as Our Lady of Guibang Shrine, is in Barangay Guibang, Gamu along the Maharlika Highway.

The chapel to the Virgin of Guibang was elevated to the rank of national shrine on 13 February 1986. It comes alive every July when pilgrims visit to offer prayers during Our Lady's feast day.
