= National Shrine of Our Lady of the Visitation of Guibang =

Roman Catholic church in Isabela, Philippines

Our Lady of Guibang Shrine
- National Shrine of Our Lady of the Visitation of Guibang
- Pambansáng Dambana at Parokya ng Mahál na Birhen ng Guibang (Filipino); Santuario Nacional y Parroquia de Nuestra Señora de la Visitación de Guibang (Spanish)
- Location in Luzon Location in the Philippines
- 17°03′26″N 121°51′11″E
- Location: Brgy. Guibang, Gamu, Isabela
- Country: Philippines
- Denomination: Roman Catholic

History
- Former name: Our Lady of the Visitation of Guibang Chapel
- Status: National Shrine
- Founded: January 1986
- Founder(s): Most Rev. Miguel G. Purugganan, D.D.
- Dedication: Our Lady of the Visitation of Guibang
- Dedicated: 26 May 1973; 3 February 2023

Architecture
- Functional status: Active
- Architectural type: Church building

Specifications
- Materials: Brick, Sand, Stone, Gravel, Cement, Steel, Concrete

Administration
- Archdiocese: Tuguegarao
- Diocese: Ilagan

Clergy
- Archbishop: Most Rev. Ricardo L. Baccay, D.D
- Bishop: Most Rev. David William V. Antonio, D.D.

The National Shrine of Our Lady of the Visitation of Guibang, commonly known as Our Lady of Guibang Shrine, is a Roman Catholic parish church and pilgrimage site situated at Barangay Guibang, Gamu, Isabela, Philippines. The church enshrines the image of Our Lady of Guibang, and is under the jurisdiction of the Diocese of Ilagan.

The shrine is frequented by travellers on the Maharlika Highway, and comes alive every July when pilgrims visit for the image’s feast day. The pilgrim image of the Our Lady of the Visitation was episcopally crowned by Apostolic Nuncio to the Philippines Cármine Rocco on May 26, 1973, at the former Saint Ferdinand Cathedral (now Saint Ferdinand Parish Church) in Ilagan. The Catholic Bishops Conference of the Philippines at its 52nd Annual Bishop's Meeting held in Tagaytay in January 24–26, 1986 approved the petition of former Bishop of Ilagan Miguel Purugganan for the church to be made a National Shrine. The church was declared the Philippines’ eighth national shrine on February 13, 1986, and is the only one in the Ecclesiastical Province of Tuguegarao (comprising the Archdiocese of Tuguegarao and the dioceses of Ilagan and Bayombong).

The enlargement of the shrine began in the last quarter of 2018, with Masses and other activities temporarily held in the adjacent Poor Clare Monastery. The floor area was expanded from 750 square meters floor area to 1,100 square meters, and now holds around 750 seats and a full-standing area capacity of around 1,200. On February 3, 2023, Apostolic Nuncio to the Philippines Archbishop Charles John Brown joined clergy of the Diocese of Ilagan in blessing and dedicating the rebuilt and enlarged church.
