= Gamu =

Municipality in Isabela, Philippines

Gamu Santa Rosa de Gamút
- Municipality
- Municipality of Gamu
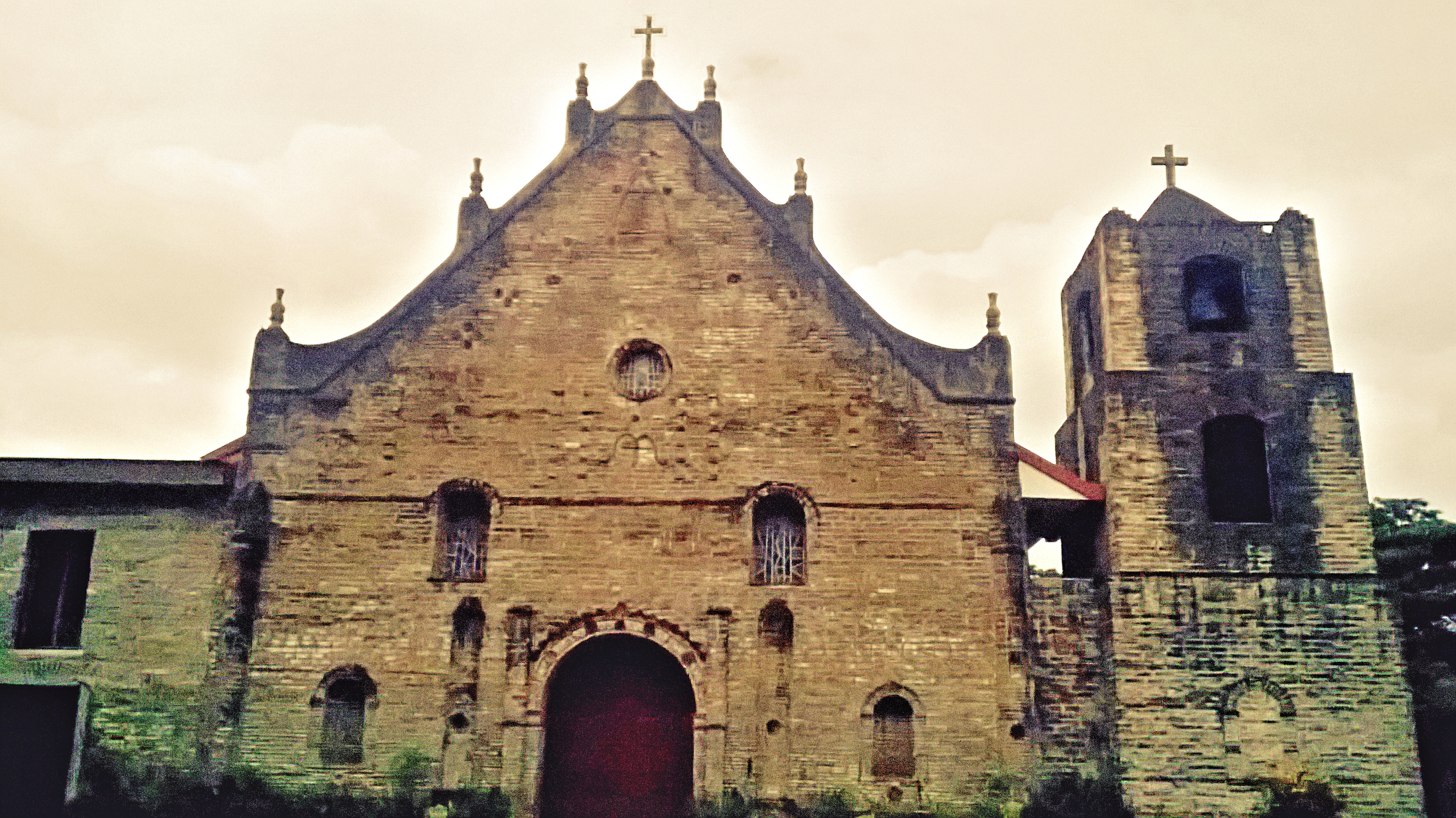
- Santa Rosa de Lima Church

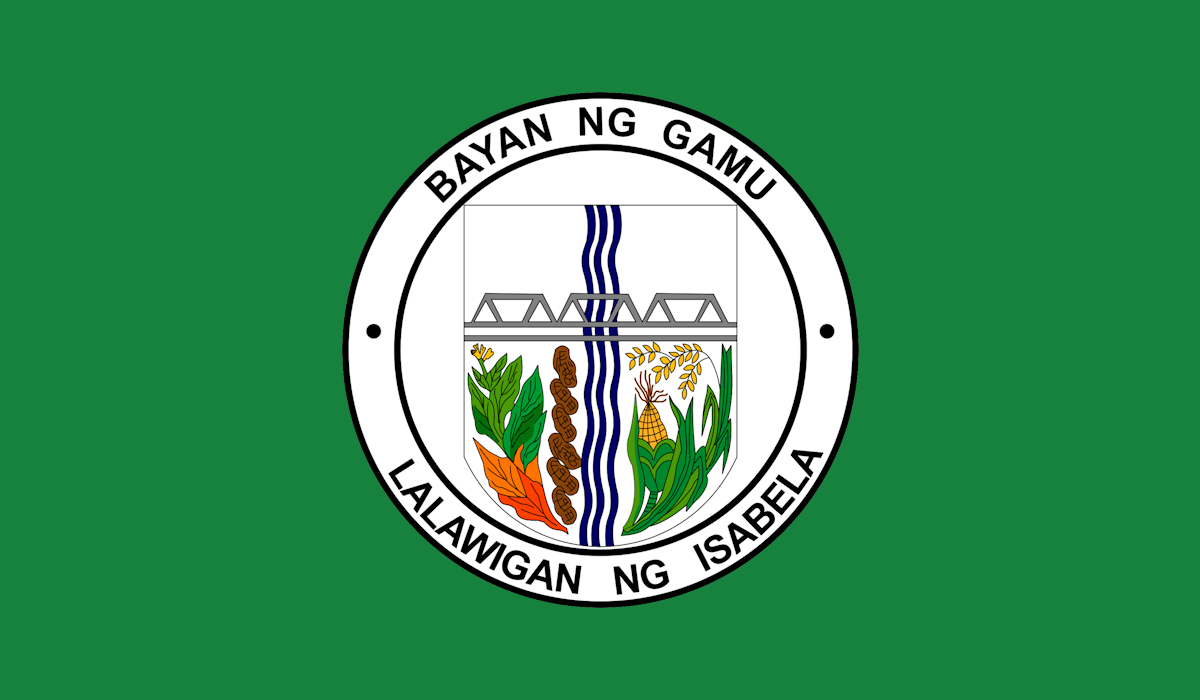
- Flag Seal
- Nicknames: Gateway to Mallig Plains; Mother Town of the 2nd District; Oldest Town of Mallig Plains
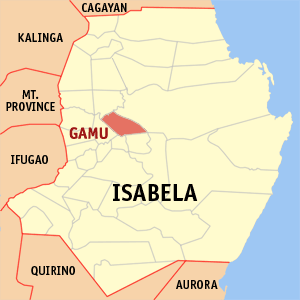
- Map of Isabela with Gamu highlighted
- Interactive map of Gamu
- Location within the Philippines
- Coordinates: 17°03′N 121°50′E
- Country: Philippines
- Region: Cagayan Valley
- Province: Isabela
- District: 2nd district
- Founded: December 5, 1741
- Barangays: 16 (see Barangays)

Government
  - Type: Sangguniang Bayan
  - Mayor: Xian-Al D. Galanza
  - Vice Mayor: Alfredo Burkley Jr.
  - Representative: Ed Christopher S. Go
  - Electorate: 20,313 voters (2025)

Area
  - Total: 129.40 km^{2} (49.96 sq mi)
- Elevation: 51 m (167 ft)
- Highest elevation: 89 m (292 ft)
- Lowest elevation: 29 m (95 ft)

Population (2024 census)
  - Total: 30,850
  - Density: 238.4/km^{2} (617.5/sq mi)
  - Households: 7,501

Economy
  - Income class: 2nd municipal income class
  - Poverty incidence: 12.21% (2023)
  - Revenue: ₱ 215.1 million (2024)
  - Assets: ₱ 636.6 million (2024)
  - Expenditure: ₱ 144.9 million (2024)
  - Liabilities: ₱ 171.1 million (2024)

Service provider
  - Electricity: Isabela 2 Electric Cooperative (ISELCO 2)
- Time zone: UTC+8 (PST)
- ZIP code: 3301
- PSGC: 0203113000
- IDD : area code: +63 (0)78
- Native languages: Ibanag; Ilocano; Tagalog
- Website: www.gamu-isabela.gov.ph

Gamu [gɐˈmu], officially the Municipality of Gamu (Ilocano: Ili ti Gamu; Tagalog: Bayan ng Gamu), is a municipality in the province of Isabela, Philippines. According to the 2024 census, it has a population of 30,850 people.

== Etymology ==
The name Gamu or gamu-t in ancient texts refers to the roots of tall grasses, akin to those of cogon grass, deeply embedded in the soil. Gamu was originally called 'Gamut', likely from a local plant whose roots were made into a type of medicine ('gamot'). From Fr. Jose Bugarin's Ibanag dictionary as follows:

"Gamu-t, root or stump [name] a town whose patroness is St. Rosa de Lima, under of the province of Cagayan until the year 1839, when the province of Nueva Vizcaya was established, and was added to it."

== History ==
Gamu was founded on December 5, 1741 as a result of the merging of the towns of Batavag (near present-day Lullutan in Ilagan) and Itugod (now barangay Lenzon). The town was established on its present site as a compromise for residents of the two towns and also the fact that both towns were too few in population to survive on their own. The population problem was later partially resolved through the forced settlement of conquered tribes into the town by the Spanish.

Originally part of the Cagayan Valley, Gamu was later annexed to Nueva Vizcaya when the province was established on May 24, 1856. Subsequently, on March 31, 1859, it became part of Isabela with the subdivision of Cagayan Valley and the creation of the Province of Isabela.

San Gabriel de Batauag, the first mission to Christianize the area, was established by Dominican missionaries in 1612, led by Father Luis Flores and his assistant, Fr. Juan de Sta Ana. The mission was initially situated in Batauag, now known as Lulutan, a barrio in Ilagan. However, due to grievances and maltreatment by the Spaniards, the natives of Batauag revolted, leading to the abandonment of the mission. In 1673, the mission was restored by Fr. Pedro Sánchez and Fr. Geronimo Ullos. Despite resistance from some natives, Fr. Pedro Jiménez, appointed as Ambassador of Peace, successfully persuaded many to settle in Cabagan and Itugod. Consequently, the towns of Cabagan, Itugod, and Santa Rosa de Gamu-t emerged from the original seven envisioned by the mission.

Santa Rosa de Gamu-t and Our Lady of Victories of Itugod merged on December 5, 1741, due to financial constraints, with Gamu serving as the central settlement. Fr. Martin Fernández constructed the church and planned the town, which was annexed to Gamu-t in 1774. In 1779, the two entities merged under the leadership of Fr. Sanin, with Gamu as the central seat of the mission.

Initially under the care of Dominican Fathers until 1922, Gamu saw a transition during the American Regime when Fr. Felix Domingo, a Filipino secular priest, took charge. The La Salette missionaries assumed responsibility for Gamu from 1962 to 1977.

In December 1949, an earthquake devastated the church and convent, leading to the construction of a wooden church in 1950-1951 adjacent to the ruins of the Spanish Church.

== Geography ==
Gamu is located in the central part of the province of Isabela with a total land area of 129.40 square kilometers. It is bounded on the north by the city of Ilagan, or the north-west by the municipality of Quirino, on the south by the municipality of Reina Mercedes and on the south-west by the municipality of Burgos, and on the Southeast by the municipality of Naguilian.

Gamu is situated 14.53 kilometres (9.03 mi) from the provincial capital Ilagan, and 430.56 kilometres (267.54 mi) from the country's capital Manila.

=== Barangays ===
Gamu is politically subdivided into 16 barangays. Each barangay consists of puroks while some have sitios. Currently, three of these are classified as urban barangays: District I, District II, and District III. The rest of the barangays are considered rural.

- Barcolan
- Buenavista
- Dammao
- District I (Poblacion)
- District II (Poblacion)
- District III (Poblacion)
- Furao
- Guibang
- Lenzon
- Linglingay
- Mabini
- Pintor
- Rizal
- Songsong
- Union
- Upi

=== Climate ===
Climate data for Gamu, Isabela
Month	Jan	Feb	Mar	Apr	May	Jun	Jul	Aug	Sep	Oct	Nov	Dec	Year
Mean daily maximum °C (°F)	29 (84)	30 (86)	32 (90)	35 (95)	35 (95)	35 (95)	34 (93)	33 (91)	32 (90)	31 (88)	30 (86)	28 (82)	32 (90)
Mean daily minimum °C (°F)	19 (66)	20 (68)	21 (70)	23 (73)	23 (73)	24 (75)	23 (73)	23 (73)	23 (73)	22 (72)	21 (70)	20 (68)	22 (71)
Average precipitation mm (inches)	31.2 (1.23)	23 (0.9)	27.7 (1.09)	28.1 (1.11)	113.5 (4.47)	141.4 (5.57)	176.4 (6.94)	236.6 (9.31)	224.9 (8.85)	247.7 (9.75)	222.9 (8.78)	178 (7.0)	1,651.4 (65)
Average rainy days	10	6	5	5	13	12	15	15	15	17	16	15	144
Source: World Weather Online

== Demographics ==
Population census of Gamu

Year	Pop.	±% p.a.
1903	3,581	—
1918	6,096	+3.61%
1939	18,201	+5.35%
1948	11,744	−4.75%
1960	18,762	+3.98%
1970	12,586	−3.91%
1975	13,635	+1.62%
1980	16,922	+4.41%

Year	Pop.	±% p.a.
1990	19,141	+1.24%
1995	22,765	+3.30%
2000	25,901	+2.81%
2007	27,479	+0.82%
2010	28,657	+1.54%
2015	29,904	+0.81%
2020	30,655	+0.52%
2024	30,850	+0.15%

Source: Philippine Statistics Authority

In the 2024 census, the population of Gamu was 30,850 people, with a density of 240 inhabitants per square kilometre or 620 inhabitants per square mile.

== Economy ==
Poverty incidence of Gamu (%)

Source: Philippine Statistics Authority

== Military ==
Camp Melchor F. dela Cruz, the headquarters of the 5th Infantry Division of the Philippine Army, is located in Barangay Upi. It was one of four strategic military bases in the Philippines that were opened to the US military in 2023 as part of the Enhanced Defense Cooperation Agreement.

== Culture ==
The town celebrated the Kuliglig before now Naraniag Festival on August 23, 2013, following an executive order issued by the municipal government to officially proclaim it as the official festivity of the town.

== Tourism ==
Gamu is noted for having the most number of Roman Catholic churches in the entire province of Isabela. These churches are often visited by pilgrims and frequented by travelers all over the country to pay homage to each of the respective Roman Catholic icons to whom each of the churches were dedicated and named after.

- The National Shrine of Our Lady of the Visitation of Guibang was elevated into a National Shrine in 1986 by the Catholic Bishops Conference of the Philippines (CBCP) through the initiative of Miguel Purugganan, then Bishop of the Diocese of Ilagan. It is where the Marian image of the Our Lady of the Visitation of Guibang is enshrined.
- The Cathedral of Saint Michael the Archangel is located along the National Highway in Barangay Upi. It is where the episcopal seat of the Roman Catholic Diocese of Ilagan is located since 2013, when it was transferred from Saint Ferdinand Cathedral in neighboring Ilagan.
- The Poor Clare Monastery in Barangay Guibang is a church and monastery that was built and dedicated to Saint Clare of Assisi. It was established in 1991 by Poor Clare nuns from Cabuyao, Laguna through the assistance of the Roman Catholic Diocese of Ilagan and help from civic-minded benefactors.
- The Saint Rose of Lima Church is a Baroque-style 18th century structure dedicated to the town's patron saint, Saint Rose of Lima. It is notably the oldest church in the town and one of the only remaining churches of its kind in the province of Isabela. On June 27, 2019, the National Museum of the Philippines and the National Commission for Culture and the Arts (NCCA) recognized the Saint Rose of Lima Church and its surrounding complex as an Important Cultural Property of the Philippines. The unveiling of the historical marker was done on May 12, 2023.

== Government ==
=== Local government ===
As a municipality in the Province of Isabela, government officials at the provincial and municipal levels are voted by the town. The provincial government has political jurisdiction over most local transactions of the municipal government.

The Municipality of Gamu is governed by a mayor, designated as its local chief executive, and by a municipal council as its legislative body in accordance with the Local Government Code. The mayor, vice mayor, and the municipal councilors are elected directly by the people through an election held every three years.

Barangays are also headed by elected officials: Barangay Captain, Barangay Council, whose members are called Barangay Councilors. The barangays have SK federation which represents the barangay, headed by SK chairperson and whose members are called SK councilors. All officials are also elected every three years.

=== Elected officials ===
Members of the Gamu Municipal Council (2025-2028)
Position	Name
District Representative	Ed Christopher S. Go
Municipal Mayor	Atty. Xian-Al D. Galanza
Municipal Vice-Mayor	Bob Burkley
Municipal Councilors	Timoteo Galanza
Municipal Councilors	Nestor Lacerna
Municipal Councilors	Reynante Agustin
Municipal Councilors	Cel Burkley
Municipal Councilors	Tim Uy
Municipal Councilors	Bong Caro
Municipal Councilors	JR Villareal
Municipal Councilors	Norberto Labayog

=== Congress representation ===
Gamu, belonging to the second legislative district of the province of Isabela, currently represented by Hon. Ed Christopher S. Go.

== Education ==
The Schools Division of Isabela governs the town's public education system. The division office is a field office of the DepEd in Cagayan Valley region. Gamu Schools District Office governs both the public and private elementary and high schools throughout the municipality.

=== Primary and elementary schools ===
- Barcolan Elementary School
- Buenavista Elementary School
- Camp Melchor F.D.C. Elementary School
- Dammao Elementary School
- Furao Elementary School
- Gamu Central School
- Gamu Galilee Nursery-Kindergarten School
- Gamu Rural School-Annex
- Gamu Rural School-Main
- Guibang Elementary School
- Lenzon Elementary School
- Linglingay Elementary School
- Mabini Adventist Multigrade School
- Mabini Christian Nurture Center
- Mabini Elementary School
- Pintor Elementary School
- Rizal Primary School
- Songsong Elementary School
- Sta. Rosa Primary School
- Union Elementary School
- Upi Elementary School

=== Secondary schools ===
Although the Isabela SPED Center Extension (School for the Deaf), and Isabela Sports Senior High School are both located in the capital Ilagan, these are being managed by Gamu District Office.

- Gamu Agri-Fishery School (formerly Gamu Rural School - Main)
- Gamu Rural School Annex - Junction Upi Annex
- Isabela SPED Center Extension (School for the Deaf)
- Isabela Sports Senior High School
- La Dolce Vita at Bethel Christian School
- Mabini National High School
