= Frances Tydingco-Gatewood =

American judge (born 1958)

Frances Gatewood
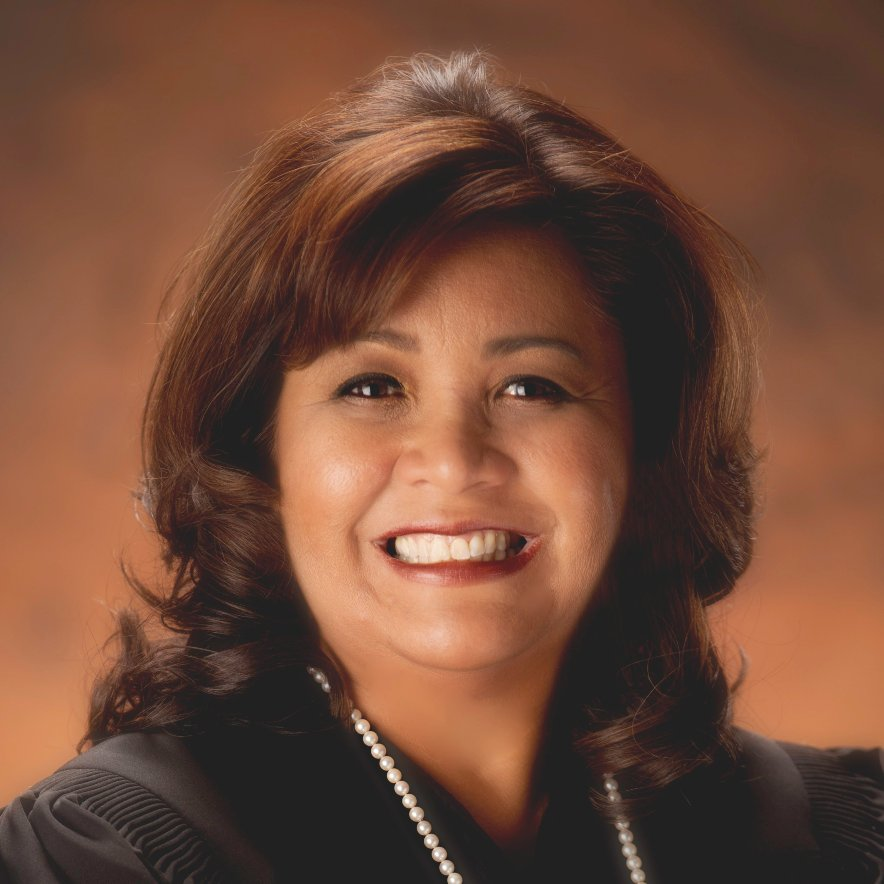

Chief Judge of the District Court of Guam
- Incumbent
- Assumed office October 30, 2006
- Appointed by: George W. Bush
- Preceded by: John S. Unpingco

Justice of the Guam Supreme Court
- In office February 8, 2002 – October 29, 2006
- Appointed by: Carl Gutierrez
- Preceded by: Benjamin Cruz
- Succeeded by: Katherine Maraman

Personal details
- Born: Frances Marie Tydingco-Gatewood; January 21, 1958 (age 68) Honolulu, Hawaii Territory, U.S.
- Education: Marquette University (BA); University of Missouri, Kansas City (JD)

Frances Marie Tydingco-Gatewood (born January 21, 1958) is an American attorney and jurist. She has served as chief judge of the federal District Court of Guam since 2006, having been nominated by President George W. Bush. Prior to this, she served as an associate justice on the Supreme Court of Guam and as trial judge on the Superior Court of Guam.

== Early life and education ==
Tydingco-Gatewood was born on January 21, 1958, in Honolulu, Hawaii. She attended George Washington High School, in Mangilao, Guam and obtained her Bachelor of Arts in political science at Marquette University in 1980. She received her Juris Doctor from the University of Missouri–Kansas City School of Law in 1983.

== Legal career ==
She began her legal career as a law clerk for Forest W. Hanna on the circuit court of Jackson County, Missouri, from 1983 to 1984. In 1984, she became the first female Chamoru assistant Attorney General of Guam. She served as assistant attorney general in that office until 1988. She then worked with the Jackson County Prosecutor's Office in Missouri as an assistant prosecutor from 1988 to 1990. While in the Missouri office, She was assigned to the Drug Team and Homicide Unit and served as the Trial Team Leader for the Sex Crimes Unit. Subsequently, she served as chief prosecutor for the District of Guam from 1990 to 1994 at the Office of the Attorney General.

== Judicial career ==
=== Superior Court of Guam ===
In 1994, she was appointed by Governor Joseph F. Ada as a trial judge of the Superior Court of Guam.

=== Supreme Court of Guam ===
On September 1, 2001, she was appointed by Governor Carl Gutierrez as an associate justice of the Supreme Court of Guam. She was sworn in on February 8, 2002 and served in that position until October 29, 2006.

=== United States district and bankruptcy courts of Guam ===
Tydingco-Gatewood was nominated as a United States district judge of the District Court of Guam by President George W. Bush on April 25, 2006. She was confirmed by the United States Senate on August 3, 2006. Chief Judge Tydingco-Gatewood is only one of two judges in the entire federal judiciary who sits as both a district and bankruptcy judge.

She was renominated on May 18, 2016, by President Barack Obama to another ten-year term on the court. On January 3, 2017, her nomination was returned to the president at the sine die adjournment of the 114th Congress. She is currently sitting as a "holdover" judge and awaiting potential reappointment. On November 8, 2024, President Joe Biden announced his intention to nominate her for a new 10-year term. Her nomination was not sent to the Senate before Biden left office.

Legal offices
Preceded by Benjamin Cruz	Justice of the Guam Supreme Court; 2002–2006	Succeeded by Katherine Maraman
Preceded by John S. Unpingco	Judge of the District Court of Guam; 2006–present	Incumbent
