= Supreme Court of Guam =

Highest judicial body of the United States territory of Guam

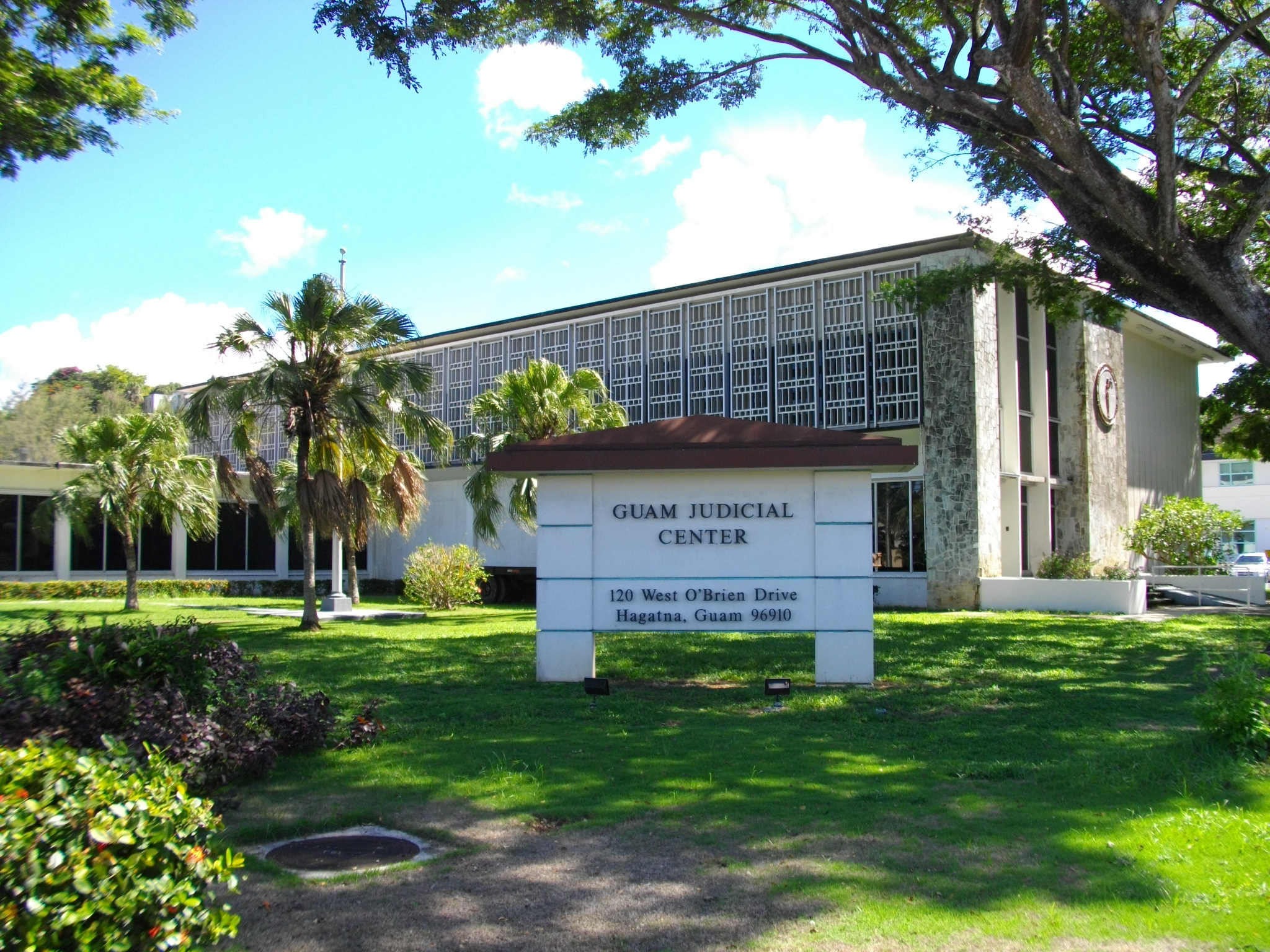
- The Guam Judicial Center, with the Supreme Court on the third floor
- Established: 1996 (30 years ago)
- Jurisdiction: Guam
- Location: Hagåtña, Guam
- Authorised by: Organic Act of Guam
- Appeals to: Supreme Court of the United States
- Number of positions: 3
- Website: Supreme Court of Guam

Chief Justice
- Currently: Katherine Maraman
- Since: January 20, 2026

The Supreme Court of Guam is the highest judicial body of the United States territory of Guam. The Court hears all appeals from the Superior Court of Guam and exercises original jurisdiction only in cases where a certified question is submitted to it by a U.S. federal court, the Governor of Guam, or the Guam Legislature. The Supreme Court of Guam is the ultimate judicial authority on local matters. In the past, appeals of questions involving the U.S. Constitution or federal laws or treaties were heard by a three-judge appellate panel of the U.S. District Court of Guam, from which appeals could be further taken to the United States Court of Appeals for the Ninth Circuit, but this is no longer the case. Since 2006, the court's decisions have only been appealable to the Supreme Court of the United States, in line with the practice regarding the highest courts of the 50 states. The Court sits in the Monessa G. Lujan Memorial Courtroom, which is on the third floor of the Guam Judicial Center in Hagåtña, Guam.

== Structure ==
The Court is composed of three justices who are appointed by the Governor of Guam and confirmed by the Guam Legislature. Justices serve for terms of good behavior, subject to a retention election every ten years after his/her appointment. The three justices issue judgment on all cases brought before them. They all sit on the Judicial Council of Guam, which is ultimately in charge of the administration of the Guam Judiciary.

=== Current justices ===
The justice's full biographies can be found at the Supreme Court's website. The current justices of the Supreme Court of Guam are:

Name	Start	Chief term	Term ends	Appointer	Law school
Robert Torres, Chief Justice	January 16, 2004	2008–2011; 2015–2017; 2023–2026	2034	Carl Gutierrez (D)	Harvard
Philip Carbullido	October 27, 2000	2003–2008; 2011–2014; 2020–2023	2030	Carl Gutierrez (D)	UC Davis
Katherine Maraman	February 21, 2008	2017–2020; 2026–present	2028	Felix P. Camacho (R)	UNM

== List of chief justices ==
Name	Term start	Chief Start	Chief End	Appointer
Peter Siguenza	April 21, 1996	April 21, 1996	April 21, 1999	Carl Gutierrez (D)
Peter Siguenza	April 21, 1996	September 1, 2001	January 23, 2003	Carl Gutierrez (D)
Benjamin Cruz	October 13, 1997	April 21, 1999	August 31, 2001	Carl Gutierrez (D)
Philip Carbullido	October 27, 2000	January 23, 2003	January 15, 2008	Carl Gutierrez (D)
Philip Carbullido	October 27, 2000	January 18, 2011	January 21, 2014	Carl Gutierrez (D)
Philip Carbullido	October 27, 2000	January 21, 2020	January 17, 2023	Carl Gutierrez (D)
Robert Torres	January 16, 2004	January 15, 2008	January 18, 2011	Felix P. Camacho (R)
Robert Torres	January 16, 2004	January 21, 2014	January 17, 2017	Felix P. Camacho (R)
Robert Torres	January 16, 2004	January 17, 2023	January 20, 2026	Felix P. Camacho (R)
Katherine Maraman	February 21, 2008	January 17, 2017	January 21, 2020	Felix P. Camacho (R)
Katherine Maraman	February 21, 2008	January 20, 2026	present	Felix P. Camacho (R)

== Retired justices ==
Name	Start	End	Prior Roles	Appointer
Peter Siguenza	April 21, 1996	August 31, 2001	Chief Justice of Guam (1996–1999, 2001–2003); Associate Justice of the Supreme Court of Guam (1999–2001); Judge of the Superior Court of Guam (1984–1996)	Carl Gutierrez (D)
Janet Healy Weeks	April 21, 1996	April 30, 1999	Associate Justice of the Supreme Court of Guam (1996–1999); Judge of the Superior Court of Guam (1975–1996)	Carl Gutierrez (D)
Monessa Lujan	April 21, 1996	March 15, 1997	Associate Justice (1996–1997)	Carl Gutierrez (D)
Benjamin Cruz	October 13, 1997	August 31, 2001	Chief Justice of Guam (1999–2001); Associate Justice of the Supreme Court of Guam (1997–1999); Judge of the Superior Court of Guam (1984–1997)	Carl Gutierrez (D)
Frances Tydingco-Gatewood	February 8, 2002	October 29, 2006	Associate Justice of the Supreme Court of Guam (2002–2006); Judge of the Superior Court of Guam (1994–2001)	Carl Gutierrez (D)

== The Superior Court of Guam ==
Judges of the Superior Court are appointed by the governor with the advice and consent of the Legislature for a term of eight years. If they wish to continue in office, their names are placed on the ballot at a general election. They must garner at least 50 percent plus one favorable vote of the number of cast ballots to remain in office. Judge Richard Benson and Judge Joaquin E. Manibusan were the first to be placed on a ballot. They both received the overwhelming approval of the voters.

The Superior Court is a court of general jurisdiction, and its seven judges preside over criminal, civil, juvenile, probate, small claims, traffic and child support cases brought before them. The hearing officer generally does not preside over all of these subjects, but is utilized predominantly in small claims, family, and traffic matters. In December 2005, the Adult and Juvenile Drug Courts were recognized as courts of record of the Judiciary of Guam. These programs are examples of "therapeutic justice" which focuses on rehabilitation of offenders and their reintegration into society. Judges are assigned to cases on a rotating basis, though one is rotated into assignment as designated Drug Court judge exclusively for a specified period (currently yearly). The Presiding Judge's additional responsibility is primarily procedural and administrative concerns, though formerly the "PJ," as the position is commonly referred to, assigned cases to the various judges.

The current Judges of the Superior Court of Guam are:

- The Hon. Alberto C. Lamorena III (Presiding Judge)
- The Hon. Elyze M. Iriarte
- The Hon. Maria Teresa B. Cenzon
- The Hon. Michael J. Bordallo
- The Hon. Vernon P. Perez
- The Hon. Arthur R. Barcinas
- The Hon. Dana A. Gutierrez
- The Hon. Alberto Tolentino

Former Judges include:

- The Hon. Paul J. Abbate Jr. (Presiding Judge)
- The Hon. Elizabeth Barrett-Anderson
- The Hon. Richard Benson
- The Hon. James L. Canto II
- The Hon. Benjamin J. Cruz. (Elevated to Guam Supreme Court)
- The Hon. Judge Ramon V. Diaz
- The Hon. Janet Healy-Weeks (Elevated to Guam Supreme Court)
- The Hon. Joaquin V.E. Manibusan
- The Hon. Joaquin V.E. Manibusan Jr. (Appointed U.S. Magistrate Judge for District Court of Guam)
- The Hon. Joaquin C. Perez (Guam's first Presiding Judge)
- The Hon. John Raker
- The Hon. Vicente C. Reyes (Guam's first island attorney)
- The Hon. Peter C. Siguenza Jr. (Elevated to Guam Supreme Court)
- The Hon. Anita A. Sukola
- The Hon. Frances Tydingco-Gatewood (Elevated to Guam Supreme Court. Appointed Chief Judge for District Court of Guam)
- The Hon. Steven S. Unpingco

== See also ==
- District Court of Guam
- Politics of Guam
