= District Court of Guam =

United States territorial court

District Court of Guam Fanhusgayan Destriton Guåhån (Chamorro)
- (D. Guam)
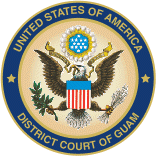
- Location: United States Courthouse (Hagåtña, Guam)
- Appeals to: Ninth Circuit
- Established: 1950
- Authority: Article IV tribunal
- Created by: Guam Organic Act of 1950; 48 U.S.C. §§ 1424–1424c
- Composition method: Presidential nomination with Senate advice and consent
- Judges: 1
- Judge term length: 10 years (and until successor is chosen and qualified)
- Chief Judge: Frances Tydingco-Gatewood

Officers of the court
- U.S. Attorney: Shawn N. Anderson
- U.S. Marshal: Fernando L. G. Sablan
- www.gud.uscourts.gov

The District Court of Guam (in case citations, D. Guam) is a United States territorial court with jurisdiction over the United States territory of Guam. It sits in the capital, Hagåtña. Appeals of the court's decisions are taken to the United States Court of Appeals for the Ninth Circuit. It is not an Article III court, and therefore its judges do not have life tenure, but are appointed to ten-year terms.

== History ==
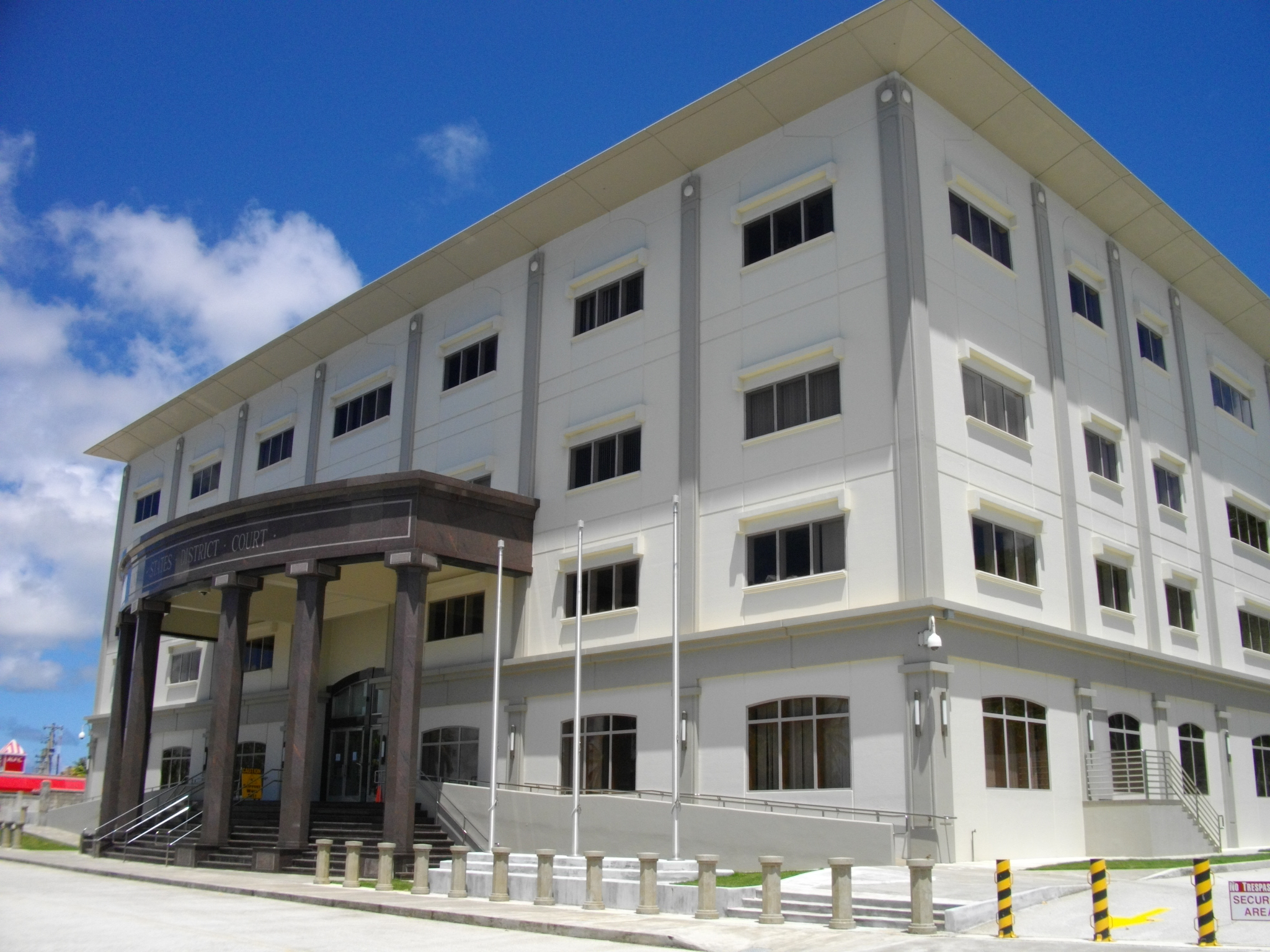
Courthouse in Hagåtña

The District Court of Guam was established in 1950 by the Guam Organic Act to have the same jurisdiction as a United States district court. Under Section 22(a) of the Guam Organic Act, the Court was granted:

- in all causes arising under the laws of the United States, the jurisdiction of a district court of the United States as such court is defined in section 451 of title 28, United States Code;
- original jurisdiction in all other causes in Guam, jurisdiction over which has not been transferred by the legislature to other court or courts established by it, and;
- such appellate jurisdiction as the legislature may determine.

In 1951, the Guam Legislature created Commissioners' Courts, the Police Court, and the Island Court, decisions from which were appealable to the District Court. In 1974, the Legislature consolidated these courts into the Guam Superior Court. The legislature also created a Guam Supreme Court to hear appeals from the Superior Court. However, the Ninth Circuit found in 1976 that the appellate jurisdiction of the District Court could not be transferred without authorization by Congress, and the Supreme Court of the United States upheld this ruling in a 5–4 decision in 1977. Justice Thurgood Marshall wrote the dissenting opinion, in which he argued that Congress had plainly authorized the enactment of the challenged legislation. Further legislation divested the District Court's appellate jurisdiction over local matters in 1994.

The District Court was housed in the Guam Congress Building from 1950 to 1968, in the Courthouse of Guam from 1968 to 1978, in the Pacific News Building from 1978 to 2000, and since then in the United States Courthouse Building.

== Current judge ==
As of August 8, 2006:

#	Title	Judge	Duty station	Born	Term of service			Appointed by
#	Title	Judge	Duty station	Born	Active	Chief	Senior	Appointed by
6	Chief Judge	Frances Tydingco-Gatewood	Hagåtña	1958	2006–present	2006–present	—	G.W. Bush

== Vacancy and pending nomination ==
Seat	Prior judge's duty station	Seat last held by	Vacancy reason	Date of vacancy	Nominee	Date of nomination
1	Hagåtña	Frances Tydingco-Gatewood	Term expired	October 30, 2016	–	–

== Former judges ==
#	Judge	Born–died	Active service	Chief Judge	Senior status	Appointed by	Reason for termination
1	Paul D. Shriver	—	1951–1959	1951–1959	—	Truman	
2	Eugene R. Gilmartin	—	1959–1961	1959–1961	—	Eisenhower	
3	Paul D. Shriver	—	1961–1969	1961–1969	—	Kennedy	
4	Cristobal C. Duenas	—	1969–1991	1969–1991	—	Nixon	Resignation
5	John S. Unpingco	1950–2023	1992–2004	1992–2004	—	G.H.W. Bush	Expiration of term

== See also ==
- List of courts of the United States
- List of current United States district judges
- List of United States federal courthouses in Guam
- Politics of Guam
- Supreme Court of Guam
- United States Attorney for the Districts of Guam and the Northern Mariana Islands
- District Court for the Northern Mariana Islands
