= United States Navy operations during World War I =

- Part of the naval warfare of World War I
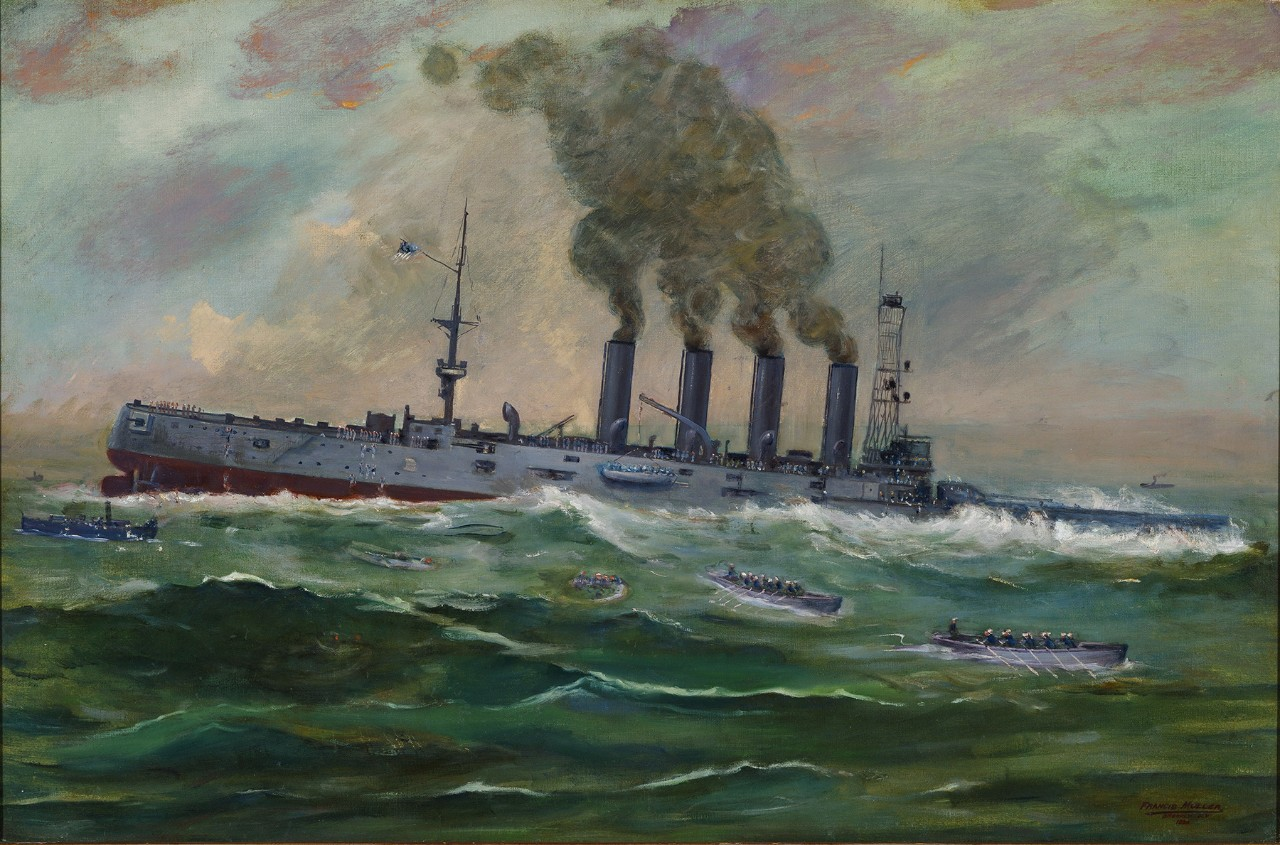
- The Sinking of USS San Diego; Francis Muller, 1920
Date	1917–1919
Location	Atlantic Ocean, Mediterranean Sea, Pacific Ocean
Result	American victory

Belligerents
United States	Germany; Austria-Hungary

Commanders and leaders
William Sims; Austin Knight; Hugh Rodman	Reinhard Scheer; Franz von Hipper; Maximilian Njegovan

United States Navy operations during World War I began on April 6, 1917, after the formal declaration of war on the German Empire. The United States Navy focused on countering enemy U-boats in the Atlantic Ocean and the Mediterranean Sea while convoying men and supplies to France and Italy. Because of United States's late entry into the war, her capital ships never engaged the German fleet and few decisive submarine actions occurred.

== Operations ==
=== Atlantic Ocean ===
The main theater of World War I was the Western Front. In order to relieve the British and European allies already on the battle front, the United States Navy was tasked with transporting millions of U.S. soldiers and supplies across the Atlantic to France. The United States Navy was ill prepared for war, and the only solution was to begin deploying whatever was available on convoy duty and arming merchantmen with small naval guns manned by armed guard detachments.

Congress declared war on April 6, 1917, which meant the United States Coast Guard automatically became a part of the Department of the Navy. (Note: Under the January 28, 1915 act creating the Coast Guard from the merger of the United States Revenue Cutter Service and the United States Life-Saving Service the Coast Guard comes under orders of the Secretary of the Navy when Congress declares war or when the President directs such an action to be taken. (U.S. Congress, "Act to Create the Coast Guard", Congressional Record, 63rd Congress, 3rd session, 1915, volume 2, part 2.)) Destroyers and similar escort warships were considered the most effective means of sinking enemy submarines and protecting merchantmen. Therefore, destroyer squadrons were based in the British Isles at major ports, including Queenston, Ireland. The capital ships took up positions with the British Royal Navy in the North Sea for an uneventful blockade of the German High Seas Fleet that would last even after the armistice into 1919.

The first victory for the United States Navy took place in the Atlantic on October 15, 1917. The destroyer USS Cassin, commanded by Lieutenant Commander W. N. Vernon, encountered U-61 off Mine Head, Ireland. After chasing the U-boat for an hour, U-61 turned around and fired a single torpedo, which struck Cassin to port. Gunner's Mate First Class Osmond Ingram noticed the torpedo just before it struck and alarmed the K-gun crew, who began firing depth charges. Cassin was heavily damaged, but her crew kept her afloat and continued firing. Ingram was killed and later was to receive the Medal of Honor, while nine others were wounded. Cassin struck U-61's conning tower, which forced her crew to disengage and retreat.

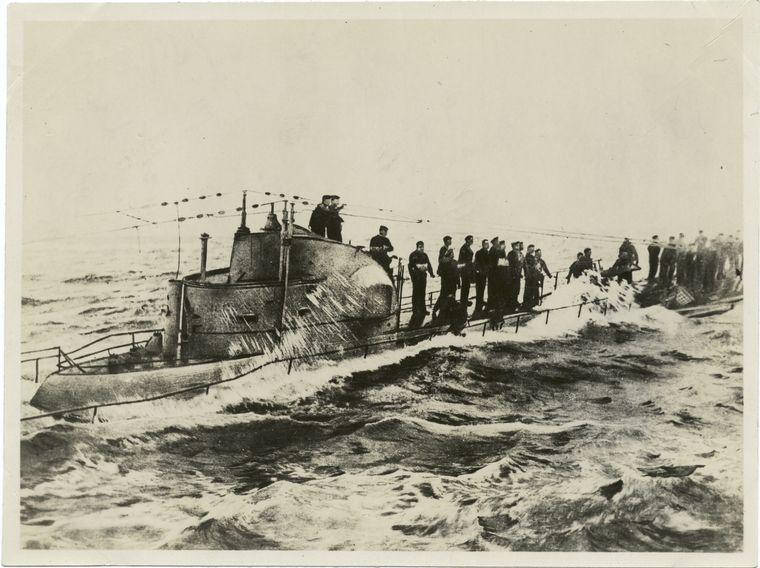
German officers and crewmen evacuating the U-58 on November 17, 1917.

On November 17, 1917, two destroyers became the first U.S. Navy ships to sink an enemy submarine. USS Fanning and USS Nicholson were escorting convoy OQ-20 eastbound, when a lookout sighted the periscope of U-58. The U-boat was forced to surface by depth charges and then defeated in a brief surface engagement. At least one shot from Nicholson struck the U-boat, killing two men and causing heavy damage. The thirty-nine survivors abandoned the sinking U-58 and were taken prisoner. Lieutenants Frank Berrien and Arthur S. Carpender both received the Navy Cross.

Four United States Navy ships were lost during World War I, only two by enemy action, though six merchant ships with armed guards aboard were also destroyed. The first combat loss was USS Jacob Jones, a destroyer, which was sailing to Ireland in a zig-zag pattern with five other warships from Brest. On December 17, Kapitänleutnant Hans Rose of U-53 sighted the destroyer and attacked with a spread of torpedoes. One was sighted by the Americans, but despite taking evasive action, she was fatally damaged. Commander David W. Bagley ordered his crew to abandon ship, and as she sank the armed depth charges aboard began to detonate, adding to the already heavy casualties. Sixty-six of her crew were killed, and more injured; only thirty-eight survived. Jacob Jones was the first U.S. destroyer ever lost in battle, and she went down within eight minutes.

The largest loss of life for the U.S. Navy during the war was on the collier USS Cyclops in March 1918. She left Barbados on March 4, 1918 bound for Baltimore, Maryland, but was never seen again. She may have been sunk by a German U-boat, but it is more likely that she capsized because of the shifting of her cargo of coal. Cyclops was lost with 236 crew and passengers.

Three United States Army and navy transports, USAT Henry R. Mallory, USAT Tenadores and USS Mercury, received credit for defeating a U-boat on April 4, 1918. Sailing back to the United States from France, a U-boat surfaced at 11:45 and fired her torpedoes at the Mallory. Lookouts spotted the tracks, and the ship was able to evade the torpedo. The submarine was then spotted, and all three ships opened fire with their main guns, hitting the U-boat as it submerged. The Americans began dropping depth charges, but the unknown U-boat was not seen again.

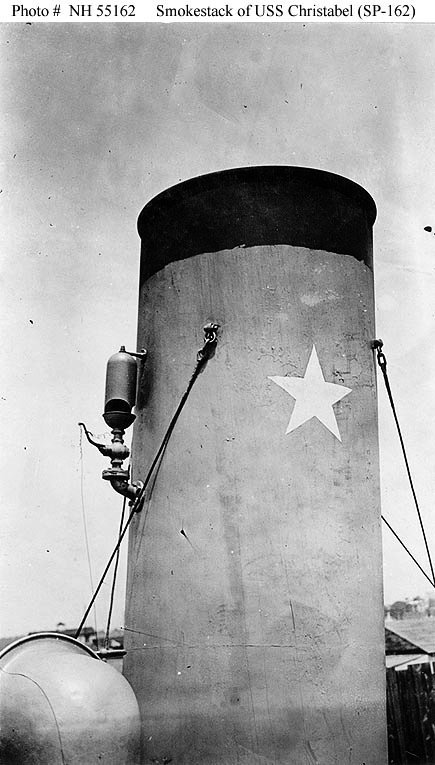
USS Christabel's white star, the symbol for a U-boat kill.

The auxiliary yacht USS Christabel twice engaged the UC-56 on May 21 off the coast of Spain while escorting a British merchantman. That afternoon, an oil slick was spotted by Christabel's crew, and later, the wake of the submarine was spotted. Depth charges were dropped, but the submarine escaped and returned to harass the convoy that night. At about 11:00 p.m., lookouts on Cristabel sighted a periscope and immediately maneuvered to fire depth charges. Several successive hits damaged the U-boat, but it escaped and had to cruise on the surface to Santander to prevent its sinking. The crew of UC-56 were interned by Spain, but the U-boat was scuttled rather than be handed over. During the action, a few depth charges became loose aboard Christabel, and at great personal risk Ensign Daniel Augustus Joseph Sullivan secured them, earning him the Medal of Honor.

On June 6 U-151 attacked the British ocean liner SS Dwinsk about 400 miles east of the Bermudas. Twenty-two crewmen were lost, but the rest survived in the lifeboats. The U-boat remained in the area to use the lifeboats as bait for Allied ships. A few hours, later the auxiliary cruiser USS Von Steuben arrived and found the lifeboats. But before she reached them, a torpedo was spotted. Two guns opened fire, one on the incoming torpedo and the other on U-151's periscope. The cruiser also began evasive maneuvers and the torpedo missed her.

U-156, under Richard Feldt, raided the port of Orleans, Massachusetts, on the morning of July 18. Feldt surfaced in the dark and positioned his boat off Nauset Beach. He then began shelling the civilian tugboat Perth Amboy and four wooden barges with his deck gun. All five targets were destroyed. A few shells missed and struck shore, becoming the first enemy shells on the continental United States since the 1846 Siege of Fort Texas at the beginning of the Mexican War. Nine Coast Guard Curtiss HS seaplanes spotted the U-boat and dropped bombs on her, but all failed to detonate.

The following day, USS San Diego suffered an explosion while sailing from the Portsmouth Naval Yard to New York City. The armored cruiser was northeast of Fire Island when it was thought a torpedo struck her port side below the waterline at the engine room below. The damage prevented a water tight hatch from sealing and the engine room and fire room No. 9 both flooded in minutes. Captain Harley H. Christy was convinced he was under a U-boat attack and ordered his men to battle stations. They began firing at anything that even vaguely resembled a periscope. When it was clear the ship could not be saved, Captain Christy gave the order to abandon ship. Twenty-eight minutes after the explosion, San Diego slipped under the waves, taking six crewmen with her. There was later some controversy over the sinking, as no U-boat was reported in the area. Eventually, the sinking was blamed on a sea mine possibly laid by U-156. USS San Diego was the only U.S. Navy capital ship lost in the war.

The only lightvessel of the lost in combat was Diamond Shoal Lightship No. 71. On August 6, she was patrolling off North Carolina's Diamond Shoals when she encounter a sinking cargo ship, Merak, a victim of U-140.

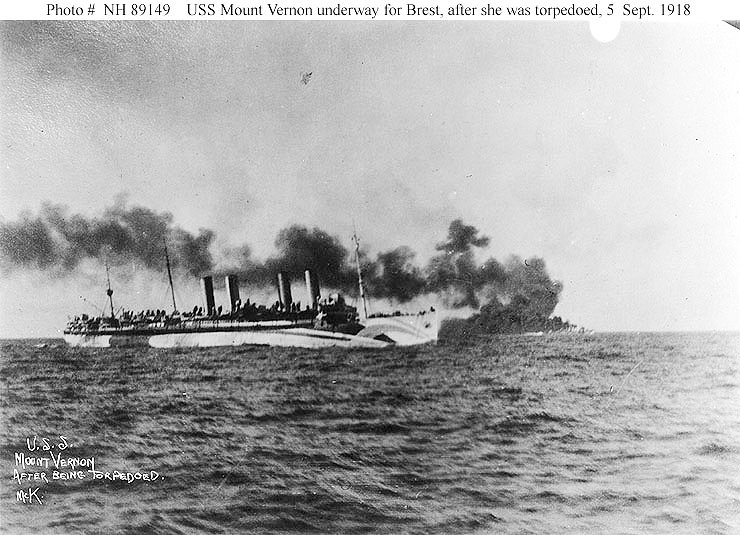
USS Mount Vernon on September 5 after being torpedoed.

The survivors were rescued, and LV-71's captain, Master Walter Barnett, sent out a warning to friendly that a U-boat was in the area."U-140" intercepted the message and returned. Upon arrival, she surfaced and Commander Waldemar Kophamel demanded the Americans abandon the lightship. As LV-71 was unarmed, her crew had no choice but to row ashore in their boat, while the U-boat destroyed ship with its deck gun. There were no casualties on either side.

USS Mount Vernon was a German ocean liner that was seized and armed by the United States Navy. On the morning of September 5, 1918, Mount Vernon was off the coast of France accompanied by four destroyers, when the periscope of U-82 was sighted. The auxiliary cruiser immediately opened fire with her main guns, damaging the submarine. However, U-82 managed to fire a torpedo. Mount Vernon tried to dodge the torpedo, but was unsuccessful. Thirty six sailors were killed and thirteen wounded, but the ship was saved. USS Winslow, Conner, Wainwright and Nicholson all dropped depth charges, but the U-boat got away.

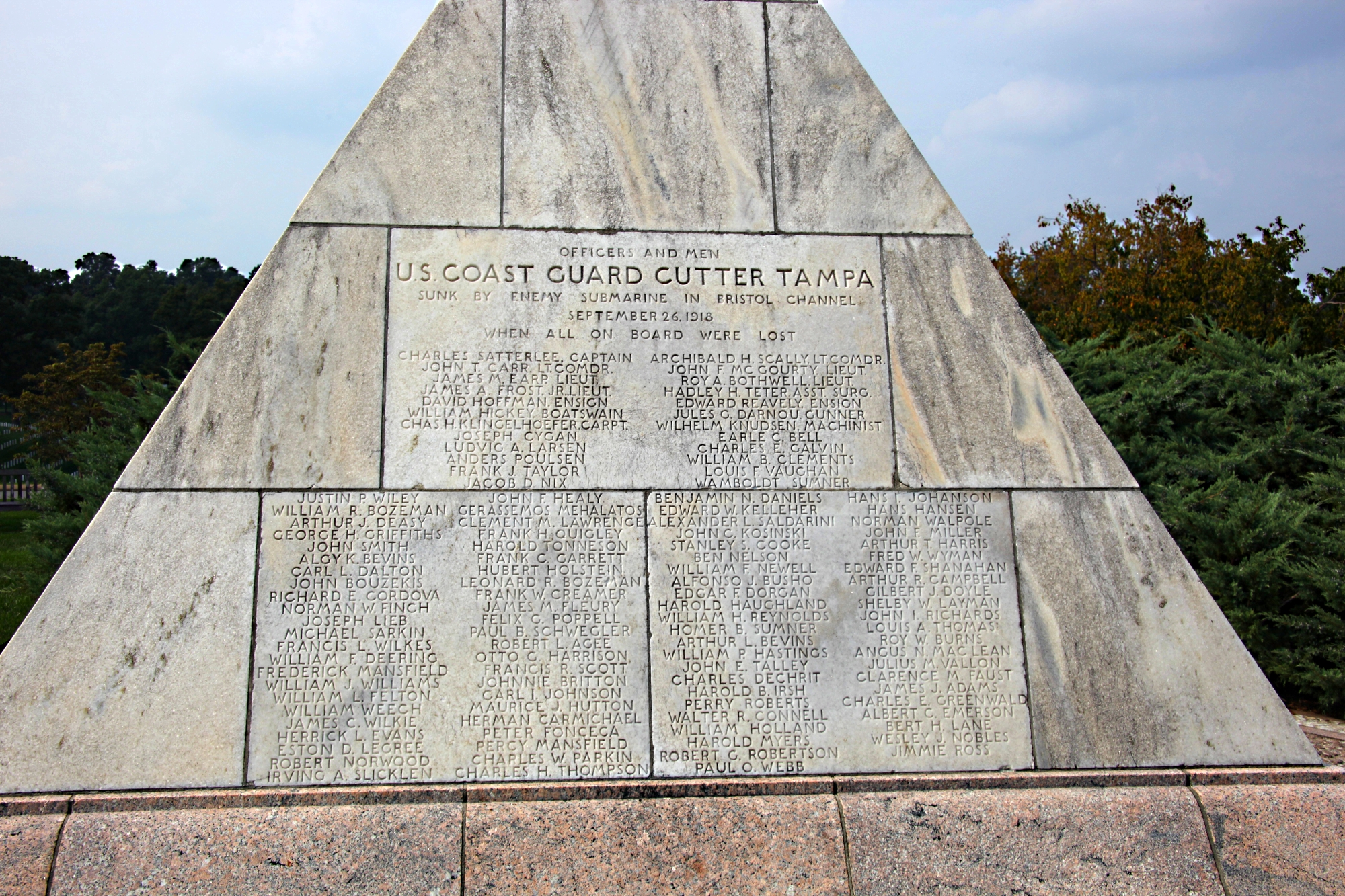
This United States Coast Guard Memorial to the crew and passengers of Tampa was dedicated at Arlington National Cemetery on 23 May 1928.

Operating as part of the U.S. Navy on 26 September 1918, USCGC Tampa parted company with convoy HG 107, which she had just escorted into the Irish Sea from Gibraltar. Ordered to put into Milford Haven, Wales, she proceeded independently toward her destination. At 1930 that evening, as she transited the Bristol Channel, the warship was spotted by UB-91. According to the submarine war diary entry, the U-boat dived and maneuvered into an attack position, firing one torpedo out of the stern tube at 2015 from a range of about 550 meters (600 yd). Minutes later, the torpedo hit Tampa and exploded portside amidships, throwing up a huge, luminous column of water. The cutter sank with all hands: 111 U.S Coast Guardsmen, 4 U.S. Navy sailors, and 16 passengers consisting of 11 British Navy personnel and 5 civilians. She sank in the Bristol Channel at roughly 50°40′N 6°19′W. Alerted by the convoy flagship, whose radio operator reported having felt the shock of an underwater explosion at about 2045, search and rescue efforts over the succeeding three days turned up only some wreckage, clearly identified as coming from Tampa, and a single unidentified body. Three bodies were later recovered, two from a beach near Lamphey, Wales, and the other at sea by a British patrol boat. Tampa was identified as the largest loss of life suffered by a combatant ship during World War I.

=== North Sea ===
To support the North Sea Mine Barrage, the United States manufactured 100,000 naval mines to prevent U-boats from reaching Atlantic shipping lanes. The Barrage was implemented with the encouragement of then-Assistant Secretary of the Navy Franklin D. Roosevelt. Rear Admiral Joseph Strauss commanded a United States North Sea Mine Force mission of 10 minelayers to lay the mines. Over the next five months the US Navy laid 56,571 mines of the total 70,177 planted during the Barrage.
Rear Admiral Lewis Clinton-Baker, commanding the Royal Navy minelaying force at the time, described the barrage as the "biggest mine planting stunt in the world's history." The official statistics on lost German submarines compiled on March 1, 1919 credited the North Sea mine barrage with the certain destruction of four U-boats, probable destruction of two more, and possible destruction of another two.

Four battleships of Battleship Division 9 (designated 6th Battle Squadron in the Grand Fleet) under Rear Admiral Hugh Rodman, namely New York, Delaware, Wyoming and Florida, arrived at Rosyth on December 7, 1917, to reinforce the British blockade of the German fleet. Texas joined in February 1918, and Arkansas replaced Delaware in July.

=== Mediterranean Sea ===
U.S. naval operations in the Mediterranean took the form of escorting convoys and delivering supplies. In the Mediterranean, Austro-Hungarian forces in northern Italy and the Ottoman Empire were two major threats, though by 1917 their navies were mostly defeated or blockaded by ships of the Otranto Barrage. Other than the land Battle of Vittorio Veneto, the Americans engaged in only two memorable battles in the Mediterranean theater.

The first was when USS Lydonia and HMS Basilisk sank a U-boat off Algiers on May 8, 1918. Lydonia and Basilisk were steaming with a convoy from Bizerte to Gibraltar when they came across the German submarine UB-70. A coordinated depth charge attack ensued but the Germans were able to torpedo the British merchant ship Ingleside, which sank. After a fifteen-minute running battle, the depth charging was stopped and survivors of Ingleside were rescued. Heavy seas prevented an immediate assessment of possible damage to the submarine but later evaluations credited USS Lydonia and HMS Basilisk with sinking UB-70 when she failed to show up at any port.

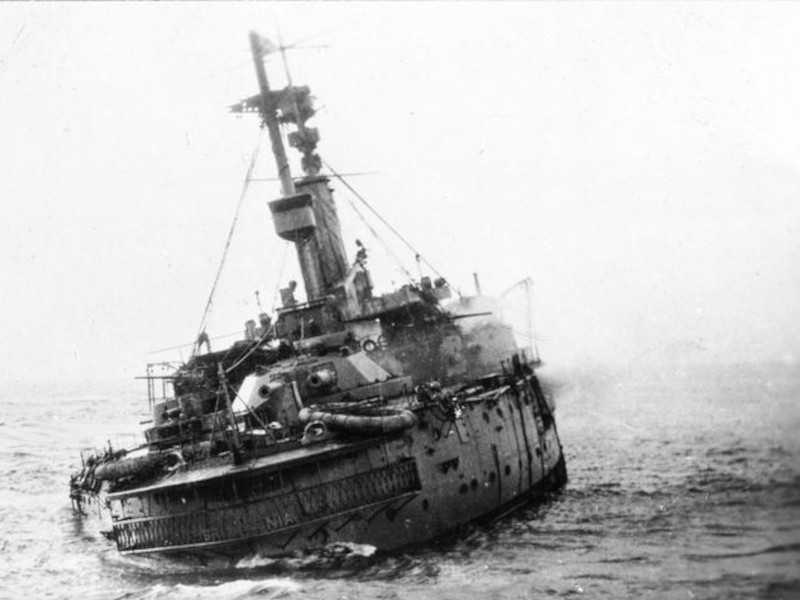
HMS Britannia sinking after being torpedoed by UB-50 on November 9, 1918.

Twelve U.S. submarine chasers under Captain Charles P. Nelson were part of an attack on the Austro-Hungarian held naval base at Durazzo, Albania. The battle began on October 11 with Italian and British aircraft bombarding Austro-Hungarian concentrations within the city while the allied fleet was still crossing the Adriatic Sea. When they arrived, the larger ships engaged shore batteries while the Americans plotted a path through a sea mine field and engaged two Austro-Hungarian submarines, U-29 and U-31. Two destroyers and a torpedo boat were also damaged by American and British ships with help from some Italian MAS boats and one merchant vessel was sunk. In the end no Americans were hurt in the battle and the naval base was left in ruins. For his leadership and courage at Durazzo, Captain Nelson received the Navy Distinguished Service Medal as well as other foreign decorations.

Coast Guard Captain Leroy Reinburg of USS Druid engaged enemy submarines near the Strait of Gibraltar in November 1918. The Druid was operating as part of the Gibraltar Barrage, a squadron of U.S. and British ships assigned to keeping enemy U-boats from passing from the Mediterranean into the Atlantic. On November 8, 1918, men aboard USS Druid sighted three surfaced submarines going through the strait. The weather was foul and the seas rough but the barrage squadron attacked anyway, first with gunfire and then with depth charges. HMS Privet reported that she shot a hole through one of the submarines' conning towers with a 4-inch (100 mm) gun but other than that no other damage was thought to have occurred. USS Druid and her compatriots were successful in defending the strait and on the following day the Americans helped rescue the British crew of the battleship HMS Britannia which had been torpedoed by UB-50 while passing through Gibraltar into the Mediterranean. The war ended three days later on November 11.

=== Pacific Ocean ===
U.S. naval forces in the Pacific Theater of World War I were far removed from the conflict with Germany and the other Central Powers. Although Imperial Germany possessed Pacific colonies at the beginning of the war, all of the isolated colonies had easily been conquered by the Allies by 1915. The only significant United States naval presence in the Pacific was a cruiser squadron under Admiral Austin M. Knight.

There was only one engagement in the theater involving the United States, and it took place just one day after the United States declared war. In December 1914 the German auxiliary cruiser SMS Cormoran was commerce raiding in the South Pacific, when her commander put in for provisions on the then neutral island of Guam, a United States territory. Captain Adalbert Zuckschwerdt needed coal, but there was little to be had. As a result, the ship was stranded and her crew were interned for the next three years. When the war with Germany finally began on April 6, 1917, the old schooner USS Supply was ordered to demand the Cormoran surrender or be sunk. Captain Zuckschwerdt refused to hand over his ship, knowing it would be used against his country. Instead, he ordered his men to scuttle her. In an attempt to prevent this, the captain of the USS Supply ordered the United States Marines on board to open fire on German crew. Nine German sailors would be killed, either by the rifle fire or the explosion that sank the Cormoran.

== Gallery ==
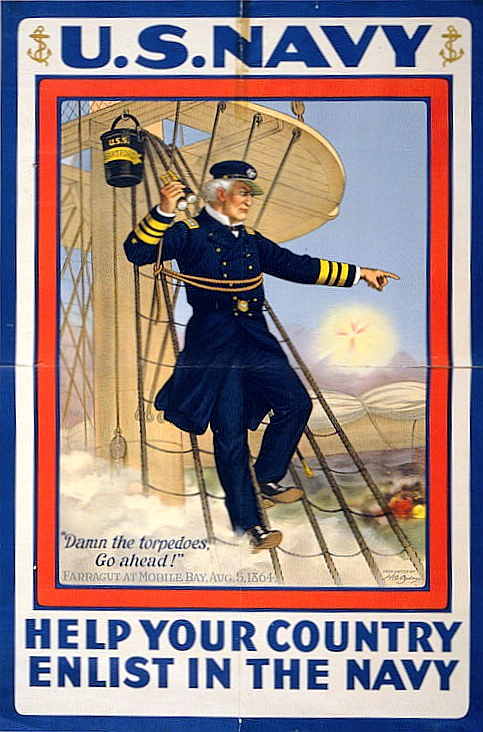
"Damn the torpedoes, go ahead!" Admiral David Farragut at Mobile Bay, August 5, 1864.

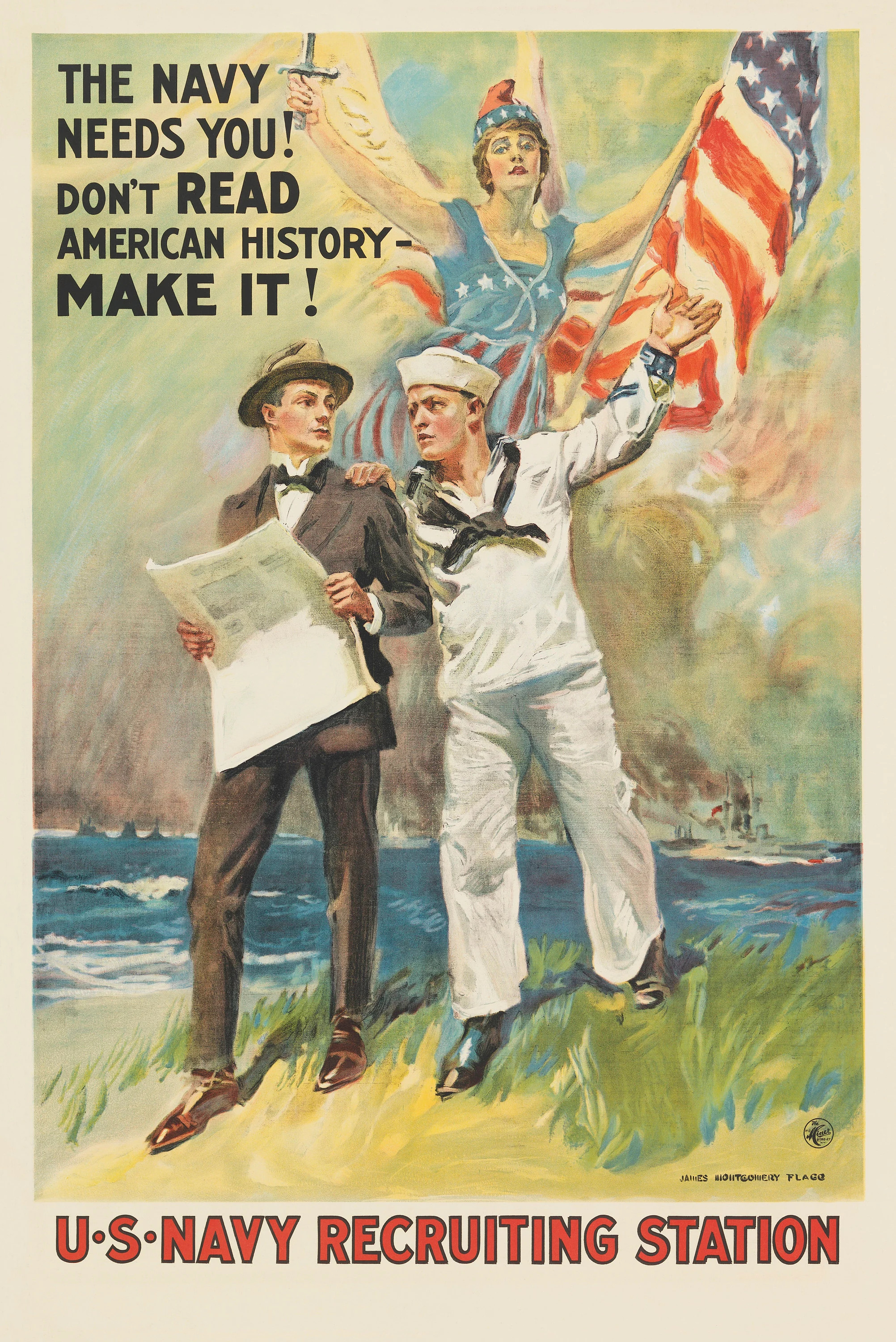
"The Navy Needs You! Don't READ American History, MAKE IT!"

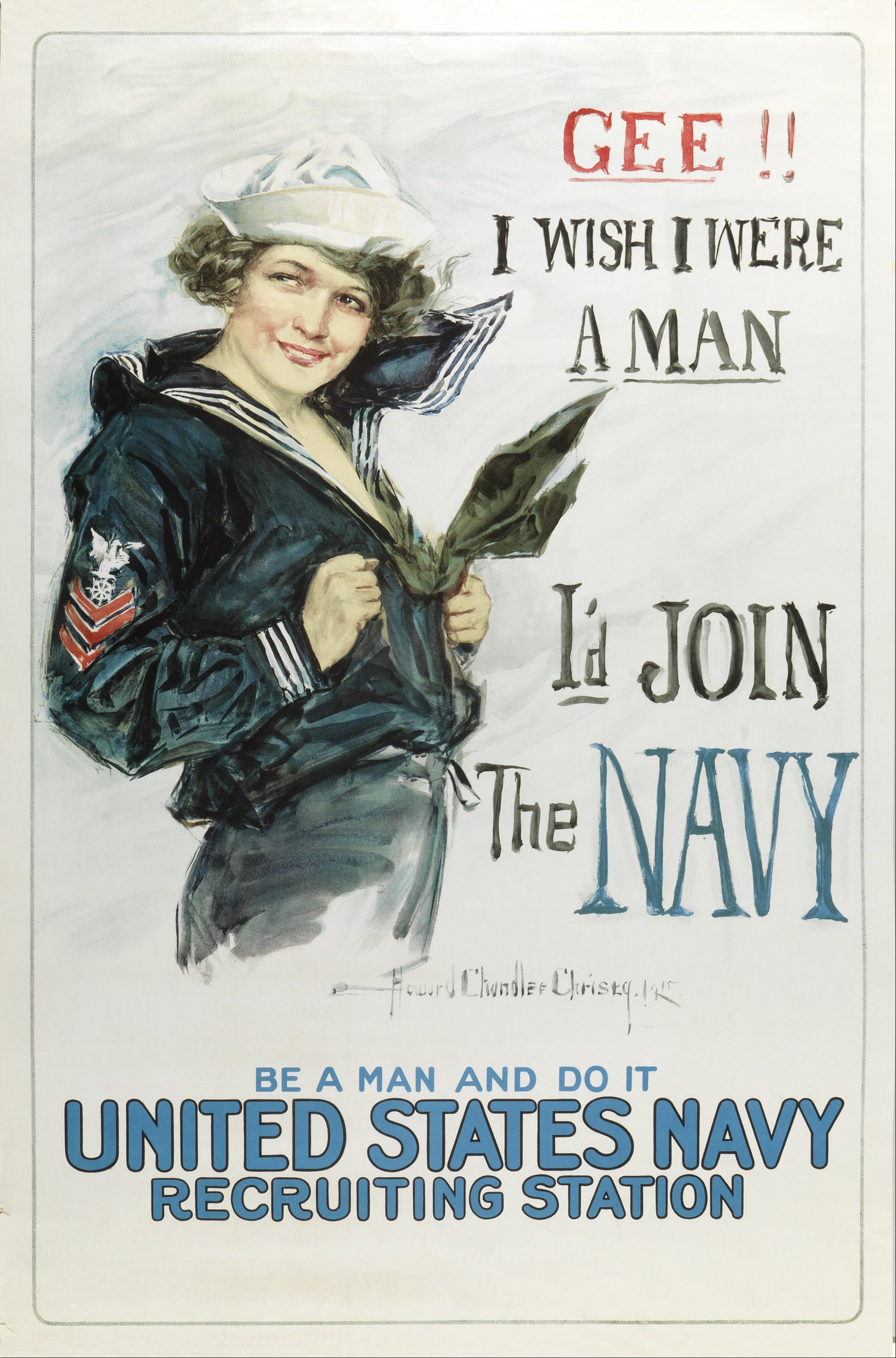
"Gee!! I Wish I Were A Man"

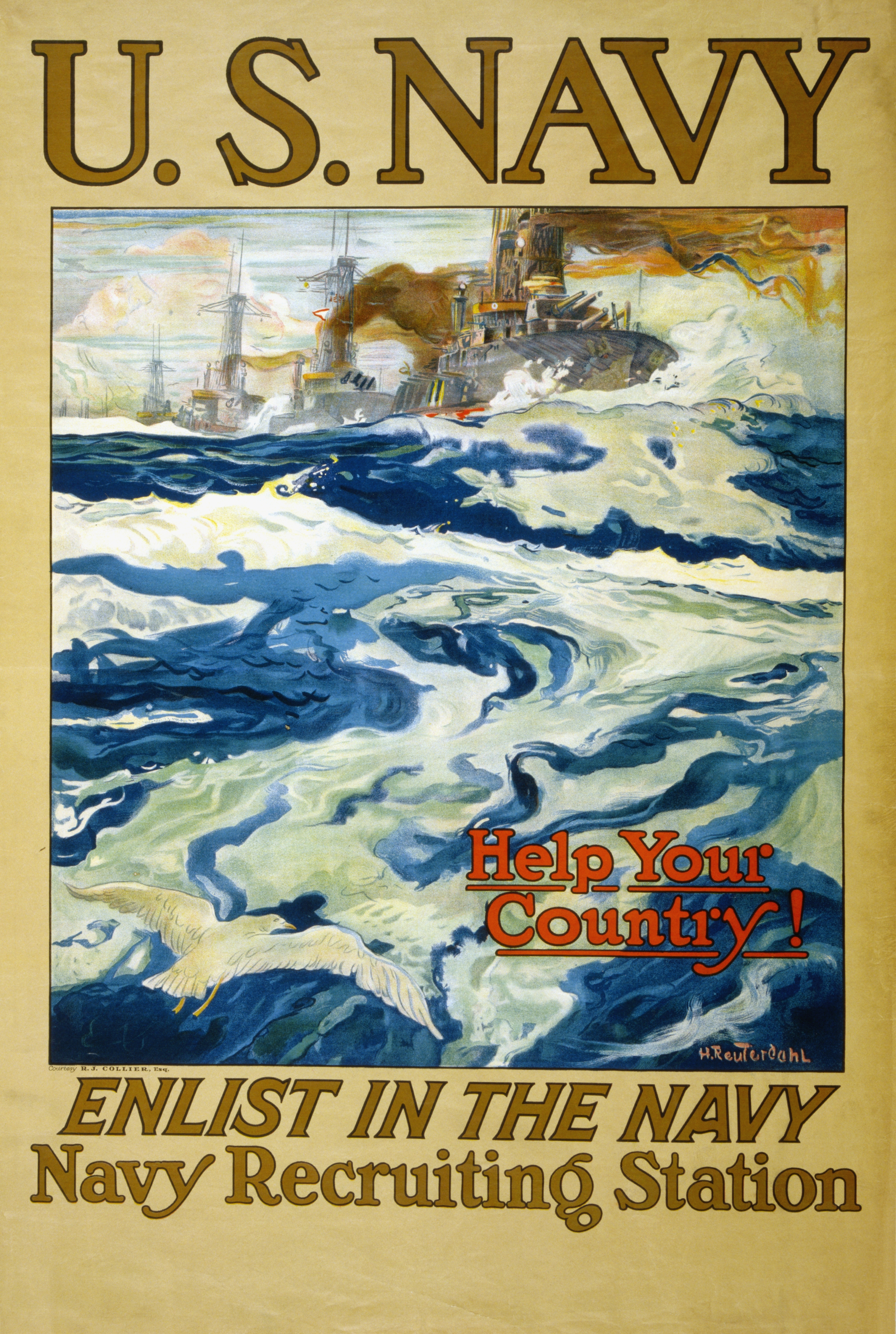
"Help your country! Enlist in the Navy"

"I Want You for the Navy"

== See also ==
- SMS Seeadler
- USS Monocacy incident
