= Diamond Shoal Light =

Lighthouse in North Carolina, United States

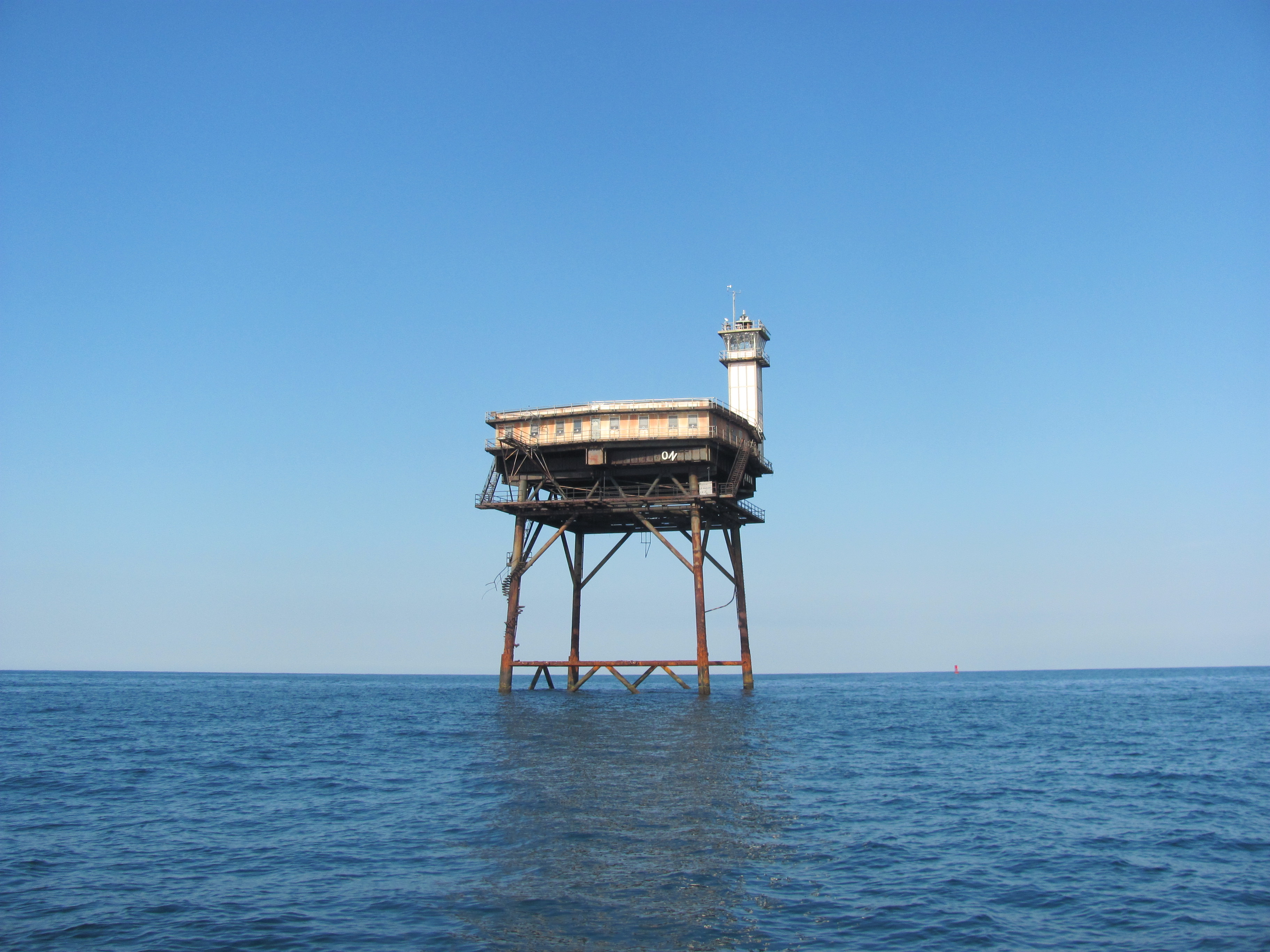
- 2012 photograph of the Diamond Shoal Light
- Location: Dare County, United States
- Coordinates: 35°9′12″N 75°17′48″W

Tower
- Foundation: Four black piles
- Construction: prefabricated modules
- Automated: 1977
- Height: 120 ft
- Shape: White square platform with tower at one corner

Light
- First lit: 1966
- Deactivated: 2001

The Diamond Shoal Light is an inactive offshore lighthouse marking Diamond Shoals off Cape Hatteras.

== History ==
Diamond Shoals, which extend many miles out from Cape Hatteras, is considered to be one of the most dangerous spots on the Atlantic seaboard. While a light was exhibited from the cape itself from 1804, its range was insufficient, and a lightship was stationed on the shoal itself in 1824. It was driven off station numerous times, eventually being wrecked near Ocracoke Inlet in 1827. Various buoys were placed beginning in 1852, but all were short-lived.

In 1889, Congress authorized construction of a permanent lighthouse on the shoal, at a cost not to exceed $500,000. The firm of Anderson & Barr, which had constructed the Fourteen Foot Bank Light in Delaware Bay in 1885-1887, was awarded the contract. A caisson was constructed in Norfolk, Virginia and towed to the site in June 1891. It was sunk into the shoal on July 1 and immediately began to tilt due to the sandy bottom and severe scour by the currents. Addition of iron plates at the top of the structure merely succeeded in keeping it marginally above water. A storm on July 4 drove the work crews away and destroyed the structure. Anderson, who supervised the construction, later claimed that the problem was exacerbated by out of date charts with inaccurate soundings. In any case, construction was abandoned, and $79,000 of the original appropriation was diverted to the construction of a lightship to replace the failed tower.

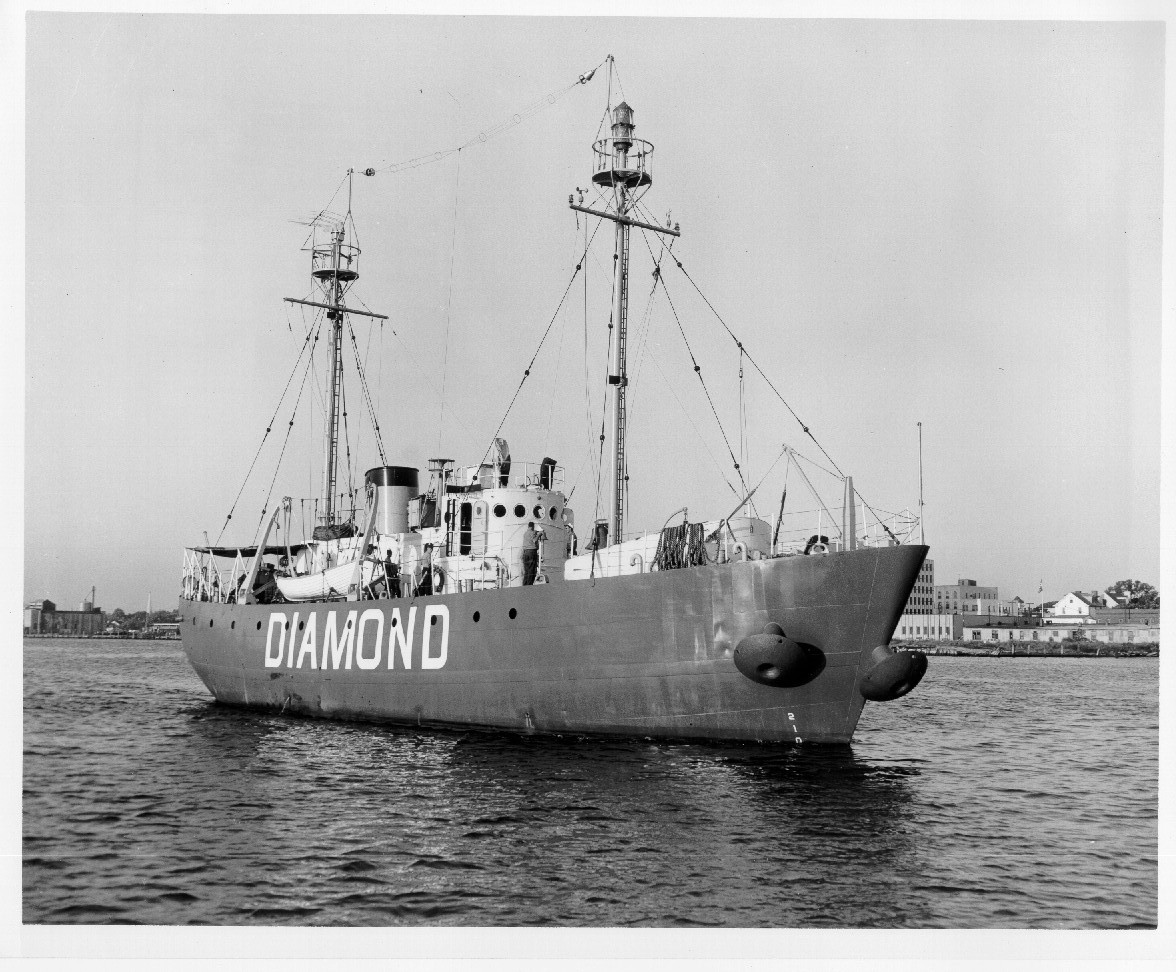
WLV 189, the last lightship stationed at Diamond Shoals (USCG 1962)

That lightship, LV 69, was the first of six lightships employed at Diamond Shoals in the twentieth century. Prior to World War I, lightships were assigned in pairs at this station, which each relieving the other; after LV 71 was sunk by the German submarine U-140, a single ship was assigned, relieved as needed. During World War II the lightship was replaced by a lighted buoy. The last lightship stationed here, WLV 189, was the first lightship built after the Coast Guard took over the Lighthouse Service, and the first all-welded lightship; it was expressly built for service at this station, and remained in service there until 1966.

In the early 1960s, "Texas Tower" lighthouses were erected at six offshore sites on the East coast. Diamond Shoals was the second to last to be built, and was activated in 1966 before being automated in 1977. The unmanned lighthouse suffered significant damage from Hurricane Fran in 1996, and the catwalks were subsequently found to be so rotten that the light could only be safely visited by helicopter. The light was extinguished in 2001, and has since been removed.

Although the light was removed, the tower still stands and is frequented by fishermen for the many species of fish that live below and near it. Amberjack and barracuda are some of the larger fish that call Diamond Shoals light tower their home.

In 2012 the tower, described as needing $2.3 million of repairs, was listed for auction by the General Services Administration. It sold in October of that year for $20,000, to Dave Schneider who plans to restore it. Schneider has since "shaved" about a million dollars off the estimated repairs by using volunteer labor. He plans on using the tower for research by his Minnesota-based company "Zap Water" along with other companies.
