= William P. Cronan =

19th Naval Governor of Guam

William Pigott Cronan
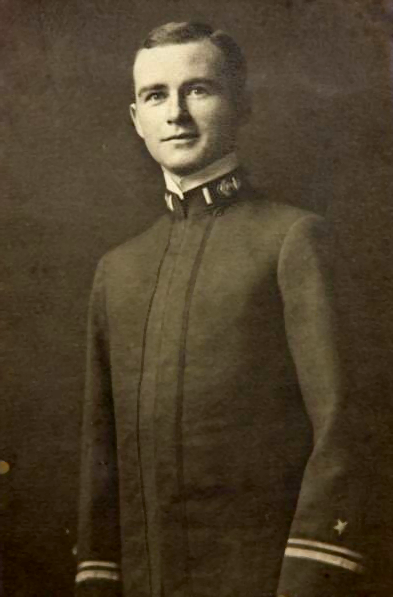
- Cronan in 1903

19th Naval Governor of Guam
- In office April 29, 1916 – May 8, 1916
- Preceded by: William John Maxwell
- Succeeded by: Edward Simpson (governor)

Personal details
- Born: March 6, 1879 New Haven, Connecticut, US
- Died: March 18, 1929 (aged 50) San Diego, California, US
- Education: United States Naval Academy
- Awards: Navy Cross
- Nickname: "the most popular man in the Navy"

Military service
- Allegiance: United States
- Branch/service: United States Navy
- Years of service: 1898–1923
- Rank: Captain
- Commands: USS Monaghan; USS Jouett; USS Komingin der Nederlanden; Atlantic Fleet Torpedo Flotilla Fifth Fleet
- Battles/wars: Spanish–American War; Battle of Santiago de Cuba; World War I

William Pigott Cronan (March 6, 1879 – March 18, 1929) was a United States Navy captain who served as the 19th Naval Governor of Guam. During his tenure in the Navy, he became decorated, commanded a number of ships, and came to be known as "the most popular man in the Navy". He participated in the Battle of Santiago de Cuba during the Spanish–American War. In 1903, he gained some attention for his participation in the rescue of a Venezuelan fisherman off the coast of La Guaira under bad conditions. Both the Venezuelan government and navy command praised him for the way he carried out the operation. He became a national news story in 1907 while serving aboard USS Connecticut during a training operation. When a gun nearly exploded because of leaking powder; he shoved his hand into the gun's breechblock, preventing the explosion and losing two of his fingers in the process.

He served as the first commanding officer of USS Monaghan in 1911. He would later command the Atlantic Fleet Torpedo Flotilla Fifth Fleet from the flagship USS Jouett. During World War I, he first commanded USS Supply and captured German Corvette Captain Adalbert Zuckschwerdt off the coast of Guam. He also commanded USS Komingin der Nederlanden during the war, for which he received the Navy Cross. The house he owned with wife Nellie Grant Cronan, granddaughter of President Ulysses S. Grant, is now an historical site in San Diego. He is buried at Arlington National Cemetery.

== Life ==
Cronan was born on March 6, 1879, to Patrick J. Cronan and Ellen Theresa (Pigott) Cronan in New Haven, Connecticut. His uncle, James P. Pigott, served in the United States House of Representatives from Connecticut. Another uncle, James T. Mullen, was the first Supreme Knight of the Order of the Knights of Columbus.

Cronan was an officer in the New York Yacht Club. He married Nellie Grant, daughter of Jesse Root Grant and granddaughter of President Ulysses S. Grant, in 1913. They had two daughters: Nellie Grant Cronan and Elizabeth Grant Cronan. Nellie was born in Tokyo and married United States Army Captain Franklin Gibney Rothwell in 1942. From 1923 until his death in 1929 Cronan lived in San Diego, California, in the William and Nell Cronan House, now considered an historical resource by the city. During his time in the Navy, he was known as "the most popular man in the Navy". He is buried at Arlington National Cemetery.

== Naval career ==
Cronan graduated from the United States Naval Academy in 1898. While still a naval cadet he served aboard USS Marblehead. Upon graduation, he participated in the Battle of Santiago de Cuba of the Spanish–American War aboard USS Brooklyn. He also served aboard USS Iowa as an ensign. He subsequently served aboard USS Don Juan de Austria, leaving the ship in 1901. In 1903, while serving aboard USS Marietta, Cronan and eight enlisted men rescued a Venezuelan fisherman off the coast of La Guaira under dangerous conditions, for which he received praise from the Venezuelan government and his superior officers. He also served with the Judge Advocate General's Corps, U.S. Navy.

In 1907, he gained some fame for an incident aboard USS Connecticut during a target practice exercise. Believing an explosion imminent within the breechblock of one of the ship's guns, Cronan shoved his hand within the block to prevent its closing. He prevented any explosion and lost two fingers of his right hand in the process.

In 1911, Cronan became the first commanding officer of USS Monaghan as a lieutenant commander. During his time in command, the ship struck a naval pier at full speed and took several hours to get loose. In 1913 he became the commander of the newly formed Atlantic Fleet Torpedo Flotilla Fifth Fleet and also commanded his flagship USS Jouett. Cronan served in World War I as the commanding officer of USS Komingin der Nederlanden, a transport ship, for which he received the Navy Cross. He retired as a captain on October 4, 1923.

== Governorship ==
Cronan served as acting Naval Governor of Guam from April 29, 1916, to May 8, 1916. As the ranking officer present, he took command from outgoing governor William John Maxwell pending the arrival of appointee Roy Campbell Smith. Cronan remained in Guam after his tenure as governor as commander of USS Supply. He captured German Corvette Captain Adalbert Zuckschwerdt after the German officer exploded SMS Cormoran rather than allow her to be captured in Apra Harbor during World War I. He reportedly greeted Zuckschwerdt with the accolade "Sir, you are a brave man."
