= United States lightship Diamond Shoal (LV-71) =

Lightship of the United States Lighthouse Service sunk during World War I

Coordinates: 35°5′11.44″N 75°19′38.06″W

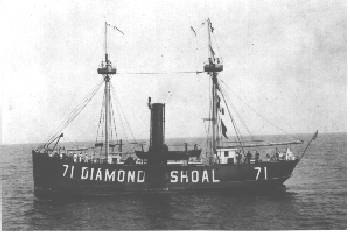

History

United States
- Name: Diamond Shoal Lightship No. 71 (LV-71)
- Builder: Bath Iron Works
- Launched: 1897
- Home port: Hatteras, North Carolina
- Fate: Sunk by U-140, 6 August 1918

General characteristics
- Type: lightship
- Complement: 12 officers and men
- Light Vessel 71 (shipwreck)
- U.S. National Register of Historic Places
- Nearest city: Buxton, North Carolina
- NRHP reference No.: 15000541
- Added to NRHP: August 19, 2015

Diamond Shoal Lightship No. 71 (LV-71) was a lightship of the United States Lighthouse Service. She is most remembered for her sinking in 1918 during World War I when a German U-boat attacked her off North Carolina. Her shipwrecked remains were listed on the National Register of Historic Places in 2015.

== Design ==
LV-71 was built in 1897 by Bath Iron Works in Maine with a wooden hull and a steel keel and braces. She also had a cluster of three 100 cp electric lens lanterns mounted in a gallery at each masthead, a twelve-inch steam chime whistle and a hand-operated fog bell weighing 1,000 pounds. The ship's propulsion was supplied by a single surface condensing engine and a Scotch fired boiler, with a four- bladed propeller. She was 122 feet long with a beam width of 28 feet and a draft of 13 feet, weighing 590 tons. LV-71 had a speed of 8.5 knots and was equipped with telegraph in 1904, and an eighteen-inch searchlight in 1905.

== Career ==
The ship was assigned to Diamond Shoal Light near Hatteras, North Carolina on March 9, 1898, though she was originally intended to patrol Overfall Shoal in Delaware Bay. For the next twenty years, until her sinking, LV-71 remained at Diamond Shoals, alternating out with LV-69. In 1912 LV-71 was modernized again and was fitted with a two-way radio.

=== World War I ===
Upon America's entry into World War I on April 6 of 1917, LV-71 continued to operate as she had for the past several years. On August 6, 1918, exactly one year and four months after the United States' declaration of war on Germany, the lightship was on station off Cape Hatteras, North Carolina, when her crew sighted the American cargo ship SS Merak sinking nearby. The Merak had been sailing off Diamond Shoals from New York City to the West Indies when Commander Waldemar Kophamel, of the submarine U-140, attacked her with torpedoes. One of Merak's crewmen spotted the wake of a torpedo, so the ship took to evasive maneuvers and grounded in the process. The Germans then surfaced and began bombarding the Americans with a deck gun, but the ship's crew successfully escaped without being harmed. LV-71 rescued the survivors; her skipper Master Walter Barnett then sent out a warning to alert friendly ships in the area of a U-boat's presence in the vicinity of the lightship. The signal was intercepted by U-140, which quickly returned to the scene and sank LV-71 with gunfire after letting her twelve-member crew and the survivors of the Merak row towards shore in a lifeboat. The two sinkings occurred about twelve miles off the coast; residents of the nearby town of Hatteras could hear the sounds of the naval gunfire. LV-71 was the first and only United States lightship sunk by enemy action.

== See also ==
- List of lightships of the United States
- United States Navy operations during World War I
- Torpedo Alley (North Carolina)
- American Theater (1914-1918)
