= Zuckschwerdt =

Zuckschwerdt is a German surname. Notable people with the surname include:

- Adalbert Zuckschwerdt (1874–1945), German military officer
- Wolfgang Zuckschwerdt (1949–2026), German judo athlete
- Sandra Köppen-Zuckschwerdt (born 1975), German judoka
