= Scuttling of SMS Cormoran =

- Part of the Asian and Pacific theatre of World War I
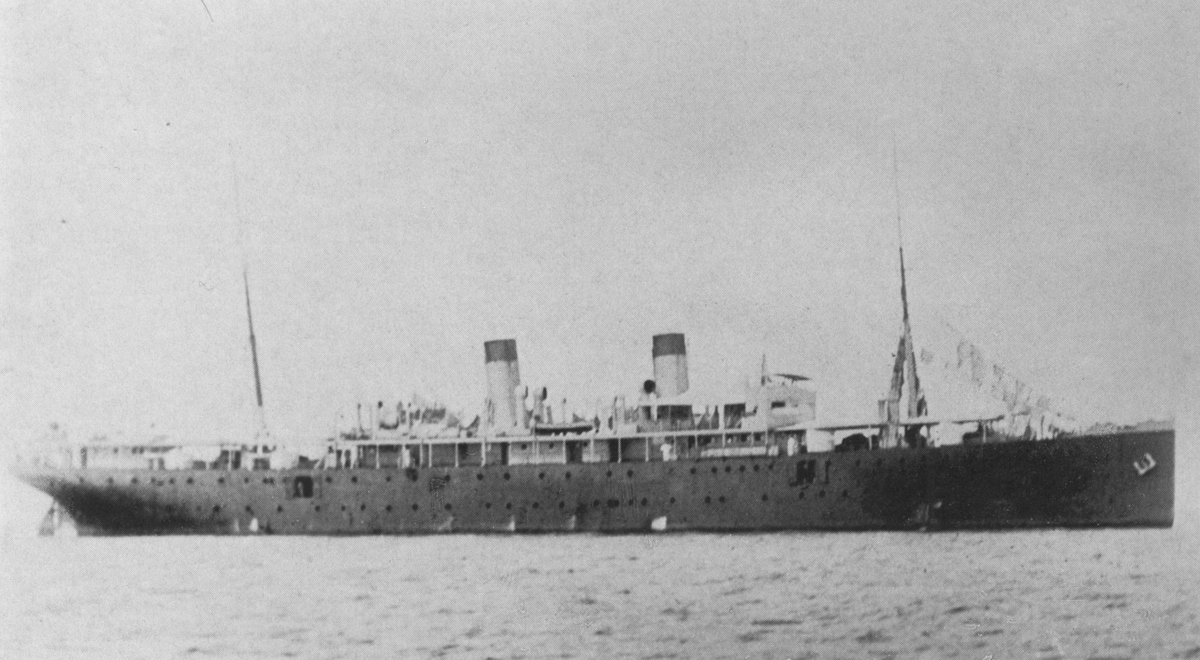
- SMS Cormoran
Date	April 7, 1917
Location	Apra Harbor, Guam, Pacific Ocean
Result	American victory

Belligerents
United States	German Empire

Commanders and leaders
Roy Campbell Smith	(German Empire) Adalbert Zuckschwerdt

Strength
Land: 3 artillery pieces 1 artillery battery Sea: Auxiliary cruiser Supply	Auxiliary cruiser Cormoran

Casualties and losses
None	9 killed Cormoran scuttled Surviving crew captured

The Scuttling of SMS Cormoran off Guam on April 7, 1917 was the result of the United States entry into World War I and the internment of the German merchant raider SMS Cormoran. The incident was the only hostile encounter between the United States and German military forces during the Pacific Ocean campaign of the war.

== Background ==
SMS Cormoran was originally a passenger and cargo ship, named SS Ryaezan and built by the Germans in 1909 for the Russian merchant fleet. When the war broke out, she was captured off Korea by SMS Emden and transformed into an auxiliary cruiser. Cormoran was armed with eight 10.5 cm (4.1 in) rapid fire guns from the original Cormoran and commanded by Captain Adalbert Zuckschwerdt. The number of crew she had on board is unknown. Setting out from Qingdao on August 10, 1914 for a commerce raiding cruise in the South Pacific, SMS Cormoran failed to sink any enemy shipping as she spent all of her time avoiding allied warships.

Captain Zuckschwerdt pulled into Apra Harbor, Guam on December 14 with the intention of receiving coal from the Americans on the island. The United States was a neutral power at this time so the Germans were refused the proper amount of coal needed to continue their voyage, there was little coal on the island for the Americans and Guamanians themselves. So the German sailors were interned and for about two years they lived among the Americans and Guamanians in friendship until the American entry into World War I.

== Scuttling ==
When war was declared on April 7, 1917, the United States Marines and sailors on Guam were notified and set out from their base. They embarked the old screw schooner USS Supply with the goal of capturing the auxiliary cruiser, or destroying it. Not wanting to anger the Germans they had lived with for two years and not wanting to expose the Guamanians to needless harm; the Americans resorted to first requesting that the Germans surrender peacefully. In case anything went wrong, the artillery battery of three 7 inch guns on the western face of Mount Tenjo was also trained on the vessel. Before Captain Zuckschwerdt could refuse surrender a group of United States Navy sailors on the deck of USS Supply noticed that the Germans were preparing to scuttle their vessel instead of surrendering or attempting an escape.

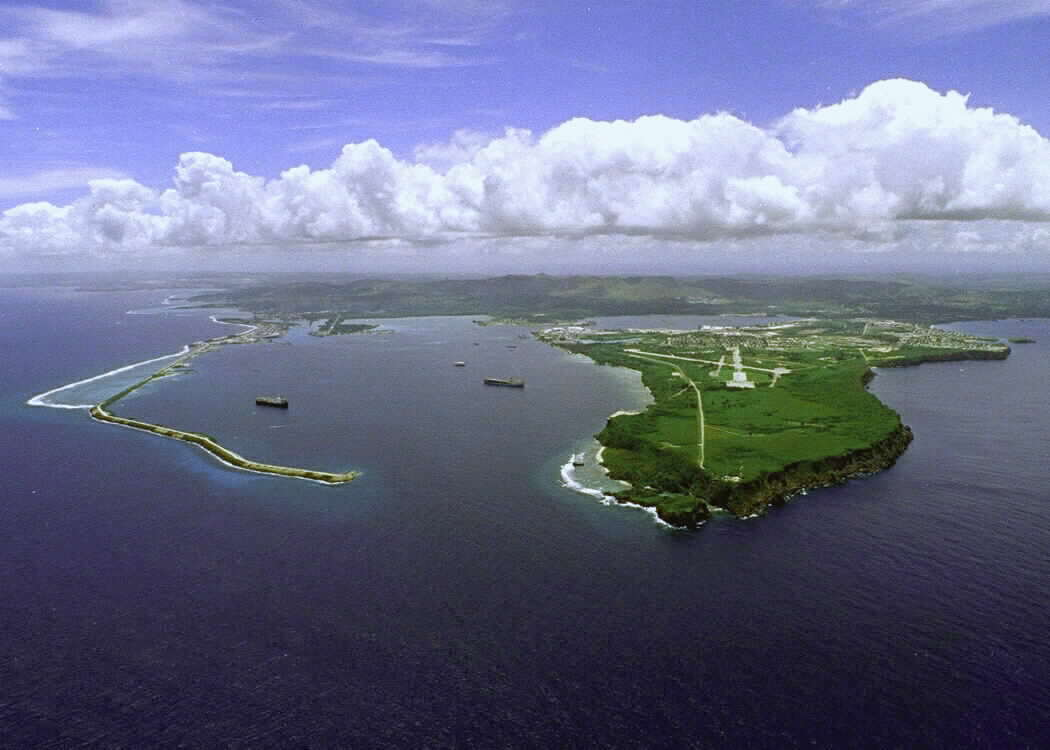
An aerial view of Apra Harbor.

The sailors notified the Marines so one of the Americans fired a shot across the German ship's bow with his rifle. The shot was the first to be fired by the United States at the Germans after war had been declared. A similar incident occurred in 1915 at Fort San Felipe del Morro in the Caribbean, America's very first shot was fired, at a different German auxiliary cruiser which was also interned in a neutral American port. Despite the warning shot, which alarmed the Germans, the scuttling continued but at a faster pace. The Germans finished setting their explosives and they began to evacuate. The Cormoran exploded and sank to the bottom of the harbor where she remains today. USS Supply quickly became a hospital ship when she came to the aid of the German lifeboats.

Accounts of the event differ but what is known is that nine Germans were killed while scuttling the Cormoran, either by the explosion which crippled the ship or by the American marines who did not want the Cormoran sunk. The rest of the German crew were captured by the Americans and the dead were buried on Guam with full military honors. The prisoners were sent to various American forts until finally being released after World War I in 1919.

SMS Cormoran rests 110 feet (34 m) below the water of Apra harbor on her port side. A Japanese cargo ship, the Tokai Maru, which was sunk during World War II leans up against her screw. Together the ships are one of the few places where a diver can visit a sunken vessel of World War I next to a sunken vessel of World War II. The shipwreck was placed on the National Register of Historic Places in 1975 due to its association with the First World War.

== See also ==
- Fort San Felipe del Morro
- Scuttling of the German fleet at Scapa Flow
