= William John Maxwell =

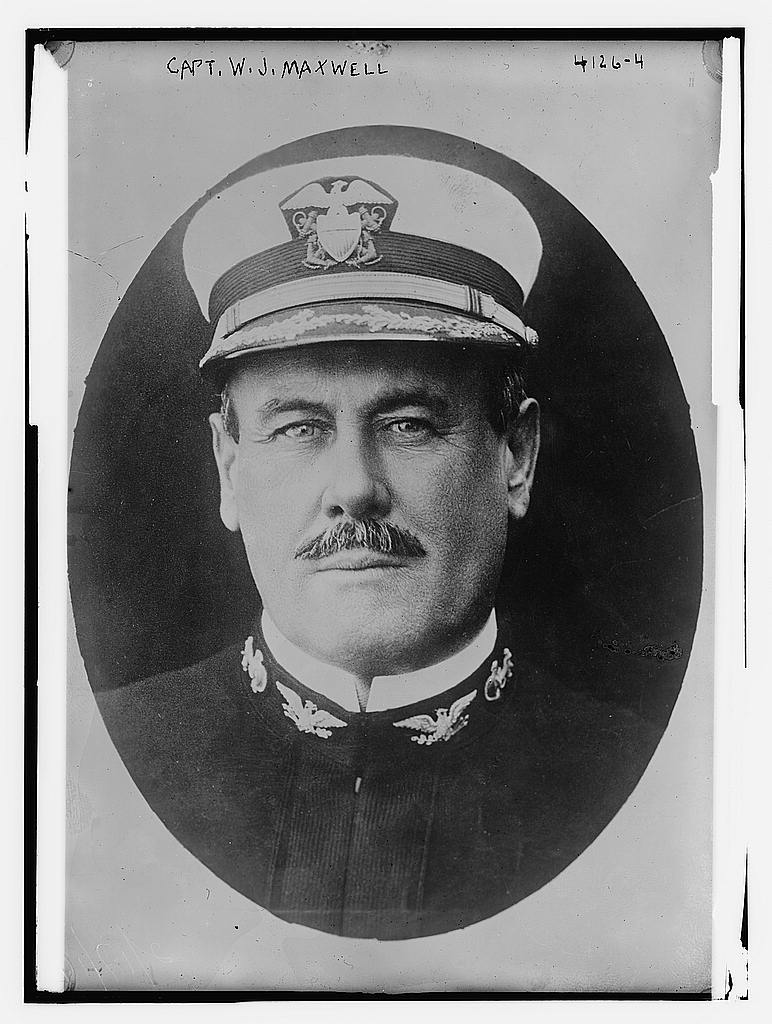

18th Naval Governor of Guam
- In office March 28, 1914 – April 29, 1916
- Preceded by: Alfred Walton Hinds
- Succeeded by: William P. Cronan

Personal details
- Education: United States Naval Academy

Military service
- Allegiance: United States
- Branch/service: United States Navy
- Rank: Captain
- Commands: USS Mississippi; USS Florida

William John Maxwell was a United States Navy officer who served as the 18th Naval Governor of Guam. He entered the United States Naval Academy in 1874, but was not commissioned as an ensign until 1883. He served aboard many ships before becoming one of the inaugural members of the General Board of the United States Navy. Afterward, he commanded both USS Mississippi and USS Florida.

After becoming governor in 1914, Maxwell instituted a number of reforms, including establishing the Bank of Guam and the Guam Insular Patrol Force. He also reorganized the tax system and stressed the building and improvement of new roads. His plans to give Guamanians United States citizenship was rejected by then-Assistant Secretary of the Navy Franklin Delano Roosevelt. Guam became the center an international relations incident when the German SMS Cormoran made port there asking for coal at a time when the United States remained neutral in World War I. Maxwell refused to break neutrality by providing fuel and supplies, forcing the ship to stay in port for the next two years. Maxwell attracted controversy during his term, particularly when he approved the first execution on the island since the US takeover. Eventually, a lower-ranking officer, William P. Cronan, placed Maxwell on the sick list, despite his protest, and removed him from power, taking the office himself. The Navy launched an inquiry into the appropriateness and motives of the dismissal, but nonetheless, Maxwell, declared perfectly healthy by mainland doctors, was reassigned to the Naval War College.

== Naval career ==
Maxwell was appointed to the United States Naval Academy on June 8, 1874. On March 3, 1883, he was commissioned as an ensign junior grade, and an ensign on June 26, 1884. He served aboard the training ship USS Jamestown from 1883 to 1885. On July 4, 1893, he was promoted to Lieutenant (junior grade). From July 1890 to March 1891, he served aboard the USS Dolphin, before becoming the Assistant to the Inspector of the 5th Lighthouse District in July 1892.

In 1900, Maxwell began his assignment aboard USS Isla de Cuba. In 1905, as a Lieutenant Commander, he served as Chief Engineer on USS Maryland's commissioning crew. In 1910 as a Commander, he served as one of the first members of the General Board of the United States Navy. On November 12, 1911, he left Hampton Roads, Virginia commanding USS Mississippi, after being placed in command two days before. He continued in this position until 1912. In 1913, he commanded USS Florida.

== Governorship ==
Maxwell served as Naval Governor of Guam from March 28, 1914 to April 29, 1916. During his term, a typhoon hit in the summer of 1914, leaving a shortage of rice and corn crops. As governor, he established a number of government organizations, some still in existence. These organizations include the Guam Insular Patrol Force, the civilian predecessor to the Guam Police Department, as well as the Bank of Guam. He reorganized the taxation system by raising property assessments and stressed road building. The bank opened in January 1916 and helped many islanders obtain loans to open small businesses. He also served as the first chairman of the Guamanian chapter of the American Red Cross and organized its first fundraising drive. In 1914, Maxwell proposed granting United States citizenship to the people of Guam. However, Franklin Delano Roosevelt, then Assistant Secretary of the Navy, rejected the plan, claiming that making Guamanians citizens was not in the best interest of the country. He also asked that Guam be made an open port of trade to all ships, believing this would reduce the local's dependence on government assistance for food.

In December 1914, Maxwell found himself at the center of a diplomatic incident when the German Empire ship SMS Cormoran stopped in Guam to resupply on coal. Maxwell, under orders to maintain American neutrality in the recently begun World War I, refused the ship supplies, instead forcing it to voluntarily inter itself at the island for the next two years.

Near the end of his term, Maxwell began coming into conflict with the islanders. He attracted some controversy when he outlawed public whistling, hoping to curtail mischievous local boys from whistling an incorrect cadence as sailors marched. He attracted larger anger when he ordered the first execution on the island since the United States had assumed control of it; despite numerous pleas to commute the sentence to life imprisonment, the man, Filipino Pablo Corpus, was executed for murder on February 4, 1916 by hanging. On April 29, 1916, William P. Cronan relieved Maxwell after involuntarily placing him on the sick list. However, upon transportation to the mainland United States, he was found to be perfectly healthy and reassigned to the Naval War College. The Navy launched an inquiry, led by Captain William R. Shoemaker, into the events surrounding Maxwell's dismissal and placement on the list by an officer of a lower rank. It was alleged that Cronan, then aide to the governor, disagreed with several of Maxwell's policies and used improper and unprofessional methods to oust him and take the position for himself.

== Legacy ==
The Maxwell School, named after the governor, was built in Santa Rita, Guam in the early 1930s, but does not exist today.
