= USS Jouett (DD-41) =

Paulding-class destroyer

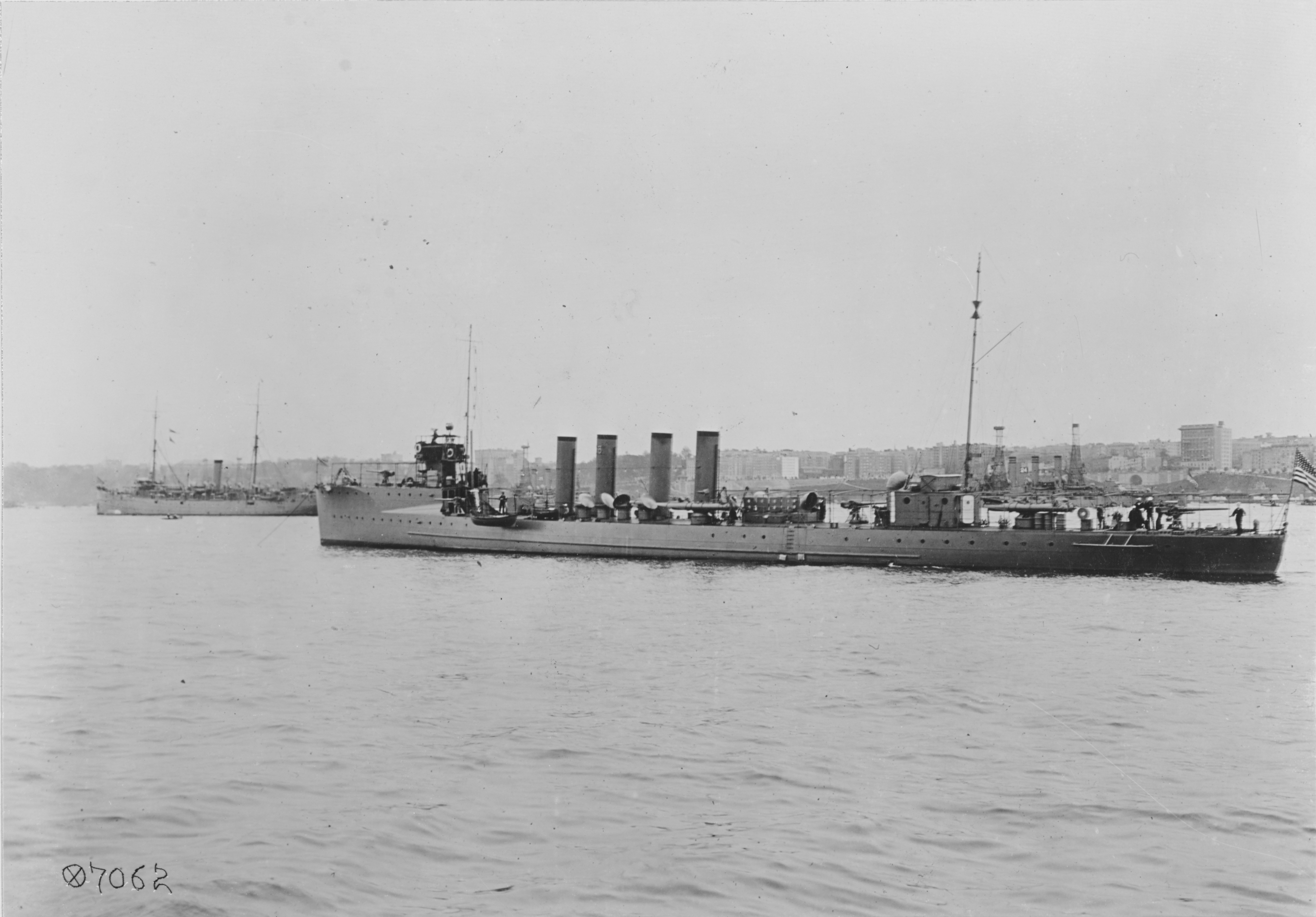
- USS Jouett (DD-41) anchored in the Hudson River off New York City, during the October 1912 Naval Review. USS Rhode Island (BB-17) is in the left background.

History

United States
- Name: Jouett
- Namesake: Rear admiral James Edward Jouett
- Builder: Bath Iron Works, Bath, Maine
- Cost: $665,513.66
- Laid down: 7 March 1911
- Launched: 15 April 1912
- Sponsored by: Miss Marylee Nally
- Commissioned: 24 May 1912
- Decommissioned: 12 December 1919
- Stricken: 5 July 1934
- Identification: Hull symbol:DD-41; Code letters:NIE
- Fate: Transferred to the United States Coast Guard, 23 April 1924; Sold to Michael Flynn of Brooklyn and broken up for scrap in 1934
- Name: Jouett
- Acquired: 28 April 1924
- Commissioned: 23 August 1924
- Decommissioned: 16 May 1931
- Identification: Hull symbol:CG-13
- Fate: returned to the US Navy, 22 May 1934

General characteristics
- Class & type: Paulding-class destroyer
- Displacement: 742 long tons (754 t) normal; 887 long tons (901 t) full load
- Length: 293 ft 10 in (89.56 m)
- Beam: 27 ft (8.2 m)
- Draft: 8 ft 4 in (2.54 m) (mean)
- Installed power: 12,000 ihp (8,900 kW)
- Propulsion: 4 × boilers; 3 × Parsons Direct Drive Turbines; 3 × shafts
- Speed: 29.5 kn (33.9 mph; 54.6 km/h); 32.27 kn (37.14 mph; 59.76 km/h) (Speed on Trial)
- Complement: 4 officers 87 enlisted
- Armament: 5 × 3 in (76 mm)/50 caliber guns; 6 × 18 inch (450 mm) torpedo tubes (3 × 2)

The first USS Jouett (DD-41) was a modified Paulding-class destroyer in the United States Navy during World War I and later in the United States Coast Guard, designated as CG-13. She was named for Rear admiral James Edward Jouett.

Jouett was laid down on 7 March 1911 by Bath Iron Works, Ltd., Bath, Maine; launched on 15 April 1912; sponsored by Miss Marylee Nally; and commissioned at Boston, Massachusetts on 24 May 1912, Lieutenant Commander W. P. Cronan in command.

== Pre-World War I ==
Jouett joined the Atlantic Fleet Torpedo Flotilla and operated off the East Coast until early 1914, when events in Mexico threatened American interests and officials at Tampico arrested American sailors without cause. Jouett supported the landing of Marines at Veracruz on 21 April 1914. Returning to the East Coast after this operation, the destroyer continued to carry out training maneuvers until the United States entered World War I in April 1917.

== World War I ==
The ship was assigned patrol in Delaware Bay in April 1917 and remained on that duty until sailing from New York on 8 August as an escort for five troopships bound for France. After returning from Europe, Jouett resumed patrolling until she arrived at New London, Connecticut, on 15 January 1918 for experimentation with antisubmarine detection devices. Completing this duty on 4 June, the ship operated until the armistice with a special anti-submarine group along the East Coast of the United States.

== Inter-war period ==
Following the war, Jouett conducted training exercises and fleet maneuvers until entering Philadelphia Navy Yard on 20 July 1919. She decommissioned on 24 November and remained inactive until being loaned to the Coast Guard on 23 April 1924 for use as a cutter. Returned to the Navy on 22 May 1931, she was sold for scrap to Michael Flynn Inc, Brooklyn, New York.
