= Waldemar Kophamel =

- Born: August 16, 1880; Graudenz
- Died: November 4, 1934 (aged 54); Plön
- Military career
- Allegiance: German Empire
- Branch: Kaiserliche Marine
- Service years: 1898 – 1920
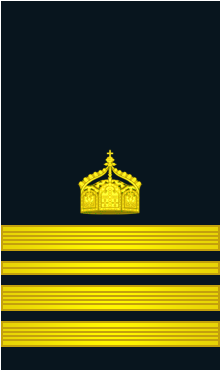
- Rank: Fregattenkapitän
- Commands: U-35, Nov 3, 1914 – November 12, 1915; U-151, July 21, 1917 – December 26, 1918; U-140, Mar 28, 1918 – November 11, 1918
- Conflicts: U-boat Campaign (World War I)
- Awards: Knight's Cross with Swords of the Royal House Order of Hohenzollern; Order of the Red Eagle 4th class Pour le Mérite

Waldemar Kophamel (August 16, 1880 – November 4, 1934) was a highly decorated German U-boat commanding officer in the Imperial German Navy during World War I.

Kophamel joined the Imperial German Navy on 12 April 1898 and started his military education on a ship named SMS Stosch. At the start of the First World War Kophamel was a Kapitänleutnant and commanded U-35. In October 1915 he was promoted to Korvettenkapitän and in December of that year took command of the Pola Flotilla. In July 1917 he returned to sea, in command of U-151 and later U-140. During the war he succeeded sank 55 ships of a total tonnage of 157,473 gross register tons (GRT), including a large American tanker O. B. Jennings of 10,289 GRT and a former merchant ship taken up by the Royal Navy as HMS Tara of 1,862 GRT. He damaged four ships totaling 8,701 GRT, and two warships including HMS Parthian.

One of his notable actions was sinking the US lightship LV-71 off the coast of the United States. The crew, as well as survivors from another of his victims, USS Merak, a freighter seized by the US and assigned to the Naval Overseas Transportation Service, escaped the lightship and rowed to shore.

From April 1919 until June 1920, he commanded the light cruiser SMS Strassburg. Kophamel was promoted to Fregattenkapitän on 31 August 1920, the day he left the service. He died in 1934.

The submarine tender Waldemar Kophamel was named in his honor in 1939 and served in the German Navy until sunk by the Royal Air Force on 18 December 1944. After the war, it was raised by the USSR, renamed Kuban, and served with the Soviet Navy until 1978.

== Awards and decorations ==
- Order of the Red Eagle, 4th class (Prussia)
- Lifesaving Medal (Prussia)
- Iron Cross (1914), 1st and 2nd class
- Knight's Cross of the Royal House Order of Hohenzollern with Swords
- Pour le Mérite
- Hanseatic Cross of Hamburg
- Military Merit Cross, 1st class (Mecklenburg-Schwerin)
