= Tokai Maru =

Japanese passenger-cargo ship sunk in Apra Harbor, Guam

- U.S. National Register of Historic Places
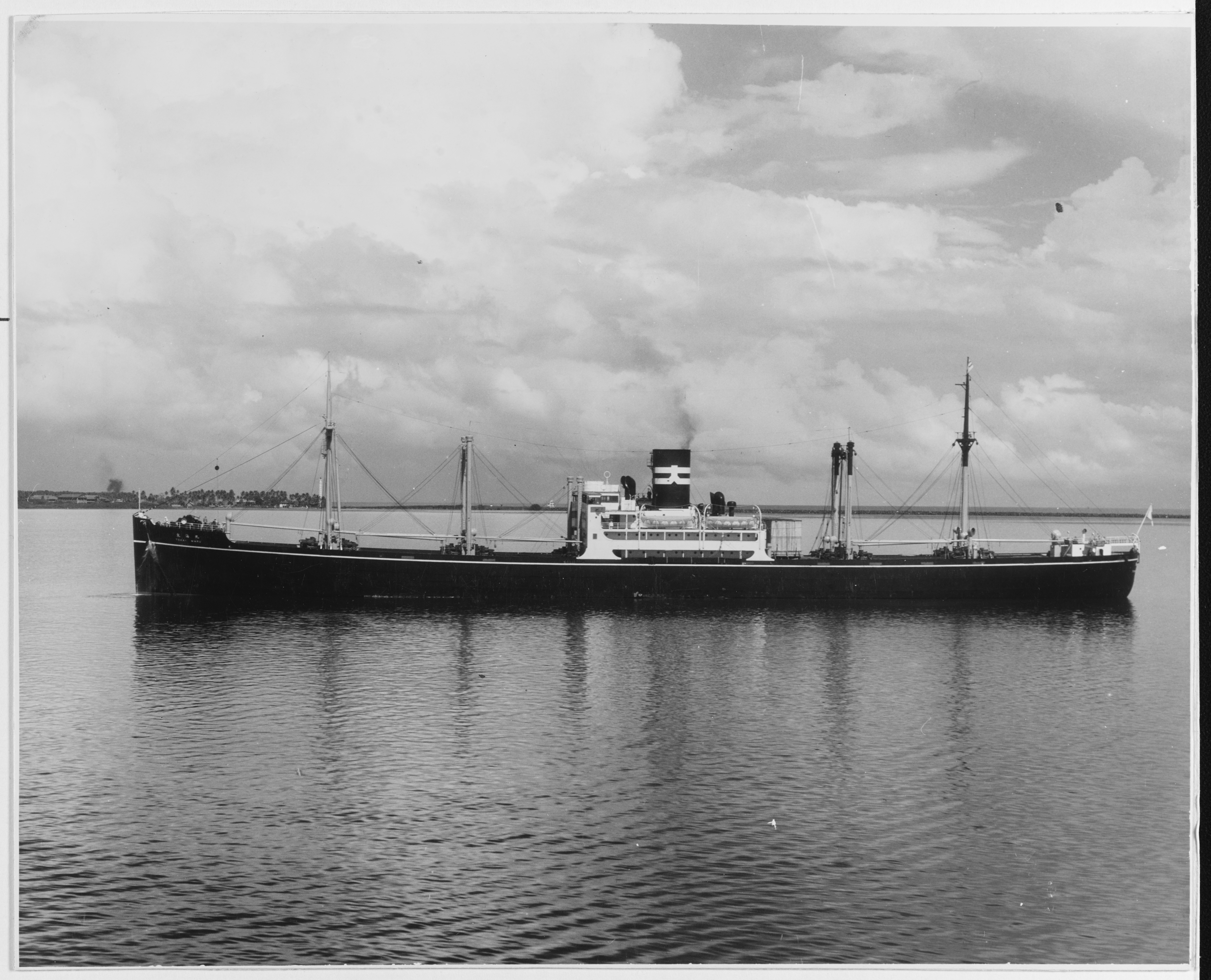
- Tokai Maru, in Limon Bay, Christobal Panama Canal Zone, 20 September 1937

- Location within Guam
- Location: Apra Harbor
- Coordinates: 13°27′33″N 144°39′15″E
- Area: less than one acre
- Built by: Mitsubishi Heavy Industries Shipyard
- Architectural style: Military transport
- NRHP reference No.: 88000967
- Added to NRHP: July 14, 1988

Wreck of Tokai Maru
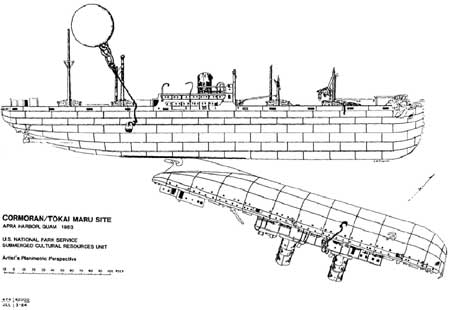
- Tokai Maru lies at the top of this National Park Service illustration. The drive shaft of Cormoran lies closest to the bottom of the Tokai. The buoy used by recreational scuba divers is marked.
- Dive type: Open-water, Deep, Wreck
- Depth range: 60 to 120 ft (18 to 37 m)
- Average visibility: 25 to 40 ft (7.6 to 12.2 m)
- Entry type: Boat, very rarely shore
- Bottom composition: Metal, silt
- Nearby sites: SMS Cormoran

Tokai Maru was a Japanese passenger-cargo ship built by the Mitsubishi Heavy Industries shipyard that was sunk in Apra Harbor, Guam, in 1943, during World War II.

It had served as a fast ship service between New York City and Japan for Osaka Shosen Co. before World War II; during the war it was used as a military transport ship for the Imperial Japanese Navy.

== History ==
Construction by Mitsubishi Heavy Industries began in 1929, the ship was launched on May 16, 1930, construction was completed on August 14, 1930. Osaka Shosen Co., now Mitsui O.S.K. Lines, used her as a fast luxury freighter for Tokyo-New York City service through the Panama Canal.

In July 1941, the United States closed the Panama Canal to Japanese shipping in retaliation for the Japanese invasion of French Indochina. Tokai Maru, on the eastern side of the Canal, was forced to sail back to Japan through the Strait of Magellan.

The ship was then requisitioned as a war-time transport freighter, a class of ships known as ‘Ippan Choyosen’ that were not officially part of the Imperial Japanese Navy and had civilian crews. The ship went under contract to the Japanese Navy at the Kure Naval Arsenal on October 17, 1941. She was tasked with transporting men and material throughout the Pacific. She would have been armed with two 12 cm guns, two twin 25 mm guns, and two single 25 mm guns.

On January 24, 1943, USS Flying Fish spotted Tokai Maru in Apra Harbor, Guam, a U.S. territory then occupied by Japan. After waiting for three days for Tokai Maru to leave the harbor, Flying Fish fired two torpedoes at Tokai, running at 15-foot (4.6 m) depth. One ran aground but the other struck Tokai, inflicting significant damage, but did not sink her. Seven months later, in August 1943, USS Snapper spotted Tokai Maru and another vessel moored in the northeast corner of Apra Harbor. She waited seven days for the Japanese ships to leave before sailing to the north of the harbor on August 27, 1943, and firing three torpedoes at the first target and one at the second. One torpedo hit Tokai's port side #3 cargo hold, sinking her directly on top of the wreck of SMS Cormoran, a World War I German merchant raider.

== Wrecksite ==
The Tokai Maru shipwreck, 120 feet (37 m) under water, is listed on the U.S. National Register of Historic Places, as is the shipwreck of SMS Cormoran, which it lies beside. It is one of the few places where divers can explore a World War I shipwreck next to a ship from World War II.

In 1988 the wreck was placed on the National Register of Historic Places because of its association with World War II.

== See also ==
- Media related to Tokai Maru at Wikimedia Commons
- Foreign commerce and shipping of Empire of Japan
- Underwater diving on Guam
