= SM U-140 =

German submarine

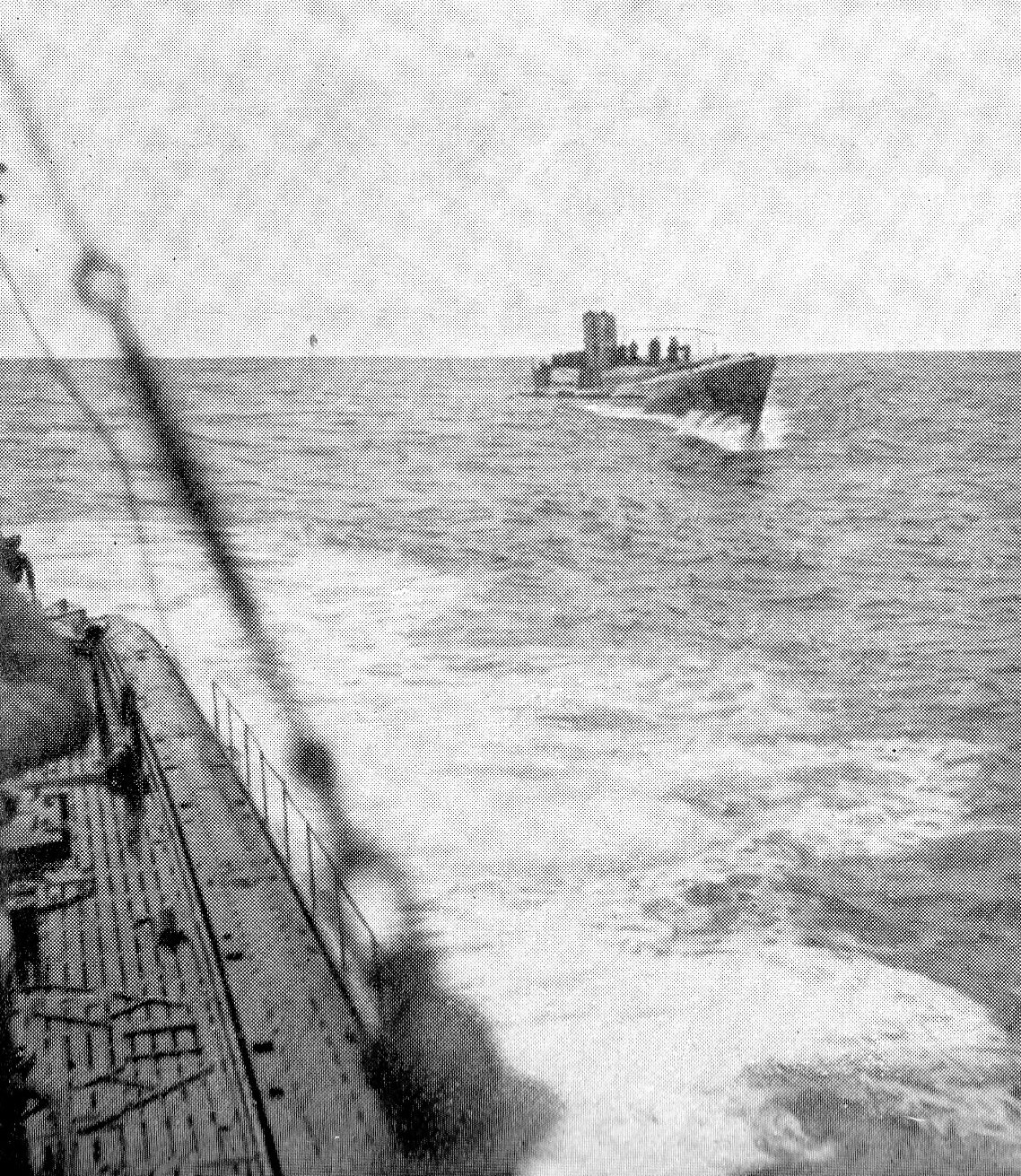
- SM U-140 comes alongside SM U-117 to be supplied with fuel, close to the Faroe Islands, 1918

History

German Empire
- Name: U-140
- Ordered: 1 August 1916
- Builder: Germaniawerft, Kiel
- Yard number: 301
- Launched: 4 November 1917
- Commissioned: 28 March 1918
- In service: 28 March 1918 – 11 November 1918
- Fate: Surrendered 23 February 1919; Sunk as target 22 July 1921

General characteristics
- Class & type: Type U 139 submarine
- Displacement: 1,930 t (1,900 long tons) surfaced; 2,483 t (2,444 long tons) submerged
- Length: 92.00 m (301 ft 10 in) (o/a); 71.50 m (234 ft 7 in) (pressure hull)
- Beam: 9.12 m (29 ft 11 in) (o/a); 5.75 m (18 ft 10 in) (pressure hull)
- Height: 5.27 m (17 ft 3 in)
- Draught: 11.20 m (36 ft 9 in)
- Installed power: 2 × 3,500 PS (2,574 kW; 3,452 shp); 2 × 450 PS (331 kW; 444 shp) surfaced; 2 × 1,780 PS (1,309 kW; 1,756 shp) submerged
- Propulsion: 2 shafts, 2 × 2.10 m (6 ft 11 in) propellers
- Speed: 15.8 knots (29.3 km/h; 18.2 mph) surfaced; 7.6 knots (14.1 km/h; 8.7 mph) submerged
- Range: 17,750 nmi (32,870 km; 20,430 mi) at 8 knots (15 km/h; 9.2 mph) surfaced; 53 nmi (98 km; 61 mi) at 4.5 knots (8.3 km/h; 5.2 mph) submerged
- Test depth: 75 m (246 ft 1 in)
- Complement: 6 (1) officers, 56 (20) enlisted – (prize crew)
- Armament: 6 × 50 cm (19.7 in) torpedo tubes (four bow, two stern); 19-24 torpedoes; 2 × 15 cm (5.9 in) SK L/45 deck guns; 2 × 8.8 cm (3.5 in) SK L/30 deck guns

Service record
- Part of: U-Kreuzer Flotilla; Unknown start – 11 November 1918
- Commanders: K.Kapt. Waldemar Kophamel; 28 March – 11 November 1918
- Operations: 1 patrol
- Victories: 6 merchant ships sunk (30,004 GRT); 1 lightship sunk (590 tons)

SM U-140 was a Type U 139 submarine that served in the Imperial German Navy in World War I. U-140 was engaged in naval warfare and took part in the First Battle of the Atlantic.

After the end of World War I, U-140 surrendered to the United States, which used her for testing. Finally, the United States Navy destroyer USS Dickerson (DD-157) sank her as a target in the Atlantic Ocean off Cape Charles, Virginia, on 22 July 1921.

== Summary of raiding history ==
Date	Name	Nationality	Tonnage (Note: Merchant ship tonnages are in gross register tons. Military vessels are listed by tons displacement.)	Fate
27 July 1918	Porto	Portugal	1,079	Sunk
2 August 1918	Tokuyama Maru	Japan	7,029	Sunk
4 August 1918	O. B. Jennings	United States	10,289	Sunk
5 August 1918	Stanley M. Seaman	United States	1,060	Sunk
6 August 1918	Diamond Shoals LV71	United States Lighthouse Service	590	Sunk
6 August 1918	Merak	United States	3,024	Sunk
21 August 1918	Diomed	United Kingdom	7,523	Sunk

== Bibliography ==
- Etzold, Dominic (2023). Reaping the Whirlwind: The U-Boat War off North America During WWI. Atglen: Schiffer Military History. ISBN 978-0-7643-6704-5
- Gröner, Erich; Jung, Dieter; Maass, Martin (1991). U-boats and Mine Warfare Vessels. German Warships 1815–1945. Vol. 2. Translated by Thomas, Keith; Magowan, Rachel. London: Conway Maritime Press. ISBN 0-85177-593-4.
