= SMS Cormoran (1914) =

German armed merchant raider of WWI scuttled at Guam

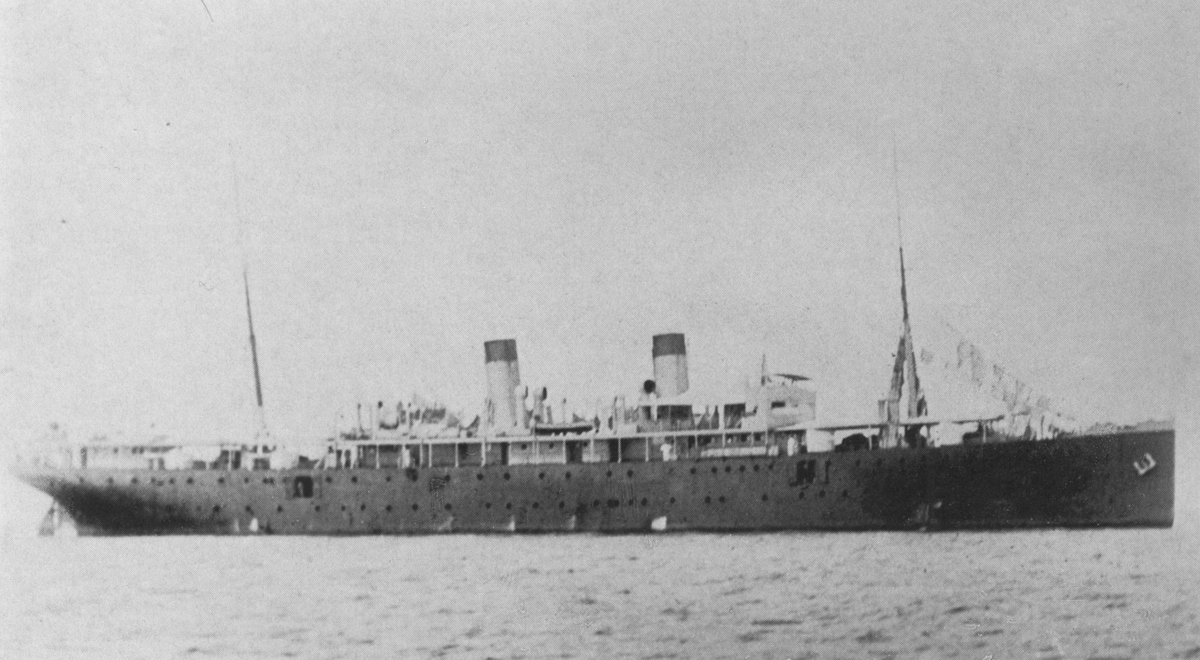
- SMS Cormoran

History

Russian Empire
- Name: Ryazan
- Namesake: Ryazan
- Builder: Schichau Yard at Elbing
- Launched: 1909
- Out of service: 4 August 1914
- Fate: Captured by SMS Emden

German Empire
- Name: SMS Cormoran aka SMS Cormoran II
- Namesake: SMS Cormoran I
- Acquired: 4 August 1914
- Commissioned: 10 August 1914 as SMS Cormoran II
- Fate: Scuttled at Apra Harbor, Guam on 7 April 1917

General characteristics
- Displacement: 3,500 t (3,400 long tons)
- Speed: 17 kn (31 km/h; 20 mph)
- Armament: 8 ×10.5 cm (4.1 in) SK L/35 quick-firing guns
- SMS Cormoran
- U.S. National Register of Historic Places
- Location within Guam
- Location: Apra Harbor
- Nearest city: Piti, Guam
- Coordinates: 13°27′33″N 144°39′15″E
- Area: 0.1 acres (0.040 ha)
- Built: 1909
- NRHP reference No.: 75002156
- Added to NRHP: April 4, 1975

Wreck of SMS Cormoran
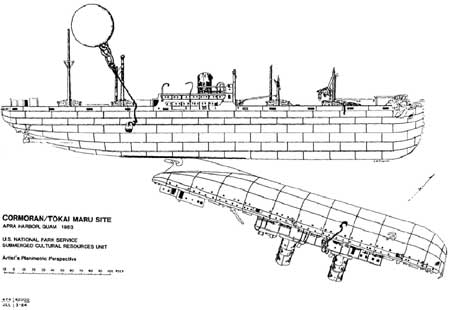
- National Park Service illustration of the position of the Cormoran and Tokai Maru wrecks. The drive shaft of Cormoran lies closest to the bottom of the Tokai
- Dive type: Open-water, Deep, Wreck
- Depth range: 80 to 120 ft (24 to 37 m)
- Average visibility: 25 to 40 ft (7.6 to 12.2 m)
- Entry type: Boat, very rarely shore
- Bottom composition: Metal, silt
- Nearby sites: Tokai Maru

SMS Cormoran or SMS Cormoran II was a German armed merchant raider that was originally a German-built Russian merchant vessel named Ryazan. The ship was active in the Pacific Ocean during World War I. Built in 1909, she was captured by the German light cruiser SMS Emden on 4 August 1914 and converted into a raider at the German colony Kiautschou. She was forced to seek port at Apra Harbor on the US territory of Guam on 10 December 1914. The United States, then declared neutral in the war, refused to supply provisions sufficient for Cormoran to make a German port. After the US declaration of war on April 6, 1917, the Naval Governor of Guam informed Cormoran that she would be seized as a hostile combatant, prompting her crew to scuttle her.

== History ==
Ryazan was built at the Schichau shipyard in Elbing, Imperial Germany in 1909 for the Russian merchant fleet (Rjasan or Rjäsan, from the Russian town of Ryazan). She was used by imperial Russia as a combination passenger, cargo and mail carrier on North Pacific routes.

=== German capture ===
The Ryazan was captured southeast of the Korean peninsula by the German light cruiser SMS Emden on 4 August 1914 as the first prize of World War I from the Russian empire. She was taken to Qingdao in the German colony Kiautschou, where she was converted to an armed merchant raider. The new Cormoran replaced the original SMS Cormoran, a small shallow draft cruiser that had a long Imperial Navy career in the Pacific, having taken part in the events that brought Kiautschou into the German colonial empire in 1897–98. The old Cormoran was laid up at Qingdao with serious maintenance issues and unable to go to sea, and her armaments were transferred to the captured merchant ship.

On 10 August 1914, the new Cormoran (or Cormoran II) left Qingdao harbor and sailed through the South Pacific region. After Japan declared war on the German Empire, her warships discovered and pursued the Cormoran, forcing her to seek refuge in Apra Harbor, in the US Territory of Guam, on 14 December. Having expended most of her fuel raiding commerce, her crew burned much of her woodwork in the boilers in order to make port. With only 50 t (55 short tons) of coal remaining in her bunkers, her captain requested provisions and 1,500 t (1,700 short tons) of coal in order to reach German ports in East Africa.

Due to strained diplomatic relations between the United States and Germany, plus the limited amount of coal stored at Guam, Governor William John Maxwell refused to supply Cormoran with more than a token amount of coal. He ordered the ship to leave within 24 hours or submit to detention. This created a standoff between the German crew and the Americans that lasted nearly two years, until Governor Maxwell was involuntarily placed on the sick list and replaced by his subordinate, William P. Cronan, who decided the German crew should be treated as guests of the United States. The Cormoran was not allowed to leave the harbor, but the crew were treated as friends, achieving a minor celebrity status on the island.

=== Scuttling ===
On the morning of April 7, 1917, word reached Guam by telegraph cable that the US Congress had declared war on Germany. The Naval Governor of Guam, Roy Campbell Smith, sent two officers to inform the Cormoran that a state of war existed between the two countries, that the crew were now prisoners of war, and that the ship must be surrendered. Meanwhile, the USS Supply blocked the entrance to Apra Harbor to prevent any attempt to flee. In a separate boat, the two officers were accompanied by a barge commanded by Lt. W.A. Hall, who was designated prize master, and had brought 18 sailors and 15 Marines from the barracks at Sumay. Seeing a launch from Cormoran hauling a barge of supplies back shore, Hall ordered shots fired across the bow of the launch until it hove to. Meanwhile, the two officers reached Cormoran and informed Captain Adalbert Zuckschwerdt of the situation. Zuckschwerdt agreed to surrender his crew but refused to turn over the ship. The US officers informed Zuckschwerdt that the Cormoran would be treated as an enemy combatant and left to inform Governor Smith of the situation. Unbeknownst to the Americans, the Germans had secreted an explosive device in the ship's coal bunker. Minutes after the Americans left, an explosion aboard Cormoran hurled debris across the harbor and her crew began abandoning ship. The two American boats and USS Supply immediately began to recover German sailors from the water, saving all but seven of the roughly 370 Cormoran crew. This incident, including the warning shots against the launch, accounted for the first violent action of the United States in World War I, first shots fired by the US against Germany in World War I, the first German prisoners of war captured by the US, and the first Germans killed in action by the US in World War I. The shots ordered by Teófilo Marxuach against the merchant ship Odenwald in San Juan Bay on March 21, 1915, predate the US declaration of war against Germany.

The dead crew were buried with full military honors in the naval cemetery at Hagåtña. After the American sailors rescued and made prisoners the surviving Germans, Governor Cronan congratulated Captain Zuckschwerdt for the bravery of his men. The US Navy later conducted a limited salvage operation and the ship's bell was recovered. It is exhibited at the US Naval Academy Museum at Annapolis, Maryland. Other artifacts have been removed by divers over the years.

As the crew waited to be sent to a POW camp on the mainland, they were given permission to erect an obelisk next to their buried dead. Capt. Zuckschwerd was allowed to speak at a ceremony honoring their dead. The obelisk reads, "Den Toten von S.M.S. Cormoran, 7 IV 1917," meaning "To the dead of the S.M.S. Cormoran, 7 April 1917."

The German crew was initially imprisoned in Fort Douglas, Utah. In April 1918, all remaining prisoners of war from Cormoran and SMS Geier were transferred from Fort Douglas to Fort McPherson, Georgia. All returned home on 7 October 1919, almost a year after the war's end.

=== Wreck and commemorations ===
The wreck of the Cormoran II rests 110 ft (34 m) below the surface on her starboard side. A Japanese cargo ship, the Tokai Maru, sunk by the submarine USS Snapper on August 27, 1943, leans against her screw. The wreck is one of the few places where a World War I shipwreck lies next to a ship from World War II.

In 1974, the Cormoran monument in the Naval Cemetery was listed in the National Register of Historic Places (NRHP). In 1975, the wreck itself was placed on the NRHP because of her association with World War I. The National Park Service conducted surveys in 1983 of the SMS Cormoran and Tokai Maru, publishing maps of the two ships' positions. In 1988, a mooring buoy was attached to the Tokai Maru to allow easier access by divers. It is, according to the National Park Service, "probably the most popular wreck diving site on Guam." Over one thousand divers annually visit the wrecks.

The 90th anniversary of the Cormoran's scuttling in 2007 was marked by wreath-laying ceremonies and exhibits and lectures as War in the Pacific National Historic Park. The centenary commemoration of the ships sinking was attended by a representative of the German embassy to Manila. Divers laid wreaths on the wreck and then a memorial ceremony was held at the Naval Cemetery.

=== Partial list of crew members ===
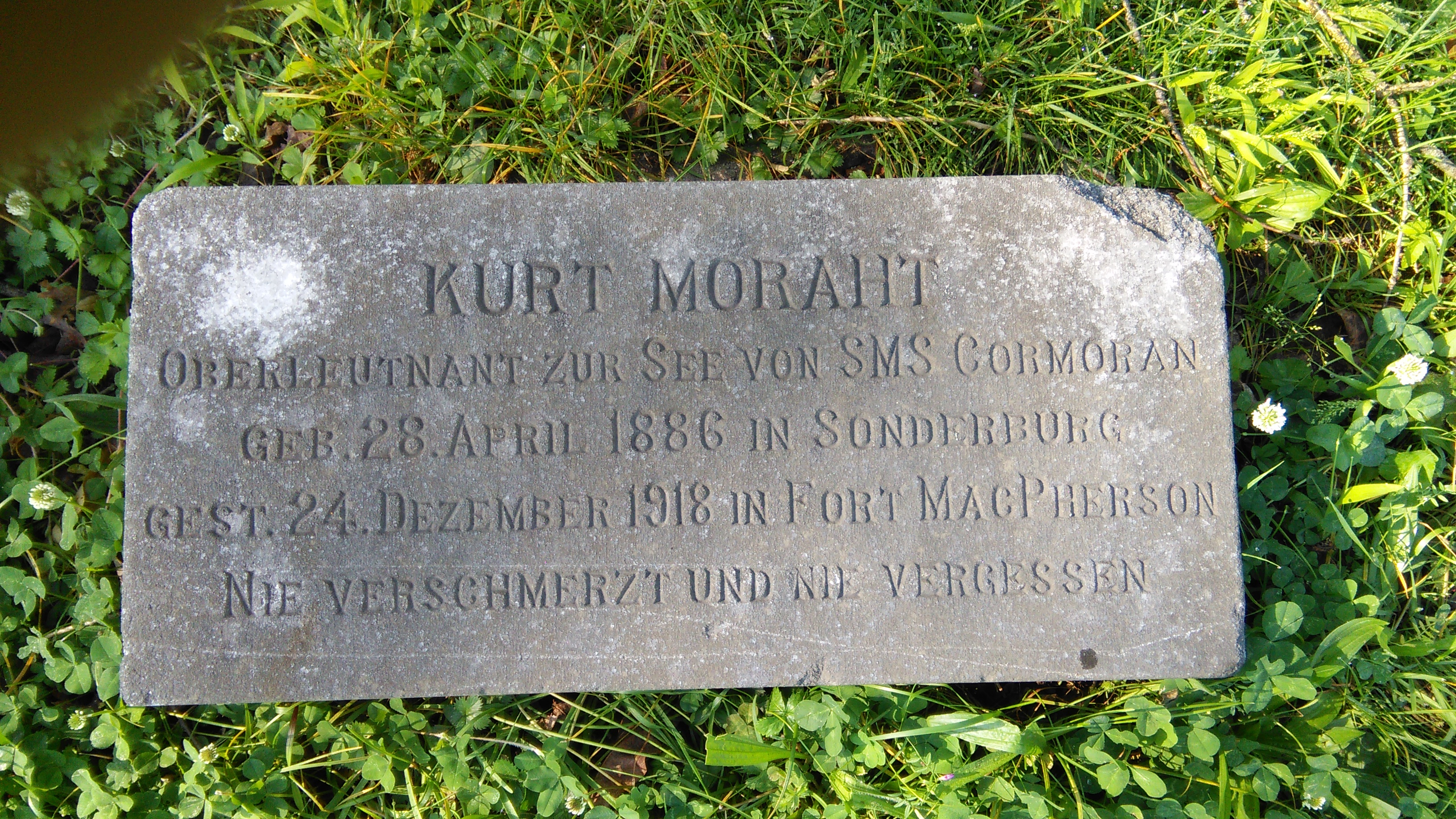

- Henry Bock (Leutnant Bock's was the first German naval officer sword surrendered in the Pacific)
- Herman Berka (Cormoran's chief engineer)
- Wilhelm Hermann Grallert, Lindenau, Kreis Landeshut, Niederschlesien, Prussia
- Fritz August Hermann Kutz, Labes, Kreis Regenwalde, Pommern, Prussia
- Jakob Runck, Landau, Pfalz, Bavaria
- Emil Bischoff, Unterschefflenz, Baden, Germany
- Ernest Max Adolf, Freiburg/Br, Germany
- Johannes Heinrich Dammann, Nutteln, Schleswig-Holstein
- Kurt Moraht

== See also ==
- Underwater diving on Guam

== Bibliography ==
- Burdick, Charles Burton (1979). The Frustrated Raider: The Story of the German Cruiser Cormoran in World War I. Carbondale: Southern Illinois University Press. ISBN 978-0-8093-0899-6. OCLC 4194620.
- Van der Vat, Dan (1984). Gentlemen of War, The Amazing Story of Captain Karl von Müller and the SMS Emden. New York: William Morrow and Company, Inc. ISBN 0-688-03115-3.
- Oelke-Farley, James (7 August 2015). "SMS Cormoran Crew List". Guampedia Foundation.
- Bartlett, Owen (1 August 1931). "Destruction of S.M.S. "Cormoran"". Proceedings. US Naval Institute.
