= Diamond Shoals =

Shoals near Cape Hatteras, North Carolina, US

Coordinates: 35.16°N 75.44°W

The Diamond Shoals are an infamous, always-shifting cluster of shallow, underwater sandbars that extend eight miles (13 km) out from Cape Hatteras, North Carolina, United States. Hidden beneath the waves and constantly changing in both form and depth, the shoals are believed to be responsible for up to 600 shipwrecks along the Cape Hatteras shoreline, an area commonly known as the "Graveyard of the Atlantic".

Diamond Shoals is composed of three distinct shoals, collectively designated as Diamond Shoals. From the shore seaward, the individual shoals and channels are:

- Hatteras Shoals
- Hatteras Slough
- Inner Diamond Shoals
- Diamond Slough
- Outer Diamond Shoals
