= Adalbert Zuckschwerdt =

- Born: January 1, 1874
- Died: July 1, 1945 (aged 71)
- Burial place: Internierungslager Staumühle
- Military career
- Allegiance: German
- Branch: Imperial German Navy
- Rank: Captain
- Commands: SMS Cormoran
- Awards: German Cross

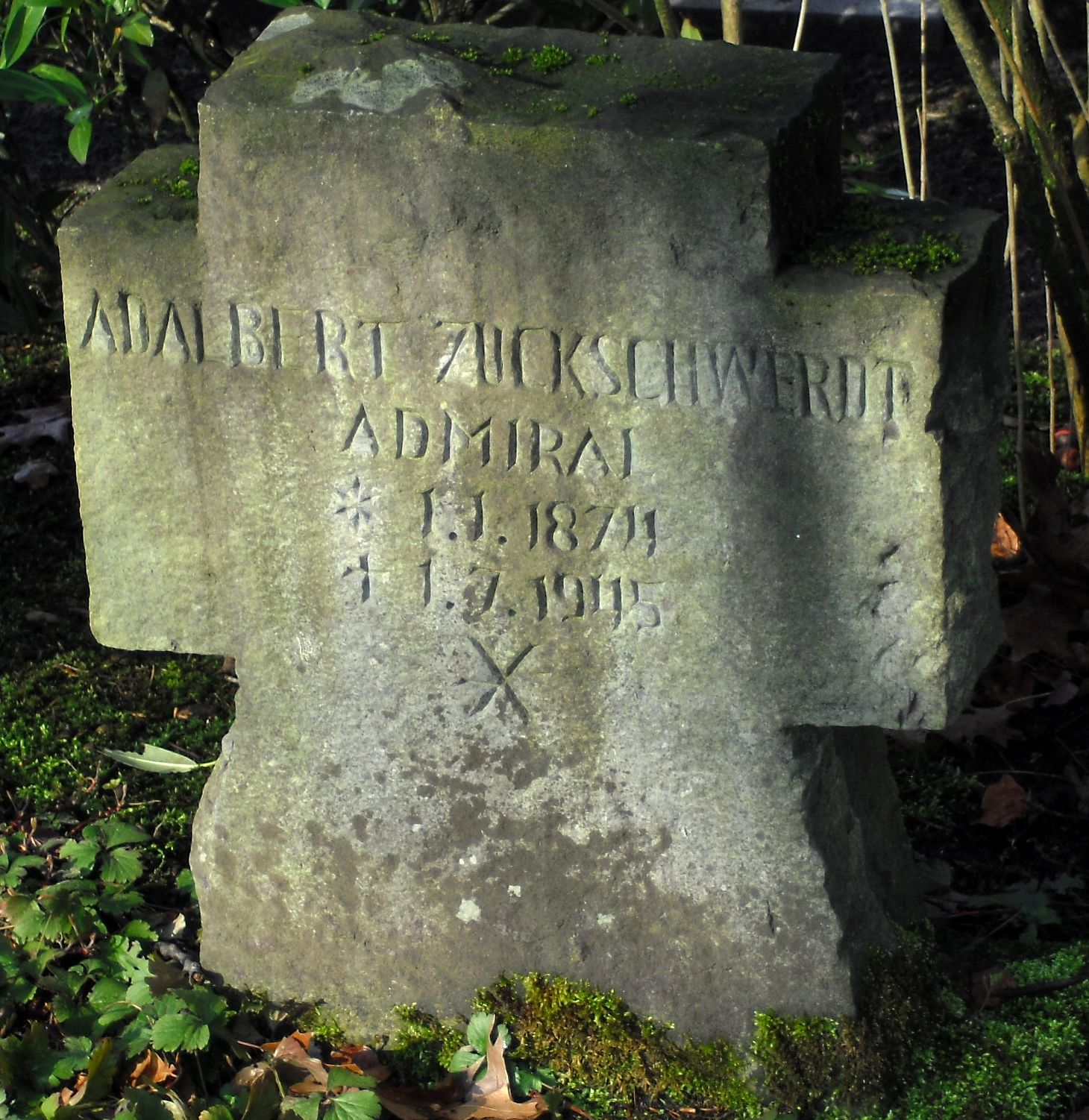
Adalbert Zuckschwerdt's grave

Adalbert Zuckschwerdt (1 January 1874 – 1 July 1945) was captain (Korvettenkapitän) of the German raider SMS Cormoran, which sailed from the German Colony of Qingdao, China, until she was finally docked and interned at Guam by the Americans. Zuckschwerdt preempted the confiscation of his ship by the Americans by igniting preplanted explosives and scuttling her in Apra Harbor. Seven of the German sailors on board died, and Zuckschwerdt spent the rest of the war as a POW.

== Career before the SMS Cormoran incident ==
Zuckschwerdt joined the Imperial German Navy on 4 April 1893 and served in different positions on land and sea. From 1902 to 1904 he served as navy officer in the German Colony Kiautschou Bay concession. Thereafter he was appointed as a gunnery officer (Artillerieoffizier) on SMS Prinz Heinrich and SMS Roon, followed by an appointment as executive officer (Erster Offizier) and as a gunnery officer (Artillerieoffizier) on SMS Hessen. On 12 February 1913 he travelled to Sydney to take the command of the gunboat SMS Cormoran. He was involved in a raid against indigenous peoples on the German-occupied Bougainville Island in February 1914 and afterwards sailed onwards to Qingdao. He arrived at the city harbour on 30 May 1914. At the beginning of World War I Zuckschwerdt's ship was decommissioned and he and his crew switched to a newly commissioned German Raider, a former civil vessel, captured by the German Cruiser SMS Emden shortly before. The new ship was also named SMS Cormoran.

== After World War I ==
Zuckschwerdt was set free in 1919 and returned to Germany, where he got promoted to the rank of Fregattenkapitän. After being shortly dismissed he joined the newly founded Reichsmarine (the German Navy in the Weimar Republic). On 19 February 1920 he received the promotion to the rank of Captain at sea (Kapitän zur See).

When German forces occupied France during World War II, Zuckschwerdt, by then in his late 60s, was appointed harbour commander of Nieuwpoort and later of Calais. On 23 February 1941 he was appointed Kommandant der Seeverteidigung (Commander of Coastal Defense) at Loire water mouth and later at Languedoc. On 1 March 1943 Zuckschwerdt was promoted to Konteradmiral. He then was appointed Admiral der französischen Südküste ("Admiral of the Coast of southern France") from 26 June to 31 August 1943 and returned to be Commander of Coastal Defense of Languedoc from 1 September 1943 to 4 April 1944. On 23 March 1944 Zuckschwerdt received the German Cross in Silver as Seekommandant Languedoc.. On 31 May 1944 Zuckschwerdt went on pension. Nevertheless, after World War II ended, he still became a POW of the US Forces operating in Garmisch-Partenkirchen on 14 May 1945. He died in July 1945, shortly after Germany's surrender to the Allies, while still being a POW. His grave lies in the area of the former British POW-camp Internierungslager Staumühle near Hövelhof.
