= 38th Guam Legislature =

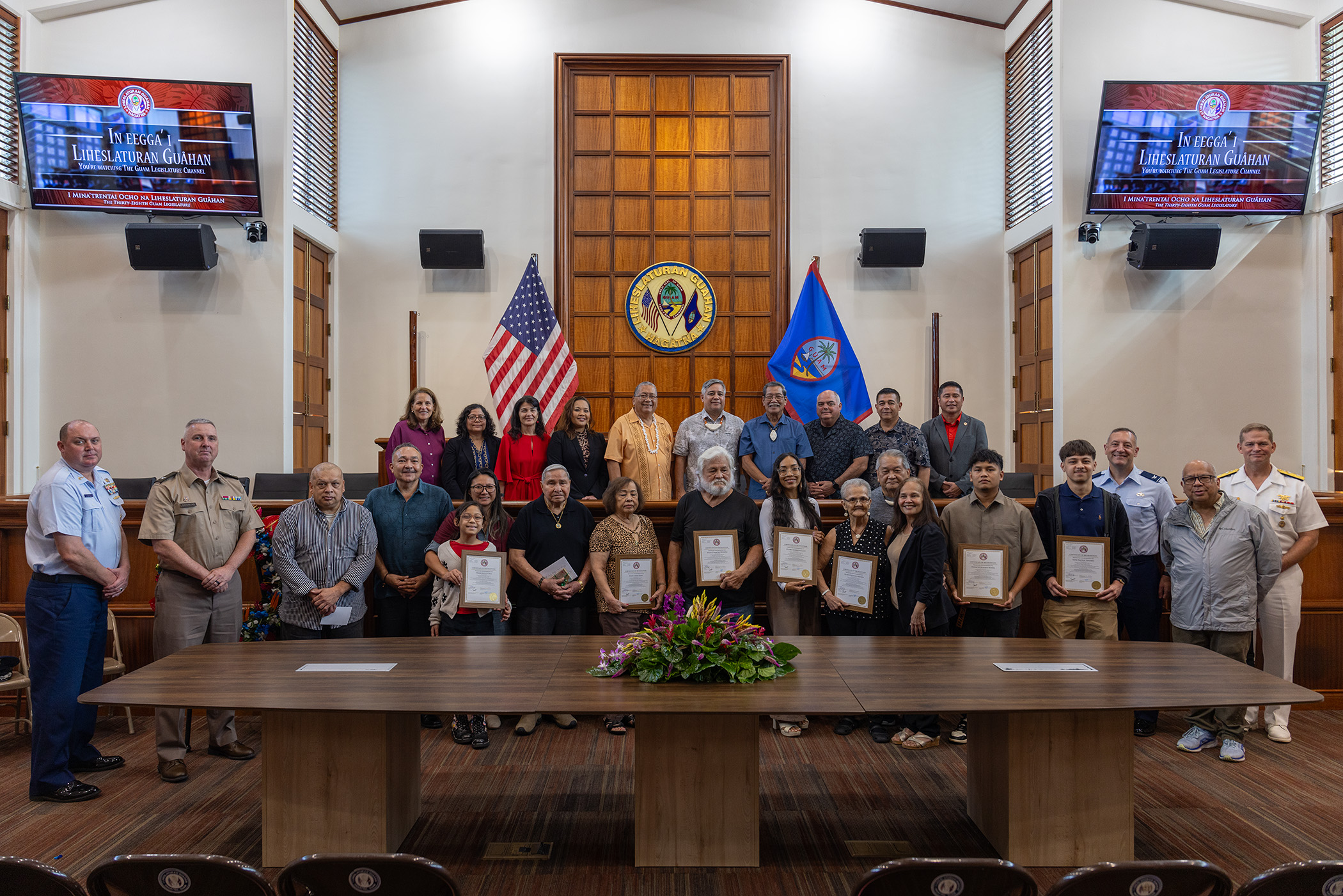
Members of the public (first row) and Guam legislators (second row) at first annual Insular Force Guard and Guam Combat Patrol Memorial at Guam Legislature

The 38th Guam Legislature is the current meeting of the Guam Legislature that convened in Hagåtña, Guam on January 6, 2025, during Lou Leon Guerrero's Governorship. In the 2024 Guam election, the Republican Party of Guam won a majority of seats in the Guam Legislature.

This is the first time that the Republican Party has held a majority in 16 years.

== Major Legislation ==
=== Enacted ===
- April 12, 2015: Act 38-3 (Bill No. 25-38): An Act to amend § 8104(a)(5)(A) and § 8104(a)(5)(B), to renumber § 8104(a)(5)(C) as § 8104(a)(5)(D); and to add a new §8104(a)(5)(C), all of Chapter 8, Title 5, Guam Code Annotated; relative to modernizing public hearing notice requirements by authorizing the posting of public notices in locally licensed electronic newspapers and websites. Act 38-4 (Bill No. 34-38): An Act to amend § 2108 of Chapter 2, Title 4, Guam Code Annotated, relative to requiring employees who resign from Government of Guam employment to submit to and pass drug testing to retain reemployment rights if” said resignation was tendered within 30 days of an announced OR random drug testing, and to require employees to submit to drug testing prior to reemployment.
- June 17, 2025: Act 38-22: An Act to amend §3101(b) of Chapter 3, Title 16 Guam Code annotated; relative to exempting non- resident active-duty service members and their dependents from Driver’s Licensing requirements. Act 38-11 (Bill No. 18-38): An Act to amend § 5707(a) of Article 12, Chapter 5, Title 5, Guam Code annonated, relative to the procedure for judicial review of decisions made by the Public Auditor in Procurement Appeals.

== Party summary ==
Affiliation	Party (shading indicates majority caucus)		Total
Affiliation	Republican	Democratic	Total
End of previous legislature	6	9	15
Begin (January 6, 2025)	9	6	15
Latest voting share	60.0%	40.0%	

== Leadership ==
=== Legislative ===
- Speaker: Frank F. Blas Jr.
- Vice Speaker: Vicente "Tony" Ada
- Legislative Secretary: Sabrina Salas Matanane

=== Majority (Republican) ===
- Majority Leader: Jesse A. Lujan
- Majority Whip: Shelly Calvo

=== Minority (Democratic) ===
- Minority Leader: Vacant
- Minority Whip: Vacant

== Membership ==
Name	Party	Start
Frank F. Blas Jr.	Republican	2017
Vicente Ada	Republican	2025
Sabrina Salas Matanane	Republican	2025
Jesse A. Lujan	Republican	2023
Christopher M. Dueñas	Republican	2021
Shelly V. Calvo	Republican	2025
Vince Borja	Republican	2025
Eulogio Gumataotao	Republican	2025
Telo T. Taitague	Republican	2019
Tina Rose Muña Barnes	Democratic	2019
Chris Barnett	Democratic	2023
William A. Parkinson	Democratic	2023
Sabina Perez	Democratic	2019
Joe S. San Agustin	Democratic	2017
Therese M. Terlaje	Democratic	2017

== Committees ==
Committee	Chair	Vice Chair
Committee on Rules	Vicente Ada	Christopher M. Duenas
Committee on Land, Environment, Housing, Agriculture, Parks, and Infrastructure	Vicente Ada	Christopher M. Duenas
Committee on Finance and Government Operations	Christopher M. Duenas	Vicente Ada
Committee on Public Safety, Emergency Management, and Guam National Guard	Eulogio Shawn Gumataotao	Vicente Ada
Committee on Education, Libraries, and Public Broadcasting	Vincent Anthony V. Borja	Tina Rose Muña Barnes
Committee on Health and Veterans Affairs	Sabrina Salas Matanane	Vicente Ada
Committee on Child Welfare, Youth Affairs, Senior Citizens, Women’s Affairs, Disability Services, the Arts, Culture, Historic Preservation, and Hagåtña Restoration	Shelly Calvo	Vicente Ada
Committee on Transportation, Tourism, Customs, Utilities, and Federal and Foreign Affairs	Jesse A. Lujan	Christopher M. Duenas & Shelly Calvo
Committee on Economic Investment, Military Buildup, Regional Relations, Technology, Regulatory Affairs, Justice, Elections, and Retirement	Telo. T. Taitague	Sabina Flores Perez
