= 2026 Guamanian legislative election =

- November 3, 2026

All 15 seats in the Legislature of Guam 8 seats needed for a majority
- Turnout: 53.11% ▲4.34pp
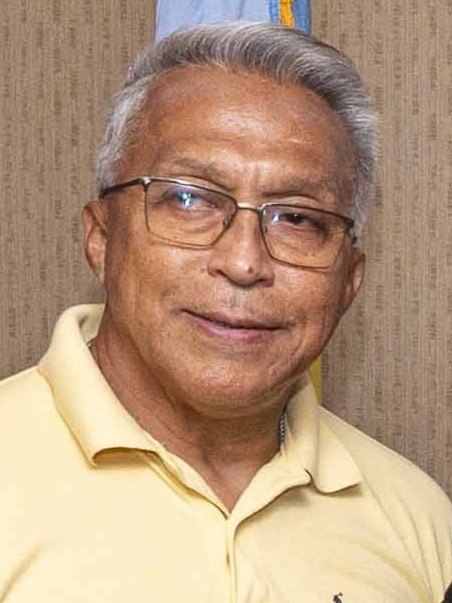

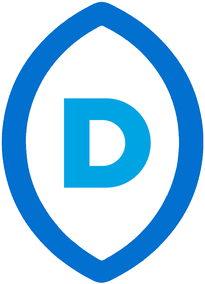
	Majority party	Minority party
Leader	Jesse A. Lujan	None appointed
Party	Republican	Democratic
Last election	53.67%, 9 seats	46.02%, 6 seats
Seats won	8	7
Seat change	▼1	▲1
Popular vote	159,808	179,660
Percentage	47.01%	52.85%
Swing	▼6.66pp	▲6.83pp
Speaker before election
Frank F. Blas Jr.
Republican
Elected Speaker
Jesse A. Lujan
Republican

The 2026 Guamanian legislative election was held on November 3, 2026, to elect the 15 members of the Legislature of Guam. The primary was held on August 1, 2026. All 15 seats were up for election.

== Republican primary ==
18 Republicans filed for election.

=== Nominee ===
- Joseph B. D. Arriola
- Louise Borja Muna, former senator
- Vince Borja (incumbent)
- Gregorio S. Calvo
- Shelly V. Calvo (incumbent)
- Wil Castro, former senator
- Christopher M. Dueñas (incumbent)
- Eulogio Shawn Gumataotao (incumbent)
- Jesse A. Lujan (incumbent)
- Matteo Mortera
- Hoa Nguyen
- Sabrina Salas Matanane (incumbent)
- Jonathan B. Savares
- Raffaele Sgambelluri
- Telo T. Taitague (incumbent)

=== Eliminated in primary ===
- Robert Benavente
- Alexander M. Duenas
- Brandon Vera

=== Declined ===
- Vicente Ada (running for governor)
- Frank F. Blas Jr. (running for governor)

=== Results ===
Republican primary official results
Party	Candidate	Votes	%
Republican	Jesse A. Lujan (incumbent)	5,662	7.50
Republican	Sabrina Salas Matanane (incumbent)	5,242	6.94
Republican	Christopher M. Dueñas (incumbent)	5,151	6.82
Republican	Shelly V. Calvo (incumbent)	4,971	6.58
Republican	Eulogio Shawn Gumataotao (incumbent)	4,840	6.41
Republican	Vince Borja (incumbent)	4,715	6.24
Republican	Telo T. Taitague (incumbent)	4,617	6.11
Republican	Raffaele M. J. Sgambelluri	4,477	5.93
Republican	Jonathan James Savares	4,446	5.88
Republican	Louise Borja Muna	4,279	5.67
Republican	Hoa Van Nugyen	4,259	5.64
Republican	William Mendiola Castro	4,202	5.56
Republican	Gregorio Salas Calvo	3,653	4.84
Republican	Matteo Thomas Montera	3,308	4.38
Republican	Joseph B. D. Arriola	3,189	4.22
Republican	Alexander Michael Duenas	3,174	4.20
Republican	Brandon Michael Vera	2,778	3.68
Republican	Robert L. G. Benavente	2,451	3.25
Write-in		112	0.15%
Total votes		74,833	100.00

== Democratic primary ==
18 Democrats filed for election.

=== Nominee ===
- Darrel Chris Barnett (incumbent)
- William A. Parkinson (incumbent)
- Fred E. Bordallo Jr., former Guam Police Department officer.
- Joaquin Cruz
- Telena Cruz Nelson, former senator
- Donna Rita Muña Quinata, businesswoman
- Kallen M.E. Perez
- Roy A.B. Quinata, former senator
- Clynton Ridgell, former senator
- Angel R. Sablan, former executive director of the Mayors' Council of Guam
- Angela T. Santos
- Amanda L. Shelton, former senator
- Anthony W. Taijeron
- Joaquin Taitague
- Sarah M. Thomas Nededog

=== Eliminated in primary ===
- David R. Duenas
- Lillian O. Guerrero
- Gerald P. Yingling

=== Declined ===
- Tina Rose Muña Barnes (running for lieutenant governor)
- Sabina Perez (running for lieutenant governor)
- Joe S. San Agustin (running for governor)
- Therese M. Terlaje (running for governor)

=== Results ===
Democratic primary official results
Party	Candidate	Votes	%
Democratic	Darrel Chris Barnett (incumbent)	9,400	8.43
Democratic	Amanda Shelton	8,500	7.62
Democratic	Telena Cruz Nelson	7,619	6.83
Democratic	Donna Rita Muña Quinata	7,136	6.40
Democratic	Clynton Ridgell	7,086	6.36
Democratic	Angel Anthony Reyes Sablan	7,000	6.27
Democratic	William A. Parkinson (incumbent)	6,883	6.17
Democratic	Roy Anthony Benavente Quinata	6,139	5.50
Democratic	Fred Eugene Bordallo Jr.	6,504	5.43
Democratic	Angela Therese A. M. Santos	6,051	5.42
Democratic	Sarah Mattie Villaranda Thomas-Nededog	5,878	5.27
Democratic	Kallen Marie E. Perez	5,773	5.17
Democratic	Anthony Wayne Cruz Taijeron	5,450	4.88
Democratic	Joaquin Manuel Paulino Taitague	5,284	4.73
Democratic	Joaquin Alan Cruz	5,105	4.58
Democratic	David Ralph Duenas	4,363	3.91
Democratic	Lillian Opeña Guerrero	4,199	3.76
Democratic	Gerald Phillip Yingling	3,440	3.08
Write-in		208	0.18%
Total votes		111,566	100.00

== General election ==
=== Results ===
2026 Guam legislative election results
Party	Candidate	Votes	%
Democratic	Darrel Christopher Barnett (incumbent)	19,783	5.82%
Democratic	Amanda Shelton	15,835	4.66%
Republican	Sabrina Salas Matanane (incumbent)	14,220	4.18%
Republican	Jesse A. Lujan (incumbent)	13,917	4.09%
Republican	Christopher M. Dueñas (incumbent)	13,746	4.04%
Democratic	Telena Cruz Nelson	13,488	3.97%
Democratic	Joaquin Manuel Paulino Taitague	13,330	3.92%
Republican	Hoa Van Nguyen	13,329	3.92%
Democratic	William A. Parkinson (incumbent)	13,120	3.86%
Democratic	Donna Rita Muña Quinata	12,670	3.73%
Democratic	Clynton Ridgell	12,595	3.70%
Republican	Vince Borja (incumbent)	12,235	3.60%
Republican	Shelly V. Calvo (incumbent)	11,428	3.36%
Democratic	Kallen Marie E. Perez	11,203	3.30%
Republican	Eulogio Gumataotao (incumbent)	11,031	3.24%
Republican	Wil Castro	10,884	3.30%
Democratic	Angel Anthony Reyes Sablan	10,764	3.17%
Republican	Jonathan James B. Savares	10,497	3.09%
Republican	Louise Borja Muna	10,458	3.08%
Democratic	Roy Anthony Benavente Quinata	10,407	3.06%
Republican	Raffaele M. Sgambelluri	10,398	3.06%
Democratic	Fred Eugene Bordallo Jr.	9,534	2.80%
Democratic	Sarah Mattie Villaranda Thomas-Nededog	9,502	2.79%
Democratic	Joaquin Alan Cruz	9,393	2.76%
Democratic	Angela Therese A.M. Santos	9,024	2.65%
Democratic	Anthony Wayne Cruz Taijeron	9,012	2.65%
Republican	Telo T. Taitague (incumbent)	8,100	2.38%
Republican	Gregorio Salas Calvo	7,194	2.12%
Republican	Matteo Thomas Mortera	7,045	2.07%
Republican	Joseph B.D. Arriola	5,326	1.57%
Write-in		503	0.15%
Total votes		339,971	100%

== See also ==
- 2026 Guam elections
