= 2024 Guamanian local elections =

- November 5, 2024
- Mayoral elections

19 mayors
	Majority party	Minority party
Party	Democratic	Republican
Mayors	12	7
Change	▲2	▼2
Votes	14,860	12,069
Percentage	54.35%	44.14%
- Map of the results Democratic hold Democratic gain Republican hold Republican gain
- Vice mayoral elections

6 vice mayors
	Majority party	Minority party
Party	Democratic	Republican
Vice mayors	3	3
Change	Steady	Steady
Votes	8,039	6,183
Percentage	51.78%	39.83%
- Map of the results Democratic hold Democratic gain Republican hold Republican gain Office disestablished since last election No such office

Mayoral elections in Guam were held on November 5, 2024 as part of the 2024 Guamanian general election, to elect mayors of nineteen villages in Guam and vice mayors in six, with primaries taking place on August 3.

The incumbent vice mayor of Sinajana, Rudy Don Iriarte, died on January 4, 2024. A special election to fill the office was planned for March 9, 2024, but was cancelled after the office was disestablished to save money.

== Summary ==
=== Mayoral elections ===
Village	Incumbent	Party	First elected	Result	General election candidates			
Agana Heights	Paul M. McDonald	Republican	1992	Incumbent retired. Democratic gain.				
Agana Heights	Paul M. McDonald	Republican	1992	Incumbent retired. Democratic gain.	Democratic	Richard B. Arroyo	617	56.81%
Agana Heights	Paul M. McDonald	Republican	1992	Incumbent retired. Democratic gain.	Republican	John Francis McDonald III	466	42.91%
Agana Heights	Paul M. McDonald	Republican	1992	Incumbent retired. Democratic gain.	Write-in		3	0.28%
Agana Heights	Paul M. McDonald	Republican	1992	Incumbent retired. Democratic gain.	Total		1,086	100.00%
Asan-Maina	Frankie A. Salas	Democratic	2016	Incumbent re-elected.				
Asan-Maina	Frankie A. Salas	Democratic	2016	Incumbent re-elected.	Democratic	Frankie A. Salas (inc.)	412	93.42%
Asan-Maina	Frankie A. Salas	Democratic	2016	Incumbent re-elected.	Write-in		29	6.58%
Asan-Maina	Frankie A. Salas	Democratic	2016	Incumbent re-elected.	Total		441	100.00%
Barrigada	June U. Blas	Democratic	2012	Incumbent re-elected.				
Barrigada	June U. Blas	Democratic	2012	Incumbent re-elected.	Democratic	June U. Blas (inc.)	1,963	99.14%
Barrigada	June U. Blas	Democratic	2012	Incumbent re-elected.	Write-in		17	0.86%
Barrigada	June U. Blas	Democratic	2012	Incumbent re-elected.	Total		1,980	100.00%
Chalan Pago-Ordot	Jessy C. Gogue	Democratic	2008	Incumbent retired. Democratic hold.				
Chalan Pago-Ordot	Jessy C. Gogue	Democratic	2008	Incumbent retired. Democratic hold.	Democratic	Wayne San Nicolas Santos	994	58.50%
Chalan Pago-Ordot	Jessy C. Gogue	Democratic	2008	Incumbent retired. Democratic hold.	Republican	Timothy Bryan Cruz Flores	701	41.26%
Chalan Pago-Ordot	Jessy C. Gogue	Democratic	2008	Incumbent retired. Democratic hold.	Write-in		4	0.24%
Chalan Pago-Ordot	Jessy C. Gogue	Democratic	2008	Incumbent retired. Democratic hold.	Total		1,699	100.00%
Dededo	Melissa B. Savares	Democratic	2004	Incumbent retired. Democratic hold.				
Dededo	Melissa B. Savares	Democratic	2004	Incumbent retired. Democratic hold.	Democratic	Peter John Benavente	4,036	68.14%
Dededo	Melissa B. Savares	Democratic	2004	Incumbent retired. Democratic hold.	Republican	Elana Peredo Garcia	1,848	31.20%
Dededo	Melissa B. Savares	Democratic	2004	Incumbent retired. Democratic hold.	Write-in		39	0.66%
Dededo	Melissa B. Savares	Democratic	2004	Incumbent retired. Democratic hold.	Total		5,923	100.00%
Hågat	Kevin J. T. Susuico	Republican	2016	Incumbent re-elected.				
Hågat	Kevin J. T. Susuico	Republican	2016	Incumbent re-elected.	Republican	Kevin J. T. Susuico (inc.)	934	75.26%
Hågat	Kevin J. T. Susuico	Republican	2016	Incumbent re-elected.	Democratic	Mark Campos Charfauros	299	24.09%
Hågat	Kevin J. T. Susuico	Republican	2016	Incumbent re-elected.	Write-in		8	0.64%
Hågat	Kevin J. T. Susuico	Republican	2016	Incumbent re-elected.	Total		1,241	100.00%
Hagåtña	Michael Thomas Cruz Gumataotao	Republican	2004	Incumbent retired. Republican hold.				
Hagåtña	Michael Thomas Cruz Gumataotao	Republican	2004	Incumbent retired. Republican hold.	Republican	Michael Thomas Cruz Gumataotao	147	66.82%
Hagåtña	Michael Thomas Cruz Gumataotao	Republican	2004	Incumbent retired. Republican hold.	Write-in		73	33.18%
Hagåtña	Michael Thomas Cruz Gumataotao	Republican	2004	Incumbent retired. Republican hold.	Total		220	100.00%
Humåtak	Johnny A. Quinata	Republican	2012	Incumbent re-elected.				
Humåtak	Johnny A. Quinata	Republican	2012	Incumbent re-elected.	Republican	Johnny A. Quinata (inc.)	239	72.42%
Humåtak	Johnny A. Quinata	Republican	2012	Incumbent re-elected.	Democratic	Gilbert Q. Aguon	91	27.58%
Humåtak	Johnny A. Quinata	Republican	2012	Incumbent re-elected.	Write-in		0	0.00%
Humåtak	Johnny A. Quinata	Republican	2012	Incumbent re-elected.	Total		330	100.00%
Inalåhan	Anthony P. Chargualaf Jr.	Democratic	2020	Incumbent re-elected.				
Inalåhan	Anthony P. Chargualaf Jr.	Democratic	2020	Incumbent re-elected.	Democratic	Anthony P. Chargualaf Jr. (inc.)	841	99.06%
Inalåhan	Anthony P. Chargualaf Jr.	Democratic	2020	Incumbent re-elected.	Write-in		8	0.94%
Inalåhan	Anthony P. Chargualaf Jr.	Democratic	2020	Incumbent re-elected.	Total		849	100.00%
Malesso'	Ernest T. Chargualaf	Republican	2008	Incumbent retired. Republican hold.				
Malesso'	Ernest T. Chargualaf	Republican	2008	Incumbent retired. Republican hold.	Republican	Franklin John Quidachay Champaco	274	99.64%
Malesso'	Ernest T. Chargualaf	Republican	2008	Incumbent retired. Republican hold.	Write-in		1	0.36%
Malesso'	Ernest T. Chargualaf	Republican	2008	Incumbent retired. Republican hold.	Total		275	100.00%
Mangilao	Allan R. G. Ungacta	Republican	2016	Incumbent re-elected.				
Mangilao	Allan R. G. Ungacta	Republican	2016	Incumbent re-elected.	Republican	Allan R. G. Ungacta (inc.)	2,366	99.50%
Mangilao	Allan R. G. Ungacta	Republican	2016	Incumbent re-elected.	Write-in		12	0.50%
Mangilao	Allan R. G. Ungacta	Republican	2016	Incumbent re-elected.	Total		2,378	100.00%
Mongmong-Toto-Maite	Rudy A. Paco	Democratic	2016	Incumbent re-elected.				
Mongmong-Toto-Maite	Rudy A. Paco	Democratic	2016	Incumbent re-elected.	Democratic	Rudy A. Paco (inc.)	1,056	97.78%
Mongmong-Toto-Maite	Rudy A. Paco	Democratic	2016	Incumbent re-elected.	Write-in		24	2.22%
Mongmong-Toto-Maite	Rudy A. Paco	Democratic	2016	Incumbent re-elected.	Total		1,080	100.00%
Piti	Jesse L. G. Alig	Republican	2016	Incumbent re-elected.				
Piti	Jesse L. G. Alig	Republican	2016	Incumbent re-elected.	Republican	Jesse L. G. Alig (inc.)	478	98.56%
Piti	Jesse L. G. Alig	Republican	2016	Incumbent re-elected.	Write-in		7	1.44%
Piti	Jesse L. G. Alig	Republican	2016	Incumbent re-elected.	Total		485	100.00%
Sånta Rita-Sumai	Dale E. Alvarez	Democratic	2008	Incumbent retired. Democratic hold.				
Sånta Rita-Sumai	Dale E. Alvarez	Democratic	2008	Incumbent retired. Democratic hold.	Democratic	Dale "Jr." C. Alvarez	326	51.58%
Sånta Rita-Sumai	Dale E. Alvarez	Democratic	2008	Incumbent retired. Democratic hold.	Republican	JanaLua Lizama Salvador	305	48.26%
Sånta Rita-Sumai	Dale E. Alvarez	Democratic	2008	Incumbent retired. Democratic hold.	Write-in		1	0.16%
Sånta Rita-Sumai	Dale E. Alvarez	Democratic	2008	Incumbent retired. Democratic hold.	Total		632	100.00%
Sinajana	Robert R. D. C. Hofmann	Democratic	2012	Incumbent re-elected.				
Sinajana	Robert R. D. C. Hofmann	Democratic	2012	Incumbent re-elected.	Democratic	Robert R. D. C. Hofmann (inc.)	906	98.05%
Sinajana	Robert R. D. C. Hofmann	Democratic	2012	Incumbent re-elected.	Write-in		18	1.95%
Sinajana	Robert R. D. C. Hofmann	Democratic	2012	Incumbent re-elected.	Total		924	100.00%
Talo'fo'fo	Vicente S. Taitague	Democratic	1996 (Note: Non-consecutive, serving current term since 2008)	Incumbent re-elected.				
Talo'fo'fo	Vicente S. Taitague	Democratic	1996	Incumbent re-elected.	Democratic	Vicente S. Taitague (inc.)	821	95.13%
Talo'fo'fo	Vicente S. Taitague	Democratic	1996	Incumbent re-elected.	Write-in		42	4.87%
Talo'fo'fo	Vicente S. Taitague	Democratic	1996	Incumbent re-elected.	Total		863	100.00%
Tamuning	Louise Cruz Rivera	Republican	2012	Incumbent re-elected.				
Tamuning	Louise Cruz Rivera	Republican	2012	Incumbent re-elected.	Republican	Louise Cruz Rivera (inc.)	1,983	98.80%
Tamuning	Louise Cruz Rivera	Republican	2012	Incumbent re-elected.	Write-in		24	1.20%
Tamuning	Louise Cruz Rivera	Republican	2012	Incumbent re-elected.	Total		2,007	100.00%
Yigo	Tony P. Sanchez	Republican	2020	Incumbent lost re-election. Democratic gain.				
Yigo	Tony P. Sanchez	Republican	2020	Incumbent lost re-election. Democratic gain.	Democratic	Frances S. Lizama	1,934	60.70%
Yigo	Tony P. Sanchez	Republican	2020	Incumbent lost re-election. Democratic gain.	Republican	Tony P. Sanchez (inc.)	1,223	38.39%
Yigo	Tony P. Sanchez	Republican	2020	Incumbent lost re-election. Democratic gain.	Write-in		29	0.91%
Yigo	Tony P. Sanchez	Republican	2020	Incumbent lost re-election. Democratic gain.	Total		3,186	100.00%
Yona	Bill Aguon Quenga	Democratic	2020 (special)	Incumbent lost primary. Democratic hold.				
Yona	Bill Aguon Quenga	Democratic	2020 (special)	Incumbent lost primary. Democratic hold.	Democratic	Brian Jess Terlaje	1,001	57.46%
Yona	Bill Aguon Quenga	Democratic	2020 (special)	Incumbent lost primary. Democratic hold.	Republican	Debbie Perido Lujan	668	38.35%
Yona	Bill Aguon Quenga	Democratic	2020 (special)	Incumbent lost primary. Democratic hold.	Write-in		73	4.19%
Yona	Bill Aguon Quenga	Democratic	2020 (special)	Incumbent lost primary. Democratic hold.	Total		1,742	100.00%
Source: Guam Electoral Commission

=== Vice mayoral elections ===
Village	Incumbent	Party	First elected	Result	General election			
Barrigada	Jessie P. Bautista	Democratic	2012	Incumbent re-elected.				
Barrigada	Jessie P. Bautista	Democratic	2012	Incumbent re-elected.	Democratic	Jessie P. Bautista (inc.)	1,945	99.34%
Barrigada	Jessie P. Bautista	Democratic	2012	Incumbent re-elected.	Write-in		13	0.66%
Barrigada	Jessie P. Bautista	Democratic	2012	Incumbent re-elected.	Total		1,958	100.00%
Dededo	Peter J. S. Benavente	Democratic	2020	Incumbent retired. Democratic hold.				
Dededo	Peter J. S. Benavente	Democratic	2020	Incumbent retired. Democratic hold.	Democratic	Ann S. San Agustin Leon Guerrero	3,607	63.37%
Dededo	Peter J. S. Benavente	Democratic	2020	Incumbent retired. Democratic hold.	Republican	Rene Espina Helit	1,561	27.42%
Dededo	Peter J. S. Benavente	Democratic	2020	Incumbent retired. Democratic hold.	Write-in		524	9.21%
Dededo	Peter J. S. Benavente	Democratic	2020	Incumbent retired. Democratic hold.	Total		5,692	100.00%
Hågat	Christopher J. Fejeran	Republican	2016	Incumbent re-elected.				
Hågat	Christopher J. Fejeran	Republican	2016	Incumbent re-elected.	Republican	Christopher J. Fejeran (inc.)	782	62.96%
Hågat	Christopher J. Fejeran	Republican	2016	Incumbent re-elected.	Democratic	Reuben Manuel Santos Herrera	458	36.88%
Hågat	Christopher J. Fejeran	Republican	2016	Incumbent re-elected.	Write-in		2	0.16%
Hågat	Christopher J. Fejeran	Republican	2016	Incumbent re-elected.	Total		1,242	100.00%
Mangilao	Kevin A. N. Delgado	Democratic	2020	Incumbent retired. Republican gain.				
Mangilao	Kevin A. N. Delgado	Democratic	2020	Incumbent retired. Republican gain.	Republican	Edward J. D. Tosco	2,104	98.27%
Mangilao	Kevin A. N. Delgado	Democratic	2020	Incumbent retired. Republican gain.	Write-in		37	1.73%
Mangilao	Kevin A. N. Delgado	Democratic	2020	Incumbent retired. Republican gain.	Total		2,141	100.00%
Tamuning	Albert M. Toves	Republican	2020	Incumbent re-elected.				
Tamuning	Albert M. Toves	Republican	2020	Incumbent re-elected.	Republican	Albert M. Toves (inc.)	1,736	93.28%
Tamuning	Albert M. Toves	Republican	2020	Incumbent re-elected.	Write-in		125	6.72%
Tamuning	Albert M. Toves	Republican	2020	Incumbent re-elected.	Total		1,861	100.00%
Yigo	Loreto V. Leones	Republican	2020	Incumbent retired. Democratic gain.				
Yigo	Loreto V. Leones	Republican	2020	Incumbent retired. Democratic gain.	Democratic	Pedro Suzuki Blas	2,029	77.15%
Yigo	Loreto V. Leones	Republican	2020	Incumbent retired. Democratic gain.	Write-in		601	22.85%
Yigo	Loreto V. Leones	Republican	2020	Incumbent retired. Democratic gain.	Total		2,630	100.00%

== Detailed results ==
=== Agana Heights ===
Agana Heights mayoral Democratic primary results
Party	Candidate	Votes	%
Democratic	Richard B. Arroyo	444	67.37%
Democratic	Kevin Caparoso Masnayon	210	31.87%
Write-in		5	0.76%
Total votes		659	100.00%

Agana Heights mayoral Republican primary results
Party	Candidate	Votes	%
Republican	John Francis III McDonald	170	96.59%
Write-in		6	3.41%
Total votes		176	100.00%

=== Asan-Maina ===
Asan-Maina mayoral Democratic primary results
Party	Candidate	Votes	%
Democratic	Frankie A. Salas (inc.)	201	68.60%
Democratic	Leslie V. San Nicolas	91	31.06%
Write-in		1	0.34%
Total votes		293	100.00%

Asan-Maina mayoral Republican primary results
Party	Candidate	Votes	%
Write-in	Frankie A. Salas (inc.)	4	40.00%
Write-in		6	60.00%
Total votes		10	100.00%

=== Barrigada ===
==== Mayoral ====
Barrigada mayoral Democratic primary results
Party	Candidate	Votes	%
Democratic	June U. Blas (inc.)	899	99.56%
Write-in		4	0.44%
Total votes		903	100.00%

Barrigada mayoral Republican primary results
Party	Candidate	Votes	%
Write-in	June U. Blas (inc.)	13	48.15%
Write-in		14	51.85%
Total votes		10	100.00%

==== Vice mayoral ====
Barrigada vice mayoral Democratic primary results
Party	Candidate	Votes	%
Democratic	Jessie P. Bautista (inc.)	869	99.66%
Write-in		3	0.34%
Total votes		872	100.00%

Barrigada vice mayoral Republican primary results
Party	Candidate	Votes	%
Write-in	Jessie P. Bautista (inc.)	8	50.00%
Write-in		8	50.00%
Total votes		16	100.00%

=== Chalan Pago-Ordot ===
Chalan Pago-Ordot mayoral Democratic primary results
Party	Candidate	Votes	%
Democratic	Wayne San Nicolas Santos	646	97.29%
Write-in		18	2.71%
Valid ballots		664	82.48%
Invalid or blank votes		141	17.52%
Total votes		805	100.00%

Chalan Pago-Ordot mayoral Republican primary results
Party	Candidate	Votes	%
Republican	Timothy Bryan Cruz Flores	230	96.64%
Write-in		8	3.36%
Valid ballots		238	78.55%
Invalid or blank votes		65	21.45%
Total votes		303	100.00%

=== Dededo ===
==== Mayoral ====
Dededo mayoral Democratic primary results
Party	Candidate	Votes	%
Democratic	Peter John Benavente	2,145	99.03%
Write-in		21	0.97%
Valid ballots		2,166	88.77%
Invalid or blank votes		274	11.23%
Total votes		2,440	100.00%

Dededo mayoral Republican primary results
Party	Candidate	Votes	%
Republican	Elana Peredo Garcia	487	98.19%
Write-in		9	1.81%
Valid ballots		496	75.61%
Invalid or blank votes		160	24.39%
Total votes		656	100.00%

==== Vice mayoral ====
Dededo vice mayoral Democratic primary results
Party	Candidate	Votes	%
Democratic	Ann S. San Agustin Leon Guerrero	1,111	50.39%
Democratic	Samnak San Agustin Obina	1,091	49.48%
Write-in		3	0.14%
Valid ballots		2,205	90.37%
Invalid or blank votes		235	9.63%
Total votes		2,440	100.00%

Dededo vice mayoral Republican primary results
Party	Candidate	Votes	%
Republican	Rene Espina Helit	420	98.59%
Write-in		6	1.41%
Valid ballots		426	64.94%
Invalid or blank votes		230	35.06%
Total votes		656	100.00%

=== Hågat ===
==== Mayoral ====
Hågat mayoral Democratic primary results
Party	Candidate	Votes	%
Democratic	Mark Campos Charfauros	178	89.90%
Write-in		20	10.10%
Valid ballots		198	50.38%
Invalid or blank votes		195	49.62%
Total votes		393	100.00%

Hågat mayoral Republican primary results
Party	Candidate	Votes	%
Republican	Kevin J.T. Susuico (inc.)	336	71.34%
Republican	Raymond Joseph Arceo	135	28.66%
Write-in		0	0.00%
Valid ballots		471	98.74%
Invalid or blank votes		6	1.26%
Total votes		477	100.00%

==== Vice mayoral ====
Hågat vice mayoral Democratic primary results
Party	Candidate	Votes	%
Democratic	Reuben Manuel Santos Herrera	248	96.50%
Write-in		9	3.50%
Valid ballots		257	65.39%
Invalid or blank votes		136	34.61%
Total votes		393	100.00%

Hågat vice mayoral Republican primary results
Party	Candidate	Votes	%
Republican	Christopher J. Fejeran (inc.)	395	99.25%
Write-in		3	0.75%
Valid ballots		398	83.44%
Invalid or blank votes		79	16.56%
Total votes		477	100.00%

=== Hagåtña ===
Hagåtña mayoral Democratic primary results
Party	Candidate	Votes	%
Democratic	Michael Thomas Cruz Gumataotao (write-in)	3	100.00%
Write-in		0	0.00%
Valid ballots		3	8.57%
Invalid or blank votes		32	91.43%
Total votes		35	100.00%

Hagåtña mayoral Republican primary results
Party	Candidate	Votes	%
Republican	Michael Thomas Cruz Gumataotao	95	61.29%
Republican	Jovyna Limtiaco San Agustin	60	38.71%
Write-in		0	0.00%
Valid ballots		155	98.73%
Invalid or blank votes		2	1.27%
Total votes		157	100.00%

=== Humåtak ===
Humåtak mayoral Democratic primary results
Party	Candidate	Votes	%
Democratic	Gilbert Q. Aguon	63	95.45%
Write-in		3	4.55%
Valid ballots		66	75.00%
Invalid or blank votes		22	25.00%
Total votes		88	100.00%

Humåtak mayoral Republican primary results
Party	Candidate	Votes	%
Republican	Johnny A. Quinata (inc.)	151	61.29%
Write-in		0	0.00%
Valid ballots		151	99.34%
Invalid or blank votes		1	0.66%
Total votes		152	100.00%

=== Inalåhan ===
Inalåhan mayoral Democratic primary results
Party	Candidate	Votes	%
Democratic	Anthony P. Chargualaf Jr. (inc.)	462	98.51%
Write-in		7	1.49%
Valid ballots		469	93.06%
Invalid or blank votes		35	6.94%
Total votes		504	100.00%

Inalåhan mayoral Republican primary results
Party	Candidate	Votes	%
	Write-in	3	100.00%
Valid ballots		3	4.23%
Invalid or blank votes		68	95.77%
Total votes		71	100.00%

=== Malesso' ===
Malesso' mayoral Democratic primary results
Party	Candidate	Votes	%
Democratic	Franklin John Quidachay Champaco	427	68.65%
Democratic	Stephen Michael Cruz	195	31.35%
Write-in		0	0.00%
Valid ballots		622	99.36%
Invalid or blank votes		4	0.64%
Total votes		626	100.00%

Malesso' mayoral Republican primary results
Party	Candidate	Votes	%
	Write-in	0	0.00%
Valid ballots		0	0.00%
Invalid or blank votes		8	100.00%
Total votes		8	100.00%

=== Mangilao ===
==== Mayoral ====
Mangilao mayoral Democratic primary results
Party	Candidate	Votes	%
Write-in	Allan R.G. Ungacta (inc.)	48	51.06%
Write-in		46	48.94%
Valid ballots		94	10.13%
Invalid or blank votes		834	89.87%
Total votes		928	100.00%

Mangilao mayoral Republican primary results
Party	Candidate	Votes	%
Republican	Allan R.G. Ungacta (inc.)	459	99.78%
Write-in		1	0.22%
Valid ballots		460	93.31%
Invalid or blank votes		33	6.69%
Total votes		493	100.00%

==== Vice mayoral ====
Mangilao vice mayoral Democratic primary results
Party	Candidate	Votes	%
Write-in	Kevin A.N. Delgado (inc.)	23	31.94%
Democratic	Edward J.D. Tosco (write-in)	16	22.22%
Write-in		33	45.83%
Valid ballots		72	7.76%
Invalid or blank votes		856	92.24%
Total votes		928	100.00%

Mangilao vice mayoral Republican primary results
Party	Candidate	Votes	%
Republican	Edward J.D. Tosco	368	97.10%
Write-in		11	2.90%
Valid ballots		379	76.88%
Invalid or blank votes		114	23.12%
Total votes		493	100.00%

=== Mongmong-Toto-Maite ===
Mongmong-Toto-Maite mayoral Democratic primary results
Party	Candidate	Votes	%
Democratic	Rudy A. Paco (inc.)	480	98.56%
Write-in		7	1.44%
Valid ballots		487	93.83%
Invalid or blank votes		32	6.17%
Total votes		519	100.00%

Mongmong-Toto-Maite mayoral Republican primary results
Party	Candidate	Votes	%
Write-in	Rudy A. Paco (inc.)	6	40.00%
Write-in		9	60.00%
Valid ballots		15	8.82%
Invalid or blank votes		155	91.18%
Total votes		170	100.00%

=== Piti ===
Piti mayoral Democratic primary results
Party	Candidate	Votes	%
Write-in	Jesse L.G. Alig (inc.)	8	61.54%
Write-in		5	38.46%
Valid ballots		13	6.34%
Invalid or blank votes		192	93.66%
Total votes		205	100.00%

Piti mayoral Republican primary results
Party	Candidate	Votes	%
Republican	Jesse L.G. Alig (inc.)	126	99.21%
Write-in		1	0.79%
Valid ballots		127	93.38%
Invalid or blank votes		9	6.62%
Total votes		136	100.00%

=== Sånta Rita-Sumai ===
Sånta Rita-Sumai mayoral Democratic primary results
Party	Candidate	Votes	%
Democratic	Dale "Jr." C. Alvarez	345	46.25%
Democratic	Anthony San Nicolas Jr.	213	28.55%
Democratic	Leon Guerrero Jr.	187	25.07%
Write-in		1	0.13%
Valid ballots		746	98.81%
Invalid or blank votes		9	1.19%
Total votes		755	100.00%

Sånta Rita-Sumai mayoral Republican primary results
Party	Candidate	Votes	%
Republican	JanaLu Lizama Salvador	114	100.00%
Write-in		0	0.00%
Valid ballots		114	78.62%
Invalid or blank votes		31	21.38%
Total votes		145	100.00%

=== Sinajana ===
Sinajana mayoral Democratic primary results
Party	Candidate	Votes	%
Democratic	Robert R.D.C. Hofmann (inc.)	465	97.28%
Write-in		13	2.72%
Valid ballots		478	92.28%
Invalid or blank votes		40	7.72%
Total votes		518	100.00%

Sinajana mayoral Republican primary results
Party	Candidate	Votes	%
Write-in	Robert R.D.C. Hofmann (inc.)	4	33.33%
Write-in		8	66.67%
Valid ballots		12	15.38%
Invalid or blank votes		121	84.62%
Total votes		143	100.00%

=== Talo'fo'fo ===
Talo'fo'fo mayoral Democratic primary results
Party	Candidate	Votes	%
Democratic	Vicente S. Taitague (inc.)	448	96.34%
Write-in		17	3.66%
Valid ballots		465	86.92%
Invalid or blank votes		70	13.08%
Total votes		535	100.00%

Talo'fo'fo mayoral Republican primary results
Party	Candidate	Votes	%
Write-in	Vicente S. Taitague (inc.)	2	8.33%
Write-in	Tommy Diego	2	8.33%
Write-in	Ireno Borja	2	8.33%
Write-in		6	50.00%
Valid ballots		12	8.89%
Invalid or blank votes		123	91.11%
Total votes		135	100.00%

=== Tamuning ===
==== Mayoral ====
Tamuning mayoral Democratic primary results
Party	Candidate	Votes	%
Write-in	Louise Cruz Rivera (inc.)	24	96.34%
Write-in		39	61.91%
Valid ballots		63	8.17%
Invalid or blank votes		708	91.83%
Total votes		771	100.00%

Tamuning mayoral Republican primary results
Party	Candidate	Votes	%
Republican	Louise Cruz Rivera (inc.)	429	98.62%
Write-in		6	1.38%
Valid ballots		435	89.14%
Invalid or blank votes		53	10.86%
Total votes		488	100.00%

==== Vice mayoral ====
Tamuning vice mayoral Democratic primary results
Party	Candidate	Votes	%
Write-in	Albert M. Toves (inc.)	9	25.00%
Write-in	Delbert Diaz Calvo	4	11.11%
Write-in		23	63.89%
Valid ballots		36	4.67%
Invalid or blank votes		735	95.33%
Total votes		771	100.00%

Tamuning vice mayoral Republican primary results
Party	Candidate	Votes	%
Republican	Albert M. Toves (inc.)	240	54.79%
Republican	Delbert Diaz Calvo	197	44.98%
Write-in		1	0.23%
Valid ballots		438	89.75%
Invalid or blank votes		50	10.25%
Total votes		488	100.00%

=== Yigo ===
==== Mayoral ====
Yigo mayoral Democratic primary results
Party	Candidate	Votes	%
Democratic	Frances S. Lizama	1,062	98.33%
Write-in		18	1.67%
Valid ballots		1,080	83.46%
Invalid or blank votes		214	16.54%
Total votes		1,294	100.00%

Yigo mayoral Republican primary results
Party	Candidate	Votes	%
Republican	Tony P. Sanchez (inc.)	400	98.28%
Write-in		7	1.72%
Valid ballots		407	84.09%
Invalid or blank votes		77	15.91%
Total votes		484	100.00%

==== Vice mayoral ====
Yigo vice mayoral Democratic primary results
Party	Candidate	Votes	%
Democratic	Pedro Suzuki Blas	927	97.27%
Write-in		26	2.73%
Valid ballots		953	73.65%
Invalid or blank votes		341	26.35%
Total votes		1,294	100.00%

Yigo vice mayoral Republican primary results
Party	Candidate	Votes	%
Write-in	Loreto V. Leones (not running, inc.)	56	73.73%
Write-in		21	27.27%
Valid ballots		77	15.91%
Invalid or blank votes		407	84.09%
Total votes		484	100.00%

=== Yona ===
Yona mayoral Democratic primary results
Party	Candidate	Votes	%
Democratic	Brian Jess Terlaje	575	65.12%
Democratic	Bill Aguon Quenga (inc.)	298	33.75%
Write-in		10	1.13%
Valid ballots		883	97.38%
Invalid or blank votes		24	2.62%
Total votes		917	100.00%

Yona mayoral Republican primary results
Party	Candidate	Votes	%
Republican	Debbie Peredo Lujan	231	73.10%
Republican	Franklin E. Hiton	84	26.58%
Write-in		1	0.32%
Valid ballots		316	93.21%
Invalid or blank votes		23	6.79%
Total votes		339	100.00%

== See also ==
- 2024 Guamanian legislative election
- 2024 United States House of Representatives election in Guam
- 2024 United States presidential straw poll in Guam
