= 2026 United States House of Representatives election in Guam =

- November 3, 2026
- Turnout: 53.1%
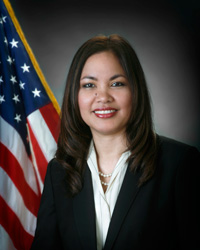

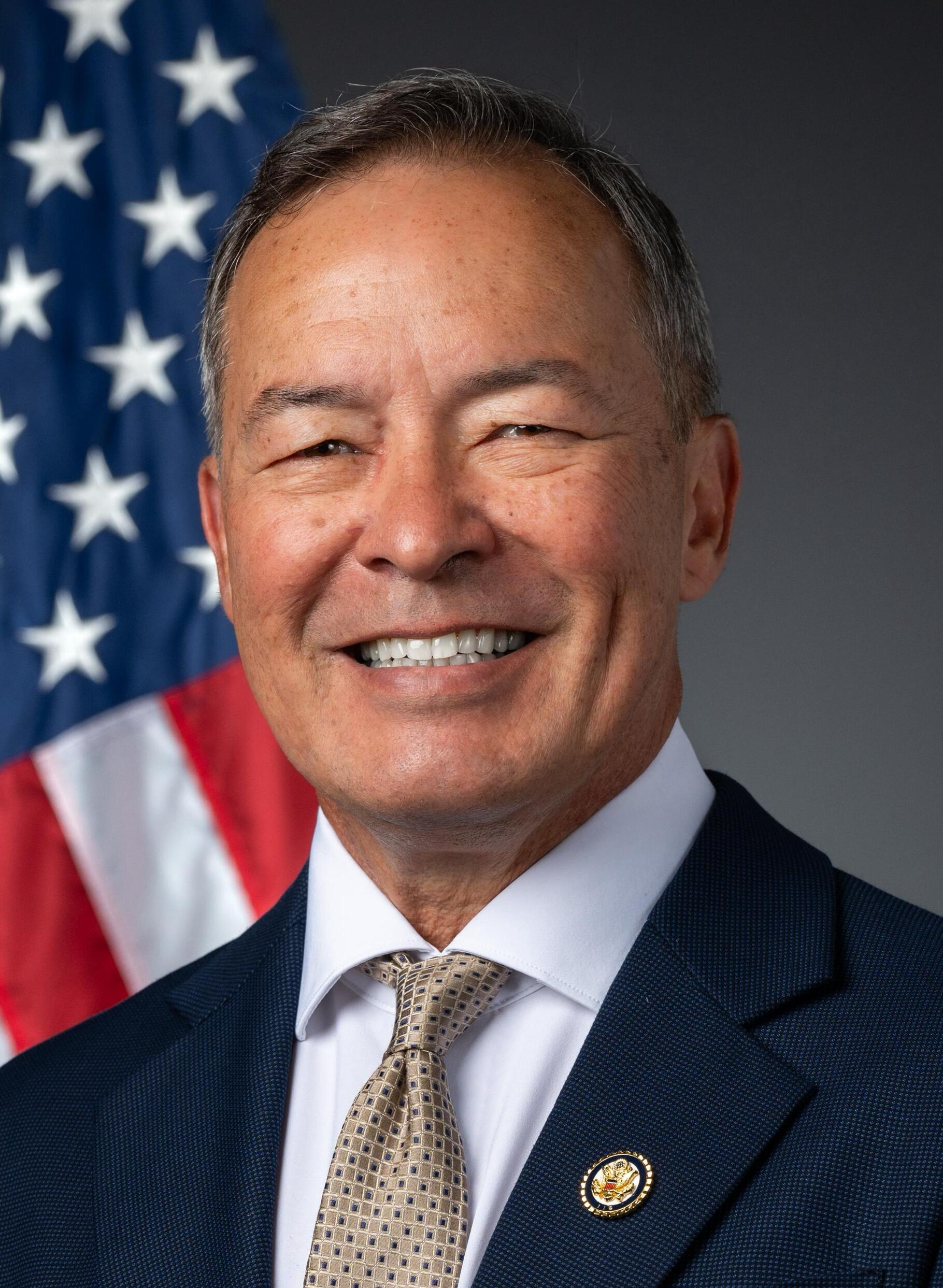
Nominee	Alicia Limtiaco	James Moylan
Party	Democratic	Republican
Popular vote	15,645	14,983
Percentage	51.00%	48.84%
- Results by village Limtiaco: 50–60% 60–70% Moylan: 50–60%
Delegate before election
James Moylan
Republican
Elected delegate
Alicia Limtiaco
Democratic

The 2026 United States House of Representatives election in Guam was held on November 3, 2026, to elect the territory's non-voting delegate to the United States House of Representatives. The delegate, who is elected to a two-year term, represents Guam's at-large congressional district in the U.S. House of Representatives. The election will coincide with the larger 2026 United States House of Representatives elections and the 2026 Guam general election. Primary elections were held on August 1, 2026.

Incumbent Republican delegate James Moylan was re-elected to his second term in 2024 with 52.69% of the vote; he was defeated in this election by Democratic challenger Alicia Limtiaco.

== Background ==
Incumbent Moylan was first elected in 2022, becoming the first Republican delegate elected since 1993. In 2024, he defeated Democratic nominee Ginger Cruz, 52.69% to 46.81% of the vote. Moylan is also one of two Chamorro serving in the U.S. House of Representatives, with Kimberlyn King-Hinds of the Northern Mariana Islands.

== Republican primary ==
=== Candidates ===
==== Nominee ====
- James Moylan, incumbent U.S. delegate (2023–present)

==== Eliminated in primary ====
- Mary Camacho Torres, former senator of the Guam Legislature (2015–2023)

=== Fundraising ===
Campaign finance reports as of June 30, 2026
Candidate	Raised	Spent	Cash on hand
James Moylan (R)	$151,158	$128,911	$26,271
Source: Federal Election Commission

=== Results ===
Republican primary results
Party	Candidate	Votes	%
Republican	James Moylan (incumbent)	4,972	60.10
Republican	Mary Camacho Torres	3,288	39.74
Write-in		13	0.16
Total votes		8,273	100.00

== Democratic primary ==
=== Candidates ===
==== Nominee ====
- Alicia Limtiaco, former Attorney General of Guam (2007–2010) and United States Attorney for the Districts of Guam and the Northern Mariana Islands (2010–2017)

==== Declined ====
- Chris Barnett, incumbent member of the Guam Legislature (2023–present) (running for re-election)
- Ginger Cruz, businesswoman and nominee for this district in 2024

=== Fundraising ===
Campaign finance reports as of June 30, 2026
Candidate	Raised	Spent	Cash on hand
Alicia Limtiaco (D)	$17,331	$27,281	$7,330
Source: Federal Election Commission

=== Results ===
Democratic primary results
Party	Candidate	Votes	%
Democratic	Alicia Limtiaco	9,975	99.17
Write-in		83	0.83
Total votes		10,058	100.00

== General election ==
=== Fundraising ===
Campaign finance reports as of October 14, 2026
Candidate	Raised	Spent	Cash on hand
James Moylan (R)	$249,127	$192,117	$61,035
Alicia Limtiaco (D)	$49,831	$27,281	$39,730
Source: Federal Election Commission

=== Results ===
2026 Guam's at-large congressional district election
Party	Candidate	Votes	%	±%
Democratic	Alicia Limtiaco	15,645	51.00%	+4.19%
Republican	James Moylan (incumbent)	14,983	48.84%	−3.85%
Write-in	Write-in	49	0.16%	−0.34%
Total valid votes		30,677	97.7	
Turnout		31,414	53.1%	
Registered electors		59,146		
Democratic gain from Republican				
