= 2026 Guam gubernatorial election =

- November 3, 2026

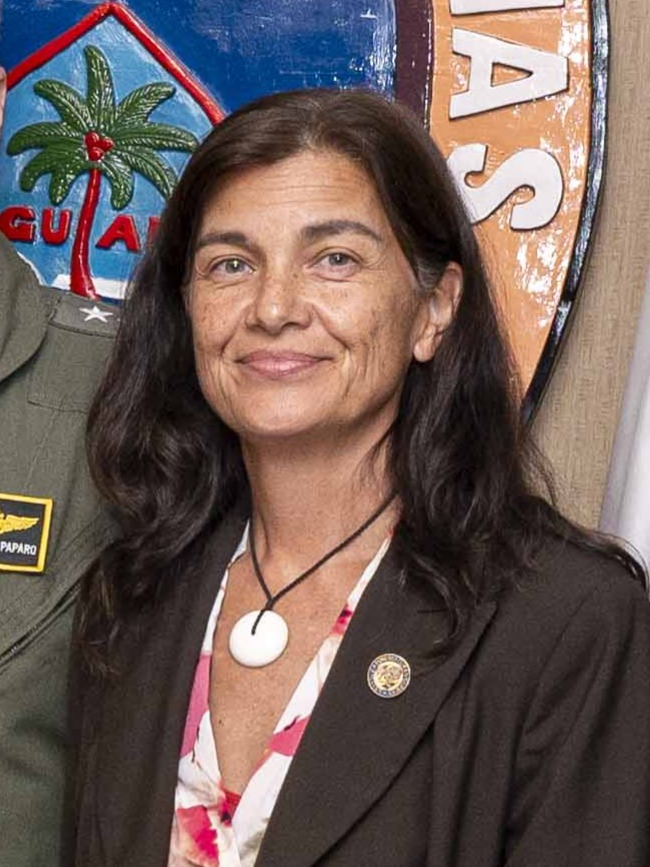
Nominee	Vicente Ada	Therese Terlaje
Party	Republican	Democratic
Running mate	Edward Calvo	Sabina Perez
Popular vote	15,945	14,925
Percentage	51.45%	48.15%
- Results by village Ada: 40–50% 50–60% 60–70% Terlaje: 50–60% 60–70% Tie: 40–50%
Governor before election
Lou Leon Guerrero
Democratic
Elected Governor
Vicente Ada
Republican

The 2026 Guam gubernatorial election took place on November 3, 2026, to elect the next Governor of Guam. Incumbent Democratic Governor Lou Leon Guerrero was term-limited and ineligible to seek a third consecutive term. Primary elections were held on August 1, 2026.

Republican candidate Vicente Ada won the election with 51.5% of the vote, flipping the office from the Democrats by defeating Therese Terlaje who received 48.2% of the vote. This marked the first time since 2014 that a Republican had been elected as Governor of Guam. Guam was also unique in having the only 2026 gubernatorial race that the Republican Party gained from the Democratic Party in what was otherwise dubbed a "blue wave" nationwide.

== Democratic primary ==
=== Candidates ===
==== Nominee ====
- Therese Terlaje, territorial legislator (2017–present) and former speaker of the Guam Legislature (2018–2019, 2021–2025)
  - Running mate: Sabina Perez, territorial legislator (2019–present)

==== Eliminated in primary ====
- Joe S. San Agustin, territorial legislator (2017–present)
  - Running mate: Dwayne San Nicolas, former territorial legislator (2023–2025)
- Josh Tenorio, lieutenant governor of Guam (2019–present)
  - Running mate: Tina Rose Muña Barnes, territorial legislator (2003–2017, 2019–present)

=== Endorsements ===
Joshua Tenorio

Organizations

- LGBTQ+ Victory Fund

=== Results ===
Official primary results by village: Terlaje/Perez: 40–50%; 50–60%; Tenorio/Muña Barnes: 40–50%; 50–60%; 70–80%

Democratic primary results
Party	Candidate	Votes	%
Democratic	Therese Terlaje; Sabina Perez	6,446	47.75
Democratic	Josh Tenorio; Tina Rose Muña Barnes	5,994	44.40
Democratic	Joe S. San Agustin; Dwayne San Nicolas	1,050	7.78
Write-in		9	0.07
Total votes		13,499	100.00

== Republican primary ==
=== Candidates ===
==== Nominee ====
- Vicente Ada, state senator and nominee for lieutenant governor in 2018 and 2022
  - Running mate: Edward Calvo, businessman

==== Eliminated in primary ====
- Frank F. Blas Jr., speaker of the Guam Legislature (2025–present)
  - Running mate: Mary A. Y. Okada, former Guam Community College president

==== Disqualified ====
- Marcel Camacho, former territorial legislator (1999–2000)

==== Declined ====
- Douglas Moylan, Attorney General of Guam (2003–2007, 2023–present) (running for re-election)
- James Moylan, incumbent U.S. Delegate (2023–present) (running for re-election)
- Charlie Hermosa, businessman (running for Lieutenant Governor as an Independent)

=== Endorsements ===
Vicente Ada

Territorywide officials

- Eddie Baza Calvo, former governor of Guam (2011–2019)
- Felix Perez Camacho, former governor of Guam (2003–2011)

=== Results ===
Official primary results by village: Ada/Calvo: 50–60%; 60–70%; 80–90%; Blas/Okada: 50–60%

Republican primary results
Party	Candidate	Votes	%
Republican	Vicente Ada; Edward Calvo	5,179	60.51
Republican	Frank F. Blas Jr.; Mary Ann Young Okada	3,367	39.34
Write-in		13	0.15
Total votes		8,559	100.00

== Independent candidates ==
=== Disqualified ===
- Jeff Pleadwell, businessman
  - Running mate: Charlie Hermosa, businessman

== General election ==
=== Fundraising ===
Campaign finance reports as of October 23, 2026
Candidate	Raised	Spent
Therese Terlaje (D)	$109,381	$17,914
Vincente Ada (R)	$842,950	$774,046
Source: Guam Election Commission

=== Polling ===
Poll source	Date(s) administered	Sample size (Note: Key: A – all adults RV – registered voters LV – likely voters V – unclear)	Margin of error	Therese Terlaje (D)	Vicente Ada (R)	Other
Pacific Daily News	September 21–25, 2026	853 (A)	?	43.5%	56.5%	—
Pacific Daily News	October 19–23, 2026	882 (A)	?	40.6%	59.4%	—
Pasquines	October 15–28, 2026	30 (RV)	?	57.9%	35.4%	6.7%
Pacific Daily News (exit poll)	November 3, 2026	350 (RV)	6.0%	52.0%	48.0%	—

=== Results ===
2026 Guam gubernatorial election
Party	Candidate	Votes	%	±%
Republican	Vicente Ada; Edward Calvo	15,945	51.45%	+7.39%
Democratic	Therese Terlaje; Sabina Perez	14,925	48.15%	–7.34%
Write-in		124	0.40%	–0.05%
Total valid votes		30,994	98.66%	
Turnout		31,414	53.11%	–3.25%
Registered electors		59,146		
Republican gain from Democratic				

==== By village ====
Village	Therese Terlaje Democratic		Vicente Ada Republican		Write-in		Margin		Turnout		Registered voters
Village	#	%	#	%	#	%	#	%	#	%	Registered voters
Agana Heights	472	47.20%	519	51.90%	9	0.90%	47	4.70%	1,000	63.45%	1,576
Asan-Maina	293	52.14%	266	47.33%	3	0.53%	–27	–4.81%	562	62.58%	898
Barrigada	1,080	46.98%	1,205	52.41%	14	0.61%	125	5.43%	2,299	56.68%	4,056
Chalan Pago-Ordot	846	47.85%	916	51.81%	6	0.34%	70	3.96%	1,768	60.34%	2,930
Dededo	3,140	46.86%	3,549	52.96%	12	0.18%	409	6.10%	6,701	45.66%	14,675
Hågat	528	45.52%	630	54.31%	2	0.17%	102	8.79%	1,160	55.19%	2,102
Hagåtña	125	52.08%	115	47.92%	0	0.00%	–10	–4.16%	240	61.07%	393
Humåtak	86	32.33%	180	67.67%	0	0.00%	94	35.34%	266	59.11%	450
Inalåhan	464	49.95%	464	49.95%	1	0.11%	0	±0.00%	929	63.76%	1,457
Malesso	364	63.08%	210	36.40%	3	0.52%	–154	–26.68%	577	61.45%	939
Mangilao	1,400	49.79%	1,402	49.86%	10	0.36%	2	0.07%	2,812	53.04%	5,302
Mongmong-Toto-Maite	554	42.91%	733	56.78%	4	0.31%	179	13.87%	1,291	55.46%	2,328
Piti	219	42.94%	286	56.08%	5	0.98%	67	13.14%	510	59.58%	856
Sånta Rita-Sumai	564	51.09%	534	48.37%	6	0.54%	–30	–2.72%	1,104	57.26%	1,928
Sinajana	507	49.18%	519	50.34%	5	0.48%	12	1.16%	1,031	61.33%	1,681
Talo'fo'fo	582	54.96%	466	44.00%	11	1.04%	–116	–10.96%	1,059	57.59%	1,839
Tamuning	1,036	41.34%	1,452	57.94%	18	0.72%	416	16.60%	2,506	45.00%	5,569
Yigo	1,628	48.28%	1,734	51.42%	10	0.30%	106	3.14%	3,372	47.39%	7,116
Yona	1,037	57.39%	765	42.34%	5	0.28%	–272	–15.05%	1,807	59.23%	3,051

== See also ==
- 2026 Guam elections
