= 2024 Guamanian legislative election =

- November 5, 2024

All 15 seats in the Legislature of Guam 8 seats needed for a majority
- Turnout: 48.77% (▼7.58pp)
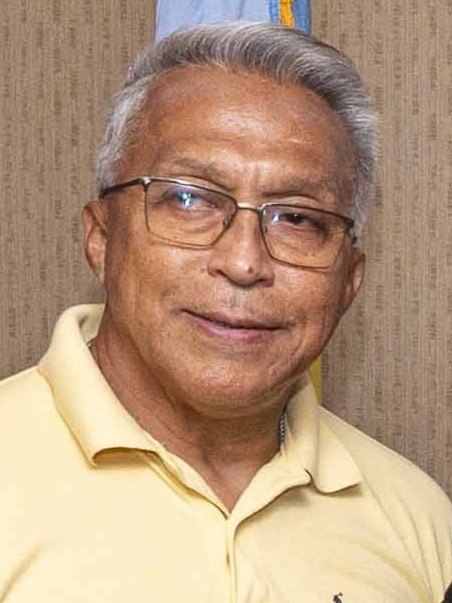

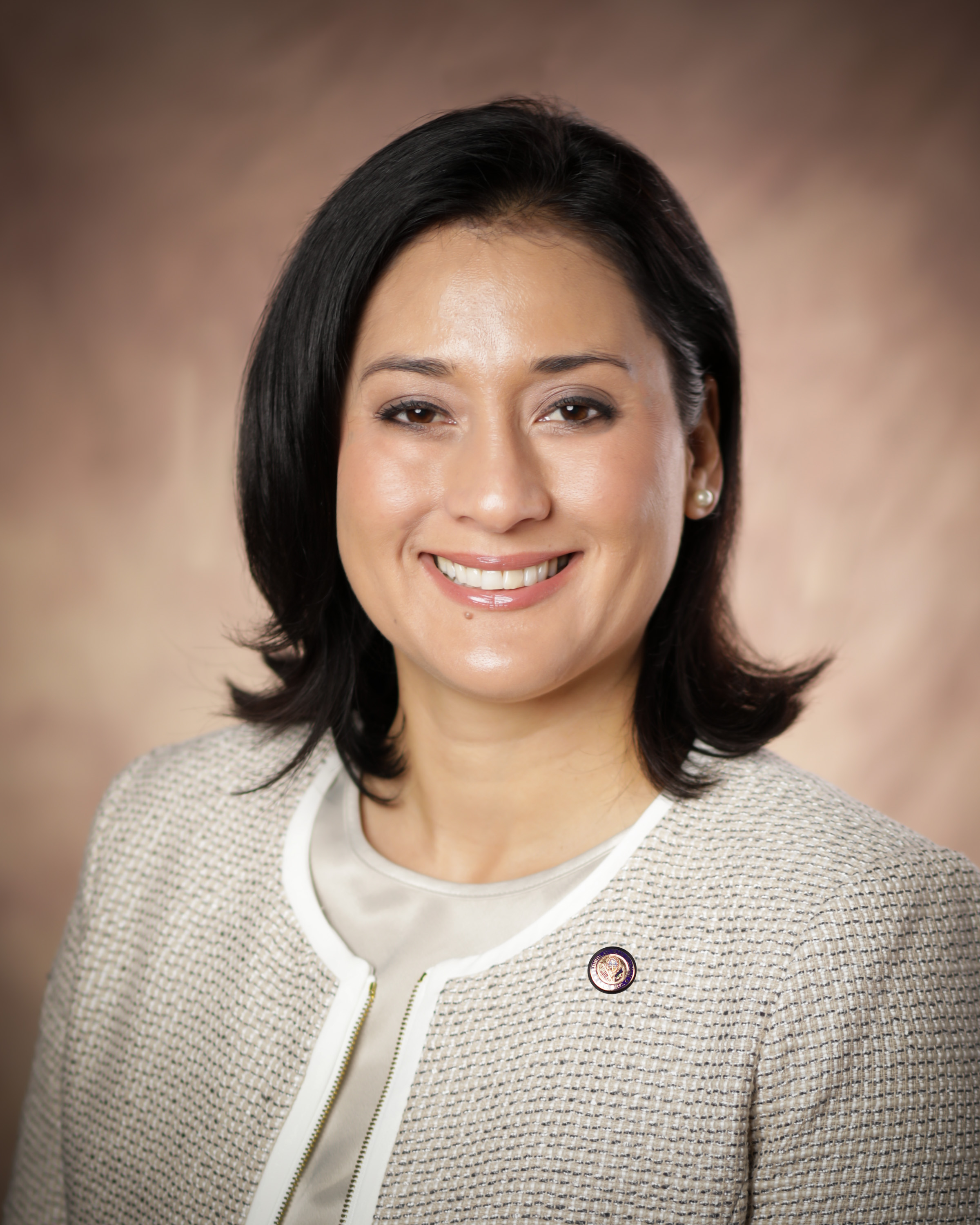
	Majority party	Minority party
Leader	Jesse A. Lujan	Telena Cruz Nelson
Party	Republican	Democratic
Last election	41.13%, 6 seats	58.71%, 9 seats
Seats won	9	6
Seat change	▲3	▼3
Popular vote	163,485	140,197
Percentage	53.67%	46.02%
Swing	▲12.54pp	▼12.69pp
Speaker before election
Therese M. Terlaje
Democratic
Elected Speaker
Frank F. Blas Jr.
Republican

The 2024 Guamanian legislative election was held in Guam on November 5, 2024. This was the first time since 2006 that the Republicans had won a majority in the legislature.

== Results ==
Party	Votes	%	Seats	+/–
Republican Party	163,485	53.67	9	+3
Democratic Party	140,197	46.02	6	–3
Write-in	947	0.31	–	–
Total	304,629	100.00	15	0
Valid votes	30,277	99.98		
Invalid/blank votes	6	0.02		
Total votes	30,283	100.00		
Registered voters/turnout	62,098	48.77		
Source: Guam Election Commission

=== Results by candidate ===
Candidate	Party	Votes	%
Therese M. Terlaje (incumbent)	Democratic Party	20,189	6.63
Darrel Christopher Barnett (incumbent)	Democratic Party	18,139	5.95
Vicente Anthony Borja Ada	Republican Party	16,711	5.49
Joe Shimizu San Agustin (incumbent)	Democratic Party	15,501	5.09
Tina Rose Muna Barnes (incumbent)	Democratic Party	14,662	4.81
Sabrina Salas Matanane	Republican Party	14,659	4.81
Jesse Anderson Lujan (incumbent)	Republican Party	14,185	4.66
Frank Flores Blas Jr. (incumbent)	Republican Party	14,020	4.60
Shelly Calvo	Republican Party	13,149	4.32
William Mark Parkinson (incumbent)	Democratic Party	12,503	4.10
Christopher M. Duenas (incumbent)	Republican Party	12,254	4.02
Vincent A. V. Borja	Republican Party	12,143	3.99
Sabina Perez (incumbent)	Democratic Party	12,077	3.96
Telo Teresa Taitague (incumbent)	Republican Party	11,627	3.82
Eulogio Gumataotao	Republican Party	11,526	3.78
Roy Anthony Quinata (incumbent)	Democratic Party	11,246	3.69
Dwayne Thomas San Nicolas (incumbent)	Democratic Party	11,240	3.69
Joanne M. Brown (incumbent)	Republican Party	11,103	3.64
Angela Therese Ann Santos	Democratic Party	10,431	3.42
Thomas Joseph Fisher	Republican Party	10,247	3.36
Victor A. Gaza	Republican Party	8,916	2.93
David Walter Crisostomo	Democratic Party	7,606	2.50
William Payne	Republican Party	7,188	2.36
David Ralph Duenas	Democratic Party	6,603	2.17
Bistra Ivanova Mendiola	Republican Party	5,757	1.89
Write-in		947	0.31
Total		304,629	100.00
Valid votes		30,277	99.98
Invalid/blank votes		6	0.02
Total votes		30,283	100.00
Registered voters/turnout		62,098	48.77
