= Governor Ada =

Governor Ada may refer to:

- Joseph Franklin Ada (born 1943), 5th Governor of Guam
- Vicente Ada (born 1966/1967), 10th Governor-elect of Guam
