= Roy A.B. Quinata =

Guamanian politician

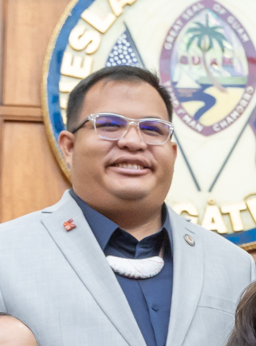

Member of the Guam Legislature
- In office January 2, 2023 – January 2025

Personal details
- Born: Yigo, Guam, U.S.
- Party: Democratic
- Education: Simon Sanchez High School

Roy Anthony Benavente Quinata is a Guamanian politician. A member of the Democratic Party, Quinata served as a Senator in the Guam Legislature during the 37th Legislature from 2023 to 2025.

== Political Career ==
=== Guam Legislature (2021–2023) ===
Quinata was an elected during the 2022 election, assuming office in 2023. He was an unsuccessful candidate for reelection in the 2024 general election.

Quinata has filed to run in the 2026 election, hoping to get back to the Guam legislature.

=== Outside of Office ===
Prior to his senatorial duties, Quinata was a Legislative Aide for Senator Tommy Morrison, Executive Director for Micronesia Community Development Corp, Legislative Aide for 36th Guam Legislature, and a Community Liaison for Sen. Amanda Shelton.

As of February 2025, Quinata works in the administration of Governor Lou Leon Guerrero with a portfolio of capital improvement initiatives.
