= Wil Castro =

American politician

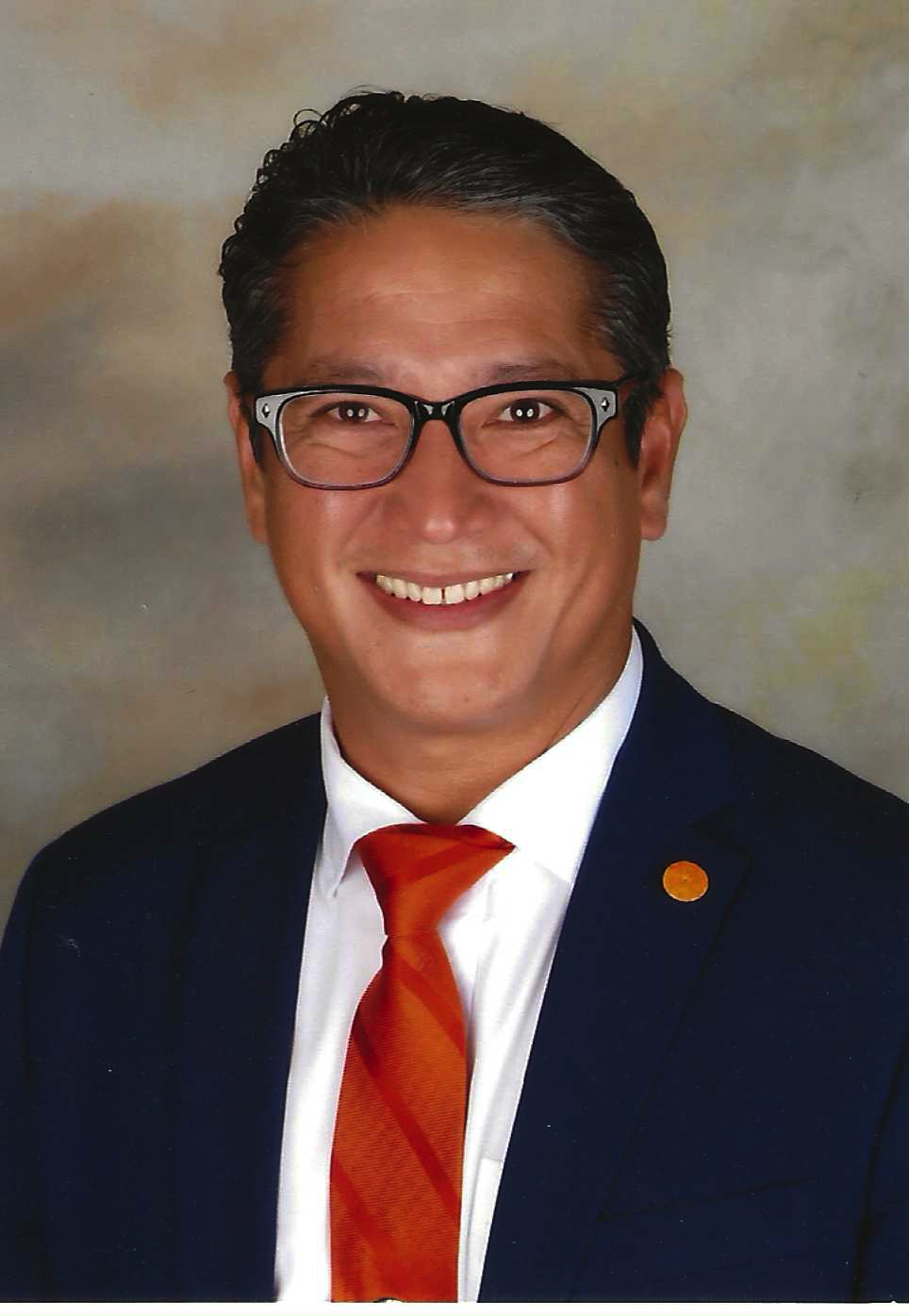
- Castro in 2025

Minority Leader of the Guam Legislature
- In office January 7, 2019 – January 7, 2021
- Preceded by: James Espaldon
- Succeeded by: Jim Moylan

Member of the Guam Legislature
- In office January 5, 2017 – January 7, 2021

Personal details
- Born: William Mendiola Castro
- Party: Republican
- Education: University of Guam (BA); Harvard Graduate School of Education (M.Ed)

William Mendiola Castro is an educator and politician from Guam. He served in the 34th and 35th Guam Legislature.

== Education and career ==
He attained doctoral candidacy at Teachers College, Columbia University. He attained a Masters Degree from the Harvard Graduate School of Education. He holds a Bachelor's Degree from the University of Guam. Castro also attained graduate credits from M.I.T. and Gwynedd Mercy University.

Castro is a principal and teacher of indigenous studies at a career and technical charter high school on Guam. He served as interim chief technology officer, Director of the Bureau of Statistics and Plans, and was a Member of the Senior Staff for Governor Eddie Baza Calvo. He was made Chief of Staff to Governor Ralph Torres in 2021.

He was the chief planner and acting associate superintendent (for vocational and technical education, as well as administration) at the Guam Public School System. Castro also served as the Director of Institutional Effectiveness for the Northern Marianas College. He was the Director of Advancement at St. John's School on Guam.

== Political career ==
Castro joined the Republican Party in 2012. He was an unsuccessful candidate for the Guam Legislature in 2014. He was a successful candidate and the top vote getter among Republicans in the 2016 election. Castro served as the minority leader in the 35th Guam Legislature.

Castro was the Republican nominee for Guam's at-large congressional district in the 2020 United States House of Representatives election in Guam.

Castro is a candidate for one of the fifteen spots on the Republican ticket for the Guam Legislature in the 2026 election.

== Civic memberships ==
Wil Castro served as the District Deputy for the Guam State Council Knights of Columbus, and Past Worthy Grand Knight, Knights of Columbus Council 13373, Santa Teresita Mangilao Parish. He is an Honorary Member of the Barrigada Municipal Planning Council, and is a member of the Young Men’s League of Guam.
