= 2020 United States House of Representatives election in Guam =

- November 3, 2020 (first round); November 17, 2020 (runoff)
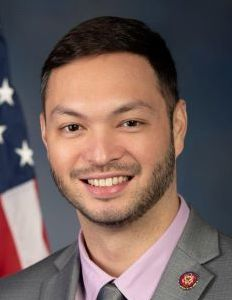

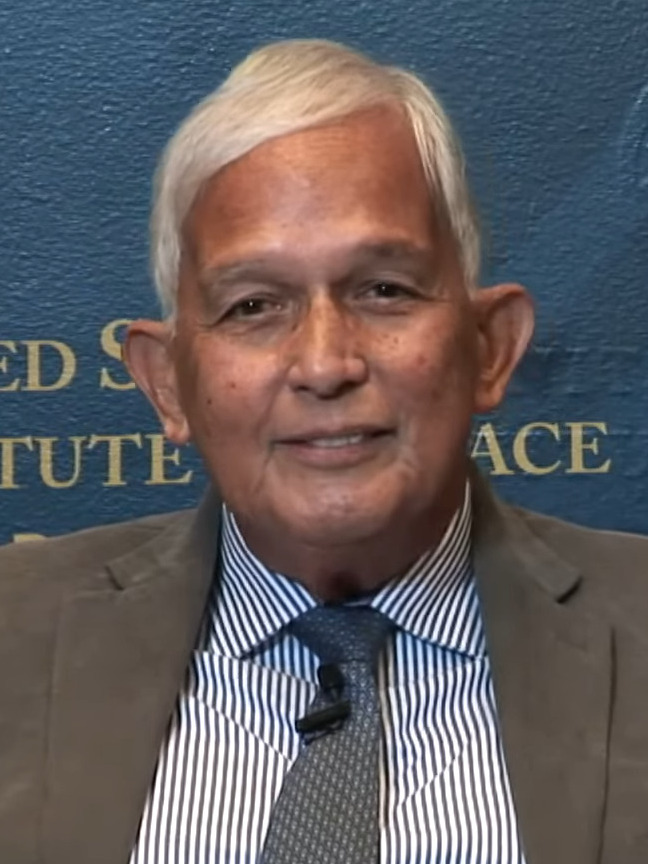

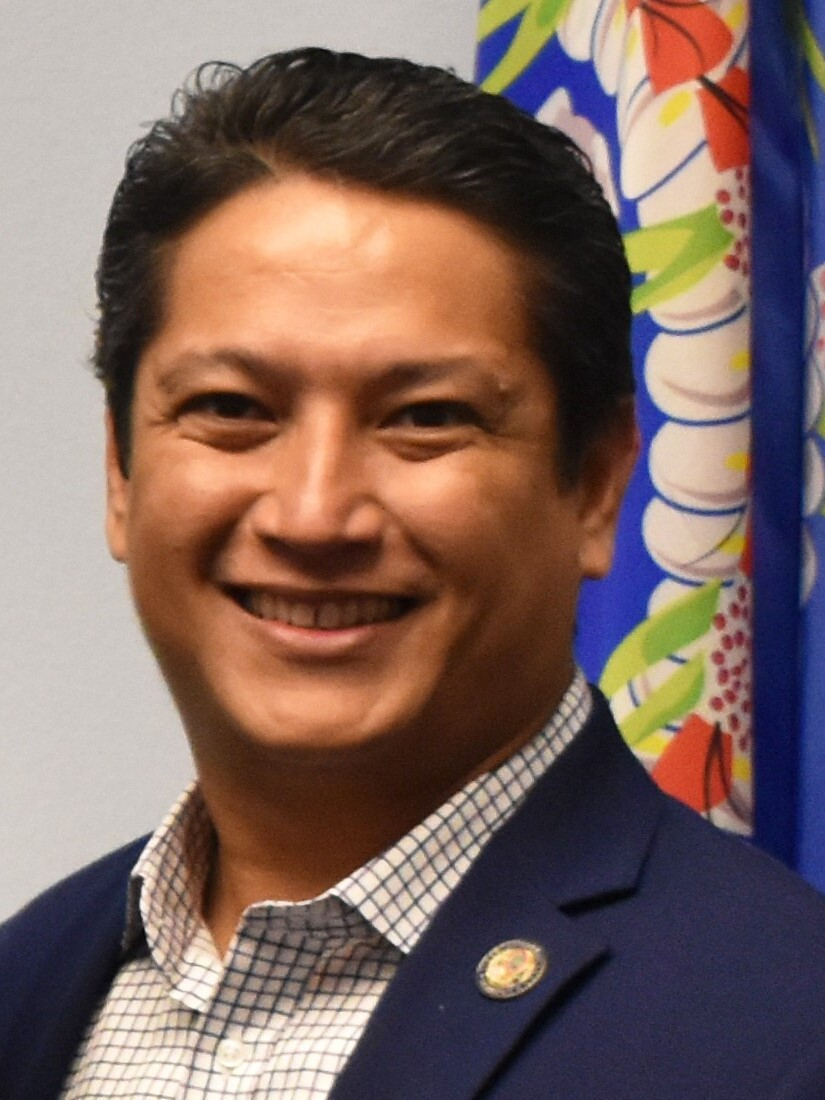
Candidate	Michael San Nicolas	Robert Underwood	Wil Castro
Party	Democratic	Democratic	Republican
First round	13,000; 45.95%	9,300; 32.87%	5,942; 21.0%
Runoff	10,467; 59.62%	7,090; 40.38%	Eliminated
- Runoff election results by village: Michael San Nicolas: 50–55% 55–60% 60–65% 65–70% 75–80% Robert A. Underwood: 50–55% Tie
Delegate before election
Michael San Nicolas
Democratic
Elected Delegate
Michael San Nicolas
Democratic

The 2020 United States House of Representatives election in Guam was held on Tuesday, November 3, 2020, to elect the non-voting Delegate to the United States House of Representatives from Guam's at-large congressional district. The election coincided with the elections of other federal and state offices, including the larger 2020 United States House of Representatives elections and the 2020 Guamanian legislative election.

The non-voting delegate is elected for a two-year term. Incumbent freshman Delegate Rep. Michael San Nicolas, who was first elected in 2018, is seeking a second term. He was challenged by former U.S. Rep. Robert A. Underwood (Guam delegate from 1993 to 2003), a Democrat, and Republican Wil Castro. As no one got a majority of the vote, San Nicolas and Underwood faced off in a runoff within two weeks. The Guam Election Commission set the runoff election for Tuesday, November 17, 2020.

== Primary ==
Because of the COVID-19 pandemic, Guam cancelled its August primary elections. All three certified candidates advanced to the U.S. House general election and appeared on the ballot in November 2020.

== General election ==
Guam Delegate general election results, 2020
Party	Candidate	Votes	%
Democratic	Michael F.Q. San Nicolas (inc.)	13,000	45.95
Democratic	Robert Anacletus Underwood	9,300	32.87
Republican	William Mendiola Castro	5,942	21.00
Write-in		51	0.18
Total votes		28,293	100.00

== Runoff ==
Guam Delegate election runoff results, 2020
Party	Candidate	Votes	%
Democratic	Michael F.Q. San Nicolas (inc.)	10,467	59.62
Democratic	Robert Anacletus Underwood	7,090	40.38
—	Overvotes	5	.03
—	Undervotes	28	.16
Total votes		17,355	100.00

Official results from the Guam Election Commission
