= Simon Sanchez High School =

Public high school in Yigo, Guam, United States

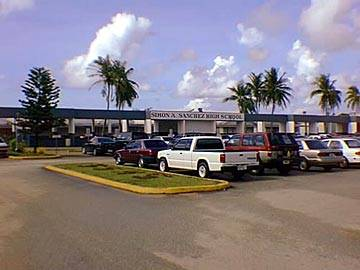
- Simon Sanchez High School in 2010

Location
- 395 Juan Jacinto Road, Yigo, Guam 96929; Yigo, Guam; 13.5278°N 144.8761°E

Information
- Type: Public School
- Motto: "Home of the Sharks"
- School district: Guam Department of Education
- Principal: Carla D. Masnayon
- Grades: 9–12
- Enrollment: 2,347 (SY 2011-2012)
- Colors: Black Gray, and White
- Mascot: Sharks
- Accreditation: Western Association of Schools and Colleges
- Website: sshs.gdoe.net

Simon A. Sanchez High School (SSHS) is a public high school located in the village of Yigo, in the United States territory of Guam. The school is a part of the Guam Department of Education.

== Overview ==
Simon Sanchez High serves all of Yigo and a portion of Dededo village.

== History ==
The school opened as a middle school in 1974 and became a high school in 1981 to serve northeastern Guam.

In 2023, the school was temporarily shutdown by Guam Department of Education.

== Leadership ==
The current Principal and Assistant Principals are:

- Principal: Carla D. Masnayon
- Assistant Principals: Jessica Fejeran, Melvin Finona, Keith Quiambao, & Dr. Ronald Canos.

== Notable alumni ==
- Julian Aguon – human rights attorney
- Roy A.B. Quinata – member of the Legislature of Guam
- Rain Valdez – actress, writer, and producer

== Notable faculty ==
- Sabina Perez – member of the Legislature of Guam
