= Edward Calvo (lieutenant governor) =

Guamanian politician

Lieutenant Governor-elect of Guam
- Assuming office January 4, 2027
- Governor: Vicente Ada (elect)
- Succeeding: Josh Tenorio

Personal details
- Born: Edward John Calvo
- Party: Republican
- Education: Menlo College (BS); Hawaii Pacific University (MBA)

Edward John "E. J." Calvo is a Guamanian politician.

He was the Republican nominee in the 2026 election for Lieutenant Governor of Guam, running alongside Vice Speaker Vicente Ada. They defeated the Democratic ticket of Therese Terlaje and Sabina Perez to win the general election. He has a bachelor's from Menlo College and a Master of Business Administration from Hawaii Pacific University.

Legal offices
Preceded by Josh Tenorio	Lieutenant Governor of Guam; Taking office 2027	Elect
