= James Moylan =

Guamanian-American politician (born 1962)

Jim Moylan
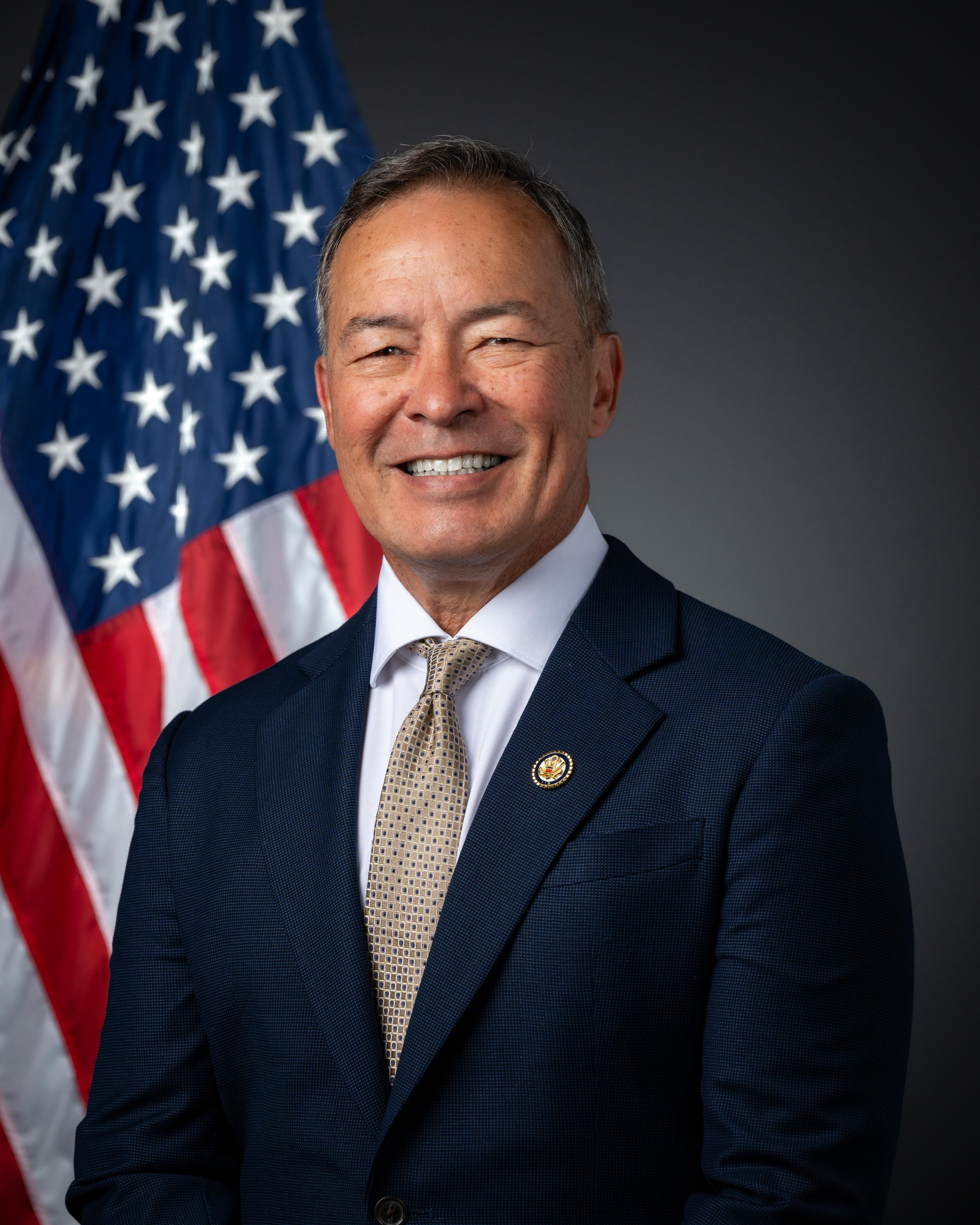
- Official portrait, 2025

Delegate to the U.S. House of Representatives from Guam's at-large district
- Incumbent
- Assumed office January 3, 2023
- Preceded by: Michael San Nicolas

Minority Leader of the Guam Legislature
- In office January 4, 2021 – March 22, 2021
- Preceded by: Wil Castro
- Succeeded by: Christopher Duenas

Member of the Guam Legislature
- In office January 7, 2019 – January 3, 2023

Personal details
- Born: James Camacho Moylan; July 18, 1962 (age 64) Tumon, Guam, U.S.
- Party: Republican
- Children: 2
- Education: University of Guam (BS)
- Website: House website

Military service
- Allegiance: United States
- Branch/service: United States Army
- Moylan's voice Moylan on the denial of SSI benefits within U.S. territories. Recorded January 30, 2023

James Camacho Moylan (born July 18, 1962) is a Guamanian politician and Army veteran serving as the delegate to the U.S. House of Representatives for Guam's at-large congressional district since 2023. A member of the Republican Party, he previously served as a member of the Guam Legislature from 2019 to 2023. Moylan is one of two Chamorro members of Congress, alongside Kimberlyn King-Hinds.

== Education ==
Moylan graduated from John F. Kennedy High School and earned a Bachelor of Science degree in criminal justice from the University of Guam.

== Early political career ==
Prior to entering politics, Moylan served as a commissioned officer in the United States Army and parole officer for the Guam Department of Corrections. He was elected to the Guam Legislature in 2018 and assumed office in 2019. Moylan is also a licensed insurance agent.

== U.S. House ==
Moylan was the Republican nominee for the 2022 United States House of Representatives election in Guam. He won the election, defeating Judith Won Pat. He is the first Republican to represent Guam as a delegate since Vicente T. Blaz in 1993.

=== Committee assignments ===
For the 119th Congress:

- Committee on Armed Services
  - Subcommittee on Readiness
  - Subcommittee on Seapower and Projection Forces
- Committee on Education and Workforce
  - Early Childhood, Elementary, and Secondary Education
  - Higher Education and Workforce Development
- Committee on Foreign Affairs
  - Subcommittee on the Indo-Pacific
  - Subcommittee on South and Central Asia

Previous assignments:

- Committee on Natural Resources (118th)
  - Subcommittee on Indian and Insular Affairs
  - Subcommittee on Federal Lands

=== Caucus memberships ===
- U.S.-Philippines Friendship Caucus (Co-Chair)
- Pacific Islands Caucus
- Congressional Western Caucus
- Problem Solvers Caucus
- Republican Study Committee
  - Co-Chair of the National Security Task Force

== Legislation ==
=== Reaffirming the ties between the United States and the Philippines ===
In the 118th Congress he sponsored a resolution that reaffirmed the U.S. commitment to defend the Philippines under the 1951 Mutual Defense Treaty if its assets are attacked in the South China Sea, called for joint patrols with the Philippines, rejected China’s territorial claims there, and welcomed implementation of the Enhanced Defense Cooperation Agreement.

=== Deliver for Veterans Act ===
In the 118th Congress and 119th Congress he sponsored a bill that amends Title 38 of the U.S. Code to authorize the VA to pay not only the full purchase price for adaptive vehicles provided to disabled veterans or service members, but also the shipping/delivery costs.

=== Support for expunging Trump's impeachment ===
In the 118th Congress he co-sponsored a pair of resolutions meant to expunge the impeachments of Donald Trump. In the 119th United States Congress, he again co-sponsored resolutions to expunge Trump's impeachments.

=== Guam Service Academy Equality Act ===
In the 118th Congress he sponsored a bill that adjusted the number of cadets to be nominated to the United States Military Academy, United States Naval Academy, and United States Airforce Academy from the Delegate in Congress from Guam.

- Enacted in National Defense Authorization Act for Fiscal Year 2024.

== Personal life ==
His mother, Maria Camacho Moylan, was related to Carlos Camacho. Through his father, who was the brother of Scotty Moylan, he is first cousin to Kurt Moylan, whose son Kaleo Moylan and nephew Douglas Moylan are thereby his first cousins once removed.

== Election results ==
2022 United States House of Representatives election in Guam
Primary election
Party	Candidate	Votes	%
Republican	James Moylan	2,632	99.66
Write-in		9	0.34
Total votes		2,641	100.00
General election
Republican	James Moylan	17,260	52.12
Democratic	Judith T. Won Pat	15,636	47.22
Write-in		220	0.66
Total votes		33,116	100.00
Republican gain from Democratic			

2024 United States House of Representatives election in Guam
Primary election
Party	Candidate	Votes	%
Republican	James Moylan (incumbent)	3,987	99.03
Write-in		39	0.97
Total votes		4,026	100.00
General election
Republican	James Moylan (incumbent)	15,573	52.70
Democratic	Ginger Cruz	13,829	46.80
Write-in		149	0.50
Total votes		29,551	100.00
Republican hold			

2026 United States House of Representatives election in Guam
Primary election
Party	Candidate	Votes	%
Republican	James Moylan (incumbent)	4,972	60.10%
Republican	Mary Camacho Torres	3,288	39.74%
Write-in		13	0.16
Total votes		8,273	100.00
General election
Democratic	Alicia Limtiaco	15,645	51.00%
Republican	James Moylan (incumbent)	14,983	48.84%
Write-in		49	0.16%
Total votes		30,677	100.00
Democratic gain from Republican			

Legislature of Guam
Preceded by Wil Castro	Minority Leader of the Guam Legislature; 2021	Succeeded by Christopher Duenas
U.S. House of Representatives
Preceded by Michael San Nicolas	Delegate to the U.S. House of Representatives from Guam's at-large congressional district 2023–present	Incumbent
U.S. order of precedence (ceremonial)
Preceded by Amata Coleman Radewagen	United States delegates by seniority 4th	Succeeded by Pablo Hernández Rivera
