= Frank F. Blas Jr. =

Guamanian politician

Frank Blas
- Blas in 2026

Speaker of the Guam Legislature
- Incumbent
- Assumed office January 6, 2025
- Preceded by: Therese M. Terlaje

Minority Leader of the Guam Legislature
- In office January 2, 2023 – January 6, 2025
- Preceded by: Chris Duenas
- Succeeded by: Vacant
- In office January 3, 2011 – January 7, 2013
- Preceded by: Eddie Calvo
- Succeeded by: Tony Ada

Member of the Guam Legislature
- Incumbent
- Assumed office January 4, 2021
- In office January 2015 – January 2017
- In office January 2007 – January 2013

Personal details
- Born: Frank Flores Blas Jr. May 15, 1962 (age 64)
- Party: Republican
- Relatives: Frank Blas (father)
- Education: Guam Community College (attended); University of Guam (attended); University of Maryland, College Park (attended)

Frank Flores Blas Jr. (born May 15, 1962) is a Guamanian politician. A member of the Republican Party, he has served in the Guam Legislature from 2007 to 2012, from 2015 to 2017 and since 2021.

== Biography ==
Frank Flores Blas Jr. was born May 15, 1962, to Frank Blas Sr., who served as the 5th lieutenant governor of Guam from 1987-1995, and Lydia Calvo.

He served as a police officer. He also served as the homeland security advisor for Guam during Felix Perez Camacho's first term.

Blas announced that he would seek the Republican nomination to run for governor of Guam in the 2026 gubernatorial election. He selected Mary Ann Young Okada, a former Guam Community College president as his running mate. He and Okada were defeated by a ticket of Vice Speaker Tony Ada and businessman Edward John Calvo in the Republican primary.

Legislature of Guam
| Preceded by Eddie Calvo | Minority Leader of the Guam Legislature; 2011–2013 | Succeeded by Tony Ada |
| Preceded by Chris Duenas | Minority Leader of the Guam Legislature; 2023–2025 | Vacant |
Political offices
| Preceded by Therese M. Terlaje | Speaker of the Guam Legislature; 2025–present | Incumbent |
