= 2024 United States House of Representatives election in Guam =

- November 5, 2024
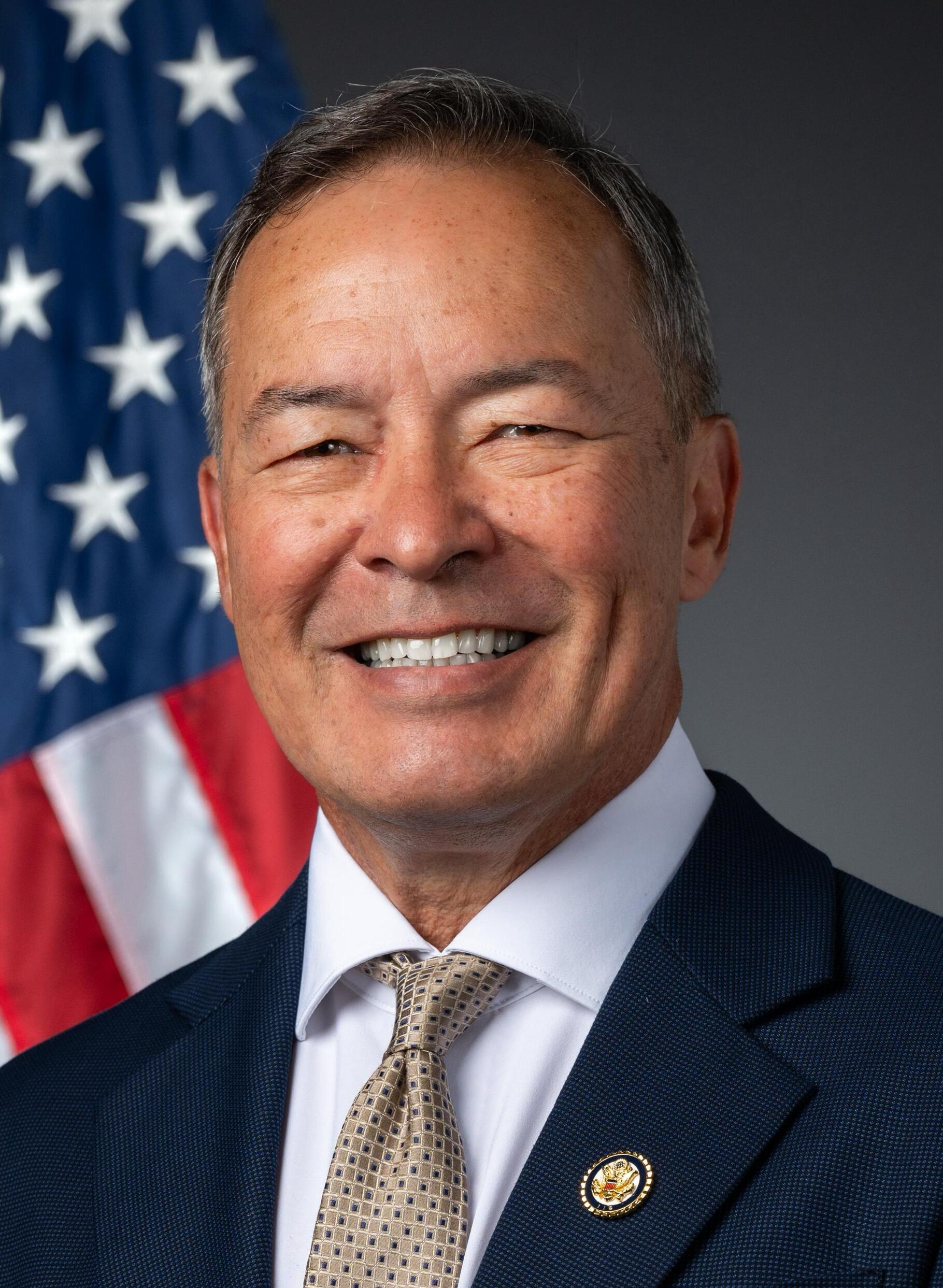

Nominee	James Moylan	Ginger Cruz
Party	Republican	Democratic
Popular vote	15,422	13,703
Percentage	52.69%	46.81%
- Results by village Moylan: 50–60% 60–70% Cruz: 50–60%
Delegate before election
James Moylan
Republican
Elected Delegate
James Moylan
Republican

The 2024 United States House of Representatives election in Guam was held on November 5, 2024, to elect the non-voting delegate to the United States House of Representatives from Guam's at-large congressional district. The election coincided with the 2024 Guamanian general election which will decide other federal and state offices, including elections to the Legislature of Guam.

The non-voting delegate is selected for a two-year term. Incumbent delegate James Moylan, who was first elected in 2022 with 52.2% of the vote, was re-elected to a second term.

== Republican primary ==
=== Candidates ===
==== Nominee ====
- James Moylan, incumbent delegate

=== Results ===
Republican primary official results
Party	Candidate	Votes	%
Republican	James Moylan (incumbent)	3,987	99.03%
Write-in		39	0.97%
Total votes		4,026	100%

== Democratic primary ==
=== Candidates ===
==== Nominee ====
- Ginger Cruz, businesswoman and former TV news anchor

==== Eliminated in primary ====
- Michael San Nicolas, former delegate and candidate for governor of Guam in 2022
- Amanda Shelton, majority whip of the Guam Legislature

==== Withdrawn ====
- David Lotz, environmental activist

=== Results ===
Results by village: Ginger Cruz: 35–40% 40–45% 45–50% 60–65% Amanda Shelton: 35–40% 40–45% 50–55% 55–60%

Democratic primary official results
Party	Candidate	Votes	%
Democratic	Ginger Cruz	5,163	40.69%
Democratic	Amanda Shelton	4,301	33.90%
Democratic	Michael San Nicolas	3,189	25.13%
Write-in		35	0.28%
Total votes		12,688	100%

== General election ==
=== Polling ===
Poll source	Date(s) administered	Sample size (Note: Key: A – all adults RV – registered voters LV – likely voters V – unclear)	Margin of error	James Moylan (R)	Ginger Cruz (D)	Other	Undecided
Pasquines	October 21 – November 1, 2024	161 (V)	–	28%	66%	3% (Note: "None of the above" with 3%)	3%
University of Guam	August 19–21, 2024	–	–	46%	54%	–	–

=== Results ===
2024 United States House of Representatives election in Guam
Party	Candidate	Votes	%	±%
Republican	James Moylan (incumbent)	15,422	52.69%	+0.57%
Democratic	Ginger Cruz	13,703	46.81%	−0.41%
Write-in		146	0.50%	-0.16%
Total votes		29,271	100.00%	
