= 2024 Guam elections =

- November 5, 2024

The 2024 Guam elections were held in the U.S. territory of Guam on November 5, 2024, as part of the 2024 United States elections. Voters in Guam chose their non-voting delegate to the United States House of Representatives, attorney general, supreme court judges and all fifteen members of the territorial legislature. The elections were held on the same day as the 2024 United States elections.

== Federal office ==
=== President ===
==== General election ====
- 2024 United States presidential straw poll in Guam

==== Republican primary ====
- 2024 Guam Republican primary

==== Democratic primary ====
- 2024 Guam Democratic primary

=== United States House of Representatives ===
- 2024 United States House of Representatives election in Guam

== Statewide office ==
=== Legislature ===
- 2024 Guamanian legislative election

=== Public Auditor ===
Incumbent auditor Benjamin Cruz won re-election to a second full term.

2024 Guam Public Auditor election
Party	Candidate	Votes	%
Nonpartisan	Benjamin Cruz (incumbent)	24,905	99.12%
Write-in		220	0.88%
Total votes		25,125	100.00%

=== State Board of Education ===
The following won the State Board of Education election.

- Peter Ada, (incumbent) (Nonpartisan)
- Maria Gutierrez, (incumbent) (Nonpartisan)
- Ronald McNinch, (incumbent) (Nonpartisan)
- Mary Okada, (incumbent) (Nonpartisan)
- Angel Sablan, (incumbent) (Nonpartisan)
- Judith Guthertz, (Nonpartisan)

=== Utilities commission ===
Pedro Martinez (incumbent) and Melvin Duenas won the election.

=== Local elections ===
- 2024 Guamanian local elections

== Judicial elections ==
=== Retention ===
Robert J. Torres Jr. was retained to the Supreme Court with 88.6% of the vote.
