= Dwayne San Nicolas =

Guamanian politician

Member of the Guam Legislature
- In office January 2, 2023 – January 6, 2025

Personal details
- Born: Hågat, Guam
- Party: Democratic
- Education: Guam Community College (attended); University of Guam (BA, MA)

Dwayne San Nicolas is a Guamanian politician. A member of the Democratic Party, he served in the Guam Legislature from 2023 to 2025.
