= William A. Parkinson =

Filipino-born Guamanian politician

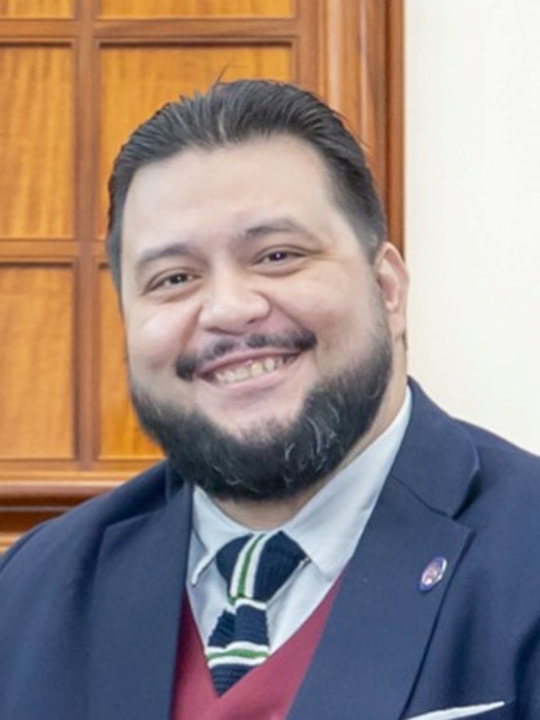
- Parkinson in 2024

Member of the Guam Legislature
- Incumbent
- Assumed office January 2, 2023

Personal details
- Born: William Mark Alkonga Parkinson Makati, Philippines
- Party: Democratic
- Parent: Don Parkinson (father)

William Mark Alkonga Parkinson is a Filipino-born Guamanian politician. A member of the Democratic Party, he served in the Guam Legislature since 2023.
