= Vince Borja =

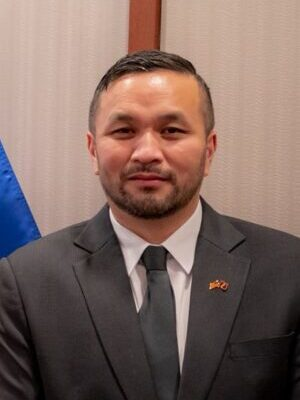

Member of the Guam Legislature
- Incumbent
- Assumed office January 2025

Vincent Anthony Velasco Borja is a Republican member of the Legislature of Guam.
