= Eulogio Gumataotao =

Guamanian politician

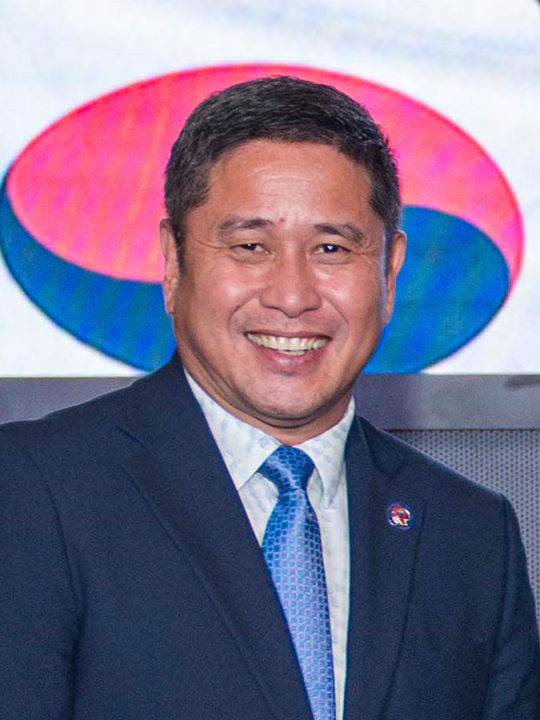

Member of the Guam Legislature
- Incumbent
- Assumed office January 6, 2025

Personal details
- Born: Eulogio Shawn Gumataotao Tamuning, Guam
- Party: Republican
- Education: California State University, Bakersfield

Eulogio Shawn Gumataotao is a Guamanian politician. A member of the Republican Party, he served in the Guam Legislature since 2025.

== Life and career ==
Gumataotao was born in Tamuning, Guam. He attended California State University, Bakersfield, earning his bachelor's degree in 1994.

In November 2024, Gumataotao placed 15th in the general election of the Guam Legislature, winning 11,526 votes. He assumed office on January 6, 2025.
