= Jesse A. Lujan =

Guamanian politician

Jesse Lujan
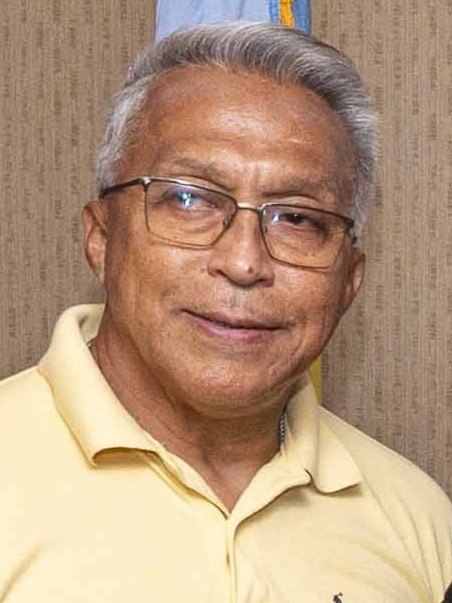

Majority Leader of the Guam Legislature
- Incumbent
- Assumed office January 6, 2025
- Preceded by: Rory Respicio

Member of the Guam Legislature
- Incumbent
- Assumed office January 2, 2023
- In office January 2003 – January 2009

Personal details
- Born: Jesse Anderson Lujan; September 27, 1955 (age 71) Guam
- Party: Republican
- Spouse: Sandra Guy-Willoughby
- Children: Ryan Guy
- Education: San Diego State University

Jesse Anderson Lujan (born September 27, 1955) is a Guamanian politician. A member of the Republican Party, he has served in the Guam Legislature from 2003 to 2009 and again since 2023.

Legislature of Guam
Preceded by Chris Dueñas	Majority Leader of the Guam Legislature; 2025–present	Incumbent
