= Shelly V. Calvo =

Guamanian politician

- Calvo in 2026

Member of the Guam Legislature
- Incumbent
- Assumed office 2025

Personal details
- Born: Philippines
- Party: Republican

Shelly Vargas Calvo is a Guamanian politician. She serves as a member of the Guam Legislature.

Calvo was born in the Philippines and attended Assumption College. She was formerly nominated to be United States ambassador to the Philippines.
