= 2022 United States House of Representatives election in Guam =

- November 8, 2022
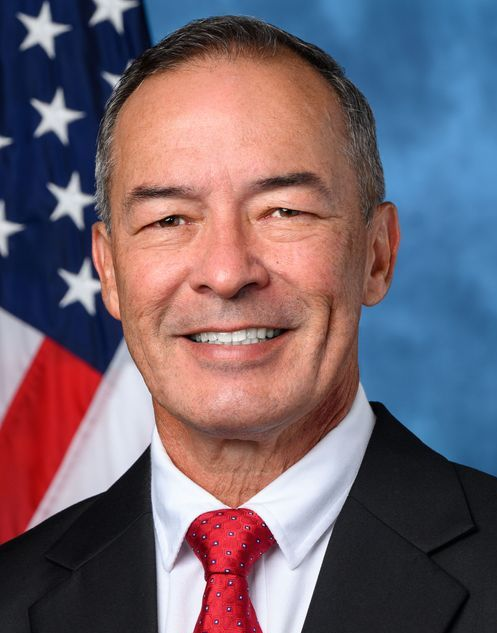

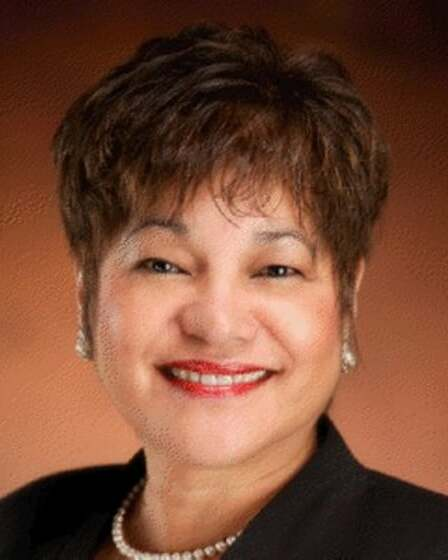
Candidate	James Moylan	Judith Won Pat
Party	Republican	Democratic
Popular vote	17,260	15,636
Percentage	52.12%	47.22%
- Results by village Moylan: 50–60% Won Pat: 40–50% 50–60%
Delegate before election
Michael San Nicolas
Democratic
Elected Delegate
James Moylan
Republican

The 2022 United States House of Representatives election in Guam was held on Tuesday, November 8, 2022, to elect the non-voting Delegate to the United States House of Representatives from Guam's at-large congressional district. The election coincided with the elections of other federal and state offices, including the larger 2022 United States House of Representatives elections and the 2022 Guamanian legislative election.

The non-voting delegate is elected for a two-year term. Incumbent Delegate Michael San Nicolas, who was re-elected with 59.6% of the vote (Note: San Nicolas's opponent was a fellow Democrat, Robert Underwood. In the initial round, San Nicolas and Underwood took a combined total of 78.9% against Republican candidate Wil Castro, who took 21.0%) in 2020, retired to run for governor.

James Moylan, a member of the Guam Legislature, won the election, becoming the first Republican delegate elected in Guam since 1993.

== Democratic primary ==
=== Candidates ===
==== Nominee ====
- Judith Won Pat, former Speaker of the Guam Legislature

==== Eliminated in primary ====
- Telena Cruz Nelson, Majority Leader of the Guam Legislature

==== Declined ====
- Michael San Nicolas, incumbent delegate (running for governor)

=== Results ===
Democratic primary
Party	Candidate	Votes	%
Democratic	Judith Won Pat	9,882	55.43%
Democratic	Telena Cruz Nelson	7,878	44.19%
Write-in		67	0.38%
Total votes		17,827	100.0%

== Republican primary ==
=== Candidates ===
==== Nominee ====
- James Moylan, member and former minority leader of the Guam Legislature

=== Results ===
Republican primary
Party	Candidate	Votes	%
Republican	James Moylan	2,632	99.66%
Write-in		9	0.34%
Total votes		2,641	100.0%

== General election ==
=== Results ===
2022 United States House of Representatives election in Guam
Party	Candidate	Votes	%	±%
Republican	James Moylan	17,260	52.12%	+31.12%
Democratic	Judith Won Pat	15,636	47.22%	−31.60%
Write-in		220	0.66%	+0.48%
Total votes		33,116	100.0%	
Republican gain from Democratic				

== See also ==
- 2022 United States House of Representatives elections
