= Sabrina Salas Matanane =

Guamanian politician

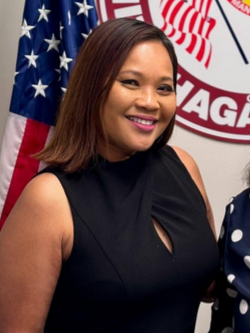
- Salas Matanane in 2025

Member of the Guam Legislature
- Incumbent
- Assumed office January 6, 2025

Personal details
- Born: Sabrina Salas Matanane; April 23, 1971 (age 55)
- Party: Republican (2024-present)
- Other political affiliations: Democratic (2022-2024)
- Education: University of Oklahoma

Sabrina Salas Matanane (born April 23, 1971) is a Guamanian politician and former broadcast journalist. A member of the Republican Party, she serves as a member in the Guam Legislature.

== Early life and education ==
Born in Guam on April 23, 1971, Sabrina Salas Matanane attended Agat Elementary School before moving on to Dededo Middle School. After relocating to Oklahoma, she graduated from Del City High School in 1989 and earned a Bachelor of Arts in Electronic Journalism from the University of Oklahoma.

== Journalism career ==
She began her broadcasting career as an associate producer at KWTV, the CBS affiliate in Oklahoma City. In 1996, she returned to Guam to join Guam Cable News. In 1998, she joined KUAM, where she held roles including managing director, news director, reporter, executive producer, anchor and producer over the next 25 years.

She left KUAM in 2022 to pursue a career in politics.

== 2022 Guam Lieutenant Governor run ==
In 2022, Matanane announced her lieutenant gubernatorial run on April 19, 2022, with Guam Delegate Michael San Nicolas as her running mate.

The San Nicolas/Salas Matanane ticket would eventually lose, only getting 37.6%, as her ticket was defeated in the 2022 Democratic primary by incumbent Governor Lou Leon Guerrero, and her running mate, incumbent Lieutenant Governor Josh Tenorio, who got 62.3%.

== 2024 Guam Legislature run ==
In 2024, Matanane announced her run for the Guam Legislature. She ran as a Republican.

She eventually won, placing 6th, and getting 14,659 votes.

== Senate career ==
Matanane started her term on January 6, 2025.

She was appointed as Legislative Secretary, and the chair of the Committee on Health and Veterans Affairs.
