= Yigo, Guam =

Coordinates: 13°32′04″N 144°53′08″E

- Village
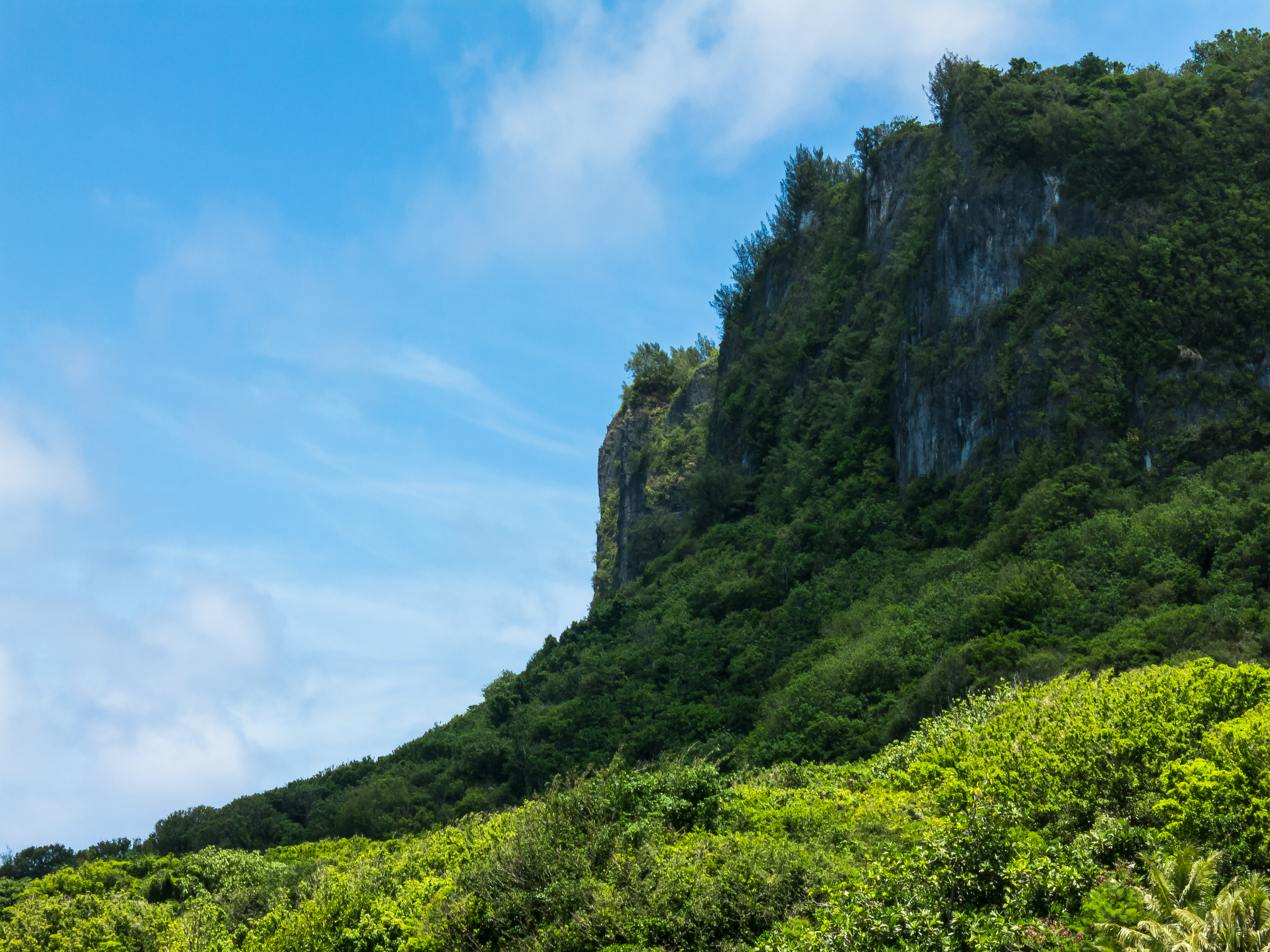
- Ritidian Point, the northernmost point on Guam, in the Guam National Wildlife Refuge

- Location of Yigo within the Territory of Guam.
- Country: United States
- Territory: Guam

Government
  - Mayor: Frances S. Lizama (D)
  - Vice Mayor: Pedro S. Blas (D)

Area
  - Total: 35 sq mi (91 km^{2})
- Elevation: 587 ft (179 m)

Population (2020)
  - Total: 19,339
- Time zone: UTC+10 (ChST)

Yigo (Chamorro: Yigu; Chamorro pronunciation: [d͡ʒiɡo]) is the northernmost village of the United States territory of Guam, and is the location of Andersen Air Force Base. The municipality of Yigo is the largest village on the island in terms of area. It contains a number of populated places, including Asatdas and Agafo Gumas.

== History ==
The origin of the name "Yigo" is contested. Some state that it is derived from the Spanish word yugo, meaning "yoke". However, some sources refer to the area as Asyigo, meaning "the home of the person Yigo." Any record of such a person has been lost.

Before contact with Europeans, Yigo had a large number of villages. Latte stone structure remnants around Mount Santa Rosa and Mataguac indicate significant populations. During the Spanish-Chamorro Wars of the late seventeenth century, settlements in Yigo included Hanom, Tarague, Hinapsan, and Upi (now Northwest Field). Hanom, in particular, was a critical refuge because of its freshwater spring. The August 1679 defeat of the CHamorus at Hanom by a force of Spaniards and their allies from Nisihan led by José de Quiroga y Losada was one of the fiercest battles of the conflict. Following the subjugation of the CHamoru, the much reduced population was relocated to six villages centered on churches in the center and south of the island. Northern areas, including Yigo, were open to hunters and fishermen but not settlement.

In the early nineteenth century, wealthy residents of Hagåtña began purchasing fertile land in Yigo for agricultural uses. The area became known for producing cocoa beans, used to make hot chocolate for Hagåtña residents, as well as coffee, avocado, citrus, and copra. Upi was an important center of cattle ranching, while copra plantations were located along the northern coast, in particular. Following the Spanish–American War and beginning of the American administration, some Chamorus began to permanently settle in the north. The first elementary school in the area opened in 1912 and, in 1919, the U.S. administration authorized 25-year land use permits in Yigo. Our Lady of Lourdes Chapel was constructed in 1920; previously, Yigo residents journeyed to Hagåtña for mass. The first village store was started in 1925. However, by 1940, Yigo remained sparsely populated with about 40 families.

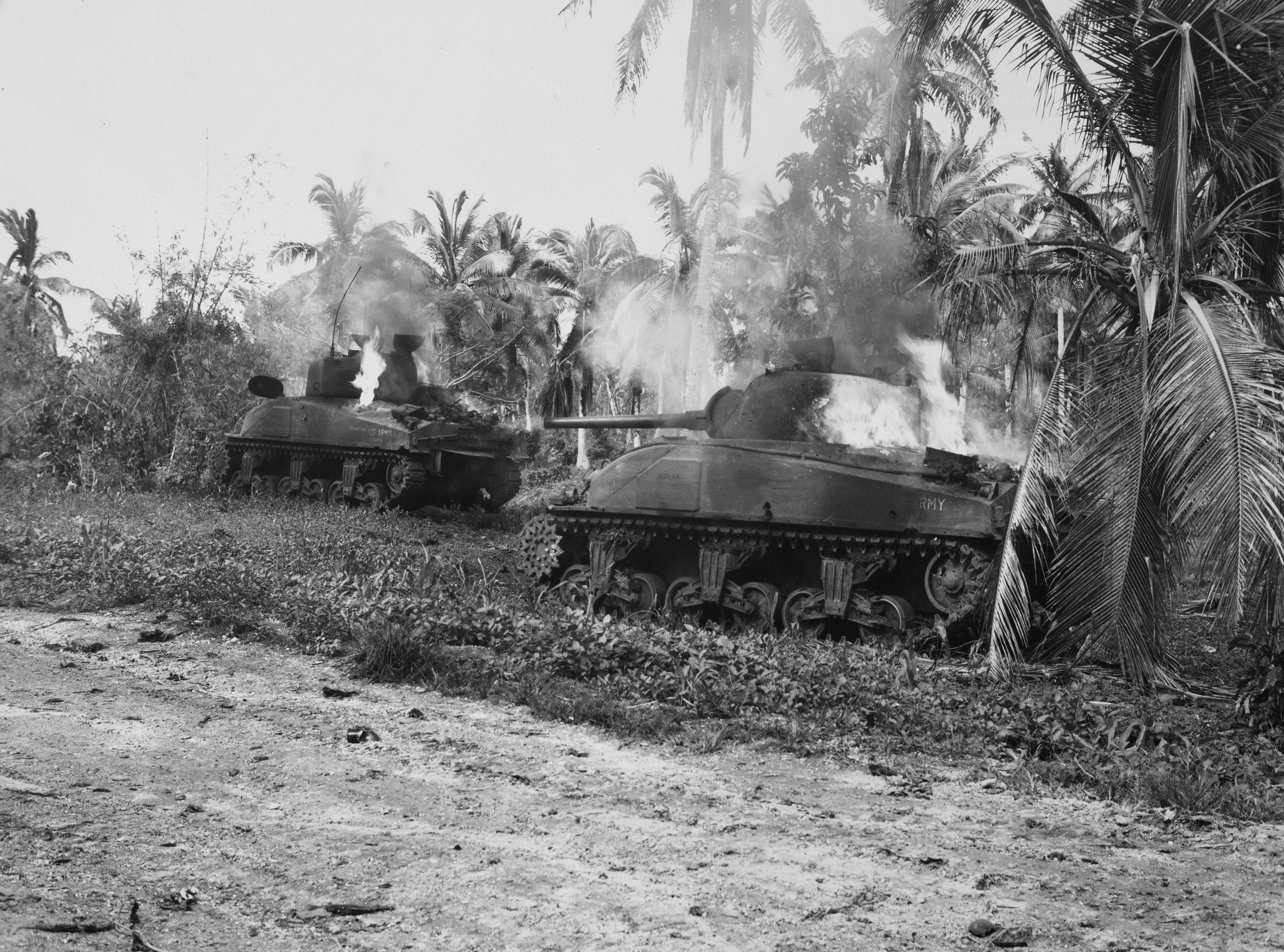
Burning U.S. tanks in Yigo during the Battle of Guam (1944)

During the Japanese occupation of Guam from 1941 to 1944, some Hagåtña residents moved to Yigo to get away from the occupying Japanese force. The village was the site of a concentration camp during Japanese occupation of the island. The final battle between Japanese and American forces during the Battle of Guam occurred in Yigo on August 7 and 8, 1944, resulting in the destruction of the chapel and many homes. The South Pacific Memorial Peace Park was built by the Japanese Government and is dedicated to the many Japanese and American soldiers who died in the battle of Guam.

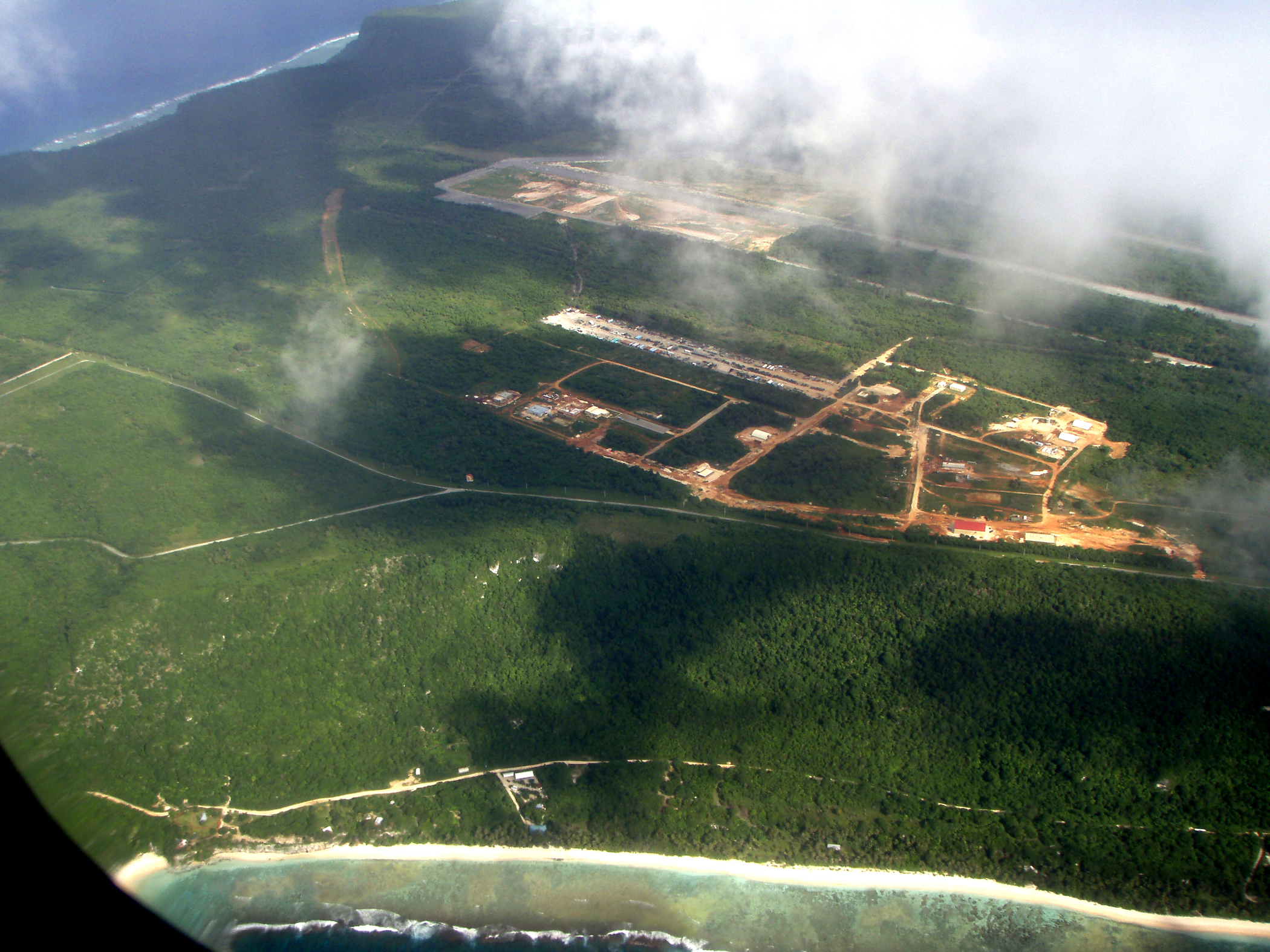
Northwest Field, an abandoned airfield constructed in 1944–45, is located on the site of the Spanish-era settlement of Upi

Following the war, the population of Yigo soared, first as it accommodated displaced persons from the south and then non-Chamorus who moved to Guam. The economy reoriented from agriculture towards the presence of Andersen Air Force Base and the population continued to grow with the construction of housing subdivisions throughout the village.

== Climate ==
Climate data for Andersen Air Force Base (1991-2020 normals)
Month	Jan	Feb	Mar	Apr	May	Jun	Jul	Aug	Sep	Oct	Nov	Dec	Year
Mean daily maximum °F (°C)	83.3 (28.5)	83.8 (28.8)	84.2 (29.0)	85.2 (29.6)	86.1 (30.1)	86.6 (30.3)	85.9 (29.9)	85.7 (29.8)	85.9 (29.9)	84.6 (29.2)	85.2 (29.6)	84.2 (29.0)	85.1 (29.5)
Daily mean °F (°C)	79.6 (26.4)	79.6 (26.4)	80.2 (26.8)	81.2 (27.3)	82.1 (27.8)	82.4 (28.0)	81.5 (27.5)	81.4 (27.4)	81.3 (27.4)	81.5 (27.5)	81.4 (27.4)	80.6 (27.0)	81.1 (27.2)
Mean daily minimum °F (°C)	75.8 (24.3)	75.5 (24.2)	76.2 (24.6)	77.2 (25.1)	78.1 (25.6)	78.2 (25.7)	77.2 (25.1)	77.0 (25.0)	76.8 (24.9)	77.3 (25.2)	77.6 (25.3)	76.9 (24.9)	77.0 (25.0)
Average precipitation inches (mm)	5.34 (136)	4.17 (106)	2.37 (60)	3.54 (90)	4.11 (104)	6.87 (174)	10.77 (274)	15.09 (383)	12.77 (324)	11.31 (287)	7.95 (202)	5.46 (139)	89.75 (2,279)
Average precipitation days (≥ 0.01 in)	18.9	16.8	16.6	16.0	18.8	22.5	24.8	24.9	23.7	23.6	22.2	20.8	249.6
Source: NOAA

== Government and infrastructure ==
The federal government of the United States owns portions of the land in Yigo; the Government of Guam stated that it was one of several villages that are "characterized primarily by the large proportion of land owned by the federal government".

== Education ==
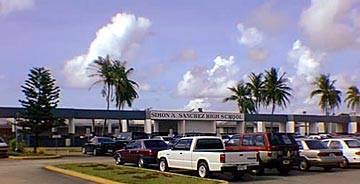
Simon Sanchez High School

Yigo, served by the Guam Department of Education, has several kindergarten through 5th grade elementary schools:

- Daniel L. Perez Elementary School (formerly Yigo Elementary School)
- Machananao Elementary School
- Upi Elementary School
- F.B. Leon Guerrero Middle School, formerly an elementary school until 1981, when it was converted into a middle school, and Simon Sanchez High School are in Yigo. Sanchez opened as a junior high school in 1974; the school became a high school in 1982 to serve north-eastern Guam.

Simon Sanchez became a high school in 1982. The first graduating class graduated in May 1983.

In regards to the Department of Defense Education Activity (DoDEA), Yigo is in the school transportation zone for Andersen Elementary and Andersen Middle School, while Guam High School is the island's sole DoDEA high school.

== Government ==
Commissioner of Yigo
Name	Term begin	Term end
Juan A. San Nicolas	1944	1945
Jesus C. Artero	1945	1948
Manuel A. Calvo	1948	1954
Juan M. Santos	1954	1957
Jose D. Perez	1957	1965
Juan G. Blas	1965	1968
Antonio A. Calvo	1968	1973

Mayor of Yigo
Name	Party	Term begin	Term end
Antonio A. Calvo	Republican	January 1, 1973	January 5, 1981
David G. Blas	Republican	January 5, 1981	September 6, 1988
Jesus P. Cruz (acting)	Republican	September 6, 1988	January 2, 1989
John F. Blas	Democratic	January 2, 1989	January 4, 1993
Edward C. Artero	Republican	January 4, 1993	January 6, 1997
Robert "Bob" S. Lizama	Democratic	January 6, 1997	January 7, 2013
Rudy M. Matanane	Republican	January 7, 2013	January 4, 2021
Anthony "Tony" P. Sanchez	Republican	January 4, 2021	January 4, 2025
Frances S. Lizama	Democratic	January 4, 2025	present

Vice Mayor of Yigo
Name	Party	Term begins	Term end
Ronald J. Flores	Democratic	January 5, 2009	January 7, 2013
Anthony "Tony" P. Sanchez	Republican	January 7, 2013	January 4, 2021
Loreto V. Leones	Republican	January 4, 2021	January 4, 2025
Pedro S. Blas	Democratic	January 6, 2025	present

== Demographics ==
Historical population
Census	Pop.	Note	%±
1960	7,682		—
1970	11,542		50.2%
1980	10,359		−10.2%
1990	14,213		37.2%
2000	19,474		37.0%
2010	20,539		5.5%
2020	19,339		−5.8%

The U.S. Census Bureau has the municipality in multiple census-designated places: Andersen Air Force Base, Anao, Chaguian, Mataguac, North Gayinero, and South Gayinero.

== See also ==
- Villages of Guam
