= Chris Barnett (politician) =

Guamanian politician and radio personality

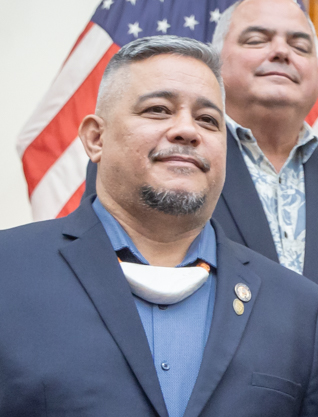
- Barnett in 2024

Member of the Guam Legislature
- Incumbent
- Assumed office January 2, 2023

Personal details
- Born: Darrel Christopher Barnett
- Party: Democratic

Darrel Christopher Barnett, also known as Chris Malafunkshun, is a Guamanian politician and radio personality. A member of the Democratic Party, he served in the Guam Legislature since 2023.
