= Vicente Ada =

Governor-elect of Guam

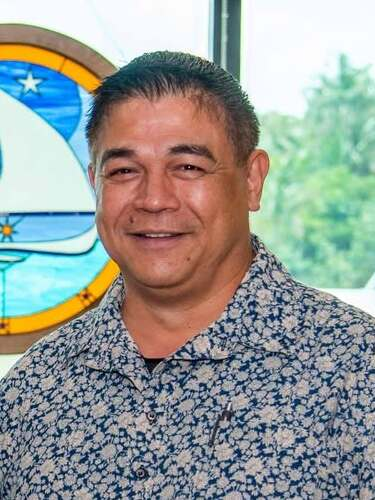
- Ada in 2025

Governor-elect of Guam
- Assuming office January 4, 2027
- Lieutenant: Edward Calvo (elect)
- Succeeding: Lou Leon Guerrero

Vice Speaker of the Guam Legislature
- Incumbent
- Assumed office January 6, 2025
- Preceded by: Tina Rose Muña Barnes

Minority Leader of the Guam Legislature
- In office January 7, 2013 – January 2, 2017
- Preceded by: Frank F. Blas Jr.
- Succeeded by: James Espaldon

Member of the Guam Legislature
- Incumbent
- Assumed office January 6, 2025
- In office January 4, 2021 – January 2, 2023
- In office January 2009 – January 2017

Personal details
- Born: Vicente Anthony Ada; 1966/1967 (age 58–59)
- Party: Republican
- Relatives: Ben Ada (father)
- Website: Legislature website Campaign website

Vicente Anthony "Tony" Ada (born 1966/1967) is a Guamanian politician who is the governor-elect of Guam. A member of the Republican Party, he has served in the Guam Legislature from 2009 to 2017, from 2021 to 2023 and since 2025.

He was the Republican nominee for lieutenant governor in the 2022 Guamanian gubernatorial election, running alongside former governor Felix Perez Camacho. Vicente Ada announced his run for governor in the 2026 election. He and his running mate Edward John Calvo defeated Frank F. Blas Jr. and Mary A.Y. Okada to win the Republican nomination. They defeated the Democratic ticket of Therese Terlaje and Sabina Perez in the general election.

Legislature of Guam
Preceded by Frank F. Blas Jr.	Minority Leader of the Guam Legislature; 2013–2017	Succeeded by James Espaldon
Preceded by Tina Rose Muña Barnes	Vice Speaker of the Guam Legislature; 2025–present	Incumbent
Party political offices
Preceded by Felix Camacho	Republican nominee for Governor of Guam; 2026	Most recent
Political offices
Preceded by Lou Leon Guerrero	Governor of Guam; Taking office 2027	Elect
