= Christopher M. Dueñas =

Guamanian politician

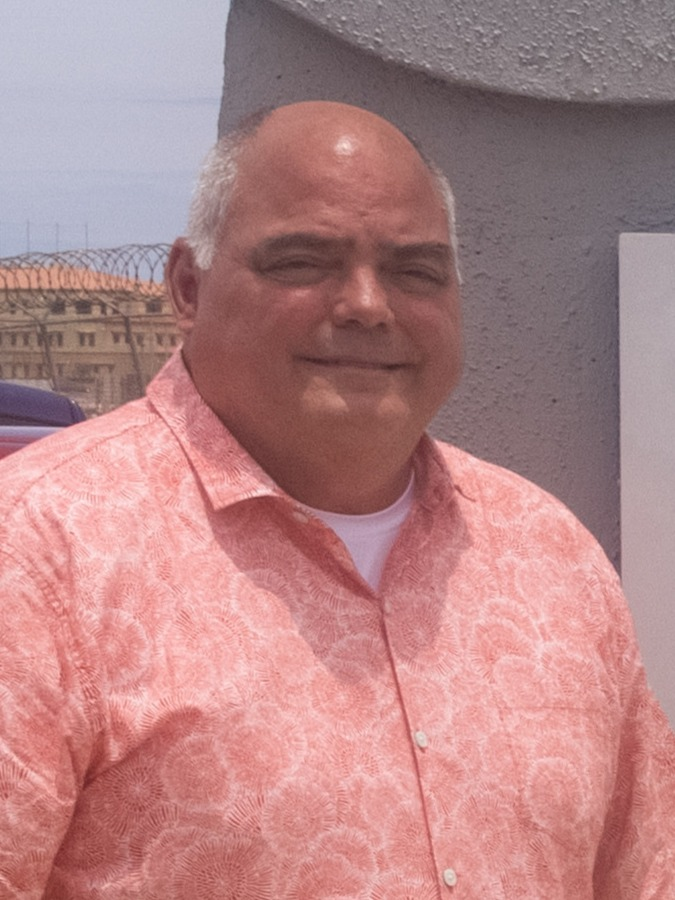

Member of the Guam Legislature
- Incumbent
- Assumed office January 4, 2021

Personal details
- Party: Republican

Christopher Michael Dueñas is a Guamanian politician. A member of the Republican, he served in the Guam Legislature since 2021.
