= 3rd Guam Legislature =

The 3rd Guam Legislature was a meeting of the Guam Legislature. It convened in Hagatna, Guam on January 3, 1955 and ended on January 7, 1957.

The 3rd Guam Legislature was elected in the 1954 Guamanian legislative election.

== Membership ==
Senator	Assumed office
James T. Sablan	1951
Vicente B. Bamba	1951
Edwardo T. Calvo	1951
Antonio B. Won Pat	1951
Carlos P. Taitano	1955
Francisco B. Leon Guerrero	1955
Lagrimas Untalan	1955
Felix T. Carbullido	1953
Antonio S.N. Duenas	1951
Manuel U. Lujan	1951
Antonio C. Cruz	1951
Adrian L. Cristobal	1953
Vicente C. Reyes	1955
Jesus C. Okiyama	1951
Cynthia Torres	1955
Pedro B. Leon Guerrero	1955
Frank D. Perez	1951
Joaquin A. Perez	1951
Joaquin C. "Kin" Arriola	1955
Baltazar J. Bordallo	1951
Florencio T. Ramirez	1951
