= 10th Guam Legislature =

The 10th Guam Legislature was a meeting of the Guam Legislature. It convened in Hagatna, Guam on January 6, 1969 and ended on January 4, 1971.

In the 1968 Guamanian general election, the Democratic Party of Guam won all twenty-one seats in the Guam Legislature.

== Party summary ==
Affiliation	Party (shading indicates majority caucus)		Total
Affiliation	Democratic	Republican	Total
End of previous legislature	21	0	21
Begin	21	0	21
Latest Voting share	100.0%	0.0%	
Beginning of the next legislature	15	6	21

== Membership ==
Senator	Party	Assumed office
Joaquin C. "Kin" Arriola	Democratic	1967
Ricardo J. Bordallo	Democratic	1957
George M. Bamba	Democratic	1957
Richard F. Taitano	Democratic	1967
Edward S. Terlaje	Democratic	1967
Florencio T. Ramirez	Democratic	1951
Jesus U. Torres	Democratic	1967
William D.L. Flores	Democratic	1957
Joaquin A. Perez	Democratic	1969
Leonard S.N. Paulino	Democratic	1967
Manuel U. Lujan	Democratic	1951
Antonio C. Cruz	Democratic	1967
Jesus C. Okiyama	Democratic	1967
James T. Sablan	Democratic	1969
Earl C. Conway	Democratic	1967
Oscar L. Delfin	Democratic	1967
Juan L. Anderson	Democratic	1969
Alfred S.N. Flores	Democratic	1967
Frank G. Lujan	Democratic	1963
Rafael C. Sgambelluri	Democratic	1967
Jose M. Acfalle	Democratic	1967
