= 6th Guam Legislature =

The 6th Guam Legislature was a meeting of the Guam Legislature. It convened in Hagatna, Guam on January 2, 1961 and ended on January 7, 1963.

The 6th Guam Legislature was elected in the 1960 Guamanian general election.

== Membership ==
Senator	Assumed office
Adrian L. Cristobal	1953
Manuel U. Lujan	1951
Antonio B. Won Pat	1951
Ricardo J. Bordallo	1957
Antonio C. Cruz	1951
William D.L. Flores	1957
Vicente B. Bamba	1951
Paul D. Palting	1959
Jesus C. Okiyama	1951
George M. Bamba	1957
James T. Sablan	1951
Juan Q. San Miguel	1957
Joaquin A. Perez	1951
Florencio T. Ramirez	1951
Juan L. Anderson	1959
Alfred S.N. Flores	1957
Pedro C. Lujan	1957
Jose A. Flores	1961
Jose C. Castro	1959
Jose P. Cruz	1961
Juan T.M. Toves	1961
