= 4th Guam Legislature =

The 4th Guam Legislature was a meeting of the Guam Legislature. It convened in Hagatna, Guam on January 7, 1957 and ended on January 5, 1959.

The 4th Guam Legislature was elected in the 1956 Guamanian legislative election.

== Membership ==
Senator	Assumed office
Joaquin C. "Kin" Arriola	1955
Vicente B. Bamba	1951
Adrian L. Cristobal	1953
Antonio B. Won Pat	1951
James T. Sablan	1951
Manuel U. Lujan	1951
Jesus C. Okiyama	1951
Antonio C. Cruz	1951
Ricardo J. Bordallo	1957
Joaquin A. Perez	1951
George M. Bamba	1957
Florencio T. Ramirez	1951
Juan M. Tuncap	1957
Tomas C. Ooka	1957
Pedro C. Lujan	1957
Juan Q. San Miguel	1957
William D.L. Flores	1957
Jose C. Nededog	1957
Alfred S.N. Flores	1957
Elias A. Chargualaf	1957
Manuel G. Sablan	1957
