= 12th Guam Legislature =

The 12th Guam Legislature was a meeting of the Guam Legislature. It convened in Hagatna, Guam on January 1, 1973 and ended on January 6, 1975, during the 3rd and 4th years of Carlos Camacho's elected Gubernatorial Term.

In the 1972 Guamanian general election, the Democratic Party of Guam won a fourteen-to-seven (14-7) supermajority of seats in the Guam Legislature.

== Party summary ==
Affiliation	Party (shading indicates majority caucus)		Total
Affiliation	Democratic	Republican	Total
End of previous legislature	15	6	21
Begin	14	7	21
Latest Voting share	66.7%	33.3%	
Beginning of the next legislature	9	12	21

== Membership ==
Senator	Party	Assumed office
Allen A. Sekt	Democratic	1971
Adrian L. Cristobal	Democratic	1971
George M. Bamba	Democratic	1957
Carl T.C. Gutierrez	Democratic	1973
Adrian C. Sanchez	Democratic	1971
Richard F. Taitano	Democratic	1973
Paul J. Bordallo	Democratic	1971
Jose R. "Ping" Duenas	Democratic	1971
Edward S. Terlaje	Democratic	1973
Florencio T. Ramirez	Democratic	1951
Francisco R. Santos	Democratic	1971
Frank G. Lujan	Democratic	1963
Jesus U. Torres	Democratic	1973
William D.L. Flores	Democratic	1957
Paul McDonald Calvo	Republican	1971
Antonio "Tony" M. Palomo	Republican	1973
Alfred C. Ysrael	Republican	1973
Jerry M. Rivera	Republican	1973
Joseph Franklin Ada	Republican	1973
G. Ricardo Salas	Republican	1973
Vicente "Ben" D. Ada	Republican	1971
