= 7th Guam Legislature =

The 7th Guam Legislature was a meeting of the Guam Legislature. It convened in Hagatna, Guam on January 7, 1963 and ended on January 4, 1965.

The 7th Guam Legislature was elected in the 1962 Guamanian general election.

== Membership ==
Senator	Assumed office
Antonio B. Won Pat	1951
Adrian L. Cristobal	1953
Ricardo J. Bordallo	1957
George M. Bamba	1957
Manuel U. Lujan	1951
William D.L. Flores	1957
Florencio T. Ramirez	1951
Vicente B. Bamba	1951
Edward S. Terlaje	1963
Paul D. Palting	1959
Juan L. Anderson	1959
Francisco G. "Frank" Lujan	1963
Joaquin Q. Sanchez	1963
Jesus C. Okiyama	1963
Jesus U. Torres	1963
Alfred S.N. Flores	1957
Felix C. Wusstig	1963
Cayetano A. Quinata	1963
Jesus C. Santos	1963
Juan T.M. Toves	1961
Jose M. Acfalle	1963
