= 1st Guam Legislature =

The 1st Guam Legislature was a meeting of the Guam Legislature. It convened in Hagatna, Guam on January 5, 1951, and ended on January 3, 1953.

The 1st Guam Legislature was elected in the 1950 Guamanian legislative election.

== Leadership ==
=== Legislative ===
- Speaker: Antonio Won Pat
- Vice Speaker: Frank D. Perez
- Legislative Secretary: Dorothea San Nicolas
- Sergeant-at-Arms: Jose Blas
- Executive Secretary: Maria Duenas

== Membership ==
Senator
Vicente B. Bamba
Baltazar J. Bordallo
Edwardo T. Calvo
Antonio C. Cruz
Antonio S.N. Duenas
Leon D. Flores
Manuel F.L. Guerrero
Jose D. Leon Guerrero
Francisco B. Leon Guerrero
Pedro B. Leon Guerrero
Manuel U. Lujan
Jesus C. Okiyama
Frank D. Perez
Joaquin A. Perez
Joaquin C. Perez
Jesus R. Quinene
Ignacio P. Quitugua
Florencio T. Ramirez
James T. Sablan
Joaquin S. Santos
Antonio B. Won Pat
