= 5th Guam Legislature =

The 5th Guam Legislature was a meeting of the Guam Legislature. It convened in Hagatna, Guam on January 5, 1959 and ended on January 2, 1961.

The 5th Guam Legislature was elected in the 1958 Guamanian general election.

== Membership ==
Senator	Assumed office
Adrian L. Cristobal	1953
Antonio B. Won Pat	1951
Vicente B. Bamba	1951
Manuel U. Lujan	1951
Ricardo J. Bordallo	1957
Antonio C. Cruz	1951
Jesus C. Okiyama	1951
Florencio T. Ramirez	1951
George M. Bamba	1957
Joaquin A. Perez	1951
James T. Sablan	1951
William D.L. Flores	1957
Juan Q. San Miguel	1957
Paul D. Palting	1959
Tomas C. Ooka	1957
Pedro C. Lujan	1957
Alfred S.N. Flores	1957
Juan L. "John" Anderson	1959
Manuel F. Ulloa	1959
Jose C. Castro	1959
Alfred Ching	1959
