= 11th Guam Legislature =

The 11th Guam Legislature was a meeting of the Guam Legislature. It convened in Hagatna, Guam on January 4, 1971 and ended on January 1, 1973, during the 1st and 2nd years of Carlos Camacho's elected Gubernatorial Term.

In the 1970 Guamanian general election, the Democratic Party of Guam won a fifteen-to-six (15-6) supermajority of seats in the Guam Legislature.

== Party summary ==
Affiliation	Party (shading indicates majority caucus)		Total
Affiliation	Democratic	Republican	Total
End of previous legislature	21	0	21
Begin	15	6	21
Latest Voting share	71.4%	28.6%	
Beginning of the next legislature	14	7	21

== Membership ==
Senator	Party	Assumed office
George M. Bamba	Democratic	1957
Adrian L. Cristobal	Democratic	1971
Adrian C. Sanchez	Democratic	1971
Jose R. "Ping" Duenas	Democratic	1971
Frank G. Lujan	Democratic	1963
Florencio T. Ramirez	Democratic	1951
Francisco R. Santos	Democratic	1971
Allen A. Sekt	Democratic	1971
William D.L. Flores	Democratic	1957
Joaquin A. Perez	Democratic	1969
Leonard S.N. Paulino	Democratic	1967
Paul J. Bordallo	Democratic	1971
James B. Butler	Democratic	1971
Tomas Charfauros	Democratic	1971
Oscar L. Delfin	Democratic	1967
Paul McDonald Calvo	Republican	1971
Tomas Santos Tanaka	Republican	1971
Concepcion C. Barrett	Republican	1971
Vicente "Ben" D. Ada	Republican	1971
Pedro "Pete" D. Perez	Republican	1971
Tomas R. Santos	Republican	1971
