= 2nd Guam Legislature =

The 2nd Guam Legislature was a meeting of the Guam Legislature. It convened in Hagatna, Guam on January 5, 1953 and ended on January 3, 1955.

The 2nd Guam Legislature was elected in the 1952 Guamanian general election.

== Membership ==
Senator	Assumed office
Edwardo T. Calvo	1951
Vicente B. Bamba	1951
Frank D. Perez	1951
Antonio C. Cruz	1951
Manuel U. Lujan	1951
Manuel F.L. Guerrero	1951
Felix T. Carbullido	1953
Joaquin A. Perez	1951
Antonio B. Won Pat	1951
Antonio S.N. Duenas	1951
Florencio T. Ramirez	1951
Baltazar J. Bordallo	1951
Jesus C. Okiyama	1951
Paul D. Palting	1953
James T. Sablan	1951
Adrian L. Cristobal	1953
Joaquin S. Santos	1951
James B. Butler	1953
Pedro C. Lujan	1953
Gregorio D. Perez	1953
Jesus R. Quinene	1951
