= 8th Guam Legislature =

The 8th Guam Legislature was a meeting of the Guam Legislature. It convened in Hagatna, Guam on January 4, 1965, and ended on January 2, 1967.

The 8th Guam Legislature was elected in the 1964 Guamanian general election.

== Membership ==
Senator	Assumed office
Paul McDonald Calvo	1965
Vicente C. Reyes	1965
Carlos P. Taitano	1965
Antonio B. Won Pat	1951
Ricardo J. Bordallo	1957
G. Ricardo Salas	1965
George M. Bamba	1957
Carlos Camacho	1965
Francisco P. Perez	1965
Carlos P. Bordallo	1965
Tomas S. Tanaka	1965
Antonio S.N. Duenas	1965
William D.L. Flores	1957
Manuel U. Lujan	1951
Raymond F. Underwood	1965
Florencio T. Ramirez	1951
Tomas R. Santos	1965
Alberto T. Lamorena	1965
Francisco G. "Frank" Lujan	1963
Kurt S. Moylan	1965
Juan Muna	1965
