= 1950 Guamanian legislative election =

Parliamentary elections were held in Guam on 7 November 1950.

== Background ==
Following the controversy of the Guam Congress Walkout in March 1949, the United States Congress passed the Guam Organic Act of 1950 on 23 May 1950, creating a 21-member Congress.

== Electoral system ==
The 21 members were elected from a single district, with the candidates receiving the most votes being elected. Candidates were required to be at least 25 years old and have lived in Guam for at least five years before the election.

== Results ==
Voter turnout was around 65%.

=== Elected members ===
Vicente B. Bamba
Baltazar J. Bordallo
Eduardo Torres Calvo
Antonio C. Cruz
Antonio S.N. Duenas
Leon D. Flores
Jose D. Leon Guerrero
Manuel F. Leon Guerrero
Francisco B. Leon Guerrero
Pedro B. Leon Guerrero
Manuel U. Lujan
Jesus C. Okiyama
Frank D. Perez
Joaquin A. Perez
Joaquin C. Perez
Jesus R. Quinene
Ignacio P. Quitugua
Florencio T. Ramirez
James T. Sablan
Joaquin S. Santos
Antonio Borja Won Pat
Source: Guampedia

== Aftermath ==
Following the elections, Antonio Borja Won Pat was elected Speaker. The legislature was originally known as the Eleventh Guam Congress, but one of its first acts was to rename the Congress the Legislature, becoming the First Legislature.

== See also ==
- 1st Guam Legislature
