= Antoinette D. Sanford =

Guamanian businesswoman and politician

Senator of the Guam Legislature
- In office January 6, 2003 – January 3, 2005

Personal details
- Born: Guam
- Party: Democratic
- Spouse: Dave Sanford
- Children: 3
- Education: University of Guam, American InterContinental University
- Occupation: Businesswoman, Politician
- Other names: Antoinette Sanford, Tony Sanford, Antoinette Untalan Pangelinan Sanford, Antoinette (Tony) Untalan Pangelinan Sanford, Toni Sanford

Antoinette D. Sanford is a Guamanian businesswoman and politician. Sanford is a former Democratic senator in the Guam Legislature.

== Early life ==
Sanford was born in Guam. Sanford's father was Juan Lujan Pangelinan (1922-2009). Sanford's mother is Dolores Haniu Untalan. Sanford has three brothers and three sisters. In 1968, Sanford graduated from Academy of Our Lady of Guam, an all-girls Catholic high school.

== Education ==
In 1972, Sanford earned a Bachelor of Arts degree in Business Management with minors in Accounting and Psychology from University of Guam. In 2008, Sanford earned an MBA degree in Accounting and Finance from American InterContinental University.

== Career ==
As a businesswoman, Sanford is the president and co-founder of Sanford Technology Group, LLC (STG) (formerly A-D Sandford & Co), a computer services business.

In September 2013, Sanford became a founding member of Guam Women's Chamber of Commerce.

On November 5, 2002, Sanford won the election and became a Democratic senator in the Guam Legislature. Sanford began her term on January 6, 2003, in the 27th Guam Legislature.

In 2018, Sanford was elected as Chairperson of University of Guam Board of Regents.

== Awards ==
- 1993 Guam Business News Executive of the Year.
- 2014 Guam Business Magazine Businesswoman of the Year Lifetime Achievement Award. Presented at the ninth annual Businesswoman of the Year Maga’haga award program. Sponsored by First Hawaiian Bank and Guam Business Magazine. April 26, 2014.

== Personal life ==
Sanford's full name is Antoinette (Tony) Untalan Pangelinan Sanford. Sanford's husband is Dave Sanford. They have three sons.
