= Joaquín Pérez =

Joaquín Pérez may refer to:

- Joaquín Pérez (equestrian) (1936–2011), Mexican equestrian rider
- Joaquín Pérez (rower) (born 1937), Cuban rower
- Joaquín Pérez (footballer) (born 2000), Argentine footballer
- Joaquin A. Perez (1916–1984), Guam politician
