= Carmen Fernandez =

Guamanian businesswoman, politician, and college administrator

Senator of the Guam Legislature
- In office January 6, 2003 – January 3, 2005

President of Northern Marianas College
- In office May 2007 – April 2010 (fired)
- In office October 2016 – August 2018

Personal details
- Party: Democratic
- Education: University of Guam
- Other names: Carmen F. Fernandez, Carmen Frances Fernandez

Carmen Fernandez is a Guamanian businesswoman, politician, and college administrator. Fernandez is a former Democratic senator in the Guam Legislature. She was formerly President of Northern Marianas College.

== Early life and education ==
Fernandez was born in Yona, Guam. Fernandez' father was Ignacio Taijeron Reyes. Fernandez' mother was Annie Frances Fernandez Cruz. In 1981, Fernandez graduated from George Washington High School in Mangilao, Guam.

In 1985, Fernandez earned a bachelor's degree in business management from the University of Guam. In 1988, Fernandez earned an MBA degree from the University of Guam.

== Career ==
In January 1998, Fernandez became Vice President of Administration & Finance at University of Guam.

On November 5, 2002, Fernandez won the Senatorial election and became a Democratic senator in the Guam Legislature. Fernandez began her term on January 6, 2003, in the 27th Guam Legislature.

As a businesswoman, Fernandez is the owner of Imperial Pacific International (IPI) in the Commonwealth of the Northern Mariana Islands. It operates Saipan's casinos.

In May 2007, Fernandez became President of Northern Marianas College. She replaced Acting President Danny Wyatt, who returned to his role as Dean for Academic Programs and Services. In April 2010, Fernandez was fired from her position as President of Northern Marianas College. Fernandez was succeeded by Lorraine Cabrera as the interim President.

In October 2016, Fernandez was named President of Northern Marianas College. In February 2018, Fernandez launched the casino management to Northern Marianas College’s workforce development programs. Fernandez's ownership of Imperial Pacific International (CNMI) LLC was not publicly known.

In August 2018, Fernandez resigned as President of Northern Marianas College. Frankie Eliptico was appointed the interim president.

== See also ==
- Michael San Nicolas - U.S. House of Representatives delegate for Guam's at-large congressional district (2019-2023) who was chief of staff for Fernandez during 27th Guam Legislature
