= Lagrimas Untalan =

Guamanian educator and politician (1911–1997)

Member of the Legislature
- In office 1954–1956

Personal details
- Born: 1911; Hagåtña, Guam
- Died: 1997 (aged 85–86)

Lagrimas Leon Guerrero Untalan (1911–1997) was a Guamanian educator and politician. She served as a member of the Legislature of Guam between 1954 and 1956.

== Biography ==
Untalan was born Lagrimas Pereira Leon Guerrero in Hagåtña in 1911, the youngest of seven children of Mariana and Francisco Leon Guerrero. After leaving school she became a teacher, a job in which she pushed for greater use of the Chamorro language in education. During her career she assisted the Fijian educational authorities with developing its curriculum. She also translated Stand Ye Guamanians into Chamorro. She married a fellow teacher Luis Palomo Untalan in 1950. Their son Ramon died in infancy, after which the couple adopted two children.

In the 1954 elections for the Guamanian Legislature she ran on an independent ticket alongside Cynthia Torres and Carlos Taitano. Their campaign meetings saw female attendees pelted with eggs and accused of prostitution. However, all three were elected, with Untalan finishing seventh and Torres fifteenth. In 1956 she was one of the founders of the Territorial Party.

Untalan retired from teaching in 1970, after which she continued her community work. She died in 1997.
