= Untalan =

Untalan is a surname. Notable people with the surname include:

- Cathy Untalan (born 1985), Filipina environmentalist and beauty queen
- Lagrimas Untalan (1911–1997), Guamanian educator and politician
