= Senator Arriola =

Senator Arriola may refer to:

- Elizabeth P. Arriola (1928–2002), Senate of Guam
- Joaquin C. Arriola (1925–2022), Senate of Guam
