= Senator Torres =

Senator Torres may refer to:

- Aníbal José Torres (fl. 2000s–2010s), Senate of Puerto Rico
- Art Torres (born 1946), California State Senate
- Carlos J. Torres Torres (born 1967), Senate of Puerto Rico
- Cynthia Torres (1911–2001), Senate of Guam
- Nikki Torres (fl. 2020s), Washington State Senate
- Norma Torres (born 1965), California State Senate
- Ralph Torres (born 1979), Senate of the Northern Mariana Islands
- Vic Torres (born 1947), Florida State Senate
