= Senator Flores =

Senator Flores may refer to:

- Alfred Flores (1916–2009), Senate of Guam
- Anitere Flores (born 1976), Florida State Senate
- Edgar Flores (politician) (born 1986), Nevada State Senate
- Pete Flores (born 1960), Texas State Senate

== See also ==
- Dean Florez (born 1963), California State Senate
