= Senator Perez =

Senator Perez may refer to:

- Aníbal Marrero Pérez (1949–2005), Senate of Puerto Rico
- Joaquin A. Perez (1916–1984), Senate of Guam
