= Senator Quitugua =

Senator Quitugua may refer to:

- Franklin Quitugua (1933–2015), Guam Senate
- Ignacio P. Quitugua (1909–1973), Guam Senate
