= 27th Guam Legislature =

The 27th Guam Legislature was a meeting of the Guam Legislature. It convened in Hagatna, Guam on January 6, 2003, and ended on January 3, 2005, during the 1st and 2nd years of Felix P. Camacho's 1st Gubernatorial Term.

In the 2002 Guamanian general election, the Democratic Party of Guam won a nine-to-six (9–6) majority of seats in the Guam Legislature.

== Leadership ==
=== Legislative ===
- Speaker: Vicente C. Pangelinan
- Vice Speaker: Frank B. Aguon Jr.
- Legislative Secretary: Tina Muña Barnes

=== Majority (Democratic) ===
- Majority Leader: Lou Leon Guerrero
- Assistant Majority Leader: Antoinette "Toni" Sanford
- Majority Whip: Dr. Carmen Fernandez
- Assistant Majority Whip: John M. "JQ" Quinata

=== Minority (Republican) ===
- Minority Leader: Mark Forbes
- Assistant Minority Leader: Joanne M. Salas Brown
- Minority Whip: Lawrence F. Kasperbauer
- Assistant Minority Whip: Jesse Anderson Lujan

== Party summary ==
| Affiliation | Party (shading indicates majority caucus) | | Total | Vacant |
| Affiliation | Democratic | Republican | Total | Vacant |
|---|---|---|---|---|
| End of previous legislature | 7 | 8 | 15 | 0 |
| Begin | 9 | 6 | 15 | 0 |
| Latest Voting share | 60.0% | 40.0% | | |
| Beginning of the next legislature | 6 | 9 | 15 | 0 |

== Membership ==
The following is a list of senators in the current Guam Legislature.

| Representative | Party | Assumed office |
|---|---|---|
| Vicente C. "Ben" Pangelinan | Democratic | 1993 |
| Frank B. Aguon Jr. | Democratic | 1997 |
| Lourdes A. Leon Guerrero | Democratic | 2001 |
| Rory J. Respicio | Democratic | 2003 |
| Tina Rose Muna Barnes | Democratic | 2003 |
| Carmen Fernandez | Democratic | 2003 |
| Antoinette "Toni" Sanford | Democratic | 2003 |
| John M. Quinata | Democratic | 2003 |
| F. Randall Cunliffe | Democratic | 2003 |
| Mark Forbes | Republican | 1995 |
| Joanne M. Salas Brown | Republican | 1995 |
| Lawrence "Larry" Kasperbauer | Republican | 1997 |
| Ray Tenorio | Republican | 2003 |
| Jesse A. Lujan | Republican | 2003 |
| Robert "Bob" Klitzkie | Republican | 2003 |
