= 1996 Guamanian referendum =

Guamanian ballot measures

A series of four referendums on casinos and senators was held in Guam on 5 November 1996. A reduction of the number of senators from 21 to 15 passed, but proposed term limits for senators failed. Voters approved a measure limiting the budget for parliamentary business to 2.5% of the national budget, and rejected a proposal to permit casinos to open on the island.

== Results ==
Question	For		Against		Invalid/ blank	Total votes	Registered voters	Turnout	Outcome
Question	Votes	%	Votes	%	Invalid/ blank	Total votes	Registered voters	Turnout	Outcome
Reduced number of Senators	25,124	68.61	11,495	31.39	5,600	42,219	55,319	76.32	Approved
Allowing casinos	9,509	25.49	27,801	74.51	4,909	42,219	55,319	76.32	Rejected
Limiting budget for parliamentary business	27,240	78.56	7,435	21.44	7,544	42,219	55,319	76.32	Approved
Senatorial terms increased from two to four years	14,565	41.84	20,243	58.16	7,411	42,219	55,319	76.32	Rejected
Source: Direct Democracy
