= Senator Lujan (disambiguation) =

Ben Ray Luján (born 1972) is a U.S. Senator from New Mexico since 2021. Senator Lujan (or Luján) may also refer to:

- David Lujan (born 1965), Arizona State Senate
- Manuel U. Lujan (1912–1975), Senate of Guam
- Pilar C. Lujan (fl. 1980s–present), Senate of Guam
