= Vicente T. Blaz =

United States Marine Corps general

Ben Blaz
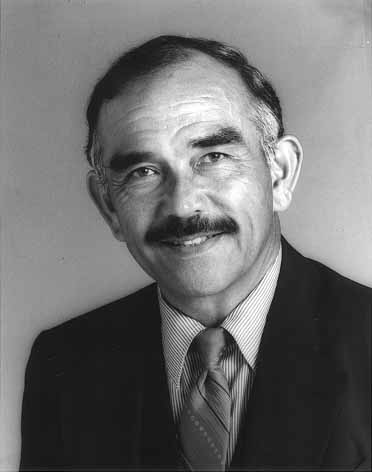

Delegate to the U.S. House of Representatives from Guam's at-large district
- In office January 3, 1985 – January 3, 1993
- Preceded by: Antonio Won Pat
- Succeeded by: Robert A. Underwood

Personal details
- Born: Vincente Tomás Garrido Blaz; February 14, 1928 Agana, Guam, U.S. (now Hagåtña)
- Died: January 8, 2014 (aged 85) Fairfax, Virginia, U.S.
- Resting place: Arlington National Cemetery
- Party: Republican
- Spouse: Ann Evers
- Children: 2
- Relatives: Tony Blaz (nephew)
- Education: University of Notre Dame (BA); George Washington University (MA)

Military service
- Allegiance: United States of America
- Branch/service: United States Marine Corps
- Years of service: 1951–1980
- Rank: Brigadier General
- Commands: 9th Marine Regiment
- Battles/wars: Vietnam War
- Awards: Legion of Merit; Bronze Star

Vincente Tomás Garrido Blaz (February 14, 1928 – January 8, 2014), also known as Ben Blaz, was a Chamorro United States Marine Corps Brigadier General from the United States territory of Guam. Blaz served in the Marine Corps from 1951 until July 1, 1980. Prior to his retirement, he served as the Deputy Chief of Staff for Reserve Affairs, Headquarters Marine Corps, Washington, D.C.

Blaz was elected the delegate to Congress from Guam in 1984 as a Republican. He served in the U.S. House of Representatives from 1985 until 1993.

== Early life and education ==
Vincente Tomás Garrido Blaz was born on February 14, 1928, in Agana, Guam with his father Vicente "Dero" Cruz Blaz and his mother Rita Pangelinan Garrido. Some sources state that he is from Sumay. His siblings are Rosario Blaz Cruz, Maria Blaz, Emilia Blaz Rios, Alfred Gregorio G. Blaz, Joaquin G. Blaz, Patricia Blaz Borja and Frank G. Blaz. He was living on the island during the three years of Japanese occupation during World War II. During the occupation he was forced to work in labor battalions building aviation fields and planting rice.

In 1947, he was awarded a scholarship to the University of Notre Dame. He graduated in 1951 from Notre Dame with a Bachelor of Science degree.

== Marine Corps career ==
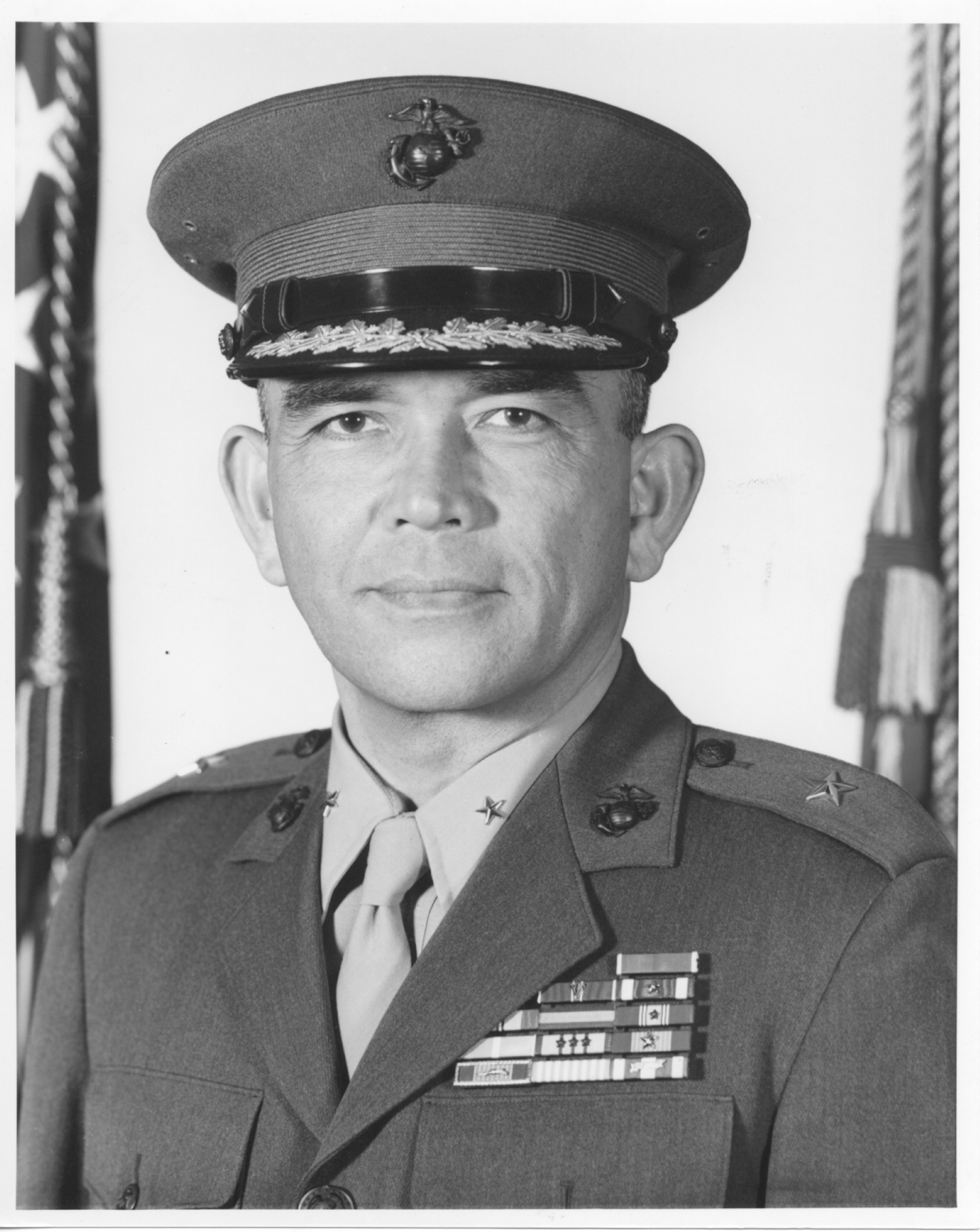
Blaz as a Marine

At the beginning of the Korean War, Blaz joined the Marine Corps Reserve; after graduating from Notre Dame, he attended Officer Candidate School. He was commissioned as a second lieutenant in the United States Marine Corps after graduation, and served in Japan during the war. He subsequently attended George Washington University, Washington, D.C., where he received a Master of Arts degree in 1963.

Service schools Blaz attended include the Navy's School of Naval Justice for legal officers, Newport, Rhode Island; the Army's Artillery and Guided Missile School, Fort Sill, Oklahoma; the Marine Corps Command and Staff College, Quantico, Virginia; and, the Naval War College, Newport, Rhode Island, where he was designated a Distinguished Graduate. His thesis, The Cross of Micronesia, was published in the Naval War College Review and entered verbatim in the Congressional Record in August 1971.

General Blaz served in a variety of command and staff billets throughout the Marine Corps, highlighted in 1972 by his assignment as Commanding Officer, 9th Marine Regiment, which was one of the major units involved in the liberation of his native Guam during World War II.

From September 1972 to August 1975, General Blaz served as Chief, United Nations and Maritime Matters Branch, International Negotiations Division, Organization of the Joint Chiefs of Staff, Washington, D.C. In this assignment, he represented the Joint Chiefs of Staff on U.S. Delegations to several international multi-lateral negotiations in Helsinki (Conference on Security and Cooperation in Europe) and Geneva (Law of War) and was an action officer on Law of the Sea matters.

In December 1974, the University of Guam conferred the degree of Doctor of Laws on General Blaz.

Blaz retired from the Marine Corps with the rank of brigadier general in 1980. As of February 2010 Blaz is the highest ranked Chamorro to have served in the Marine Corps. He was a professor at the University of Guam, and was then elected as a Republican to the House in 1984.

== Delegate, U.S. Congress ==
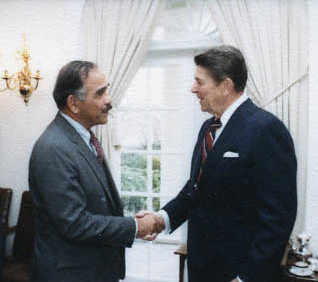
Blaz meeting President Ronald Reagan in December 1984

He ran for Congress in 1982 and came up short against political legend Antonio Borja Won Pat. Under the slogan "Right Man, Right Now," Blaz defeated Won Pat in a rematch in 1984. He went to Congress as a Republican freshman and he was elected President of his class. He joined the Armed Services, Resources and Foreign Affairs Committees where he quickly established a reputation for a strong national defense and a strong commitment to the political development of Guam and the surrounding region. He established strong relationships and demonstrated a rhetorical style that resonated for years.

In hearings on the status of Micronesia, he admonished the Bush administration representatives that "we are guardians, not guards of Micronesia." In response to a New York Times editorial supporting statehood for the District of Columbia, Blaz took the opportunity to explain Guam's situation. He ended his plea for dignity and recognition for Guam by stating "We are equal in war, but not in peace."

These words have been used by subsequent Delegates from Guam as well as the other territories whenever matters of political development are raised. In spite of misgivings and his effort to point out the realities of Washington politics, Blaz faithfully introduced the Guam Commonwealth bill twice and advanced the cause of the return of excess lands and war reparations. His successors built upon these efforts.

Blaz was the second Chamorro to serve in the U.S. House of Representatives. He served on the Armed Services, the Interior and Insular Affairs Committees, and the Select Committee on Aging. During his first term, in the 99th United States Congress, he introduced legislation — the Veterans' Educational Assistance Act — to expand eligibility under the G.I. Bill.

Democrat Robert A. Underwood defeated Blaz in the November 1992 election. Blaz then retired to Ordot, Guam.

== Death ==
Blaz died on January 8, 2014, in Fairfax, Virginia, of acute respiratory failure, he was 85. He was buried at the Arlington National Cemetery in Virginia.

== Awards and honors ==
Blaz's military awards include:

Legion of Merit	Bronze Star w/ valor device	Navy and Marine Corps Commendation Medal w/ 1 award star	Combat Action Ribbon	Office of the Joint Chiefs of Staff Identification Badge
Navy Presidential Unit Citation	National Defense Service Medal w/ 1 service star	Korean Service Medal	Vietnam Service Medal w/ 3 service stars	Office of the Joint Chiefs of Staff Identification Badge
Vietnam Gallantry Cross w/ gold star	Vietnam Gallantry Cross unit citation	United Nations Korea Medal	Vietnam Campaign Medal	Office of the Joint Chiefs of Staff Identification Badge

In 1988, Blaz was honored by his alma mater, when the Notre Dame Alumni Association presented him with the Corby Award, which honors alumni who have distinguished themselves in military service.

Blaz is the namesake of Marine Corps Base Camp Blaz, a military installation in Dededo that was activated in October 2020.

== See also ==
- List of Asian Americans and Pacific Islands Americans in the United States Congress

== Notes ==
U.S. House of Representatives
Preceded by Antonio Won Pat	Delegate to the U.S. House of Representatives from Guam's at-large congressional district 1985–1993	Succeeded by Robert A. Underwood
