= Northern Marianas College =

Public college in the Northern Mariana Islands

- Type: Public land-grant college
- Established: 1981
- President: Galvin S. Deleon Guerrero
- Location: Saipan, Northern Mariana Islands
- Campus: 14 acres
- Colors
- Website: Marianas.edu

Northern Marianas College (NMC) is a public land-grant college in the United States Commonwealth of the Northern Mariana Islands (CNMI). The college was founded in Susupe in 1976. NMC today has three campuses on the islands of Saipan, Tinian, and Rota. The main campus on Saipan is in Fina Sisu. NMC is the sole public college within the Commonwealth and is accredited by the Senior College and University Commission of the Western Association of Schools and Colleges.

== History ==
CNMI Governor Carlos S. Camacho created the college as an official governmental entity through Executive Order #25. The Executive Order established the college as one of the divisions within the Commonwealth Department of Education.

Northern Marianas Community College was founded in 1976. The college was established in May 1981. By mid-summer of 1981, the College was offering training programs for government employees and teachers of the CNMI Public School System. In January 1983, Public Law 3-43 established NMC as a public, nonprofit corporation having the Board of Education as its governing board. In March 1985, Public Law 4-34 amended the Higher Education Act of 1983 by creating a separate Board of Regents and broadening the authority and responsibility of the governing board. In June 1985, NMC received its initial accreditation from the Accrediting Commission for Community and Junior Colleges (ACCJC) of the Western Association of Schools and Colleges (WASC). That accreditation was reaffirmed in 1990, 1996, and 2001. In March 2001, the Accrediting Commission for Senior Colleges & Universities of WASC granted NMC initial accreditation for offering a Bachelor of Science degree in Elementary Education.

In March 1999, President Agnes McPhetres delivered the first State of the College Address.

== Leadership ==
In May 2007, Carmen Fernandez became President of Northern Marianas College. She replaced Acting President Danny Wyatt, who will return as Dean for Academic Programs and Services.

In April 2010, Carmen Fernandez was fired from her position as President of NMC for unauthorized changing of students’ grades. Lorraine Cabrera became an interim President.

Since Feb 2016, Sharon Hart was on leave of absence. In June 2016, Sharon Hart's term as President expired. David Attao served as interim President.

In October 2016, Carmen Fernandez was named President. In August 2018, Carmen Fernandez resigned as President. Frankie Eliptico was appointed as interim president.

In July 2021, Galvin S. Deleon Guerrero became the college's President.

== Academics ==
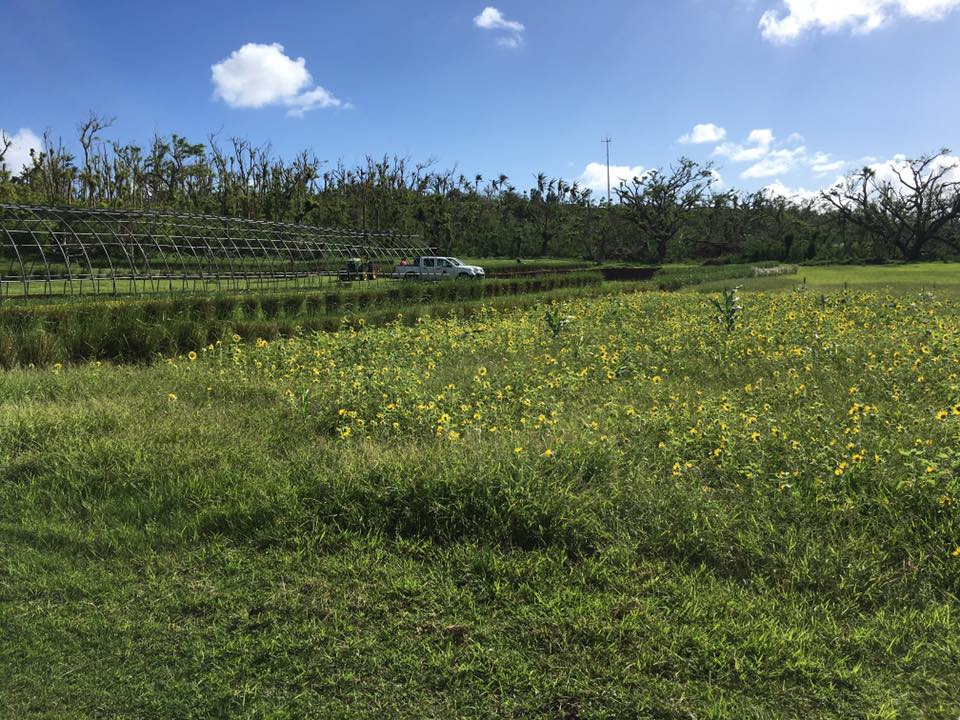
Laboratory sunflower field on Saipan operated by the college's CREES Agriculture Production Program

The Northern Marianas College academic instruction is maintained by the following departments:

- Business (Associate degree and four-year Bachelors program)
- Languages and Humanities
- Liberal Arts
- Nursing
- School of Education (Associate and Bachelors program)
- Sciences, Mathematics, Health, and Athletics
- Social Sciences and Fine Arts
- Criminal Justice

Northern Marianas College established the Rota Instructional Site to provide post-secondary, continuing, and adult education and training opportunities for the purpose of improving the quality of life for the people of Rota.

Since its inception in August 1986, the Rota Instructional Site has assisted many people who chose to pursue college education locally over the high cost of post-secondary education elsewhere. Many students have obtained a Certificate of Completion, an associate degree, or the Bachelor of Science degree in Elementary Education.

The College had also played a pivotal roles through its courses on cinematography to develop a cinema of Northern Mariana Islands.

== Notable alumni ==
- Theresa H. Arriola

== See also ==
- Education in the Northern Mariana Islands
