= 1952 Guamanian legislative election =

Parliamentary elections were held in Guam in 1952.

== Electoral system ==
The 21 members of the Legislature were elected from a single district, with the candidates receiving the most votes being elected. Candidates were required to be at least 25 years old and have lived in Guam for at least five years before the election.

== Results ==
The Popular Party won a majority of seats, with the remainder won by independents.

== Aftermath ==
Antonio Borja Won Pat was re-elected as Speaker.
