= Cynthia Torres =

Guamanian businesswoman, politician and educator

Member of the Legislature
- In office 1954–1956

Personal details
- Born: 27 July 1911; Hagåtña, Guam
- Died: 6 March 2001 (aged 89); Tamuning, Guam
- Political party: Independent
- Occupation: Businesswoman, politician, educator

Cynthia Johnston Torres (27 July 1911 – 6 March 2001) was a Guamanian businesswoman, politician and educator. She served as a member of the Legislature of Guam from 1954 to 1956.

== Biography ==
Torres was born in Hagåtña in July 1911, the daughter of Agueda Iglesias and William Johnston, both well-known teachers. She began attending a private school in Coronado in the United States in 1925. After leaving school, she married businessman Joseph Torres in 1932, with whom she had a daughter Elaine. When Joseph died in 1946, she took over his soft drink and beer company, which she diversified into other areas ranging from ice cream to ceramics.

In the 1954 elections for the Guamanian Legislature she ran on an independent ticket alongside Lagrimas Untalan and Carlos Taitano. Their campaign meetings saw female attendees pelted with eggs and accused of prostitution. However, all three were elected, with Untalan finishing seventh and Torres fifteenth. After being elected, she became a member of the Committee on Agriculture and Natural Resources.

Torres moved to California in 1958 after selling her businesses. She enrolled at San Diego State University and gained a bachelor's degree in education from the University of California, San Diego. She subsequently earned a master's degree in special education, before returning to Guam in 1962. She joined the local school for the disabled as a consultant, later becoming its headteacher. She subsequently helped establish the New Brodie Memorial School for Handicapped Children and became a member of the Board of Trustees of Guam Memorial Hospital. She died on 6 March 2001.
