= Stand Ye Guamanians =

Regional anthem of Guam

Kantikun Guåhan
English: Guam Hymn
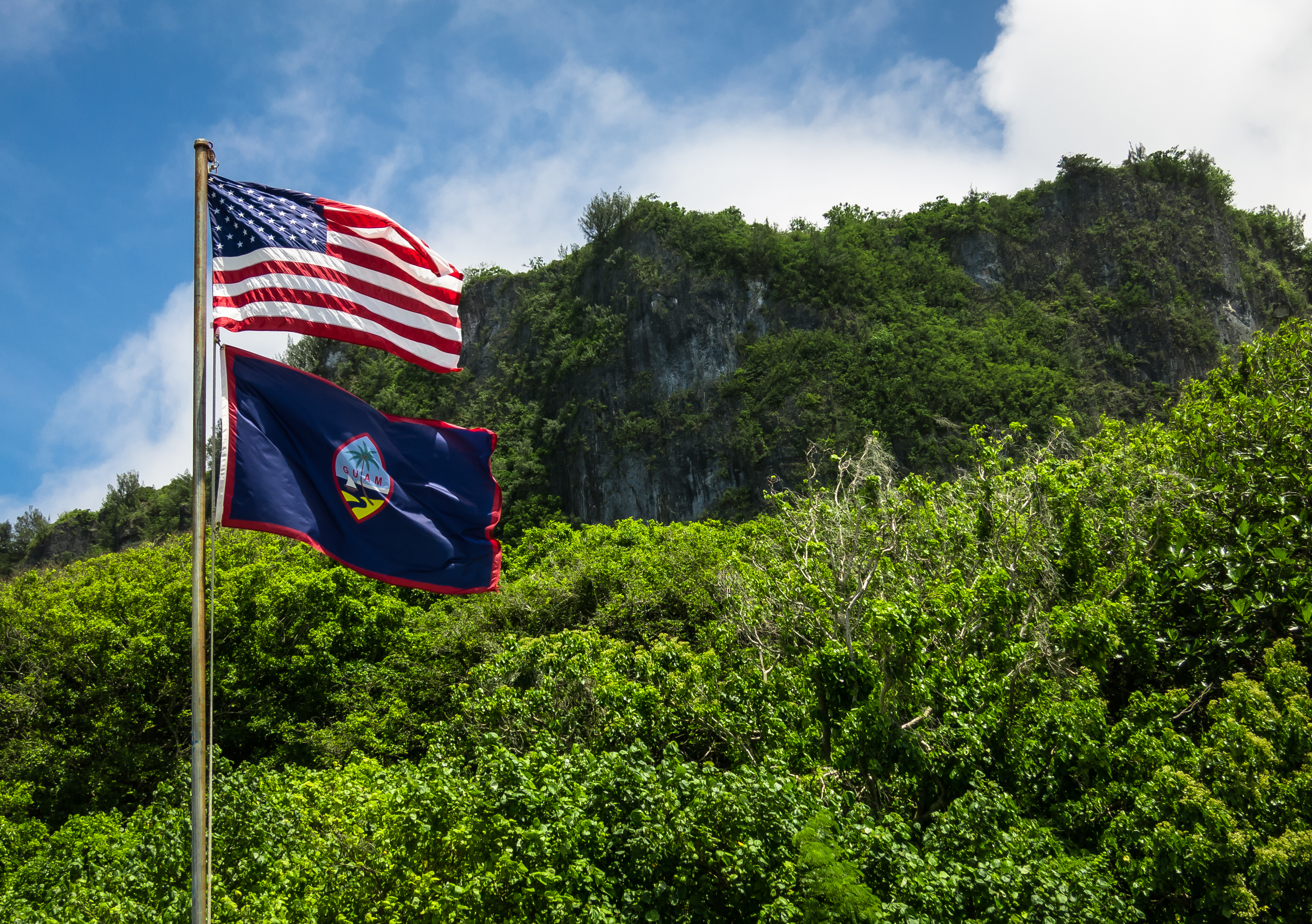
- Territorial anthem of Guam
- Also known as: Fanohge Chamoru (English: Stand Ye Guamanians)
- Lyrics: English lyrics: Ramon Manilisay Sablan, 1919; Chamorro lyrics: Lagrimas Untalan, 1974
- Music: Ramon Manilisay Sablan, 1919
- Adopted: English lyrics: Before 1934 (de facto); 1952 (de jure); Chamorro lyrics: 1989

Audio sample
- Band instrumental version (without repeats): file; help

Stand Ye Guamanians (Chamorro: Fanohge Chamoru), officially known as the Guam Hymn (Kantikun Guåhan), is the regional anthem of Guam. The original English lyrics and music were written and composed in 1919 by Ramon Manilisay Sablan. The lyrics were slightly modified by the U.S. government prior to official adoption in 1952. In 1974, Lagrimas Untalan translated the English lyrics into CHamoru, which were made official in 1989. The CHamoru version is more widely used today.

As a United States dependency, the official national anthem is still the "Star Spangled Banner", which is always played before the Guam Hymn on official occasions. The Guam Hymn, however, is played alone at international sports competitions.

== History ==
The song was originally written in English and composed in 1919 by Ramon Manilisay Sablan (1901/02–1970), the first CHamoru medical doctor and a CHamoru rights activist. Sablan, who attended Oklahoma A&M (now Oklahoma State University), was also a classically trained accomplished pianist and oboe player who also sat in the college orchestra's first violin section. He received his medical degree from the University of Louisville School of Medicine in Kentucky.

A February 1934 article in the Guam Recorder noted that the song had been sung customarily "for some years" during daily flag exercises in schools, alternating each day alongside another composition beginning with the line "All Hail to thee, our noble flag".

After World War II, the U.S. government modified the lyrics of the song, such as changing the word "Chamorros" to "Guamanians" in the first line, before officially adopting it as the territorial anthem of Guam on 2 May 1952. Despite this, the song practically disappeared from public consciousness and was no longer regularly sung by children as it had been prior to the war. However, at the turn of the 1970s, a noticeable decline in the transmission of the CHamoru language to children led to the song gaining more attention once again.

In 1974, amid a resurgence in pride at CHamoru language and culture, educator and politician Lagrimas Leon Guerrero Untalan (1911–1997) translated the song into CHamoru for Guam's first bilingual CHamoru-language education program, known as Kolehon Mandikiki ("Children's School"), which taught CHamoru to young children in public schools. On 31 January 1989, the CHamoru lyrics were made official. On 27 November 1991, it became mandatory for students to sing the anthem in CHamoru at school.

== Lyrics ==
CHamoru lyrics

I
Fanohge CHamoru put i tano'-ta (Note: CHamoru is often written in the pre-1993 orthography's Chamorro, and i has occasionally been incorrectly written as it.)
Kånta i ma tunå-ña gi todu i lugåt. (Note: Ma tunå-ña is sometimes written without a space.)
𝄆 Para i onra, para i gloria
Abiba i isla sen paråt. 𝄇 (Note: Sen paråt has been variously written as sinparat, sin paråt, sin parat, sinparåt, senparat, senparåt and sen parat.)

II
Todu i tiempo i pas para hita (Note: Sometimes written as U todu i tiempo i pas para hita.)
Yan ginen i langet na bendision. (Note: Bendision is sometimes written bendesion.)
𝄆 Kontra i piligru, na'fansåfo' ham (Note: Na'fansåfo' ham is written as na fan safu'ham in Public Law 21-70 from 1991.)
Yu'os prutehi i islan Guam. 𝄇 (Note: In the modern orthography, Guam is written Guåhan.)

IPA transcription (Note: See Chamorro language § Phonology and Chamorro language § Orthography.)

1
[fæ.noh.ge t͡sæ.mo.ru put i tæ.noʔ.tæ]
[kɑn.tæ‿i mæ tu.nɑ.ɲæ gi to.du i lu.gɑt]
𝄆 [pæ.ræ i on.ɾæ pæ.ræ i glo.ri.æ]
[æ.bi.bæ i is.læ sen.pæ.rɑt] 𝄇

2
[to.du i t(j)em.pu i pɑs pæ.ræ hi.tæ]
[d͡zæn gi.nen i læ.ŋet næ ben.di.ʃon]
𝄆 [kon.tɾæ‿i pi.li.gɾu næʔ.fæn.sɑ.fuʔ hæm]
[d͡zu.ʔus pɾu.te.hi i is.læn ɡʷɑm] 𝄇

English lyrics since 1952

I
Stand ye Guamanians for your country,
And sing her praise from shore to shore
𝄆 For her honor, for her glory,
Exalt our island forever more. 𝄇

II
May everlasting peace reign o'er us
May heaven's blessing to us come
𝄆 Against all perils, do not forsake us
God protect our isle of Guam. 𝄇

Original English lyrics
(as documented in 1934)

I
Stand ye Chamorros for our country,
And sing her praise from shore to shore,
𝄆 For her honor, For her glory,
Exalt our Island forevermore. 𝄇

II
May ever-lasting peace reign o'er us.
May heaven's blessings to us come;
𝄆 Against all perils, do not forsake us,
God protect our Island home. 𝄇
