= Theresa H. Arriola =

Anthropologist

- Born: Saipan, Northern Mariana Islands
- Other name: Isa Arriola
- Occupation: Cultural anthropologist
- Board member of: Our Common Wealth 670 (Chair); Northern Marianas Humanities Research Council (Secretary)

Academic background
- Education: Brown University; University of Hawaiʻi
- Alma mater: UCLA
- Thesis: Securing Nature: Militarism, Indigeneity and the Environment in the Northern Mariana Islands (2021)
- Doctoral advisor: Jessica R Cattelino

Academic work
- Discipline: Anthropology
- Institutions: Concordia University

Theresa Hill Arriola (also known as Isa Arriola) is a Northern Mariana Islander cultural anthropologist and Indigenous rights activist from Saipan, who lectures in critical Indigenous studies in the department of sociology and anthropology at Concordia University. She is also the chair of Our Common Wealth 670, an organisation that advocates for demilitarisation of the Pacific territories of the United States.

== Biography ==
Arriola was born in Saipan in the Northern Mariana Islands and is Chamorro. She attended the Northern Marianas Academy. She studied at Brown University for a BA in History, then for her MA in Anthropology from the University of Hawaiʻi. She studied for her doctorate at University of California at Los Angeles (UCLA) and graduated in 2021. Her thesis explored the how militarism intersects with Indigenous identities and the environment in the NMI, with a particular focus on the Chamorro and Refaluwasch peoples. In 2017 she was awarded a grant by the Wenner-Gren Foundation to explore the overlapping territorial claims made by the Indigenous Chamorro people and the US military.

In 2018 she joined the Board of the Northern Marianas Humanities Research Council, and has held the positions of Vice-Chair, Secretary and Treasurer. As of 2021 she is Assistant Professor of Critical Indigenous Studies in the Department of Sociology and Anthropology at Concordia University. She is a member of the Association for Social Anthropologists in Oceania.

She is Chair of Our Common Wealth 670, an organisation that advocates for "demilitarisation throughout the Marianas archipelago". She has argued publicly that levels of American military involvement in the region are unsustainable. She has also voiced concern that the US military will look at the Mariana archipelago as an alternative location for its military bases on Guam. The organisation, led by Arriola, has encouraged opposition to the US Navy's plans to extend destructive military training in the region.

== Publications ==
- Arriola, T. (2020). "Scenes from Everyday Life in the Northern Mariana Islands during the COVID-19 Pandemic," Oceania.
- Arriola, T. (2020). "Securing Nature: Militarism, Indigeneity and the Environment in the Northern Mariana Islands". UCLA.
- Arriola, T. (2022). "'Realistic' Island Environments". Theorizing the Contemporary, Fieldsights.
- Arriola, T. (2023). "Our Islands, Our Refuge: Response to Craig Santos Perez's "Blue-Washing the Colonization and Militarization of 'Our Ocean'"". The Contemporary Pacific.
