= Sharon Hart =

American higher education administrator

President of RIT Kosovo
- In office 2016–2019

President of Northern Marianas College
- In office 2011–2016
- Succeeded by: David Peter J. Attao (acting)

President of North Dakota State College of Science
- In office 2000–2006

Personal details
- Education: Michigan State University; Indiana State University; University of Illinois Urbana-Champaign

Sharon Hart is an American higher education administrator who served as president of Northern Marianas College from 2011 to 2016 and RIT Kosovo from 2016 to 2019. Her career has been characterized by her work in securing institutional accreditation, focusing degree programs on the needs of the workplace, addressing student affordability, and in academic leadership. In addition, Dr. Hart has served as a U.S. diplomat, most recently with United States Agency for International Development in Jordan from 2024–2025.

== Education ==
Hart holds a bachelor's degree from Michigan State University,a master's degree from Indiana State University, and a PhD in education from the University of Illinois Urbana-Champaign in 1995. She earned her Ph.D. from the University of Illinois Urbana-Champaign, where her dissertation focused on the role of women in non-traditional careers and salary disparities. She completed the Institute for Management and Leadership in Education (MLE) in 1993 at Harvard Graduate School of Education.

== Career ==
Hart was a K-12 teacher, department chair, college faculty member, Dean, and Vice President. Her early career included the presidency of Middlesex Community College in Middletown, Connecticut. She resigned from this role on January 19, 2000, which followed an April 1999 vote of no confidence from faculty who were concerned that her focus on vocational training would be detrimental to academic programs. She also worked as the vice president for academic and student affairs at Northcentral Technical College in Wisconsin.

For six years, Hart was the president of North Dakota State College of Science (NDSCS) in Wahpeton, North Dakota. During her time at the institution the college successfully retained accreditation, implemented a long-term strategic plan, increased student enrollments, and opened new degree programs. Hart resigned in September 2006.

=== Northern Marianas College ===
In 2011, Hart was specifically hired as the president of Northern Marianas College (NMC) to lead the effort to regain its institutional accreditation with the U.S. Western Association of Schools and Colleges. At the time, the college had been placed on "Show Cause Status," a final step before the potential loss of accreditation and closure. Hart was the board's second choice for the position after the top candidate rejected the offer. Within one year, she prepared the college for a visit that resulted in NMC regaining full institutional accreditation.

During her time at Northern Marianas College, Hart successfully led the effort for the Pacific islands to gain membership in the Western Interstate Commission for Higher Education (WICHE), which allowed Pacific Islanders to attend college in 15 U.S. states at in-state tuition rates. For this work, she was appointed to the WICHE Commission by the Governor of the Northern Mariana Islands and was subsequently elected to its executive committee.

In December 2012, 19 of 23 full-time faculty members at NMC passed a vote of no confidence against her. The reasons cited included allegations of financial mismanagement, unethical conduct, and jeopardizing the college's accreditation. The specific accusations included overspending on off-island travel and hiring her husband as a foundation consultant. Hart denied the claims. The Board reviewed all allegations and found in favor of Dr. Hart. That same month, she publicly opposed a proposal to merge the Commonwealth of the Northern Mariana Islands Public School System with NMC.

In November 2015, Hart announced that she would not renew her contract, which was set to end in July 2016. On February 4, 2016, she began an extended leave of absence, and David Peter J. Attao was appointed acting president.

=== RIT Kosovo ===
In May 2016, Hart was named the new president of RIT Kosovo, becoming the first woman to lead the institution. She served in this role from 2016 to 2019. Since that time Hart has served as a higher education consultant in both the US and abroad. She is the CEO of Affordable US Education.

== Personal life ==
Hart is married to Steven West.
