= Joaquin C. Arriola =

Democratic Party of Guam politician (1925–2022)

Joaquin C. "Kin" Arriola

Speaker of the Guam Legislature
- In office January 2, 1967 – January 4, 1971
- Preceded by: Carlos P. Taitano
- Succeeded by: Florencio T. Ramirez

Member of the 9th and 10th Guam Legislatures
- In office January 2, 1967 – January 4, 1971

Member of the 3rd and 4th Guam Legislatures
- In office January 3, 1955 – January 5, 1959

Personal details
- Born: December 25, 1925; Agana, Guam, U.S.
- Died: May 4, 2022 (aged 96)
- Political party: Popular Party and Democratic Party of Guam
- Spouse: Elizabeth P. "Belle" Arriola
- Children: 8

Joaquin Camacho Arriola (December 25, 1925 – May 4, 2022) was an American attorney and Democratic Party of Guam politician in Guam. Arriola served as a senator in the Guam Legislature from 1955 to 1959 and as a senator in and Speaker of the Guam Legislature from 1967 to 1971, ran for Governor of Guam in 1974, and was the husband of former senator in the Guam Legislature Elizabeth P. Arriola.

== Early life ==
Arriola was born on December 25, 1925, in Agana, Guam, to Vicente F. Arriola and Maria S. Arriola.

He graduated cum laude with a Bachelor of Arts at the College of St. Thomas in 1950. He earned his Juris Doctor at the University of Minnesota Law School in 1953. He was admitted to the Bar for Minnesota in 1953.

== Professional life ==
Arriola was elected to the Guam Legislature in 1954 and served for two consecutive terms. Arriola was admitted to the Guam Bar in 1957. He served as legal counsel for the 5th, 6th, and 7th Guam Legislatures from 1959 until 1965. Arriola served as a Selective Service Government Appeal Agent from 1959 until 1971.

== Guam Legislature ==
=== Elections ===
Elections	Guam Legislature	General Rank (Votes)	Result
1954	3rd Guam Legislature	19 (3,238)	Elected
1956	4th Guam Legislature	1 (6,164)	Elected
1966	9th Guam Legislature	1 (9,709)	Elected
1968	10th Guam Legislature	1 (10,038)	Elected

=== Leadership ===
- Speaker, 9th Guam Legislature (1967–1969)
- Speaker, 10th Guam Legislature (1969–1971)

== Joaquin C. Arriola and Vicente Bamba ==
In 1970, Arriola teamed up with Vicente Bamba in the Democratic Party of Guam Gubernatorial Primary. In the primary, Arriola-Bamba faced the teams of Ricardo J. Bordallo and Richard F. Taitano and former appointed governor Manuel F. Leon Guerrero and Antonio C. Yamashita. The Bordallo-Taitano team faced the Republican team of Camacho-Moylan in the 1970 Guam Gubernatorial General Election.

== Arriola-Nelson gubernatorial ticket ==
In 1974, Arriola teamed up with Ted S. Nelson in the Democratic Party of Guam Gubernatorial Primary. In the primary, Arriola-Nelson placed 4th against the teams of Ricardo J. Bordallo and Rudolph G. Sablan, Pedro C. Sanchez and Esteban U. Torres, and Manuel F.L. Guerrero and David D.L. Flores, with 1,254 votes.

== Leadership ==
- President, Guam Bar Association (1956–1957)
- Chairman, Territorial Planning Commission (1962–1966)
- Chairman, Guam Housing and Urban Renewal Authority (1963–1964)
- Chairman, Board of Regents, College of Guam (1963–1966)
- Associate Justice (Part Time), Supreme Court of Guam (1996–2006)

== Personal life ==
Arriola died on May 4, 2022, at the age of 96.

Political offices
Preceded by Carlos P. Taitano	Speaker of the Guam Legislature; 1967–1971	Succeeded by Florencio Ramirez
