= 1966 Guamanian legislative election =

Parliamentary elections were held in Guam in 1966. The Democratic Party of Guam won all 21 seats in a "blackjack victory".

== Electoral system ==
The 21 members of the Legislature were elected from a single district, with the candidates receiving the most votes being elected. Candidates were required to be at least 25 years old and to have lived in Guam for at least five years before the election.

== Campaign ==
The Democratic Party campaign included attacks on the Territorial Party government for stopping the urban renewal programme, which was popular with voters.

== Results ==
The Democratic Party won all 21 seats, with the Territorial Party left seatless after its top candidate received around 1,000 votes fewer than the lowest-ranked Democratic Party candidate.
