= 1964 Guamanian legislative election =

Legislative elections were held in Guam in 1964.

== Electoral system ==
The 21 members of the Legislature were elected from a single district, with the candidates receiving the most votes being elected. Candidates were required to be at least 25 years old and have lived in Guam for at least five years before the election.

== Results ==
The elections were won by the Territorial Party, which took 13 seats, the first time the Popular Party had lost an election since 1950, and the only time the Territorial Party won an election.
