= 1956 Guamanian legislative election =

Parliamentary elections were held in Guam in 1956. The Popular Party won all 21 seats, in what became known as a "blackjack victory".

== Background ==
Following the 1954 elections the Popular Party had split after disagreements over the election of the Speaker. Eight former Popular Party MPs formed the Territorial Party shortly before the 1956 elections.

== Electoral system ==
The 21 members of the Legislature were elected from a single district, with the candidates receiving the most votes being elected. Candidates were required to be at least 25 years old and have lived in Guam for at least five years before the election.

== Campaign ==
The Popular Party campaign included referring to the Territorial Party as the "party of the rich", and opposition to the "familia system". Nightly Popular Party rallies known as "gupot" were attended by up to 5,000 people, with James T. Sablan attacking the Territorial Party. In contrast, Territorial Party rallies attracted only 200 at most, and the Guam Party attracted little attention.

== See also ==
- 4th Guam Legislature
