= Joaquín Pérez (footballer) =

Argentine association football player

Personal information
- Full name: Joaquín Pérez Ibáñez
- Date of birth: 1 February 2000 (age 26)
- Place of birth: Buenos Aires, Argentina
- Height: 1.85 m (6 ft 1 in)
- Position: Forward

Youth career
- River Plate
- 2019: Defensa y Justicia

Senior career*
Years	Team	Apps	(Gls)
2019–2020	Al Wasl	1	(0)
- * Club domestic league appearances and goals as of 18:02, 4 February 2023 (UTC)

Joaquín Pérez Ibáñez (born 1 February 2000) is an Argentine footballer who plays as a forward, most recently for Al Wasl.

== Club career ==
Born in Buenos Aires, Pérez started his career with River Plate. In 2017, he expressed his admiration for English Premier League side Liverpool, stating that he liked their style of play and manager, Jürgen Klopp. He also cited Zlatan Ibrahimović as a player he looked up to, and wanted to emulate. The following year he trialled with Italian sides Bologna and Lazio, going close to signing with the latter.

Despite the interest from Italian clubs, he would sign for fellow Argentinian side Defensa y Justicia in 2019. However, after failing to break into the first team, he moved to the United Arab Emirates, joining Al Wasl.

== Career statistics ==
=== Club ===
As of 29 May 2020.

Appearances and goals by club, season and competition
Club	Season	League			Cup		Other		Total	
Club	Season	Division	Apps	Goals	Apps	Goals	Apps	Goals	Apps	Goals
Al Wasl	2019–20	UAE Pro League	1	0	1 (Note: Appearances in the UAE League Cup)	0	0	0	2	0
Career total			1	0	1	0	0	0	2	0
