= Ping Duenas =

Guamanian politician

Senator in the Guam Legislature
- In office January 4, 1971 – January 1, 1979

Chairman of the Democratic Party of Guam
- In office 1987–1990
- Preceded by: F. Phillip Carbullido
- Succeeded by: Priscilla T. Tuncap

Personal details
- Born: Jose Andres Ramirez Duenas; October 17, 1930 Dededo, Guam
- Died: August 31, 2009 (aged 78) En route to Anaheim
- Resting place: Guam Memorial Park
- Party: Democratic Party of Guam
- Spouse: Rosario "Ling" Perez Duenas
- Children: 8
- Occupation: Politician, public servant

Jose Andres Ramirez "Ping" Duenas (October 17, 1930 – August 31, 2009) was a Guamanian politician and public servant. Duenas served as a Senator in the Legislature of Guam from 1971 to 1978 and was a candidate for Lieutenant Governor of Guam in 1990.

== Early life ==
Duenas was born on October 17, 1930. He resided in Dededo, Guam.

== Career ==
In 1962, Duenas became a founding member of the Guam Employees Federal Credit Union (GGEFCU). That year, Duenas and 18 other Guam government employees deposited a total of $250 USD to establish the new credit union. The GGEFCU has grown substantially in terms of assets since 1962.

Duenas served Guam as a public servant and politician for twenty-eight years. He worked in the Department of Administration as the auditor and chief accountant. He also served as the chairman of the board of the Guam Housing Corporation and the vice president of financial affairs for the University of Guam.

Duenas, a member of the Democratic Party, was elected as a Senator in the Guam Legislature, where he served from 1971 until 1978. While in the legislature, he became the minority leader of the 14th Guam Legislature. During this time, he wrote a series of monthly columns detailing pressing social and political problems facing the island.

Duenas became the chairman of the Democratic Party of Guam for three years during the 1980s. In 1990, Duenas unsuccessfully ran for Lt. Governor as the running mate of Madeleine Bordallo in the gubernatorial election. He also worked as the campaign treasurer for Guam Senator Frank Aguon Jr.

== Death ==
Ping Duenas was hospitalized in Guam Memorial Hospital for a week in August 2009. A decision was made to transport him to a medical facility in Anaheim, California, for medical treatment.

Duenas suffered a heart attack approximately an hour before the plane was scheduled to land in Anaheim on the flight from Hawaii on August 31, 2009. He died on the plane en route to Anaheim at the age of 78. His wife, Ling Duenas; son, Tommy; and brother, Dr. Vicente Duenas; were with him at the time.

Duenas' family informed the Speaker of the Guam Legislature, Judith Won Pat, that Duenas did not want a state funeral. His viewing and funeral mass were held at the Santa Barbara Catholic Church in Dededo. He was buried at the Guam Memorial Park in Barrigada.

Party political offices
Preceded by F. Philip Carbullido	Chairman of the Democratic Party of Guam; 1987–1990	Succeeded by Priscilla T. Tuncap
Preceded by Edward D. Reyes	Democratic nominee for Lieutenant Governor of Guam; 1990	Succeeded by Madeleine Bordallo
