= Ignacio P. Quitugua =

Guamanian politician

Member of the 9th Guam Legislature
- In office January 2, 1967 – January 6, 1969

Member of the 1st Guam Legislature
- In office January 1, 1951 – January 5, 1953

Personal details
- Born: Ignacio Perez Quitugua; February 7, 1909
- Died: October 15, 1973 (aged 64)
- Political party: Popular Party (Guam), Democratic Party of Guam
- Spouse: Rosa Arceo Quitugua
- Children: 7

Ignacio Perez Quitugua (February 7, 1909 – October 15, 1973) was a Guamanian politician, serving 2 terms in the Guam Legislature.

== Guam Legislature ==
=== Elections ===
Ignacio P. Quitugua was elected to and served in the 1st and the 9th Guam Legislatures.

Election Year	Guam Legislature	General Placement	Result
1950	1st Guam Legislature	17	Elected
1966	9th Guam Legislature	17	Elected

== Personal life ==
In May 1969, Quitugua was conferred an honorary Bachelor of Community Service as a Distinguished Educator by the College of Guam.

Quitugua was the father of former Speaker of the Guam Legislature Franklin Joseph Arceo Quitugua and great-grandfather of Congressman Michael F.Q. San Nicolas.
