= Richard Taitano =

Guamanian politician

Richard Flores "Dick" Taitano

Member of the Guam Legislature
- In office January 1, 1973 – January 5, 1981
- In office January 2, 1967 – January 4, 1971

Chairman of the Democratic Party of Guam
- In office 1967–1969
- Preceded by: Jesus U. Torres
- Succeeded by: Joaquin A. Perez

Deputy High Commissioner for the Trust Territory of the Pacific Islands
- In office 1964–1966

Director of the Office of the Territories
- In office 1961–1964

Director of the Guam Department of Finance
- In office 1952–1961

Personal details
- Born: Richard Flores Taitano; May 14, 1921; Hagatna
- Died: January 4, 1997 (aged 75)
- Political party: Democratic Party of Guam
- Spouse: Magdalena "Maggie" Santos
- Children: 3
- Education: George Washington High School

Richard Flores Taitano known as Dick Taitano (May 14, 1921 - January 4, 1997) was a Democratic Party of Guam politician in Guam. Taitano served as a senator for six terms of the Guam Legislature.

== Early life ==
Taitano was born in Hagatna on May 14, 1921 to Juan San Nicolas Taitano and Rosario Sablan Flores of Dededo, Guam.

Taitano graduated from George Washington High School in 1940 and earned a Baccalaureate degree from Berea College in 1949.

== Professional life ==
Taitano was appointed Director of the Guam Department of Finance and served from 1952 to 1961. Taitano was appointed by President John F. Kennedy to serve as Director of the Office of the Territories and served from 1961 to 1964. Taitano was appointed by President Lyndon Johnson to serve as Deputy High Commissioner for the Trust Territory of the Pacific Islands and he served from 1964 to 1966.

== Guam Legislature ==
Taitano first successfully ran as a senator in the Guam Legislature in 1966 and was reelected in 1968. Following his unsuccessful bid for Lieutenant in 1970 with Ricardo J. Bordallo, Taitano ran and was elected to four consecutive terms following his return to the legislature in the 1972 election.

=== Elections ===
Election	Guam Legislature	General Rank (Votes)	Result
1966	9th Guam Legislature	4 (9,562)	Elected
1968	10th Guam Legislature	4 (9,468)	Elected
1972	12th Guam Legislature	12 (10,556)	Elected
1974	13th Guam Legislature	6 (11,271)	Elected
1976	14th Guam Legislature	21	Elected
1978	15th Guam Legislature	1st District: 5 (3,051)	Elected

== Bordallo-Taitano 1970 Gubernatorial Ticket ==
Ricardo Bordallo ran for Governor with Taitano as his Lieutenant Governor candidate in the 1970 Guam gubernatorial election. After winning the primary election, the ticket was defeated in against the incumbent Republican Governor and Lieutenant Governor, Carlos Camacho and Kurt Moylan.

== Personal life ==
Taitano died on January 4, 1997, at the age of 75.

== Legacy ==
The Micronesian Area Research Center was named for Richard F. Taitano in 1997.

Party political offices
New office	Democratic nominee for Lieutenant Governor of Guam; 1970	Succeeded by Rudolph G. Sablan
