= Popular Party (Guam) =

Former political party in Guam

The Popular Party was a political party in Guam.

== History ==
The party was established in 1949 as the Commercial Party by a group of businessmen. Prior to the 1950 parliamentary elections, it was renamed the Popular Party. It held nearly every seat in the Legislature, retaining its dominant position following the 1952 and 1954 elections.

However, during the 1954–56 term, the party split over the election of the Speaker and eight MPs left the party to join three independents in electing Francisco B. Leon Guerrero as Speaker. The eight former Popular Party MPs later formed the Territorial Party shortly before the 1956 elections, in which the Popular Party win all 21 seats. It went on to win the 1958, 1960 and 1962 elections, winning all 21 seats again in 1960.

After becoming affiliated with the US Democratic Party, the party was transformed into the Democratic Party of Guam in 1964.
