= 1954 Guamanian legislative election =

Parliamentary elections were held in Guam in 1954.

== Electoral system ==
The 21 members of the Legislature were elected from a single district, with the candidates receiving the most votes being elected. Candidates were required to be at least 25 years old and have lived in Guam for at least five years before the election.

== Results ==
The Popular Party won a majority of seats, with the remainder won by independents.

== Aftermath ==
Following the elections there was a dispute within the Popular Party over the election of the Speaker. Eight MPs accused Antonio Borja Won Pat, who had served as Speaker during the 1950–52 and 1952–54 legislatures, of going back on a gentlemen's agreement to stand down after two terms. The eight left the party and joined with three independents to elect Francisco B. Leon Guerrero as Speaker. The eight later formed the Territorial Party.

== See also ==
- 3rd Guam Legislature
