= Territorial Party =

1956–1966 political party in Guam

The Territorial Party was a political party in Guam.

== History ==
The party was formed in 1956, shortly before the parliamentary elections, by eight MPs who had broken away from the Popular Party at the start of the 1954–56 Legislature term in a dispute over the election of the Speaker. However, the elections saw the Popular Party win all 21 seats.

After defeat in the 1958, 1960 and 1962 elections, the party won the 1964 elections. However, it went on to lose the 1966 elections, losing every seat. At the end of 1966 it was transformed into the Republican Party of Guam after becoming affiliated with the US Republican Party.
