= Alfred Flores =

Guamanian politician

Alfred S.N. Flores

Member of the Guam Legislature
- In office January 2, 1967 – January 4, 1971

Member of the Guam Legislature
- In office January 7, 1957 – January 7, 1963

Personal details
- Born: Alfred San Nicolas Flores; June 20, 1916 Inarajan, Guam
- Died: February 6, 2009 (aged 92) Malojloj, Guam
- Resting place: Our Lady of Peace Memorial Gardens, Yona
- Party: Democratic
- Spouse: Ester Duenas
- Occupation: Politician, lancheru

Alfred San Nicolas Flores (June 20, 1916 – February 6, 2009) was a Guamanian politician, lancheru and survivor of the Japanese occupation of Guam during World War II. He was one of the original founders of the Democratic Party of Guam. He served for six terms in the Guam Legislature.

== Early life ==
Flores, a lancheru as ranchers are known in Guam, began grazing approximately eight hundred head of cattle and carabao on several acres on his ranch in Inarajan early in his life. He also founded Flores Poultry Farm, which would later grow to include more than 75,000 chickens at a time. Flores also cultivated vegetables and fruit on his farm.

== World War II ==
Flores was just 25 years old at the time of the Japanese invasion of Guam in 1941 during World War II. He began to cultivate rice, all of which was used to feed the Japanese troops during the occupation. His livestock was also confiscated at times during the war in order to feed Japanese forces on the island.

During the war, Flores provided assistance to Father Jesus Baza Duenas, a Chamorro Roman Catholic priest and an outspoken critic of the Japanese. Duenas would later be captured and executed by the Japanese military.

Flores' wife, Ester Duenas Flores, was seven months pregnant with the couple's first child when Guam was liberated by the Americans in 1944.

== Politics ==
Flores held many local political offices throughout his long career on Guam. He originally served as an Inarajan commissioner, as well as an Inarajan assemblyman. He also held posts on various boards and committees.

Flores served six terms as a senator beginning in the fourth Guam Legislature.

His often fiery, often passionate speeches earned him the nickname of "Davy Crockett" in Guamanian politics. Flores always ended his campaign speeches with the Chamorro language slogan, "Bai hu puno' i toro," which translates to "I will kill the bull" in English, an allusion to his early life as a lancheru.

== Death ==
Alfred Flores died in his sleep at his home in Malojloj, Guam, on February 6, 2009, at the age of 92. He was survived by his wife of 69 years, Ester Duenas Flores. The couple would have celebrated their 70th wedding anniversary on February 18, 2009.

Flores was also survived by his three children - Lucille, May and Fred - ten grandchildren, and thirteen great-grandchildren.

His viewing and funeral mass were held at the Saint Joseph Church in Inarajan. He was intermediate at Our Lady of Peace Memorial Gardens in Windward Hills, Yona.
