= Joaquin A. Perez =

Guam politician

Joaquin Arriola "Kido" Perez

Member of the 10th and 11th Guam Legislatures
- In office January 6, 1969 – January 1, 1973

Member of the 1st, 2nd, 3rd, 4th, 5th, and 6th Guam Legislatures
- In office January 1, 1951 – January 2, 1961

Personal details
- Born: Joaquin Arriola Perez; March 14, 1916
- Died: October 7, 1984
- Political party: Democratic Party of Guam
- Spouse: Macrena Aquiningoc
- Children: 5

Joaquin Arriola "Kido" Perez (March 14, 1916 – October 7, 1984) was a Democratic Party of Guam politician in Guam. Perez served eight terms as a senator in the Guam Legislature.

== Early life ==
Joaquin Arriola Perez was born on March 14, 1916 to Pedro Leon Guerrero Perez and Ana Alvarez Arriola Perez.

== Personal life ==
Perez was married to Macrena Aquiningoc Perez. Together, they raised 5 children.

== Guam Legislature ==
Perez first successfully ran as a senator in the Guam Legislature in 1950 and was reelected to 5 consecutive terms. He successfully ran as a senator in the Guam Legislature in 1968 and was reelected in 1970. He ran for senator in 1972 but was defeated in the general election.

=== Elections ===
Election	Guam Legislature	Primary Rank (Votes)	General Rank (Votes)	Result
1950	1st Guam Legislature	Not available	14 (Not available)	Elected
1952	2nd Guam Legislature	Not available	8 (Not available)	Elected
1954	3rd Guam Legislature	Not available	18 (3,286)	Elected
1956	4th Guam Legislature	Not available	10 (5,604)	Elected
1958	5th Guam Legislature	Not available	10 (4,961)	Elected
1960	6th Guam Legislature	Not available	12 (5,786)	Elected
1968	10th Guam Legislature	Not available	9 (8,693)	Elected
1970	11th Guam Legislature	14 (5,190)	12 (10,147)	Elected
1972	12th Guam Legislature	20 (4,083)	Not available	Not elected

== Death ==
Perez died on October 7, 1984.
