= Florencio Ramirez =

American politician

Speaker of the Guam Legislature
- In office January 4, 1971 – January 6, 1975
- Preceded by: Joaquin C. Arriola
- Succeeded by: Joseph F. Ada

Member of the Guam Legislature
- In office January 1, 1951 – January 6, 1975

Personal details
- Born: Florencio Torres Ramirez; October 29, 1915 Guam
- Died: April 12, 1995 (aged 79) Ordot, Guam
- Party: Democratic Party of Guam
- Occupation: Politician

Florencio Torres Ramirez (October 29, 1915 – April 12, 1995) was a Guamanian politician who was a Democratic senator in 12 Guam Legislatures and as Speaker of the 11th and 12th Guam Legislatures.

== Early life ==
Florencio Torres Ramirez was born in Agana, Guam, on October 29, 1915.

== Guam Legislature ==
=== Elections ===
Ramirez was first elected to the Guam Legislature on the November 9, 1950, election. He was reelected and served to 11 subsequent terms in the Guam Legislature.

Election Year	Guam Legislature	General Election Votes (Rank)	Result
1950	1st Guam Legislature	N/A (18)	Elected
1952	2nd Guam Legislature	N/A (11)	Elected
1954	3rd Guam Legislature	2,840 (21)	Elected
1956	4th Guam Legislature	5,223 (12)	Elected
1958	5th Guam Legislature	5,061 (8)	Elected
1960	6th Guam Legislature	5,720 (14)	Elected
1962	7th Guam Legislature	5,702 (7)	Elected
1964	8th Guam Legislature	7,734 (16)	Elected
1966	9th Guam Legislature	9,233 (7)	Elected
1968	10th Guam Legislature	8,966 (6)	Elected
1970	11th Guam Legislature	10,305 (7)	Elected
1972	12th Guam Legislature	10,508 (16)	Elected
1974	13th Guam Legislature	N/A (N/A)	Not elected

=== Leadership positions ===
- Speaker, 11th Guam Legislature
- Speaker, 12th Guam Legislature

== Delegate to the Democratic National Convention ==
Ramirez represented Guam as a Delegate to the Democratic National Convention in 1964 and 1972.

== Death ==
Ramirez died on April 12, 1995, at the age of 79.

== See also ==
- Guam Legislature
- Democratic Party of Guam

Political offices
Preceded by Joaquin C. Arriola	Speaker of the Guam Legislature; 1971–1975	Succeeded by Joseph Franklin Ada
