= Legislature of Guam =

Unicameral legislative branch of the US territory, Guam

Coordinates: 13°28′32.5″N 144°44′55.7″E

Legislature of Guam Lehislaturan Guåhan
- 38th Guam Legislature
- Territorial Seal of Guam

Type
- Type: Unicameral
- Term limits: no limit

History
- Founded: May 23, 1950
- Preceded by: Guam Congress

Leadership
- Speaker: Frank Blas (R) since January 6, 2025
- Vice Speaker: Tony Ada (R) since January 6, 2025
- Majority Leader: Jesse A. Lujan (R) since January 6, 2025
- Minority Leader: Vacant (D) since January 6, 2025

Structure
- Seats: 15
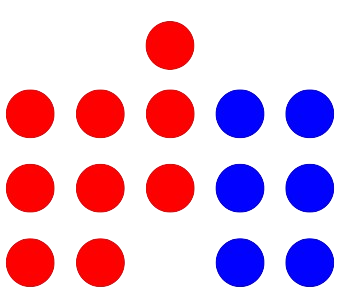
- Political groups: Majority: Republican (9); Minority: Democratic (6)
- Length of term: 2 years (no term limit)
- Authority: Organic Act of Guam
- Salary: $55,000

Elections
- Voting system: Single non-transferable vote
- Last election: November 5, 2024
- Next election: November 3, 2026

Meeting place
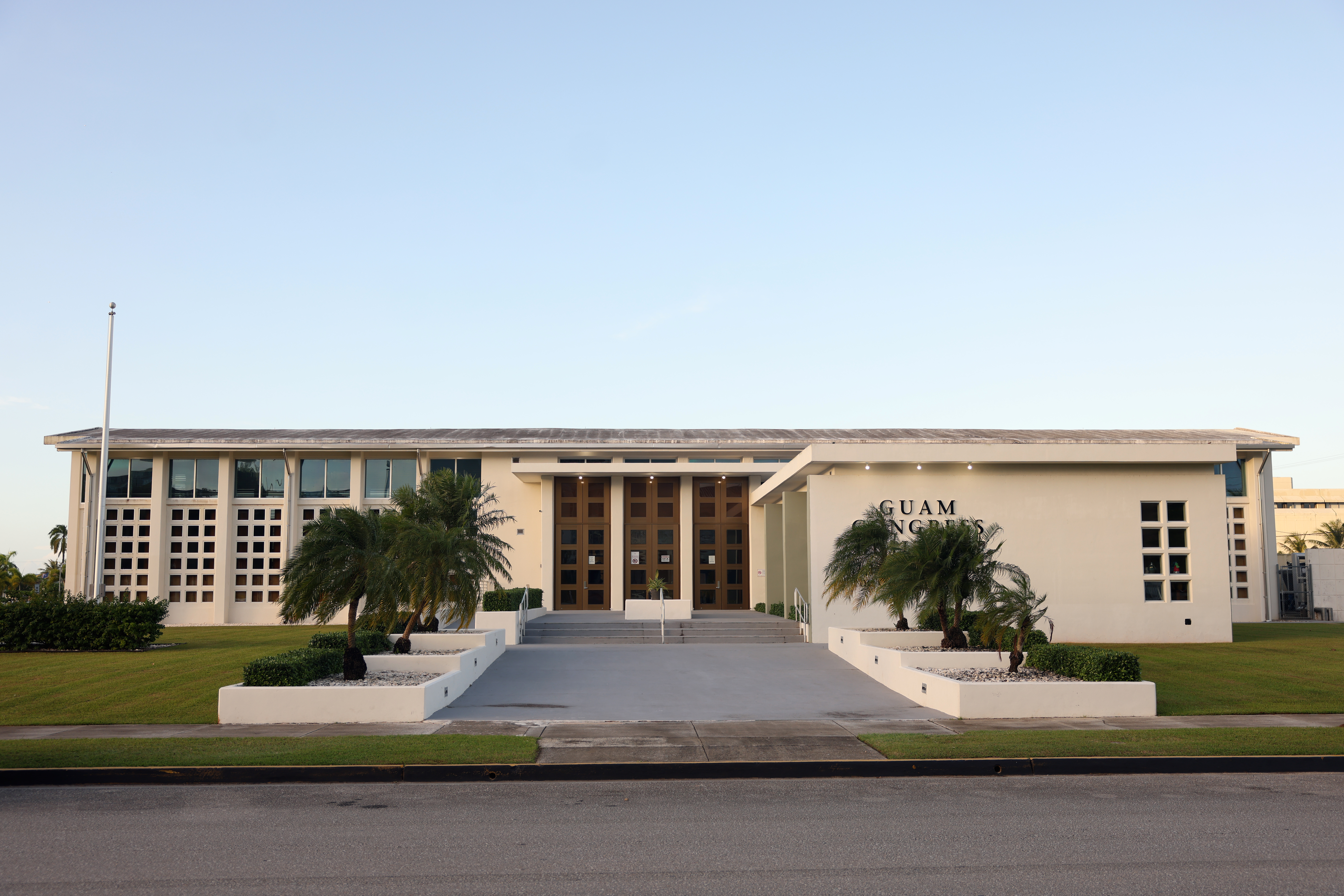
- Guam Congress Building in Hagåtña, Guam

Website
- www.guamlegislature.gov

Constitution
- Organic Act of Guam

The Legislature of Guam (Chamorro: Lehislaturan Guåhan) is the law-making body for the United States unincorporated territory of Guam. The unicameral legislative branch consists of fifteen senators, each serving for a two-year term. All members of the legislature are elected at-large with the island under one whole district. After the enactment of the Guam Organic Act in 1950, the First Guam Legislature was elected composing of 21 elected members. The current fifteen-member 38th Guam Legislature (Chamorro: I Mina' Trentai Siette Na Lehislaturan Guåhan) was elected in November 2024.

The next election will be in November 2028.

== History ==
=== American Period: 1898–1941, 1944–present ===
Spain lost Guam during the 1898 Spanish–American War in a bloodless invasion. For the next forty years, the United States Navy assumed executive control of the island, treating it more as a military outpost than an overseas territory, with little to no civilian say in the island's affairs. Governor Captain Willis Winter Bradley instituted the Guam Congress during the 1930s as an elected advisory body to the naval governor. On December 8, 1941, Imperial Japanese forces invaded Guam, beginning a three-year occupation of the island. The island was eventually retaken in 1944 during the intense Battle of Guam.

Following the end of the war, the U.S. Navy attempted to resume military control of the islands, much to the dismay of the local Chamorro population who demanded greater rights on the heels of the harsh Japanese occupation. The U.S. federal government listened. The result was the Guam Organic Act of 1950 signed by President Harry S. Truman. The act established a civilian territorial government with executive, legislative, and judicial branches. It was the first time that Guam had a democratic civilian government.

=== Speakers of the Guam Legislature ===
Legislature	Speaker	Born-Died	Term	Party
1st Guam Legislature	Antonio B. Won Pat	(1908–1987)	January 1, 1951 – January 3, 1955	Popular Party
2nd Guam Legislature	Antonio B. Won Pat	(1908–1987)	January 1, 1951 – January 3, 1955	Popular Party
3rd Guam Legislature	Francisco B. Leon Guerrero	(1897–1974)	January 3, 1955 – January 7, 1957	Territorial Party
4th Guam Legislature	Antonio B. Won Pat	(1908–1987)	January 7, 1957 – January 4, 1965	Popular Party
5th Guam Legislature	Antonio B. Won Pat	(1908–1987)	January 7, 1957 – January 4, 1965	Popular Party
6th Guam Legislature	Antonio B. Won Pat	(1908–1987)	January 7, 1957 – January 4, 1965	Popular Party
7th Guam Legislature	Antonio B. Won Pat	(1908–1987)	January 7, 1957 – January 4, 1965	Popular Party
8th Guam Legislature	Carlos P. Taitano	(1917–2009)	January 4, 1965 – January 2, 1967	Territorial Party
9th Guam Legislature	Joaquin C. "Kin" Arriola	(1925–2022)	January 2, 1967 – January 4, 1971	Democratic
10th Guam Legislature	Joaquin C. "Kin" Arriola	(1925–2022)	January 2, 1967 – January 4, 1971	Democratic
11th Guam Legislature	Florencio T. Ramirez	(1915–1995)	January 4, 1971 – January 6, 1975	Democratic
12th Guam Legislature	Florencio T. Ramirez	(1915–1995)	January 4, 1971 – January 6, 1975	Democratic
13th Guam Legislature	Joseph F. Ada	(b. 1943)	January 6, 1975 – January 1, 1979	Republican
14th Guam Legislature	Joseph F. Ada	(b. 1943)	January 6, 1975 – January 1, 1979	Republican
15th Guam Legislature	Thomas V.C. Tanaka	(b. 1940)	January 1, 1979 – January 3, 1983	Republican
16th Guam Legislature	Thomas V.C. Tanaka	(b. 1940)	January 1, 1979 – January 3, 1983	Republican
17th Guam Legislature	Carl T.C. Gutierrez	(b. 1941)	January 3, 1983 – January 5, 1987	Democratic
18th Guam Legislature	Carl T.C. Gutierrez	(b. 1941)	January 3, 1983 – January 5, 1987	Democratic
19th Guam Legislature	Franklin J. Arceo Quitugua	(1933–2015)	January 5, 1987 – January 2, 1989	Democratic
20th Guam Legislature	Joe T. San Agustin	(1931–2021)	January 2, 1989 – January 2, 1995	Democratic
21st Guam Legislature	Joe T. San Agustin	(1931–2021)	January 2, 1989 – January 2, 1995	Democratic
22nd Guam Legislature	Joe T. San Agustin	(1931–2021)	January 2, 1989 – January 2, 1995	Democratic
23rd Guam Legislature	Don Parkinson	(1942–2020)	January 2, 1995 – January 6, 1997	Democratic
24th Guam Legislature	Antonio "Tony" R. Unpingco	(1942–2007)	January 6, 1997 – January 6, 2003	Republican
25th Guam Legislature	Antonio "Tony" R. Unpingco	(1942–2007)	January 6, 1997 – January 6, 2003	Republican
26th Guam Legislature	Antonio "Tony" R. Unpingco	(1942–2007)	January 6, 1997 – January 6, 2003	Republican
27th Guam Legislature	Vicente "Ben" C. Pangelinan	(1955–2014)	January 6, 2003 – January 3, 2005	Democratic
28th Guam Legislature	Mark Forbes	(1954–2025)	January 3, 2005 – March 7, 2008	Republican
29th Guam Legislature	Mark Forbes	(1954–2025)	January 3, 2005 – March 7, 2008	Republican
29th Guam Legislature	Judith T. Won Pat	(b. 1949)	March 7, 2008 – January 2, 2017	Democratic
30th Guam Legislature	Judith T. Won Pat	(b. 1949)	March 7, 2008 – January 2, 2017	Democratic
31st Guam Legislature	Judith T. Won Pat	(b. 1949)	March 7, 2008 – January 2, 2017	Democratic
32nd Guam Legislature	Judith T. Won Pat	(b. 1949)	March 7, 2008 – January 2, 2017	Democratic
33rd Guam Legislature	Judith T. Won Pat	(b. 1949)	March 7, 2008 – January 2, 2017	Democratic
34th Guam Legislature	Benjamin J.F. Cruz	(b. 1951)	January 2, 2017 – August 28, 2018	Democratic
34th Guam Legislature	Therese M. Terlaje (acting)	(b. 1964)	August 28, 2018 – January 7, 2019	Democratic
35th Guam Legislature	Tina Muña Barnes	(b. 1962)	January 7, 2019 – January 4, 2021	Democratic
36th Guam Legislature	Therese M. Terlaje	(b. 1964)	January 4, 2021 – January 6, 2025	Democratic
37th Guam Legislature	Therese M. Terlaje	(b. 1964)	January 4, 2021 – January 6, 2025	Democratic
38th Guam Legislature	Frank F. Blas Jr.	(b. 1962)	January 6, 2025 – present	Republican

== Structure of the Guam Legislature ==
The Guam Organic Act of 1950 provides for the establishment of the Guam Legislature. The Organic Act provides that the Guam Legislature is a unicameral body with up to twenty-one members and that elections shall be held every two years. Until a change to Guam law in 1996, the Guam Legislature had 21 members, called senators, but since then it has had 15 senators. Senators of the Guam Legislature have been elected both by a number of at-large districts and by an island-wide at-large election. Since the 1980s, senators of the Guam Legislature have been elected at-large through an open partisan primary and a subsequent island-wide election.

== Qualifications ==
The qualifications for membership in the legislature are expressly stated in the Organic Act of Guam:

- a candidate must be at least twenty-five years old, and;
- a candidate must have lived on Guam for at least five years preceding the sitting of the legislature in which they seek to become a member.

== Seat ==
The legislature currently meets at the Guam Congress Building along Chalan Santo Papa in the village of Hagåtña, directly across from the Dulce Nombre de Maria Cathedral Basilica.

== Historic composition ==
The biennial legislative terms and the years of general elections are listed in the table below, along with the number of Democratic, Republican, and Independents and Other Parties' seats in each respective legislative term.

The parties are as follows: Democratic (D), Popular (P), Republican (R), and Territorial (T).

Legislative Term	Election	Democrats	Republicans	Independents/Other	Total Seats
1st Guam Legislature	1950	0	0	21	21
2nd Guam Legislature	1952	0	0	21	21
3rd Guam Legislature	1954	0	0	21	21
4th Guam Legislature	1956	0	0	21	21
5th Guam Legislature	1958	0	0	21	21
6th Guam Legislature	1960	0	0	21	21
7th Guam Legislature	1962	0	0	21	21
8th Guam Legislature	1964	0	0	21	21
9th Guam Legislature	1966	21	0	0	21
10th Guam Legislature	1968	21	0	0	21
11th Guam Legislature	1970	15	6	0	21
12th Guam Legislature	1972	14	7	0	21
13th Guam Legislature	1974	9	12	0	21
14th Guam Legislature	1976	8	13	0	21
15th Guam Legislature	1978	7	14	0	21
16th Guam Legislature	1980	10	11	0	21
17th Guam Legislature	1982	14	7	0	21
18th Guam Legislature	1984	11	10	0	21
19th Guam Legislature	1986	13	8	0	21
20th Guam Legislature	1988	13	8	0	21
21st Guam Legislature	1990	12	9	0	21
22nd Guam Legislature	1992	13	8	0	21
23rd Guam Legislature	1994	13	8	0	21
24th Guam Legislature	1996	10	11	0	21
25th Guam Legislature	1998	3	12	0	15
26th Guam Legislature	2000	7	8	0	15
27th Guam Legislature	2002	9	6	0	15
28th Guam Legislature	2004	6	9	0	15
29th Guam Legislature	2006	7	8	0	15
29th Guam Legislature	Jan. 2008	8	7	0	15
30th Guam Legislature	2008	10	5	0	15
30th Guam Legislature	2009	9	6	0	15
31st Guam Legislature	2010	9	6	0	15
32nd Guam Legislature	2012	9	6	0	15
33rd Guam Legislature	2014	9	6	0	15
34th Guam Legislature	2016	9	6	0	15
35th Guam Legislature	2018	10	5	0	15
36th Guam Legislature	2020	8	7	0	15
37th Guam Legislature	2022	9	6	0	15
38th Guam Legislature	2024	6	9	0	15

== See also ==
- List of state and territorial capitols in the United States
