= Antonio Borja Won Pat =

American politician (1908–1987)

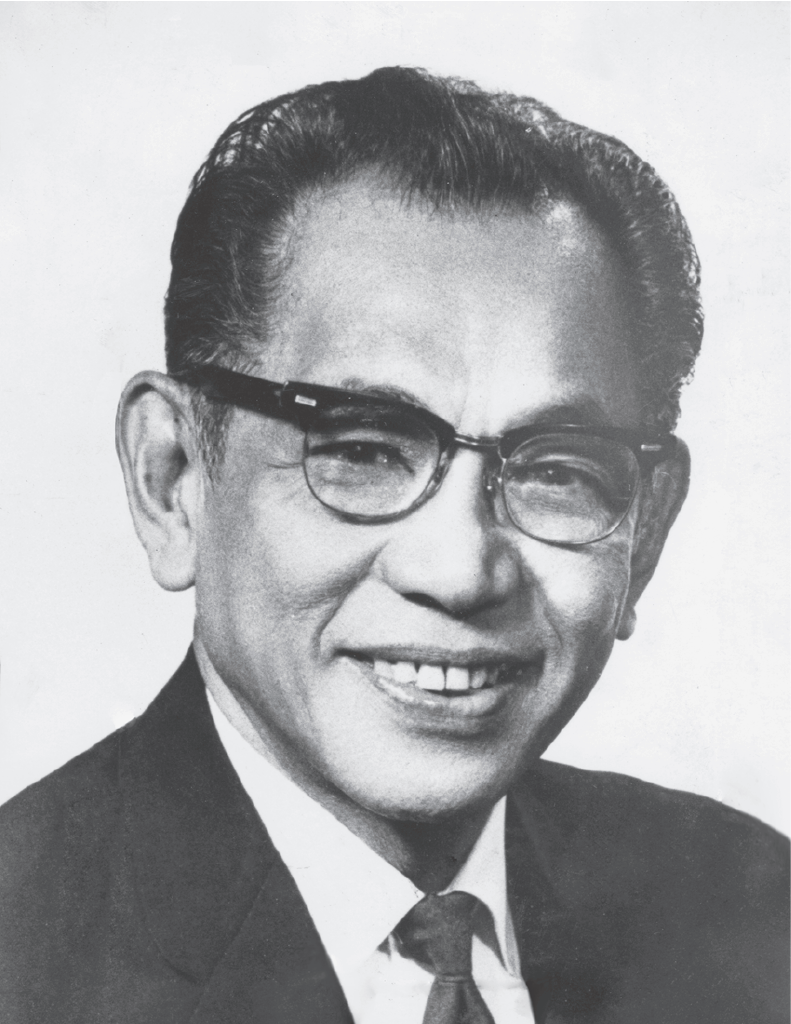

Delegate to the U.S. House of Representatives from Guam's at-large district
- In office January 3, 1973 – January 3, 1985
- Preceded by: Himself (Washington Representative)
- Succeeded by: Ben Blaz

Washington Representative of Guam
- In office January 3, 1965 – January 3, 1973
- Preceded by: Constituency established
- Succeeded by: Himself (Delegate)

Speaker to the Guam Legislature
- In office January 7, 1957 – January 3, 1965
- Preceded by: Francisco Leon Guerrero
- Succeeded by: Carlos Taitano
- In office January 1, 1951 – January 3, 1955
- Preceded by: Position established
- Succeeded by: Francisco Leon Guerrero

Personal details
- Born: December 10, 1908 Sumay, Guam, U.S. (now Sånta Rita-Sumai)
- Died: May 1, 1987 (aged 78) Silver Spring, Maryland, U.S.
- Party: Popular (before 1961); Democratic (1961–1987)
- Spouse: Ana Salas Perez (m. 1932)
- Children: 8, including Judi

Antonio Borja Won Pat (December 10, 1908 – May 1, 1987) was a Guamanian politician and member of the Democratic Party of Guam. He served as the first Delegate from Guam to the United States House of Representatives from 1973 to 1985.

== Early life ==
Won Pat was born in Sumay (now Santa Rita), Guam to his father Ignacio Won Pat, an immigrant from China, and his mother Maria Soriano Borja. He had two brothers and one sister, Francisco Won Pat, Vicente Won Pat and Eulalia Won Pat.

== Political career ==
Won Pat completed his primary education at the Normal School in Hagåtña. He then became a teacher and after teaching for eight years, Won Pat was nominated to the advisory Guam Congress in 1936. Prior to the signing of the Organic Act in 1950 which provided for US citizenship and limited self-government, Guam's citizens were under complete US Navy rule. The pre-Organic Act Guam Congress sat only as an advisory body to the naval governor. It consisted of two houses – the House of Council and the House of Assembly. Its members were elected by the people of their districts.

Following World War II, Won Pat began to attain influence on the island forming the Guam Commercial Corporation in 1946. Supported by the naval government, he prioritized economic self-sufficiency before achieving citizenship. GCC played a role in the post-war economic boom, but ultimately went bankrupt in 1954. By this time, Won Pat was entrenched in the House of Assembly beginning in 1948 becoming speaker of the Guam Legislature in 1951.

After World War II, the drive for American citizenship gained momentum from the Chamorros' loyalty to the United States during the Japanese occupation of Guam. After attaining the role of speaker in the Guam Congress, Won Pat along with naval Governor Carlton Skinner and Francisco B. Leon Guerrero, began work on what would become the Guam Organic Act. Gaining approval in Washington D.C., the act gave the people of Guam American citizenship and the right to establish a civil government.

== Guam Delegate (1965–1985) ==
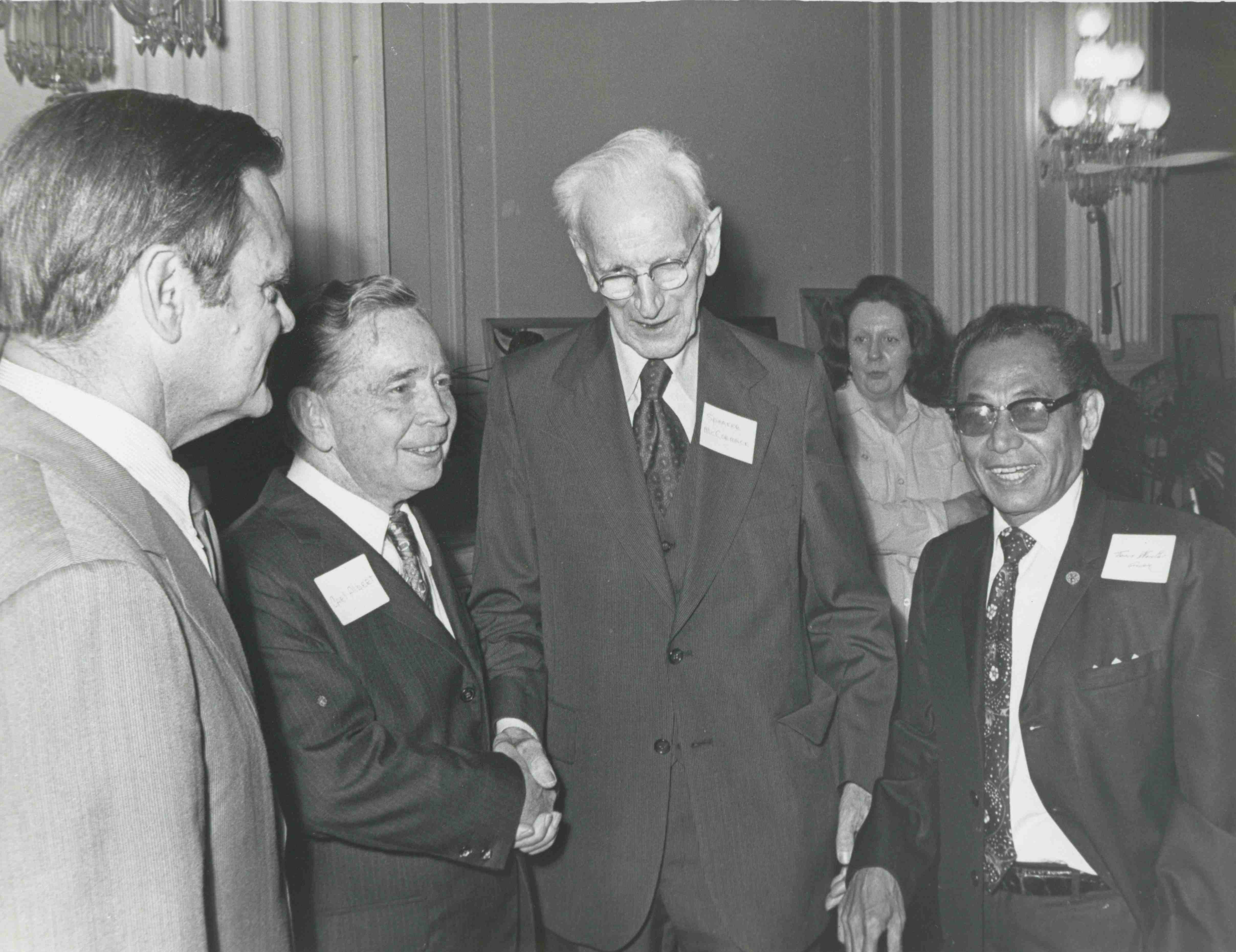
Gillis William Long, Carl Albert, John W. McCormack, and Tony Won Pat standing together at Albert's birthday, 1976.

Guam took another step toward self-representation under Won Pat in 1964 when I Mina’ Siete na Liheslaturan Guåhan/the 7th Guam Legislature created Guam's Washington Office as an elected position. Won Pat lobbied for the post and won it. While in office Won Pat spread awareness to the other state representatives about Guam and the political situation it was in, and increased federal support following his effective lobbying.

In his post in Washington, D.C., Won Pat continued the battle to gain representation in Congress and in the process gained many allies. These allies included California Congressman Philip Burton, a member of the House Interior and Insular Affairs Committee. Burton used his influence to gain the support of committee chairman Wayne Aspinall and twenty co-sponsors. Public Law 92-271 was passed on April 10, 1972. The groundbreaking bill gave Guam and the Virgin Islands representation in Congress for two-year terms. Elected officials could now speak on the House floor and introduce new legislation though they could not vote on the floor. On January 3, 1973, Won Pat became the first resident of Guam to take the oath of office as a member of the 93rd Congress.

While Won Pat was Guam's delegate to the US Congress his efforts weren't limited to his constituents on Guam. During his tenure as delegate to the U.S. Congress, he was instrumental in helping what are now the Commonwealth of the Northern Mariana Islands; the Federated States of Micronesia, comprising the island states of Kosrae, Pohnpei, Chuuk, and Yap; the Republic of the Marshall Islands and the Republic of Palau achieved more political self governance through the dismantling of the Trust Territory of the Pacific Islands.

Shortly after World War II, the Trust Territory of the Pacific Islands, not including Guam, was created and administered by the United States. In the 1970s work began to dissolve the Trust Territory as the districts voted to end their trustee status. The last district to gain political independence was Palau in 1994. The Northern Mariana Islands is now a US Commonwealth and its people US citizens. The Federated States of Micronesia, the Republic of the Marshall Islands, and the Republic of Palau negotiated Compacts of Free Association with the United States. Consequently, Guam's northern neighbors, all much more recent members of the American family, have the right to determine issues on a local level, including issues such as minimum wage and immigration, whereas the residents of Guam do not. He served six terms, until he was defeated for re-election in 1984 by Republican Ben Blaz.

== Personal life ==
Won Pat was married to Ana Salas Perez (1910–1995) in 1932 and they had eight children: Aveline Ploke, Marilyn (1934–1990), Jacqueline Won Pat, Ellen Chargualaf, Anthony Won Pat, Rosalind Fleet, Mark Won Pat, and Judith Won Pat, who is the former Speaker of the Legislature of Guam (2008–2017).

== Retirement and death ==
After his 1984 electoral defeat, Won Pat retired to Sinajana, Guam. He died in Silver Spring, Maryland, on May 1, 1987, of a heart attack. He is interred in the Veterans Cemetery, Piti, Guam.

== Honors ==
In January 1989, the Guam International Air Terminal was officially named as Antonio B. Won Pat International Airport in his honor.

== See also ==
- List of Asian Americans and Pacific Islands Americans in the United States Congress

Political offices
New office	Speaker to the Guam Legislature; 1951–1955	Succeeded by Francisco Leon Guerrero
Preceded by Francisco Leon Guerrero	Speaker to the Guam Legislature; 1957–1965	Succeeded by Carlos Taitano
U.S. House of Representatives
New constituency	Washington Representative of Guam; 1965–1973	Succeeded by Himself as U.S. Delegate
Preceded by Himself as Washington Representative of Guam	Delegate to the U.S. House of Representatives from Guam's at-large congressional district 1973–1985	Succeeded by Ben Blaz
