= Manuel U. Lujan =

Guam politician (1912–1975)

Member of the 1st through 10th Guam Legislatures
- In office January 1, 1951 – January 4, 1971

Personal details
- Born: February 17, 1912; Hagatna, Guam
- Died: January 26, 1975 (aged 62); Tamuning, Guam
- Political party: Democratic Party of Guam
- Spouse: Mariana Manglona Leon Guerrero
- Children: 4

Manuel U. Lujan (February 17, 1912 – January 26, 1975) was an educator and a Democratic Party of Guam politician in Guam. Lujan served as a senator during the first ten terms of the Guam Legislature.

== Early life ==
Manuel U. Lujan was born in Hagatna on February 17, 1912 to Manuel Olive Lujan and Carmen Ulloa Lujan.

Lujan attended Guam High School and the Normal School. He was an extension student of the University of Hawaii.

== Personal life ==
Lujan married Mariana Manglona Leon Guerrero in November 1941. Together, they raised 4 sons.

== Guam Legislature ==
Lujan first successfully ran as a senator in the Guam Legislature in 1950 and was reelected to 9 consecutive terms.

=== Elections ===
Election	Guam Legislature	General Rank (Votes)	Result
1950	1st Guam Legislature	11 (Not available)	Elected
1952	2nd Guam Legislature	5 (Not available)	Elected
1954	3rd Guam Legislature	10 (3,723)	Elected
1956	4th Guam Legislature	6 5,793)	Elected
1958	5th Guam Legislature	4 (5,250)	Elected
1960	6th Guam Legislature	2 (6,107)	Elected
1962	7th Guam Legislature	5 (5,740)	Elected
1964	8th Guam Legislature	14 (7,739)	Elected
1966	9th Guam Legislature	8 (9,192)	Elected
1968	10th Guam Legislature	11 (8,556)	Elected

=== Leadership ===
- Vice Speaker, 4th Guam Legislature
- Vice Speaker, 5th Guam Legislature
- Vice Speaker, 6th Guam Legislature
- Vice Speaker, 7th Guam Legislature

== Civic Leadership ==
- Organizer, Guam Boy Scouts (1944)
- Chairman, American Red Cross (Guam Chapter, 1950-1951)

== Later years and death ==
Lujan served as principal of Yona Elementary School from its founding in 1973 until his death on January 26, 1975.

== Legacy ==
The Guam public school Manuel U. Lujan Elementary School was named after Lujan in 1975, two years after its construction as Yona Elementary School.
