= 2022 Guam general election =

2022 Guamanian general election
- November 8, 2022

General elections were held in Guam on November 8, 2022. Voters in Guam chose their governor, non-voting delegate to the United States House of Representatives, attorney general, and all fifteen members of the territorial legislature. The election coincided with the 2022 United States elections.

== Governor of Guam ==
2022 Guamanian gubernatorial election
- November 8, 2022
- Turnout: 56.36%
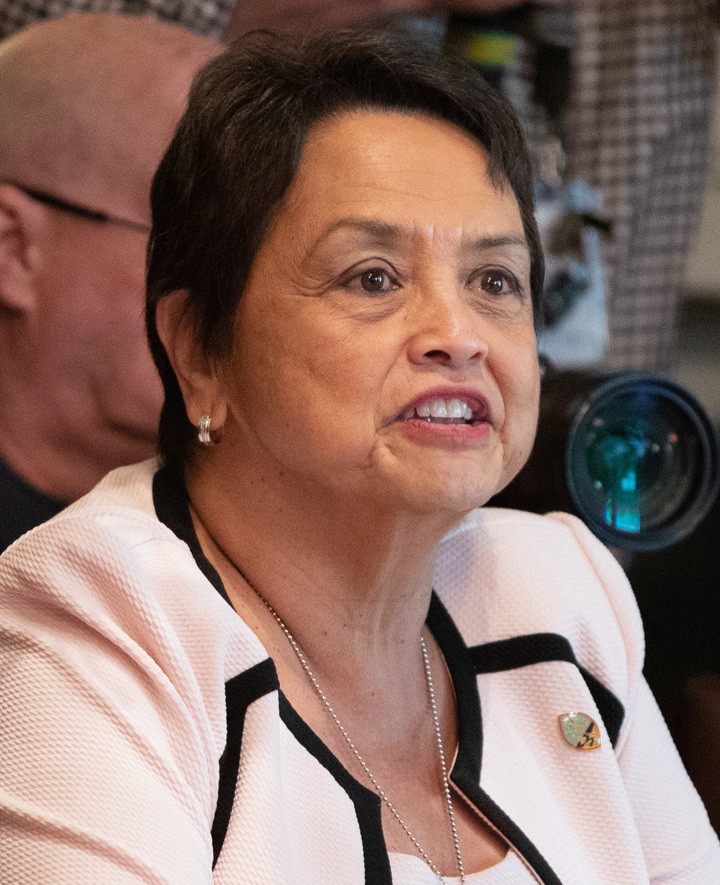

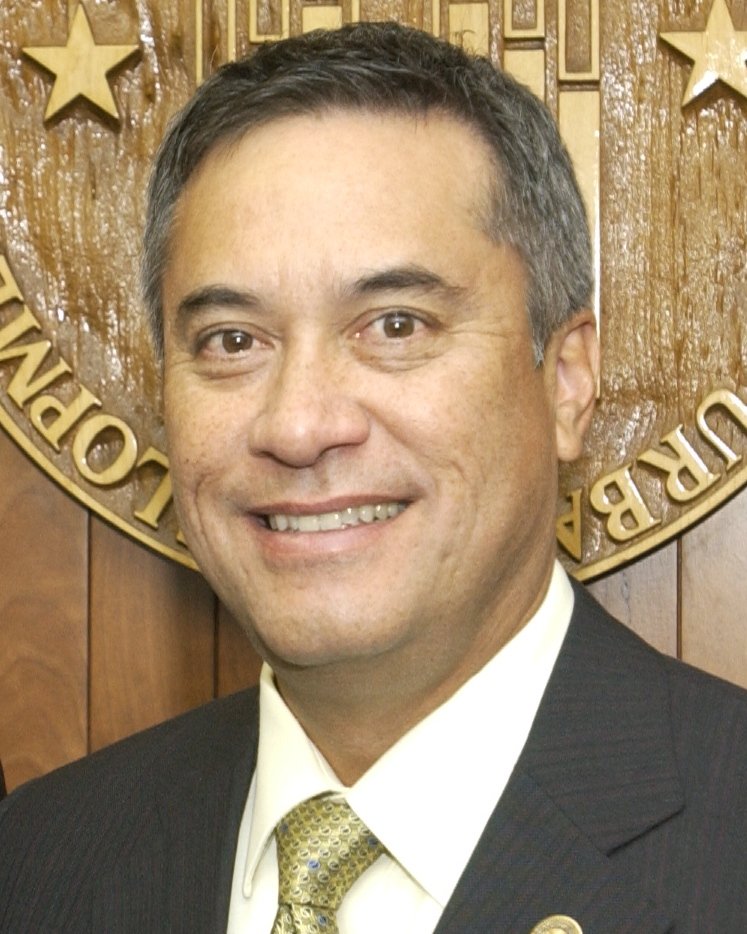
Candidate	Lou Leon Guerrero	Felix Perez Camacho
Party	Democratic	Republican
Running mate	Josh Tenorio	Tony Ada
Popular vote	18,623	14,786
Percentage	55.49%	44.06%
Governor before election
Lou Leon Guerrero
Democratic
Elected Governor
Lou Leon Guerrero
Democratic

Incumbent Democratic governor Lou Leon Guerrero sought reelection with her running mate Josh Tenorio. Felix Perez Camacho, the former governor of Guam, joined the race with Tony Ada.

Election results
Party	Candidate	Votes	%
Democratic	Leon Guerrero/Tenorio	18,623	55.49
Republican	Camacho/Ada	14,786	44.06
	Write-in	152	0.45
Total votes		33,561	100

== United States House of Representatives ==
2022 United States House of Representatives election in Guam
- November 8, 2022
- Turnout: 56.36%
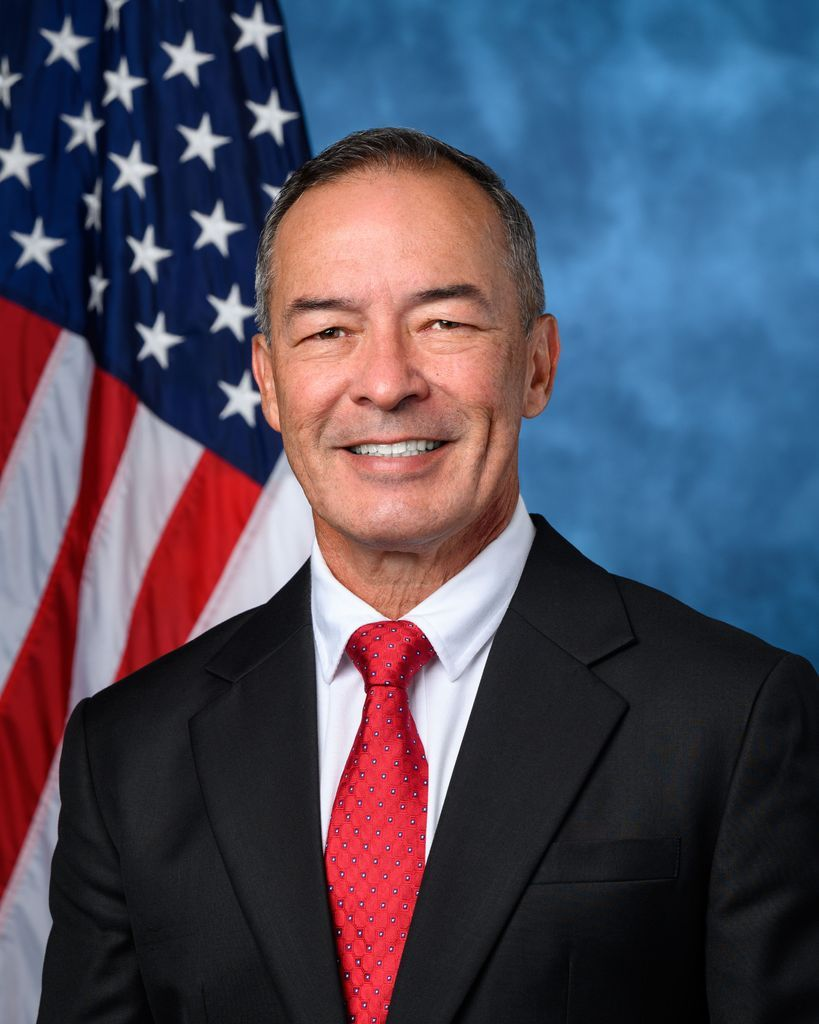

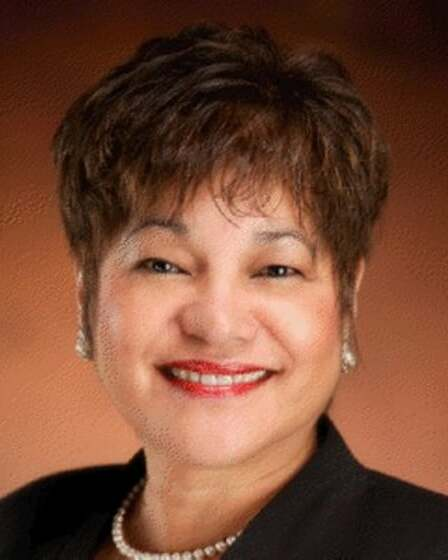
	Majority party	Minority party
Candidate	James Moylan	Judith Won Pat
Party	Republican	Democratic
Popular vote	17,260	15,636
Percentage	52.12%	47.22%
Delegate before election
Michael San Nicolas
Democratic
Elected Delegate
James Moylan
Republican

Incumbent delegate Michael San Nicolas did not seek reelection, instead ran for the governor of Guam. Two members of the Guam Legislature, James Moylan and Judith Won Pat, contested in the general election. James Moylan was elected as the 6th delegate to the United States House of Representatives.

Election results
Party	Candidate	Votes	%
Republican	James Moylan	17,260	52.12
Democratic	Judith Won Pat	15,636	47.22
	Write-in	220	0.66
Total votes		33,116	100

== Attorney General ==
2022 Guam Attorney General election
- November 8, 2022
- Turnout: 56.36%
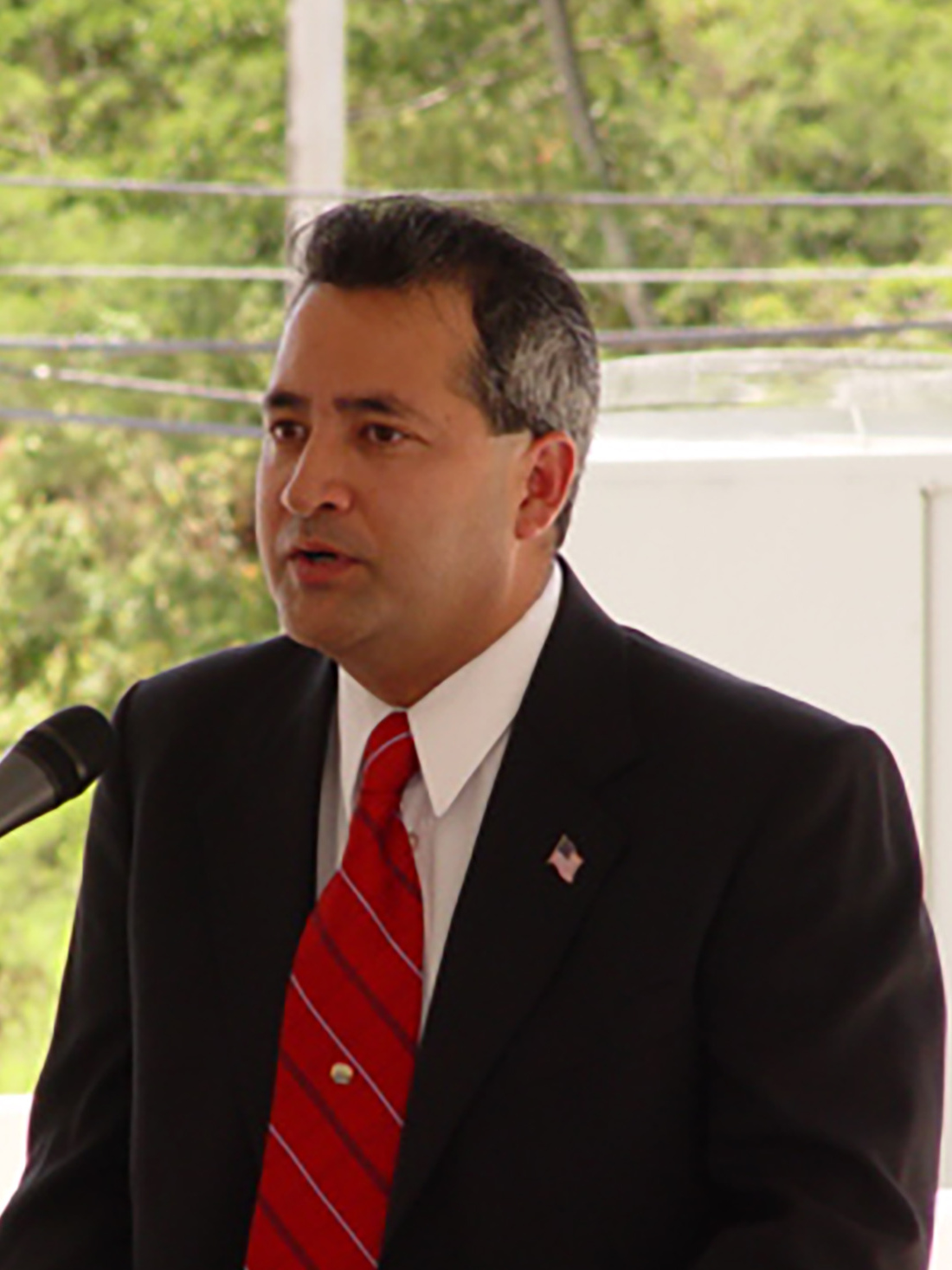
Candidate	Douglas Moylan	Leevin Camacho
Party	Independent	Independent
Popular vote	15,112	15,073
Percentage	46.19%	46.07%
Attorney general before election
Leevin Camacho
Independent
Elected Attorney general
Douglas Moylan
Republican

Two candidates sought election to the office of attorney general: Douglas Moylan and incumbent A.G. Leevin Camacho.

Election results
Candidate	Votes	%
Douglas Moylan	15,112	46.19
Leevin Camacho	15,073	46.07
Write-in	2,531	7.74
Total votes	32,716	100

== Legislature of Guam ==
2022 Guamanian legislative election
- November 8, 2022

All 15 seats of the Legislature of Guam
- Turnout: 56.36%
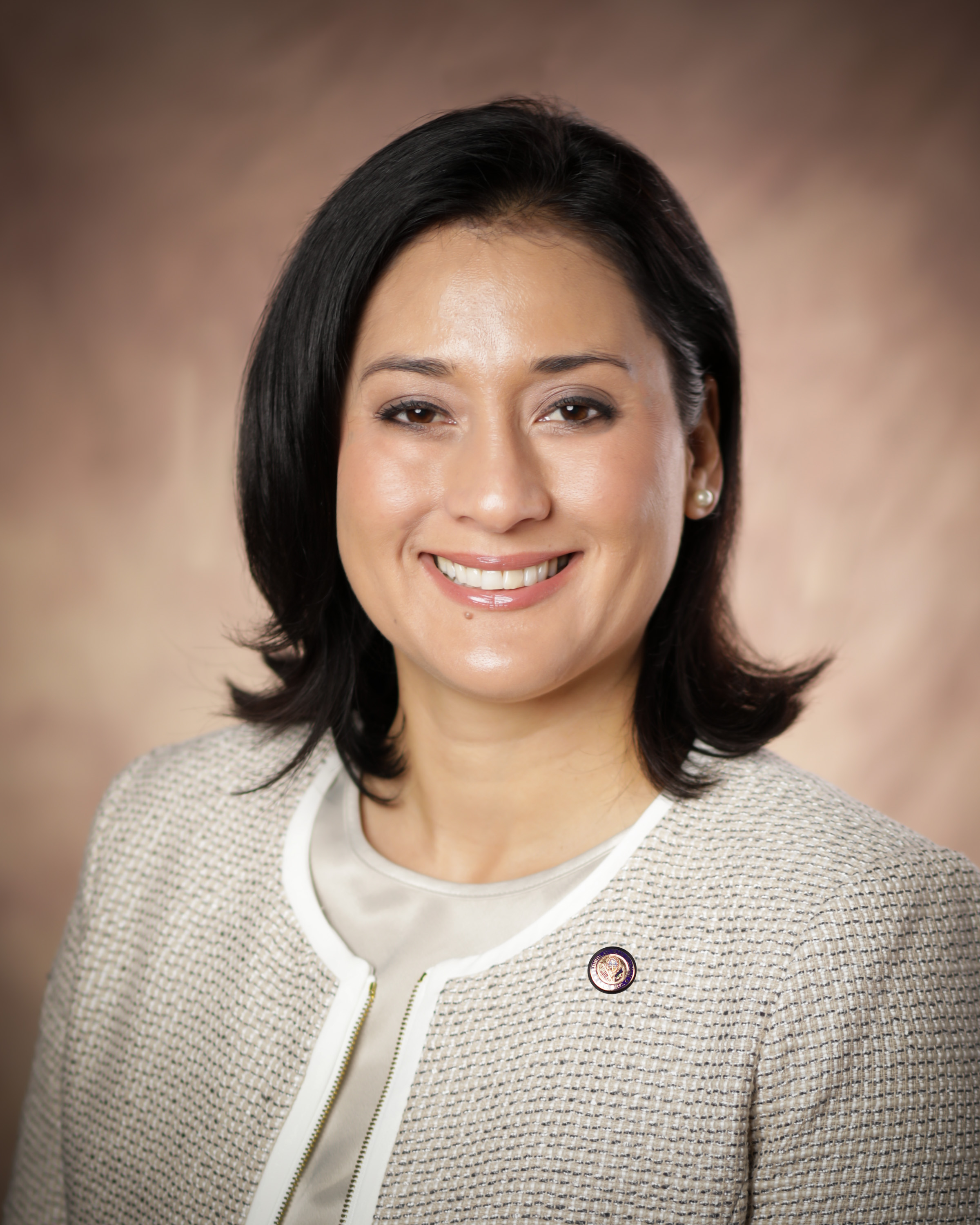
	Majority party	Minority party
Leader	Telena Cruz Nelson	Christopher M. Duenas
Party	Democratic	Republican
Leader's seat	At-large district	At-large district
Seats before	8	7
Seats after	9	6
Seat change	▲1	▼1
Speaker before election
Therese M. Terlaje
Democratic
Elected Speaker
Therese M. Terlaje
Democratic

All fifteen seats in the legislature of Guam were up for election. After the election, Democrats, under Speaker Therese M. Terlaje, controlled nine seats in the legislature, while Republicans held six seats.

== Consolidated Commission on Utilities ==
A nonpartisan election was held for three seats on the commission.

Election results
Candidate	Votes	%
Simon A. Sanchez	16,462	22.02
Michael T. Limtiaco	13,252	17.73
Francis E. Santos	12,020	16.08
Melvin F. Duenas	11,844	15.84
Nonito Vincent Blas	11,300	15.11
Ricardo Sablan Unpingco	9,748	13.04
Write-in	136	0.18
Total votes	74,762	100

== Guam Education Board ==
Nine candidates ran for the six available seats on the Guam Education Board.

Election results
Candidate	Votes	%
Mary A.Y. Okada	20,880	16.42
Peter Alecxis Diaz Ada	17,240	13.55
Angel Reyes Sablan	15,455	12.15
Ronald Lewis McNinch	14,849	11.67
Maria Atalig Gutierrez	13,754	10.81
Lourdes Mendiola Benavente	13,366	10.51
Elaine Duenas Ulloa	11,067	8.70
Joseph Cruz Santos	10,304	8.10
Raenate Santos Camacho	10,284	8.08
Total votes	127,199	100
