= 2010 national electoral calendar =

National and federal elections held in 2010

This national electoral calendar for 2010 lists the national/federal elections held in 2010 in all sovereign states and their dependent territories. By-elections are excluded, though national referendums are included.

== January ==
- 10 January: Croatia, President (2nd round)
- 17 January:
  - Chile, President (2nd round)
  - Ukraine, President (1st round)
- 22 January: Netherlands Antilles, Parliament
- 25 January: Saint Kitts and Nevis, Parliament
- 26 January: Sri Lanka, President

== February ==
- 3 February: Greece, President (by the parliament)
- 7 February:
  - Costa Rica, President and Parliament
  - Ukraine, President (2nd round)
- 15 February: Anguilla, Parliament
- 27 February: Nauru, Constitutional referendum
- 28 February: Tajikistan, Parliament

== March ==
- 4 March: Togo, President
- 6 March: Iceland, Debt repayment referendum
- 7 March:
  - Iraq, Parliament
  - Switzerland, Referendum
- 14 March: Colombia, Parliament

== April ==
- 8 April: Sri Lanka, Parliament (1st round)
- 11 April: Hungary, Parliament (1st round)
- 11–15 April: Sudan, President and Parliament
- 18 April: Northern Cyprus, President
- 20 April: Sri Lanka, Parliament (2nd round)
- 24 April: Nauru, Parliament
- 25 April:
  - Austria, President
  - Hungary, Parliament (2nd round)

== May ==
- 5 May: Mauritius, Parliament
- 6 May: United Kingdom, Parliament
- 10 May: Philippines, President, House of Representatives, Senate (one half)
- 16 May: Dominican Republic, Parliament
- 23 May:
  - Ethiopia, Parliament
  - Nagorno-Karabakh, Parliament
- 24 May: Trinidad and Tobago, Parliament
- 25 May: Suriname, Parliament
- 28–29 May: Czech Republic, Parliament
- 30 May: Colombia, President (1st round)

== June ==
- 1 and 8 June: Egypt, Shura Council
- 6 June: Slovenia, Border dispute agreement referendum
- 9 June: Netherlands, Parliament
- 12 June: Slovakia, Parliament
- 13 June: Belgium, Parliament
- 19 June: Nauru, Parliament
- 20 June:
  - Colombia, President (2nd round)
  - Poland, President (1st round)
- 26 June: Somaliland, President
- 27 June:
  - Guinea, President (1st round)
  - Kyrgyzstan, Constitutional referendum
- 28 June: Burundi, President
- 29 June: Hungary, President (indirect)
- 30 June: Germany, President (indirect)

== July ==
- 4 July: Poland, President (2nd round)
- 11 July: Japan, House of Councillors
- 19 July: Suriname, President (indirect)
- 23 July: Burundi, National Assembly
- 28 July: Burundi, Senate (indirect)

== August ==
- 1 August: São Tomé and Príncipe, Parliament
- 4 August:
  - Kenya, Constitutional referendum
  - Solomon Islands, Parliament
- 9 August: Rwanda, President
- 21 August: Australia, Parliament

== September ==
- 5 September: Moldova, Constitutional referendum
- 12 September: Turkey, Constitutional referendum
- 16 September: Tuvalu, Parliament
- 17 September: Sint Maarten, Parliament
- 18 September:
  - Afghanistan, Parliament
  - Slovakia, Political reform referendum
- 19 September: Sweden, General
- 22 September: Switzerland, Federal Council (indirect)
- 26 September:
  - Venezuela, Parliament
  - Switzerland, Referendum

== October ==
- 2 October: Latvia, Parliament
- 3 October:
  - Brazil, President (1st round) and Parliament
  - Bosnia and Herzegovina, President and Parliament
- 10 October: Kyrgyzstan, Parliament
- 15–16 October: Czech Republic, Senate (1st round) (a third)
- 22–23 October: Czech Republic, Senate (2nd round) (a third)
- 23 October: Bahrain, Parliament (1st round)
- 30 October: Bahrain, Parliament (2nd round)
- 31 October:
  - Brazil, President (2nd round)
  - Côte d'Ivoire, President (1st round)
  - Niger, Constitutional referendum
  - Tanzania, President and Parliament

== November ==
- 1 November: Nauru, President (indirect)
- 2 November:
  - United States, House of Representatives and Senate (one third: Class 3 senators)
  - American Samoa, Parliament and Constitutional referendum
  - Guam, Governor, Attorney General, Consolidated Commission on Utilities, Parliament, and Supreme Court and Superior Court retention elections
  - United States Virgin Islands, Governor and Parliament
- 7 November:
  - Comoros, President (1st round Mohéli primary)
  - Burma (Myanmar), General
  - Azerbaijan, Parliament
  - Guinea, President (2nd round)
- 9 November: Jordan, Parliament
- 17 November:
  - Cook Islands, Parliament and referendum
  - Madagascar, Constitutional referendum
- 21 November: Burkina Faso, President
- 25 November: Tonga, General
- 27 November: Iceland, Constitutional Assembly
- 28 November:
  - Côte d'Ivoire, President (2nd round)
  - Moldova, Parliament
  - Haiti, Parliament and President (1st round)
  - Egypt, Parliament (1st round)

== December ==
- 5 December: Egypt, Parliament (2nd round)
- 12 December:
  - Kosovo, Parliament
  - Slovenia, Referendum
  - Transnistria, Parliament
- 13 December: Saint Vincent and the Grenadines, Parliament
- 19 December: Belarus, President
- 26 December: Comoros, President (2nd round nationwide)

== Indirect elections ==
- 20–22 January: Uzbekistan, Senate
- 3 February: Greece, President
- 20 February: Afghanistan, House of Elders
- 15 March, 5 May and 21 June: Isle of Man, Legislative Council
- 26 March and 14 June: India, Council of States
- 1 April: San Marino, Captains Regent
- 23 April: Tajikistan, National Assembly
- 21 May: Sudan, Council of States
- 23 May: Ethiopia, House of Federation
- 24 June, 21 October and 25 November: Austria, Federal Council
- 29 June: Hungary, President
- 19 July: Suriname, President
- 28 July: Burundi, Senate
- 1 October: San Marino, Captains Regent
- 1 November: Nauru, President
- 11 November: Iraq, President
- 26–27 November: Namibia, National Council
- 3 December: Bosnia and Herzegovina, House of Peoples
