= 2018 Guam general election =

2018 Guamanian gubernatorial election
- November 6, 2018
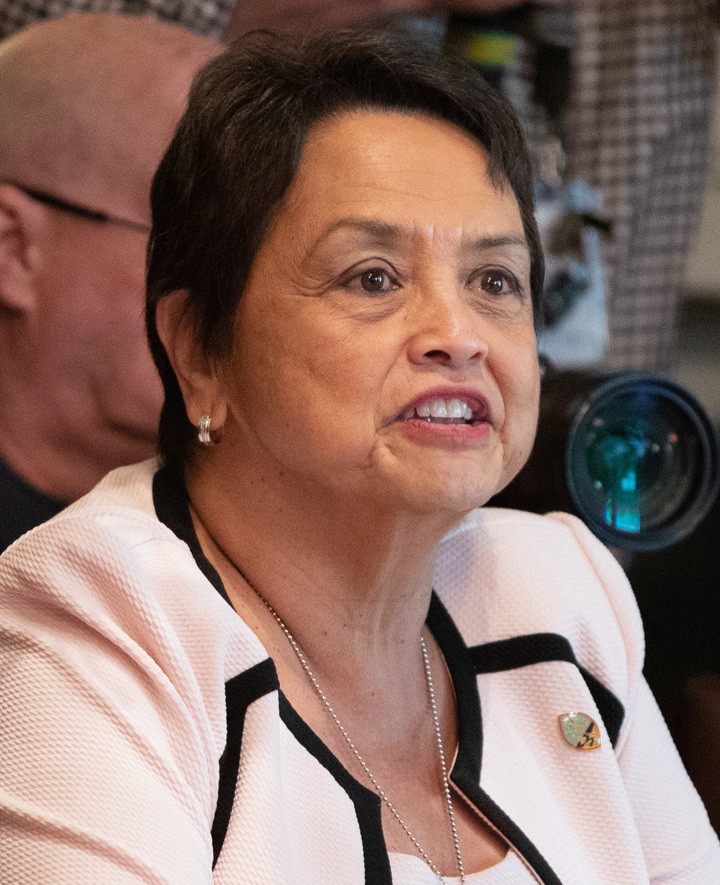

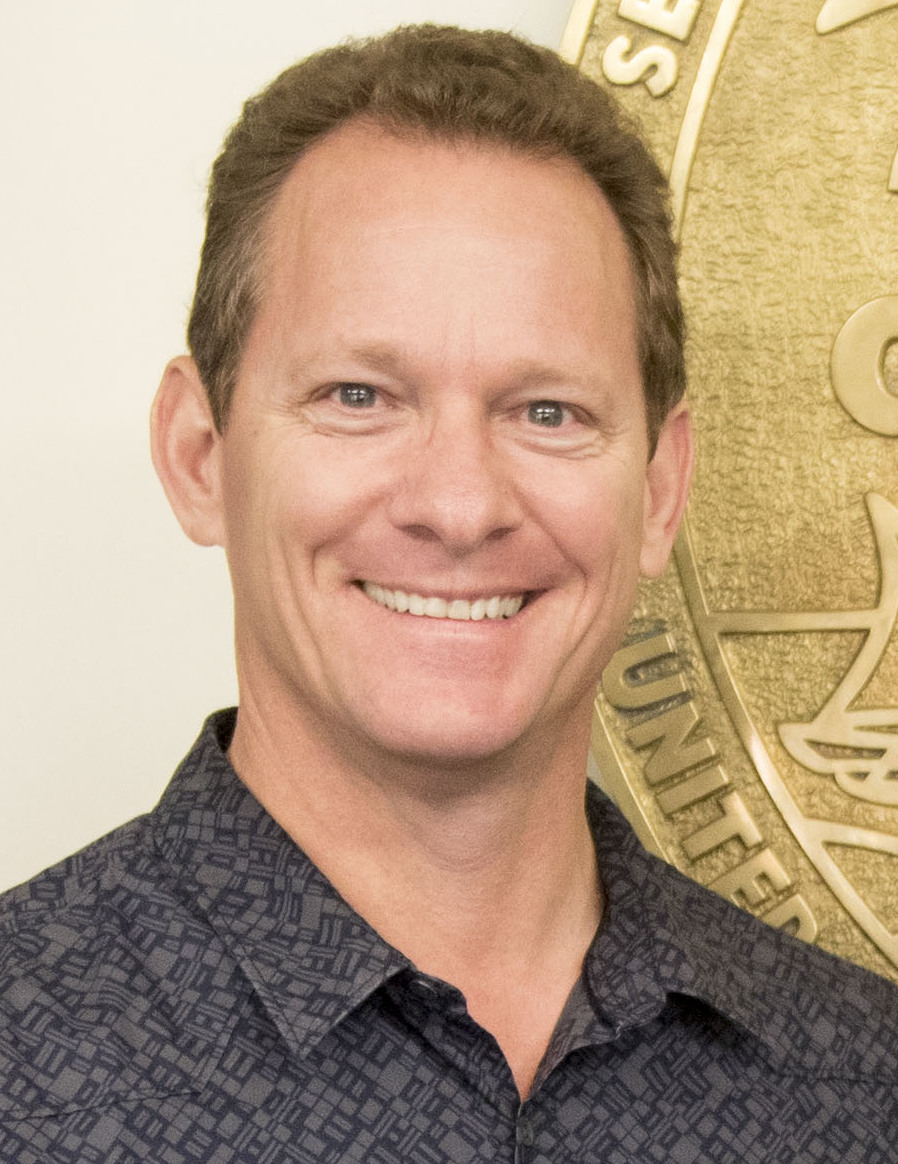

Nominee	Lou Leon Guerrero	Ray Tenorio	Frank Aguon Jr. (write-in)
Party	Democratic	Republican	Democratic
Running mate	Josh Tenorio	Tony Ada	Alicia Limtiaco
Popular vote	18,081	9,419	8,161
Percentage	50.7%	26.4%	22.9%
Governor before election
Eddie Baza Calvo
Republican
Elected Governor
Lou Leon Guerrero
Democratic

United States House of Representatives of Guam
- November 6, 2018
Nominee	Michael San Nicolas	Doris Flores-Brooks
Party	Democratic	Republican
Popular vote	19,053	15,263
Percentage	54.90	43.98
Delegate before election
Madeleine Bordallo
Democratic
Elected Delegate
Michael San Nicolas
Democratic

A general election was held in Guam on Tuesday, November 6, 2018. Voters in Guam chose their governor, non-voting delegate to the United States House of Representatives, attorney general, public auditor, and all fifteen members of the territorial legislature. The election coincided with the United States mid-term elections.

== Governor of Guam ==
Incumbent Republican governor Eddie Baza Calvo was barred from re-election, after his win in 2014, since Guam does not allow governors more than two consecutive terms. Five candidates officially declared their bids to be the next governor of Guam:

- Senator Frank B. Aguon, 24th-33rd, currently serving in the 34th Guam Legislature
- Former senator Lou Leon Guerrero, 23rd-24th, 26th-28th Guam Legislature
- Ray Tenorio, incumbent lieutenant governor

=== Primary elections ===
A primary election was held to determine each party's gubernatorial candidates.

==== Democratic primary results ====
Four gubernatorial tickets faced off in the Democratic primaries. The Democratic ticket of Leon Guerrero/Tenorio received the highest number of votes, and moved on to challenge the Republican Tenorio/Ada ticket in November.

Democratic primary results for governor of Guam
Party	Candidate	Votes	%
Democratic	Lou Leon Guerrero and Josh Tenorio	8,267	32.14
Democratic	Frank Aguon and Alicia Limtiaco	7,995	31.12
Democratic	Carl Gutierrez and Fred Bordallo	5,609	21.94
Democratic	Dennis Rodriguez Jr. and Dave Cruz	3,761	14.71

==== Republican primary results ====
The Tenorio/Ada ticket was unopposed for the Republican primaries and moved on to the general election.

Republican primary results for governor of Guam
Party	Candidate	Votes	%
Republican	Ray Tenorio and Tony Ada	3,158	97.98

=== General election results ===
General election results for governor of Guam
Party	Candidate	Votes	%
Democratic	Lou Leon Guerrero and Josh Tenorio	18,081	50.70%
Republican	Ray Tenorio and Tony Ada	9,419	26.41%
Democratic	Frank Aguon and Alicia Limtiaco (write-in)	8,161	22.88%

== United States House of Representatives ==
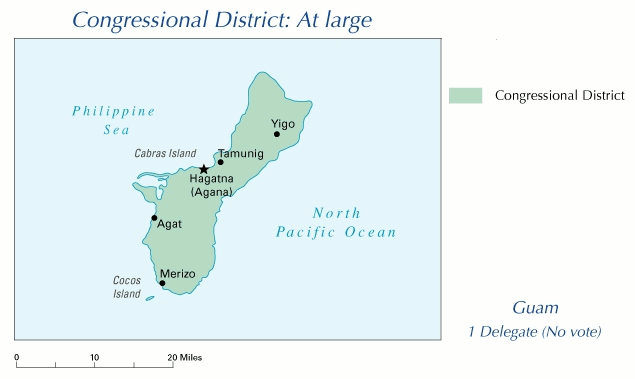
Guam's at-large congressional district

Democratic candidate Michael San Nicolas attained nearly 55% of the total votes against Republican challenger Doris Flores Brookes, who attained 43.98%. San Nicolas was Guam's 5th delegate to the United States House of Representatives.

=== Primary elections ===
==== Democratic primary results ====
Incumbent delegate Madeleine Bordallo and senator Michael San Nicolas faced off in the Democratic primaries.

Democratic primary results for delegate to the U.S. House of Representatives
Party	Candidate	Votes	%
Democratic	Michael San Nicolas	12,456	51.48
Democratic	Madeleine Bordallo	11,635	48.08

==== Republican primary results ====
One Republican declared their bid for Guam's delegate seat in the United States House of Representatives. Former public auditor Doris Flores-Brooks resigned from her post to run for Guam's congressional seat.

Republican primary results for delegate to the U.S. House of Representatives
Party	Candidate	Votes	%
Republican	Doris Flores Brooks	2,817	99.12

=== General election results ===
General election results for delegate to the U.S. House of Representatives
Party	Candidate	Votes	%
Democratic	Michael San Nicolas	19,053	54.90
Republican	Doris Flores Brooks	15,263	43.98

== Attorney General ==
2018 Guam Attorney General election

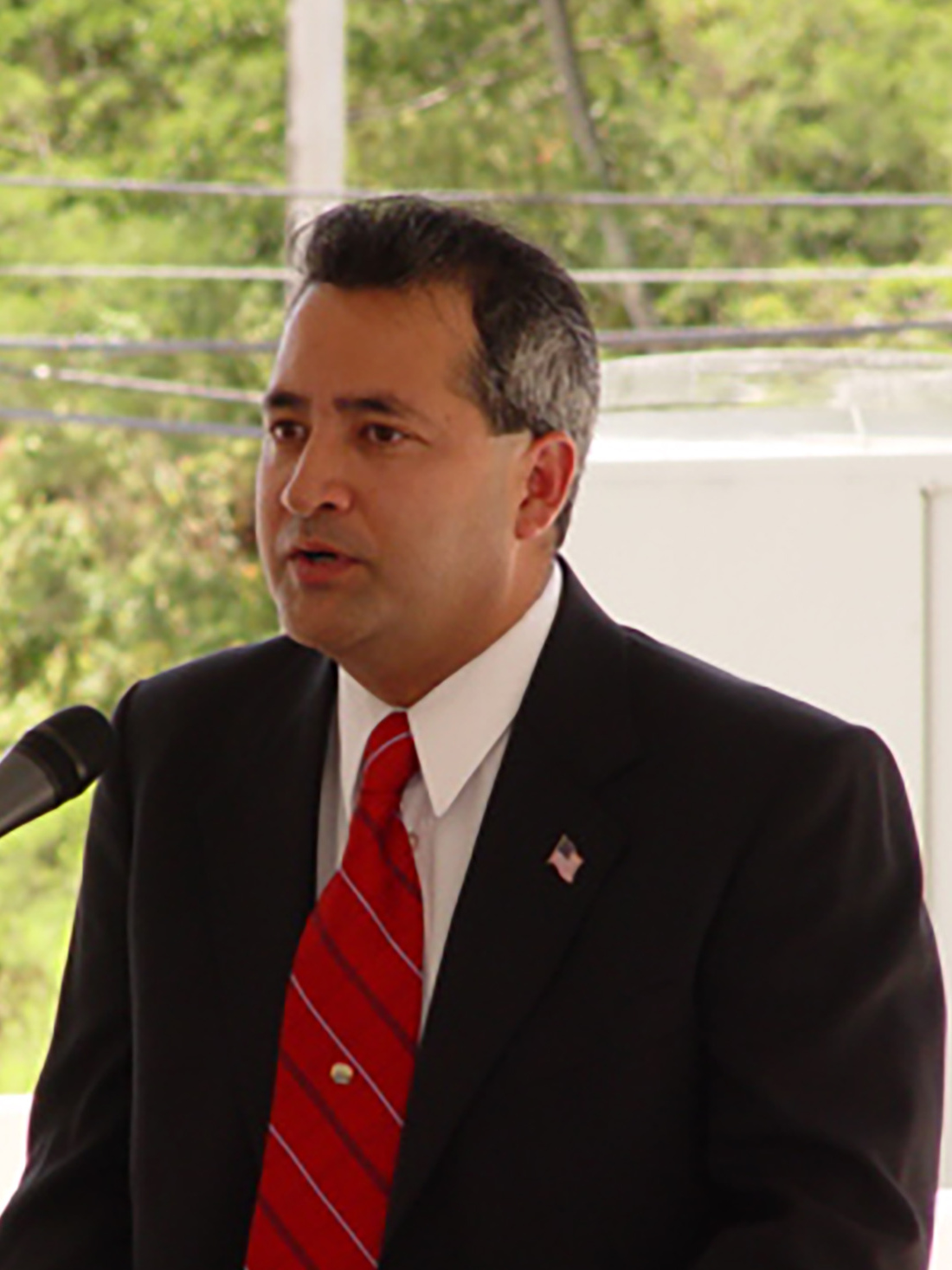
Candidate	Leevin Camacho	Douglas Moylan
Party	Independent	Republican
Popular vote	23,802	11,344
Percentage	67.72%	32.28%
- Results by village Camacho: 60–70% 70–80%
Attorney general before election
Elizabeth Barrett-Anderson
Republican
Elected Attorney general
Leevin Camacho
Independent

Incumbent Elizabeth Barrett-Anderson did not run for re-election as Guam's elected attorney general. Three candidates vied for the non-partisan position: former Democratic lieutenant governor candidate Gary Gumataotao, first elected attorney general Douglas Moylan, and attorney Leevin Camacho. The top two moved on from the blanket primary to the general election.

=== Primary results ===
Candidate	Votes	%
Leevin Camacho (I)	14,284	48.35
Douglas Moylan (R)	7,915	26.79
Gary Gumataotao (D)	7,260	24.57
Write-in	86	0.29
Total	29,545	100.00

=== General election results ===
General election results for Attorney General of Guam
Party	Candidate	Votes	%
Independent	Leevin Camacho	23,802	67.72%
Republican	Douglas Moylan	11,344	32.28%

== Public auditor ==
Guam's first elected non-partisan public auditor, Doris Flores Brookes, was elected to her fourth term in 2016. Flores Brookes recently resigned from her post to run for Guam's delegate seat in the U.S. House of Representatives. Three candidates declared their bids in the special election to be Guam's next public auditor: professor Doreen Crisostomo, incumbent speaker Benjamin Cruz, and acting public auditor Yukari Hechanova. Hachanova withdrew prior to the election, though her name remained on the ballot. Incumbent speaker Benjamin Cruz was elected as Guam's next public auditor after a special election was held coinciding with the August 25 primaries.

=== Special election results ===
Candidate	Votes	%
Benjamin Cruz (D)	14,046	47.57
Doreen Crisostomo (I)	9,130	30.92
Yukari Hechanova (R)	6,303	21.35
Invalid/blank votes	48	0.16
Total	29,527	100.00

== Legislature of Guam ==
2018 Guam legislative election
- November 6, 2018

All 15 seats of the Legislature of Guam
	Majority party	Minority party
Leader	Benjamin Cruz	James Espaldon
Party	Democratic	Republican
Leader's seat	At-large district	At-large district
Seats before	9	6
Seats won	10	5
Seat change	▲1	▼1
Speaker before election
Benjamin Cruz
Democratic
Elected Speaker
Tina Muña Barnes
Democratic

All fifteen seats in the Legislature of Guam were up for election. Democrats, under Speaker Benjamin Cruz, controlled nine seats in the legislature, while Republicans held six seats.

Six incumbent seats were up for grabs, with two senators seeking the gubernatorial seat, one seeking the delegate to the United States House of Representatives seat, and three senators not seeking re-election to the 35th Guam Legislature.

== Consolidated Commission on Utilities ==
Two incumbents, Simon A. Sanchez II and Francis E. Santos, ran for re-election, and one incumbent, Joseph George Bamba, did not run for re-election as Guam elected CCU. Two candidates vied for the non-partisan position: former Republican senator Michael Limtiaco, and former senatorial candidate William Parkinson both ran.

=== General election results ===
2018 Consolidated Commission on Utilities results
Party	Candidate	Votes	%
Nonpartisan	Simon A. Sanchez II (incumbent)	19,827	
Nonpartisan	Michael Troy Limtiaco	16,829	
Nonpartisan	Francis E. Santos (incumbent)	14,816	
Nonpartisan	William A. Parkinson	12,554	

== Education board ==
Four members of the education board were elected.

== Judicial retention elections ==
One Supreme Court associate justice, Katherine A. Maraman, and one Superior Court judge, Anita A. Sukola, were up for retention.
