= Limtiaco =

Limtiaco is a surname. Notable people with the surname include:

- Alicia Limtiaco (born 1964), U.S. district attorney
- Tasi Limtiaco (born 1994), Micronesian swimmer
