= Douglas Moylan =

Guamanian politician (born 1966)

Doug Moylan
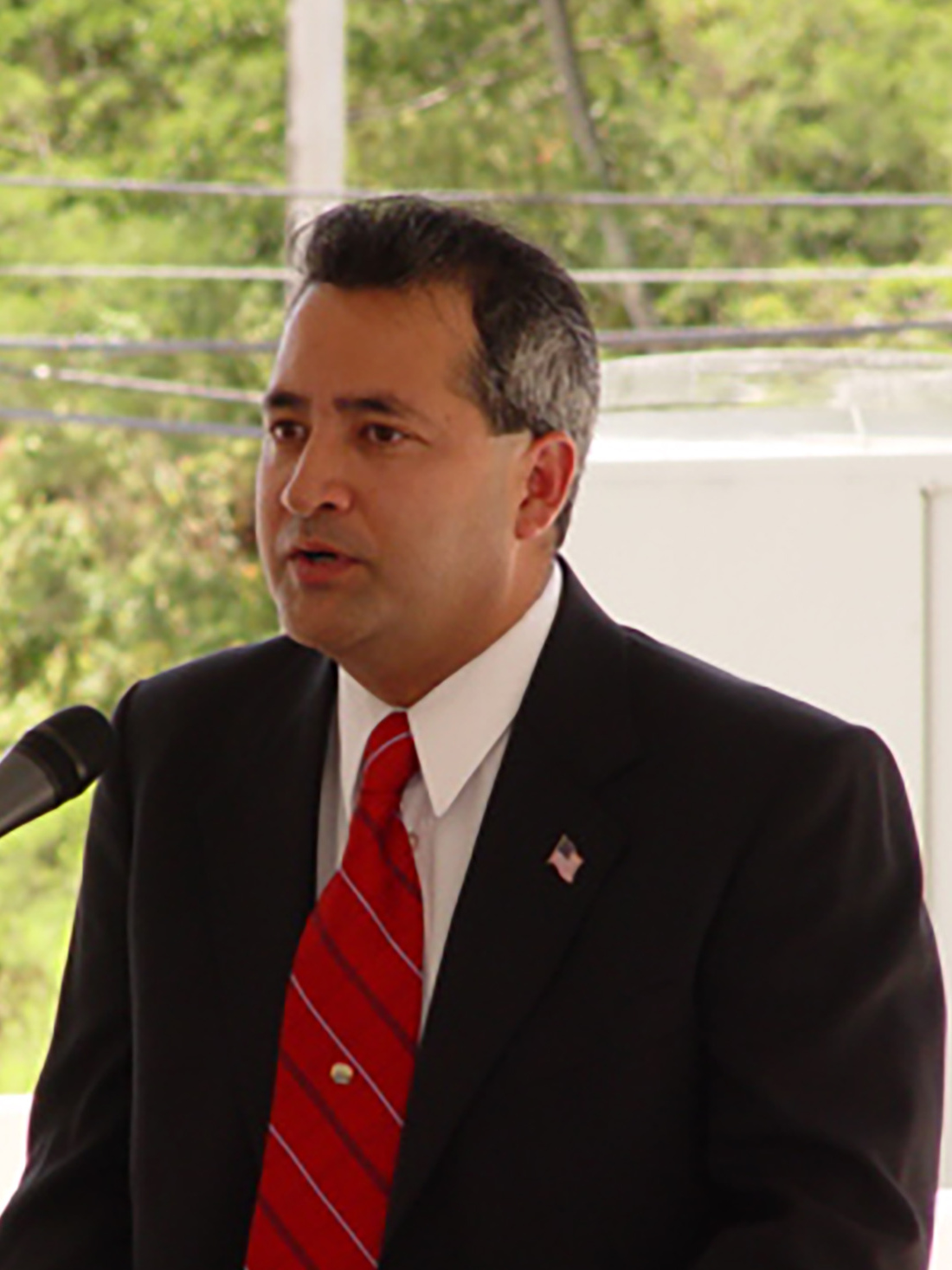
- Moylan in 2005

Attorney General of Guam
- Incumbent
- Assumed office January 2, 2023
- Governor: Lou Leon Guerrero
- Preceded by: Leevin Camacho
- In office January 6, 2003 – January 3, 2007
- Governor: Felix Perez Camacho
- Preceded by: John Tatantino
- Succeeded by: Alicia Limtiaco

Personal details
- Born: Douglas Brian Keola Moylan; October 19, 1966 (age 60) Stockton, California, U.S.
- Party: Republican
- Children: 3
- Education: University of Notre Dame (BA); Santa Clara University (JD)

Douglas Brian Keola Moylan (born October 19, 1966) is an American politician and lawyer serving as the 1st and 6th democratically-elected Attorney General for the United States territory of Guam. A member of the Republican Party, he previously served as the 1st elected attorney general of Guam from 2003 to 2007.

In 1990, Moylan was licensed to practice law in California and he has been in active practice since. In 2002, he became Guam's first elected attorney general. In 2022, Moylan ran for election for a second, non-consecutive term, defeating incumbent Leevin Camacho. In 2026, Moylan ran for election for a third, non-consecutive term, losing to former chief prosecutor Phil Tydingco.

== Biography ==
He was born on October 19, 1966, in Stockton, California, to Richard and Jane Moylan and has four brothers Jeffrey, Scott, Brian and Steven. Moylan is the grandson of the late Scotty Moylan, a businessman. His first cousins are former lieutenant governor Kaleo Moylan and Kamaka Moylan Alston a realtor. Moylan is an attorney licensed to practice law in California, Guam and Washington, D.C. He served as the Legislative Counsel to the 24th, 25th and 26th Guam Legislatures before becoming Guam's first elected Attorney General in January 2003, for a 4-year term. He also served several terms as a Guam Election Commission board member, appointed by Guam's Republican Party to hold 1 of 3 Republican slots.

While he was Attorney General, in 2003 the Government of Guam attempted to borrow over $350 million which Moylan considered a violation of the debt limitation provisions of the Guam Organic Act of 1950. The Supreme Court of Guam was asked to decide the issue by Governor Felix Perez Camacho. When the Guam Supreme Court rejected Moylan's legal position, he appealed their decision to the Ninth Circuit Court of Appeals under the Ninth Circuit's discretionary review authority. The Ninth Circuit granted Moylan's writ of certiorari request. After oral argument, a change in federal law deprived the Ninth Circuit of jurisdiction. Moylan then filed a writ of certiorari in the U.S. Supreme Court, which agreed to hear his appeal in 2006. The U.S. Supreme Court reversed the Supreme Court of Guam and ruled in Moylan's favor in 2007 in Limtiaco v. Camacho, after his term expired in December 2006.

Moylan ran unsuccessfully for senator in the Guam Legislature with the Republican party in 2008 and 2010 elections.

Moylan ran unsuccessfully for re-election as Guam's next Attorney General in the 2018 election. The other candidate was Leevin Camacho.

Moylan ran successfully for re-election as Guam's next Attorney General in the 2022 election, the rematch candidate was Leevin Camacho.

Moylan ran unsuccessfully for re-election as Guam's current Attorney General in the 2026 election. The other candidate was his challenger Phil Tydingco who won, along with unsuccessful candidates are Tom Fisher, Peter Santos and Joardon Pauluhn.

== Education ==
Moylan graduated from the University of Notre Dame in 1988 with Bachelors in Business Administration & Sociology degrees. He earned his JD from Santa Clara University School of Law in 1991.

Legal offices
Preceded by John Tatantino	Attorney General of Guam; 2003–2007	Succeeded by Alicia Limtiaco
Preceded by Leevin Camacho	Attorney General of Guam; 2023–present	Incumbent
