= Doris F. Brooks =

Guamanian accountant, bank executive and politician

Doris Brooks

Auditor of Guam
- In office January 2001 – June 8, 2018
- Governor: Carl Gutierrez; Felix Perez Camacho; Eddie Calvo
- Preceded by: Sonny Shelton
- Succeeded by: Yukari Hechanova (Acting)

Member of the Guam Legislature
- In office January 2, 1989 – January 2, 1995

Personal details
- Born: Doris Flores
- Party: Republican
- Spouse: James Brooks
- Children: 1, 4 stepchildren
- Education: San Jose State University (BS); Harvard University (MBA)

Doris Flores-Brooks is a Guamanian accountant, former bank executive and politician. Brooks is a former Republican senator in the Guam Legislature from 1989 to 1994. Brooks is known for being the first Chamorro to be a Certified Public Accountant. Brooks is also known for being Guam's first elected Public Auditor.

== Education ==
Brooks earned a Bachelor of Science degree from San Jose State University. Brooks earned an MBA from Harvard Business School.

== Career ==
Brooks became the first Chamorro to be a Certified Public Accountant.

Brooks is a former vice president and chief financial officer of the Bank of Guam.

In November 1988, Brooks won the election and became a Republican senator in the Guam Legislature. Brooks served her first term on January 2, 1989, in the 20th Guam Legislature. Brooks served her second term on January 7, 1991, in the 21st Guam Legislature. Brooks served her third term on January 4, 1993, in the 22nd Guam Legislature, which ended on January 2, 1995.

In November 1994, Brooks lost the election as Lieutenant Governor of Guam. Brooks was defeated by Madeleine Z. Bordallo with 54.83% of the votes.

In November 2000, Brooks won the election and became Guam's first elected Public Auditor with Office of the Public Auditor (renamed The Office of Public Accountability). Brooks served as a Public Auditor from 2001 to 2018. Brooks resigned as Public Auditor on June 8, 2018. Brooks was succeeded by Yukari Hechanova, the Deputy Public Auditor, until a new Public Auditor is elected.

On November 6, 2018, Brooks lost the election as a Guam Delegate to the U.S. Congress. Brooks was defeated by Michael San Nicolas with 54.85% of the votes.

In 2019, Brooks was appointed by Guam Governor Lou Leon Guerrero to the Public Utilities Commission. In 2019 at the national level, Brooks was appointed by President Donald J. Trump as a Commissioner of President's Advisory Commission on Asian Americans and Pacific Islanders.

== Awards ==
- 1986 Executive of the Year. Presented by Guam Business Magazine.

== Personal life ==
Brooks' husband is James S. Brooks, an attorney. They have one son. Brooks also has four step-children. Brooks and her family live in Piti, Guam.

== See also ==
- Jack Abramoff Guam investigation

Political offices
| Preceded by Sonny Shelton | Auditor of Guam; 2001–2018 | Succeeded by Yukari Hechanova; Acting |
