= Michael San Nicolas =

Guamanian politician (born 1981)

Mike San Nicolas
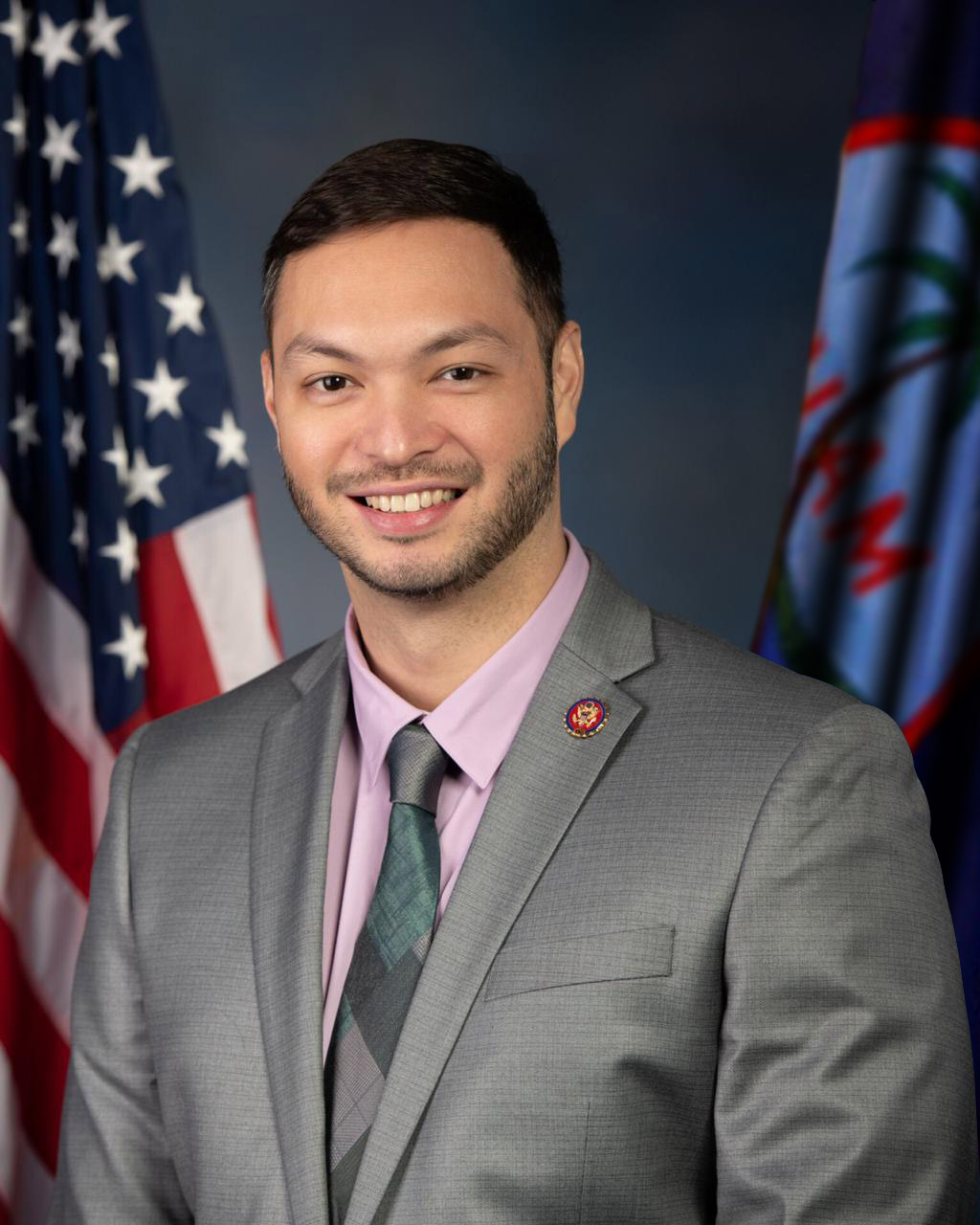
- Official portrait, 2019

Delegate to the U.S. House of Representatives from Guam's at-large district
- In office January 3, 2019 – January 3, 2023
- Preceded by: Madeleine Bordallo
- Succeeded by: James Moylan

Member of the Guam Legislature
- In office January 7, 2013 – January 3, 2019

Personal details
- Born: Michael Franklin Quitugua San Nicolas; January 30, 1981 (age 45) Talofofo, Guam, U.S.
- Party: Democratic
- Spouse: Kathryn Santos Ko (m. 2005)
- Children: 2
- Education: University of Guam (BA)

Michael Franklin Quitugua San Nicolas (born January 30, 1981) is a Guamanian Democratic Party politician, who served as the delegate to the U.S. House of Representatives for Guam's at-large congressional district from 2019 to 2023. San Nicolas was elected by his colleagues in the 116th United States Congress to serve as vice chair of the United States House Committee on Financial Services. Rather than run for reelection in 2022, San Nicolas ran and lost in the Democratic primary of the 2022 Guamanian gubernatorial election. From 2013 to 2019, San Nicolas served as senator in the 32nd, 33rd, and 34th Guam legislatures.

== Early life ==
San Nicolas, born January 30, 1981, in Tamuning, Guam. He is the eldest son of Miguel Borja San Nicolas and Eva Quitugua San Nicolas of Talofofo, Guam, both long-time educators at the Guam Department of Education. His paternal grandfather Enrique Santos San Nicolas served in the Guam Congress and his maternal grandfather is former Speaker of the Guam Legislature Franklin Joseph Arceo Quitugua. He is the great grandson of Ignacio Perez Quitugua, who served in the 1st to 9th Guam Legislatures.

San Nicolas attended Father Dueñas Memorial School, John F. Kennedy High School, and Southern High School, graduating from the latter. San Nicolas met his future wife, Kathryn Santos Ko, while attending John F. Kennedy High School. They married in 2005, and together have two children.

In November 1998, President Bill Clinton visited Guam and delivered a speech to a large rally gathered at Adelup. As a youth speaker, San Nicolas introduced President Clinton to the attendees.

San Nicolas studied history at the University of Guam. While attending the university, he served as Speaker of the 22nd Guam Youth Congress from 1998 to 2000 and elected by his peers as President of the Student Government Association in 2002–2003. He received a Bachelor of Arts degree from the University of Guam in 2004.

Prior to running for the legislature in 2012, San Nicolas had worked as Chief of Staff for Senator Carmen Fernandez in the 27th Guam Legislature and subsequently as Assistant Vice President and Financial Adviser at the Bank of Guam.

== Guam legislature ==
=== Elections ===
San Nicolas ran for senator in the Guam Legislature as a Democrat in 2012. He placed 8th in the primary election with 6,570 votes and advanced to the general election, where he placed 5th with 16,625 votes, winning a seat in the incoming 32nd Guam Legislature. San Nicolas served three consecutive terms in the Guam Legislature before becoming Guam's At-Large Congressional Delegate in 2019.

Election	Guam Legislature	Primary Rank (Votes)	General Rank (Votes)	Result
2012	32nd Guam Legislature	8 (6,570)	5 (16,625)	Elected
2014	33rd Guam Legislature	5 (5,974)	10 (16,738)	Re-elected
2016	34th Guam Legislature	2 (9,414)	2 (19,686)	Re-elected

=== Committee leadership ===
San Nicolas served as Chairman of a number of committees during his tenure in the Guam Legislature, including the Aviation, Ground Transportation, Regulatory Concerns and Future Generations in the 32nd Guam Legislature, the Committee on Finance & Taxation, General Government Operations, and Youth Development in the 33rd Guam Legislature, the Committee on Rules in the first year of the 34th Guam Legislature, and the Committee on General Government Operations and Federal, Foreign, & Regional Affairs in the 34th Guam Legislature.

Guam Legislature	Term	Position	Committee
32nd Guam Legislature	2013-2015	Chairman	Committee on Aviation, Ground Transportation, Regulatory Concerns and Future Generations
33rd Guam Legislature	2015-2017	Chairman	Committee on Finance & Taxation, General Government Operations, and Youth Development
34th Guam Legislature	2017	Chairman	Committee on Rules
34th Guam Legislature	2017-2019	Chairman	Committee on General Government Operations and Federal, Foreign, & Regional Affairs

=== Actions taken in the Guam legislature ===
==== Repealing pay increases for elected and appointed officials ====
After the 2014 general election acting Governor Ray Tenorio introduced a bill to increase salaries of elected and appointed officials retroactively. The bill was passed by the legislature in San Nicolas' absence. In December, San Nicolas introduced a bill to repeal the raises, which failed passage. Starting later that month, San Nicolas began to donate the pay increase to local charities.

San Nicolas introduced a bill in 2015 to repeal the elected and appointed officials' pay raises, among other related matters. The bill was enacted, but the provision repealing the pay raises was removed before passage. San Nicolas revisited repealing the pay raises for elected and appointed officials by introducing a new bill later in the year, but it failed passage in November. The Guam Legislature reconsidered and passed the new bill in January 2016. Governor Calvo vetoed the new bill. An attempted override of the new bill failed.

Senator San Nicolas introduced a bill in 2017, which would reduce the salaries of elected and appointed officials that had been raised by Public Law 32-208. A similar measure, which affected only the salaries of the attorney general, the public auditor, the governor, the lieutenant governor, and members of the Guam Legislature was introduced days prior was passed by the legislature in March, vetoed by Governor Calvo, then was overridden by the legislature in May.

==== Federal affairs ====
In May 2014, San Nicolas introduced a resolution to request that Congresswoman Madeleine Z. Bordallo introduce legislation to the United States Congress to allow government of Guam employees to be covered under Social Security. In June, the resolution passed with the unanimous support of the Guam Legislature. In April 2015, Senator San Nicolas met with professionals in the Social Security Administration and the Staff Director of Rep. Xavier Becerra (D-CA) Ranking Member of the Subcommittee on Social Security to secure a path to providing Social Security benefits to government of Guam workers.

Senator San Nicolas introduced Resolutions No. 63-34 (COR), 64-34 (COR), and 65-34 (COR) in 2017, which each seek to improve Section 30 tax collections, which were adopted.

In 2017, San Nicolas introduced Resolution No. 215-34 (COR), which requests the Federal Trade Commission to review the trade practices and market concentration in Guam's fuel market, which passed unanimously.

==== Other initiatives ====
In March 2014, San Nicolas introduced a bill to allow foster children to be included in the government of Guam's group health insurance, expanding their treatment options. On October 3, the bill was passed by the Guam Legislature.

== Delegate to the U.S. House of Representatives ==
=== Elections ===
In November 2017, San Nicolas announced his intention to become the 2018 general election candidate of the Democratic Party of Guam to serve as the Guam Delegate to the U.S. House of Representatives in the 116th U.S. Congress. He defeated eight-term incumbent Guam Congressional Delegate Madeleine Z. Bordallo in the Democratic primary election in August by 3.4% of the vote, advancing to the general election in November. He defeated Republican Party candidate Doris F. Brooks in the General Election in November.

In 2020, San Nicolas was re-elected. Due to the COVID-19 pandemic, Guam cancelled party primaries and all qualified candidates appeared on the November 3 general election ballot. San Nicolas came in first in a three-way race against former Guamanian delegate to Congress Democrat Robert A. Underwood and Republican territorial senator Wil Castro, but did not win an outright majority. In the November 17 runoff, San Nicolas defeated Underwood earning more than 59% of the vote.

In February 2024, San Nicolas announced his candidacy for delegate in the November 2024 election. In primary election San Nicolas would challenge Ginger Cruz, environmental activist David Lotz and senator Amanda Shelton.

Election	Congress	Primary	General	Runoff	Results
2018	United States House of Representatives	12,456	19,193	—	Elected
2020	United States House of Representatives	—	13,000	10,467	Re-elected

=== Tenure ===
San Nicolas was sworn in as Guam's Congressional Delegate to the 116th U.S. Congress on January 3, 2019. In March 2021, after Rep. Marjorie Taylor Greene suggested that Guam was a foreign country, San Nicolas brought members of the Guam National Guard to Greene's office.

==== Leadership ====
On May 8, 2019, Congresswoman Maxine Waters, Chairwoman of the House Financial Services Committee of the 116th Congress, announced that San Nicolas was elected to serve as Vice Chair of the House Financial Services Committee.

==== Committee assignments ====
San Nicolas was assigned to the following committees and subcommittees of the U.S. House of Representatives:

- Committee on Financial Services
  - Subcommittee on Investor Protection, Entrepreneurship and Capital Markets
  - Subcommittee on National Security, International Development and Monetary Policy
- Committee on Natural Resources
  - Subcommittee on Indigenous Peoples of the United States
  - Subcommittee on Oversight and Investigations

==== Caucus memberships ====
While in Congress, San Nicolas joined a number of congressional caucuses, including:

- Congressional Asian Pacific American Caucus
- Congressional Hispanic Caucus
- Congressional Caucus on Korea
- Congressional Taiwan Caucus
- Future Forum Caucus
- U.S.-Japan Caucus
- Congressional U.S.-Philippines Friendship Caucus

=== Ethics Investigation ===
Since October 2019, San Nicolas was under investigation by the House Ethics Committee. According to the House Ethics Committee, "The Committee is aware of public allegations that Delegate Michael San Nicolas may have engaged in a sexual relationship with an individual on his congressional staff, converted campaign funds to personal use, and/or accepted improper or excessive campaign contributions." On June 24, 2022, the Committee on Ethics submitted its report to the House of Representatives on the allegations against Michael San Nicolas. The press release from the Committee on Ethics states, "At the completion of its investigation, the ISC unanimously concluded that there was substantial evidence that Delegate San Nicolas: accepted improper excessive campaign contributions; engaged in a conspiracy to hide the proceeds of the illicit campaign contributions; knowingly caused his campaign committee to file false or incomplete reports with the Federal Election Commission; and attempted to improperly influence a witness in connection with this Committee’s investigation. In light of the Delegate’s impending retirement from the House and the potential for expiration of applicable statutes of limitations, the ISC recommended that the Committee refer these allegations to the Department of Justice." No reference to any sexual allegations were validated. As of October 2024, all of the above allegations lapsed the federal statute of limitations as per 2 USC § 455, 18 USC § 3282, 2 USC § 455, 18 USC § 3282, 18 USC § 1505, exonerating Congressman San Nicolas of these allegations and any implied illegality.

== Political positions ==
=== Supplemental Security Income ===
During the 2018 election, San Nicolas proposed that the Supplemental Security Income program should be extended to residents of Guam. San Nicolas introduced the Guam Supplemental Security Income Equality Act on January 3, 2019. Thirty-eight members of the Congressional Hispanic Caucus support the bill.

=== War claims ===
The Guam World War II Loyalty Recognition Act was enacted as a provision of the National Defense Authorization Act for Fiscal Year 2017. The United States Treasury has advised that without further action by the U.S. Congress, claimants would not be able to be paid. San Nicolas has introduced two bills to allow payments to be made to those who have filed war claims, H.R. 1141 and H.R. 1365. H.R. 1365 was reported out of the House Natural Resources Committee unanimously and was passed with unanimous consent by the U.S. House of Representatives on Wednesday, July 24, 2019.

=== Cockfighting in US territories ===
In December 2018, the Agricultural Improvement Act of 2018 extended a federal ban on animal fighting to U.S. Territories, which had previously been excluded, effective a year following enactment. San Nicolas has cosponsored Puerto Rican Resident Commissioner Jenniffer González's bill to repeal the ban, which would affect cockfighting in Guam.

=== Agent Orange and other herbicide exposure in Guam ===
Agent Orange and other herbicides were used for tactical purposes in Vietnam during the Vietnam War. Herbicides related to Agent Orange with known negative health affects are also documented as having been used on Guam during the same period. In recognition of this fact, San Nicolas introduced H.R. 1713 to provide for presumptive herbicide exposure status for veterans seeking health coverage and compensation who served in Guam around the Vietnam War period. This language was successfully enacted as a component of the "Honoring our Pact Act" passed in the 117th Congress.

=== Reimbursement of Earned Income Tax Credit ===
During a meeting of the financial service committee, San Nicolas urged for the U.S. Treasury to reimburse the Government of Guam for payments it has made to individuals claiming the Earned Income Tax Credit (EITC) for the Guam income tax. This matter was successfully codified in the "American Rescue Plan" enacted in the 117th Congress.

=== Financial services ===
During a financial services committee meeting, San Nicolas stated that the territories had been neglected by financial services companies, citing that the website Zillow, which had executives in attendance, does not include Guam in for its offerings for mortgage loans.

San Nicolas asked a number of large financial institutions to explore the possibility of lowering interest rates in rural areas. A number of chief executives of big banks expressed interest in exploring charging lower rates to rural borrowers.

=== Territorial representation in Congress ===
San Nicolas filed bills proposing for the election of single, nonvoting delegates by Guam, American Samoa, the Northern Mariana Islands, Puerto Rico and U.S. Virgin Islands to the U.S. Senate, all for six-year terms. The 2022 version of the bill, H. R. 6941, received the endorsement of the Congressional Hispanic Caucus. San Nicolas also cosponsored legislation in favor of statehood for the District of Columbia and Puerto Rico.

== See also ==
- List of Asian Americans and Pacific Islands Americans in the United States Congress

U.S. House of Representatives
Preceded by Madeleine Bordallo	Delegate to the U.S. House of Representatives from Guam's at-large congressional district 2019–2023	Succeeded by James Moylan
