= 2018 United States House of Representatives election in Guam =

2018 United States House of Representatives of Guam
- November 6, 2018
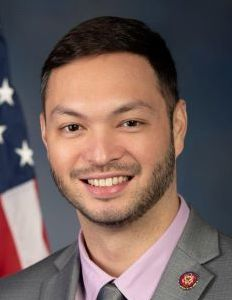

Nominee	Michael San Nicolas	Doris Flores-Brooks
Party	Democratic	Republican
Popular vote	19,193	15,398
Percentage	54.9%	44.0%
- Results by village San Nicolas: 40–50% 50–60% 60–70% Flores-Brooks: 50–60%
Delegate before election
Madeleine Bordallo
Democratic
Elected Delegate
Michael San Nicolas
Democratic

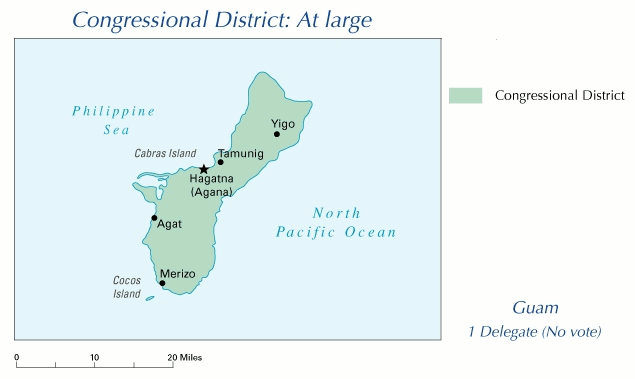
Guam's at-large congressional district

The 2018 United States House of Representatives election in Guam was held on Tuesday, November 6, 2018, to elect the non-voting Delegate to the United States House of Representatives from Guam's at-large congressional district. The election coincided with the elections of other federal and state offices, including the larger 2018 Guamanian general election, the 2018 Guamanian gubernatorial election, and the 2018 United States House of Representatives elections.

The non-voting delegate is elected for a two-year term. Incumbent Democratic Delegate Madeleine Bordallo, who had represented the district since 2003, lost her primary election to Michael San Nicolas, a senator of the Guam Legislature since 2013. San Nicolas was challenged by Republican former public auditor Doris Flores-Brooks for Guam's lone-seat in the United States House of Representatives.

Democratic candidate Michael San Nicolas attained the higher number of votes and took office in January 2019 as Guam's congressional delegate.

== Democratic primary ==
=== Candidates ===
==== Declared ====
- Madeleine Bordallo, incumbent delegate
- Michael San Nicolas, island senator in the Guam Legislature

=== Primary results ===
Democratic primary results
Party	Candidate	Votes	%
Democratic	Michael San Nicolas	12,456	51.48
Democratic	Madeleine Bordallo (incumbent)	11,635	48.08
Democratic	Write-ins	107	0.44
Total votes		24,198	100.0

== Republican primary ==
=== Candidates ===
==== Declared ====
- Doris Flores-Brooks, public auditor

==== Declined ====
- Jonathan Diaz
- Eric Lin

=== Primary results ===
Republican primary results
Party	Candidate	Votes	%
Republican	Doris Flores-Brooks	2,817	99.12
Republican	Write-ins	25	0.88
Total votes		2,842	100.0

== General election ==
=== Results ===
Guam's at-large congressional district, 2018
Party	Candidate	Votes	%	±%
Democratic	Michael San Nicolas	19,193	54.85%	+1.16%
Republican	Doris Flores-Brooks	15,398	44.01%	−1.70%
Write-in		399	1.14%	+0.54%
Total votes		34,990	100.00%	N/A
Democratic hold				
