= 2026 Guam Attorney General election =

American state election

- November 3, 2026

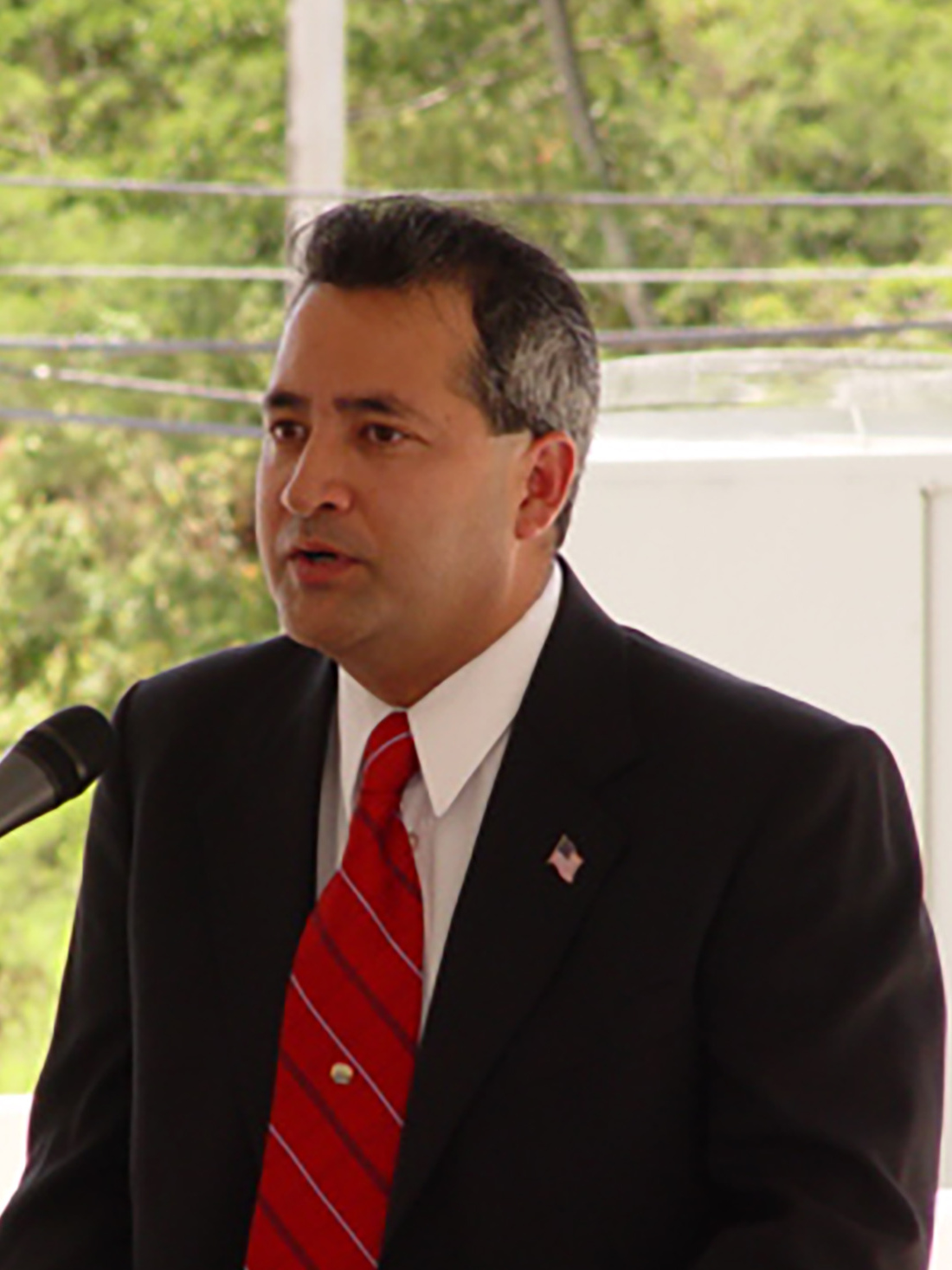

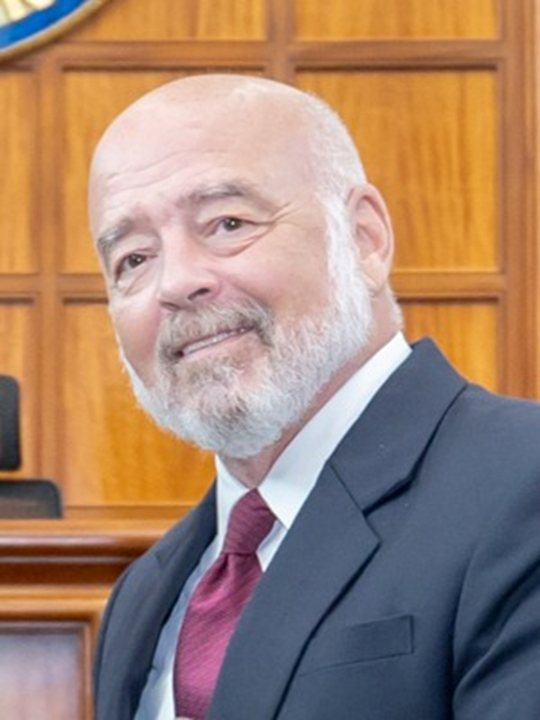

Nominee	Phil Tydingco	Douglas Moylan
Party	Independent	Independent
Alliance		Republican
Popular vote	11,583	10,008
Percentage	38.29%	33.08%
Nominee	Tom Fisher	Pete Santos
Party	Independent	Independent
Alliance	Republican
Popular vote	3,842	3,353
Percentage	12.70%	11.08%
Attorney General before election
Douglas Moylan
Republican
Elected Attorney General
Phil Tydingco
Independent

The 2026 Guam Attorney General election was held on November 3, 2026, to elect the attorney general of Guam. Incumbent attorney general Douglas Moylan sought a second term; but was defeated by challenger Phil Tydingco.

== Candidates ==
=== Declared ===
- Tom Fisher, former territorial legislator
- Douglas Moylan, incumbent attorney general
- Jordan Pauluhn, attorney
- Pete Santos, attorney
- Phil Tydingco, former chief prosecutor for the Guam Attorney General's Office

== General election ==
=== Fundraising ===
Campaign finance reports as of October 23, 2026
Candidate	Raised	Spent
Douglas Moylan (I)	$35,613	$11,914
Tom Fisher (I)	$82,893	$82,893
Jordan Pauluhn (I)	$5,951	$10,471
Pete Santos (I)	$12,145	$11,445
Phil Tydingco (I)	$31,882	$22,735
Source: Guam Election Commission

=== Results ===
2026 Guam Attorney General election
Party	Candidate	Votes	%
Independent	Phil Tydingco	11,583	38.29
Independent	Douglas Moylan (incumbent)	10,008	33.08
Independent	Tom Fisher	3,842	12.70
Independent	Pete Santos	3,353	11.08
Independent	Jordan Pauluhn	1,448	4.79
Write-in		20	0.07
Total votes		30,254	100.00

== See also ==
- 2026 United States attorney general elections
