= John Weisenberger =

Guamanian politician

Attorney General of Guam (Acting)
- In office June 21, 2010 – January 3, 2011
- Governor: Felix Camacho
- Preceded by: Alicia Limtiaco
- Succeeded by: Leonardo Rapadas

Personal details
- Education: Wayne State University (BS, JD)

John Weisenberger is a Guamanian politician and former attorney general of Guam from 2010 to 2011. He was also the public guardian of Guam.

== Education ==
John graduated from Wayne State University in Detroit, Michigan, in 1970. He earned a bachelor's degree in accounting. In 1974, he earned his Juris Doctor degree from the same university. He began practicing law in Michigan in 1974, and then in Guam in 1977.

== Career ==
In January 2001, John Weisenberger was appointed by the Supreme Court of Guam to become the first public guardian of Guam. He served as the public guardian from 2001 to 2008.

=== Attorney general ===
He was appointed as the attorney general on June 21, 2010, to replace Alicia Limtiaco, who departed to become Guam's United States Attorney. He was replaced in January 2011 by Leonardo Rapadas, who was elected in November 2010.

=== Retirement ===
John announced his retirement on December 12, 2014. He was presented with the Ancient Order of the Chamorro by Governor Eddie Calvo shortly after the announcement.

== Personal life ==
John is married to Elizabeth Mandell and they have four children.

He is a Christian.

Legal offices
Preceded by Alicia Limtiaco	Attorney General of Guam; Acting; 2010–2011	Succeeded by Leonardo Rapadas
