= Leonardo Rapadas =

Guamanian lawyer

12th Attorney General of Guam
- In office January 3, 2011 – January 5, 2015
- Governor: Eddie Calvo
- Preceded by: John Weisenberger
- Succeeded by: Elizabeth Barrett-Anderson

United States Attorney for the Districts of Guam and the Northern Mariana Islands
- In office June 2003 – June 2010
- President: George W. Bush; Barack Obama
- Preceded by: Frederick A. Black
- Succeeded by: Alicia Limtiaco

Personal details
- Born: Leonardo Matias Rapadas
- Spouse: Cynthia Cruz
- Children: 2
- Parents: Danilo K. Rapadas (father); Cerila Matias Rapadas (mother)
- Education: Willamette University (JD)
- Profession: Lawyer

Leonardo Matias Rapadas, better known as Lenny Rapadas, is a Guamanian lawyer, who served as the U.S. Attorney for the Districts of Guam and the Northern Mariana Islands from 2003 to 2010 and as the twelfth (third elected) Attorney General of Guam from 2011 to 2015.

== Biography ==
He is the son of Danilo K. Rapadas and Cerila Matias Rapadas. He has three brothers, Danilo Jr., Antonio, and Juan, and three sisters, Roberta, Christina, and Ciony.

Rapadas was nominated by President Bush and confirmed by the Senate as the United States Attorney for Guam and the Northern Mariana Islands, serving from May 2003 until June 2010.

He was elected Guam AG in 2010, replacing John Weisenberger. Rapadas was sworn in on January 3, 2011, in Agana. He failed reelection against Elizabeth Barrett-Anderson by a wide margin in the November 2014 general election.

On 10 January 2016, Rapadas called for the FBI to investigate the controversial retroactive pay raises for the staff of the Guam Governor's office.

== Personal life ==
He is married to Cynthia Cruz has two children and 2 grandchildren.

Legal offices
| Preceded by | United States Attorney for the Districts of Guam and the Northern Mariana Islands; 2003–2010 | Succeeded by Alicia Limtiaco |
| Preceded by John Weisenberger | Attorney General of Guam; 2011–2015 | Succeeded by Elizabeth Barrett-Anderson |
