= United States Attorney for the Districts of Guam and the Northern Mariana Islands =

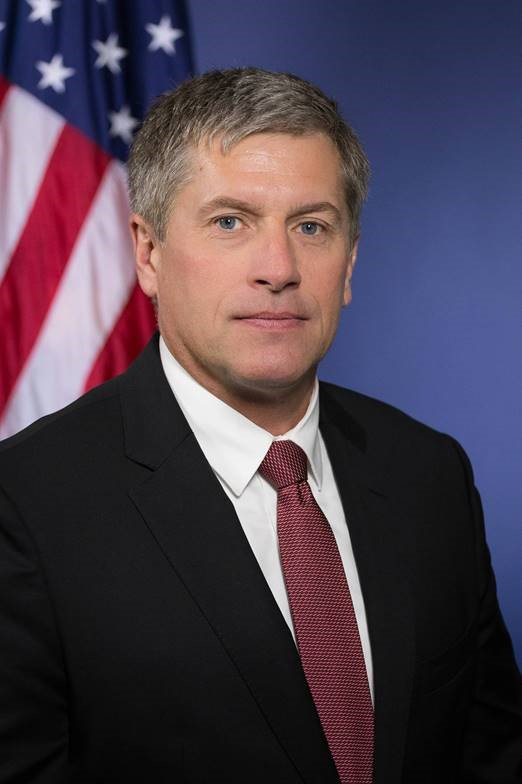
- Incumbent; Shawn N. Anderson since January 4, 2018
- First holder: James G. Mackey
- Website: www.justice.gov/usao-gu

The United States attorney for the Districts of Guam and the Northern Mariana Islands is responsible for representing the federal government in civil and criminal litigation before the United States territorial courts of the District Court of Guam, whose jurisdiction is the Territory of Guam, and the District Court for the Northern Mariana Islands, whose jurisdiction is the United States Commonwealth of the Northern Mariana Islands (CNMI), encompassing the main islands of Saipan, Tinian and Rota as well as the mostly uninhabited "Northern Islands" of the Commonwealth.

Although the Territory of Guam and the CNMI are separate political entities and federal judicial districts, since 1978 the law has authorized the appointment of one United States attorney to serve both. This situation is unique within the entire United States.

The U.S. attorney maintains offices in Hagåtña, Guam, and in Gualo Rai, Saipan.

== List of U.S. attorneys ==
- James G. Mackey: 1950–1952*
- John P. Raker: 1952–1954*
- Herbert G. Homme, Jr.: 1954–1962*
- James Pace Alger: 1962–1969*
- Duane K. Craske: 1969–1975*
- Ralph F. Bagley: 1975–1977*
- David T. Wood: 1977–1986
- K. William O'Connor: 1986–1989
- D. Paul Vernier: 1989–1991
- Frederick A. Black: 1991–2003
- Leonardo Matias Rapadas: June 2003–June 2010
- Alicia Anne Garrido Limtiaco: June 21, 2010–March 10, 2017
- Shawn N. Anderson: January 4, 2018–present

*Prior to 1978, incumbents did not hold both offices, as the latter had not been created.

== See also ==
- District Court of Guam
- District Court for the Northern Mariana Islands
