= 2014 Guam general election =

2014 Guamanian general election
- November 4, 2014
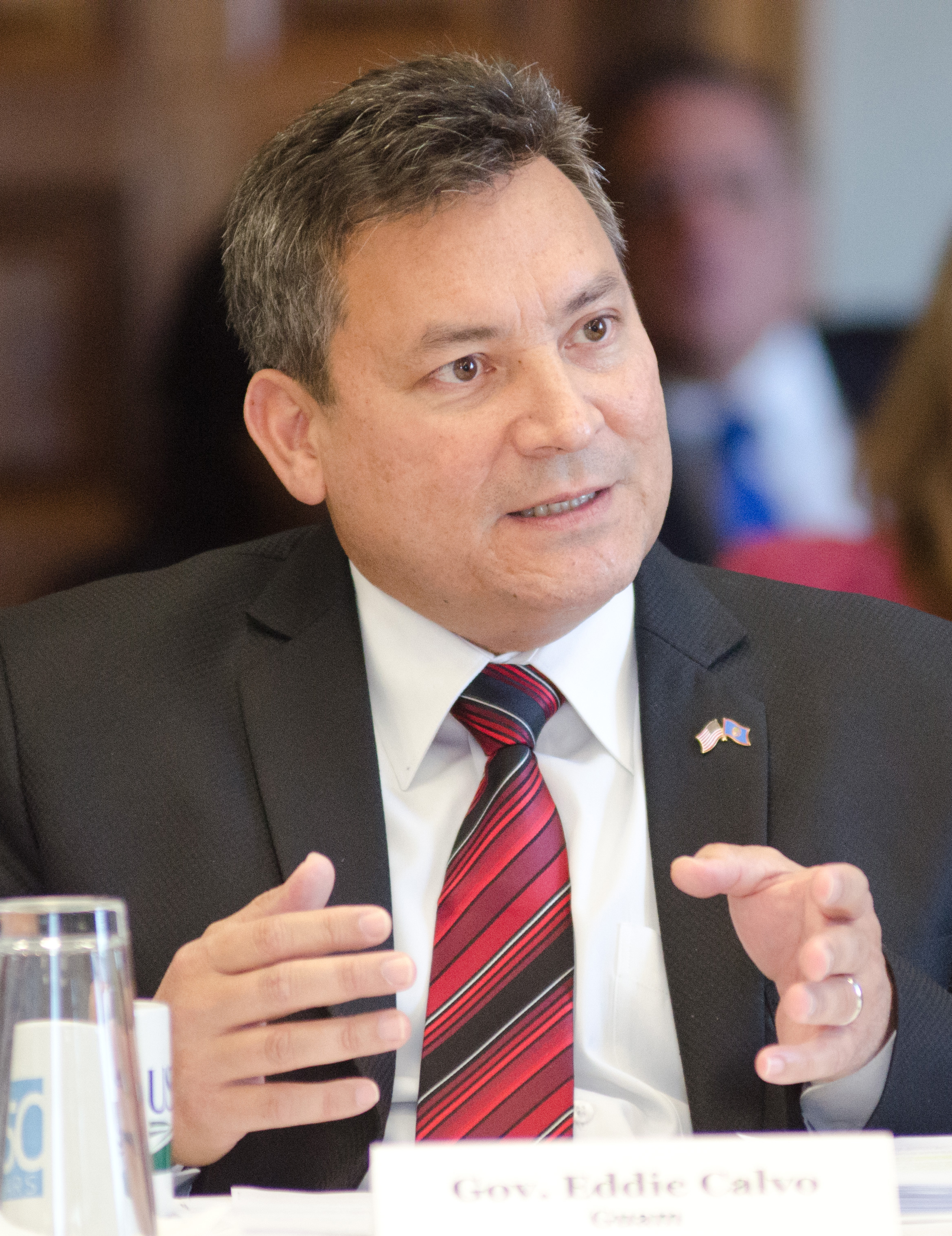

Nominee	Eddie Calvo	Carl T.C. Gutierrez
Party	Republican	Democratic
Running mate	Ray Tenorio	Gary Gumataotao
Popular vote	22,512	12,712
Percentage	63.70%	35.97%
- Calvo: 50-60% 60-70% 70-80%
Governor before election
Eddie Calvo
Republican
Elected Governor
Eddie Calvo
Republican

General elections were held in Guam on November 4, 2014. Voters elected the governor, legislature, and territory's delegate to the United States House of Representatives.

The Democratic and Republican primary elections were held on August 30, 2014.

A referendum was also held on legalization of medical marijuana.

== Candidates for Governor ==
=== Democratic ===
- Former Governor Carl T. C. Gutierrez. Previously served as Governor for two terms from January 2, 1995, until January 6, 2003.
  - Attorney Gary W. F. Gumataotao is Gutierrez running mate.

=== Republican ===
- Current governor Eddie Calvo.
  - Current lieutenant governor Ray Tenorio is Calvo's running mate.

== Candidates for Congressional Delegate ==
=== Democratic ===
- Madeleine Bordallo, incumbent Delegate
- Matthew Pascual Artero, current realtor from Artero Realty.

=== Republican ===
- Margaret Metcalfe, as a Republican National committeewoman.

== Legislature of Guam ==
2014 Guam legislative election
- November 4, 2014

All 15 seats of the Legislature of Guam
	Majority party	Minority party
Leader	Judith T.P. Won Pat	V. Anthony Ada
Party	Democratic	Republican
Leader's seat	At-large district	At-large district
Last election	9 seats	6 seats
Seats won	9	6
Seat change	Steady	Steady
Speaker before election
Judith Won Pat
Democratic
Elected Speaker
Judith Won Pat
Democratic

All fifteen seats in the Legislature of Guam are up for election. Democrats, under Speaker Judith Won Pat, currently control nine seats in the Legislature, while Republicans hold six seats. One incumbent seats and only senators is not seeking re-election was Ben Pangelinan to the 33rd Guam Legislature until he died in the office on July 8, 2014.

== Attorney general candidates ==
Two candidates are seeking election as attorney general, Leonardo Rapadas and retiring Superior Court of Guam judge Elizabeth Barrett-Anderson.

=== Results ===
==== Primary results ====
Attorney General (non-partisan)
Party	Candidate	Votes	%
Nonpartisan	Elizabeth Barrett-Anderson	13,759	65.69
Nonpartisan	Leonardo Rapadas	7,115	33.97
Total votes			

==== General election results ====
Attorney General (non-partisan)
Party	Candidate	Votes	%
Nonpartisan	Elizabeth Barrett-Anderson	23,092	66.57
Nonpartisan	Leonardo Rapadas (incumbent)	11,550	33.29
Total votes		34,690	100

== Consolidated Commission on Utilities candidate ==
Eleven candidates are seeking election as CCU will take three seats.

- Simon A. Sanchez II (I)
- Andrew "Andy" S. Leon Guerrero
- Francis E. Santos
- Earl Joseph Garrido
- Frederick Phil Quinene Tupaz
- William "Bill" H. Hagen
- Benigno Manibusan Palomo (I)
- Joseph George Bamba
- William "Bill" A. Payne Jr.
- Jose S. Servino
- Eloy Perez Hara (I)

== Guam Education Board candidate ==
Nine candidates are seeking election as Guam Education Board will take six seats.

- Peter Alexis D. Ada (I)
- Joseph Cruz Santos
- Lourdes Benavente (I)
- Jose Q. Cruz (I)
- Ronald Ayuyu (I)
- Lourdes B.S. San Nicolas
- Rosie Rivera Tainatongo
- Maria A. Gutierrez (I)
- Albert T. San Agustin (I)

== Judicial retention elections ==
One Supreme Court Associate Justice, Robert J. Torres Jr., and one Superior Court Judge, Michael J. Bordallo, were up for retention.

== General election ==
=== Governor of Guam ===
2014 Guamanian gubernatorial general election
Party	Candidate	Votes	%
Republican	Edward J.B Calvo/Ray Tenorio	22,365	63.69
Democratic	Carl T.C. Gutierrez/Gary W.F. Gumataotao	12,632	35.97
Total votes		35,114	100
Republican hold			

=== US House Delegate ===
2014 Guam Delegate election results
Party	Candidate	Votes	%
Democratic	Madeleine Bordallo	20,550	57.84
Republican	Margaret M. Metcalfe	14,866	41.84
Total votes		35,529	100
Democratic hold			

=== Consolidated Commission on Utilities ===
2020 Consolidated Commission on Utilities results
Party	Candidate	Votes	%
Nonpartisan	Simon A. Sanchez II (incumbent)	17,570	20.86
Nonpartisan	Francis E. Santos	9,754	11.58
Nonpartisan	Joseph George Bamba	8,741	10.38
Nonpartisan	Benigno M. Palomo (incumbent)	8,241	9.78
Nonpartisan	William Hagen	8,178	9.71
Nonpartisan	Eloy P. Hara (incumbent)	7,367	8.75
Nonpartisan	Andrew S. Leon Guerrero	7,255	8.61
Nonpartisan	William M. Payne	4,841	5.75
Nonpartisan	Earl J. Garrido	4,722	5.61
Nonpartisan	Jose S. Servino	4,136	4.91
Nonpartisan	Fredrick P.Q. Tupaz	3,366	4.00
Total votes		84,229	100

=== Guam Education Board ===
2020 Guam Education Board results
Party	Candidate	Votes	%
Nonpartisan	Peter Alexcis D. Ada	21,594	16.11
Nonpartisan	Jose Q. Cruz	16,409	12.83
Nonpartisan	Lourdes B.S. San Nicolas	14,804	11.58
Nonpartisan	Lourdes M. Benavente	14,746	11.53
Nonpartisan	Albert T. San Agustin	14,720	11.51
Nonpartisan	Maria A. Gutierrez	13,367	10.46
Nonpartisan	Rosie Rivera Tainatongo	12,384	9.69
Nonpartisan	Joseph Cruz Santos	11,633	9.10
Nonpartisan	Ronald A. Ayuyu	9,194	7.19
Total votes		127,851	100

=== Referendum ===
Choice	Votes	%
For	19,692	56.48
Against	15,175	43.52
Invalid/blank votes	2,497	–
Total	37,364	100
Registered voters/turnout	51,975	71.89
Source: GEC

== Newcomers ==
=== Attorney General ===
The newcomer is Elizabeth Barrett-Anderson is a former Attorney General, and she was elected on November 4, 2014.

=== Consolidated Commission on Utilities ===
There will be 2 new CCU member were elected on November 4, 2014.

- Francis E. Santos - a former Democratic Senator
- Joseph George Bamba - a former senator and chief of staff from Gov. Calvo and Camacho.

=== Guam Education Board ===
The newcomer is Lourdes San Nicolas where she was elected on November 4, 2014.
