= 2010 Surinamese presidential election =

Election of Dési Bouterse as President of Suriname

← 2005	July 19, 2010	2015 →
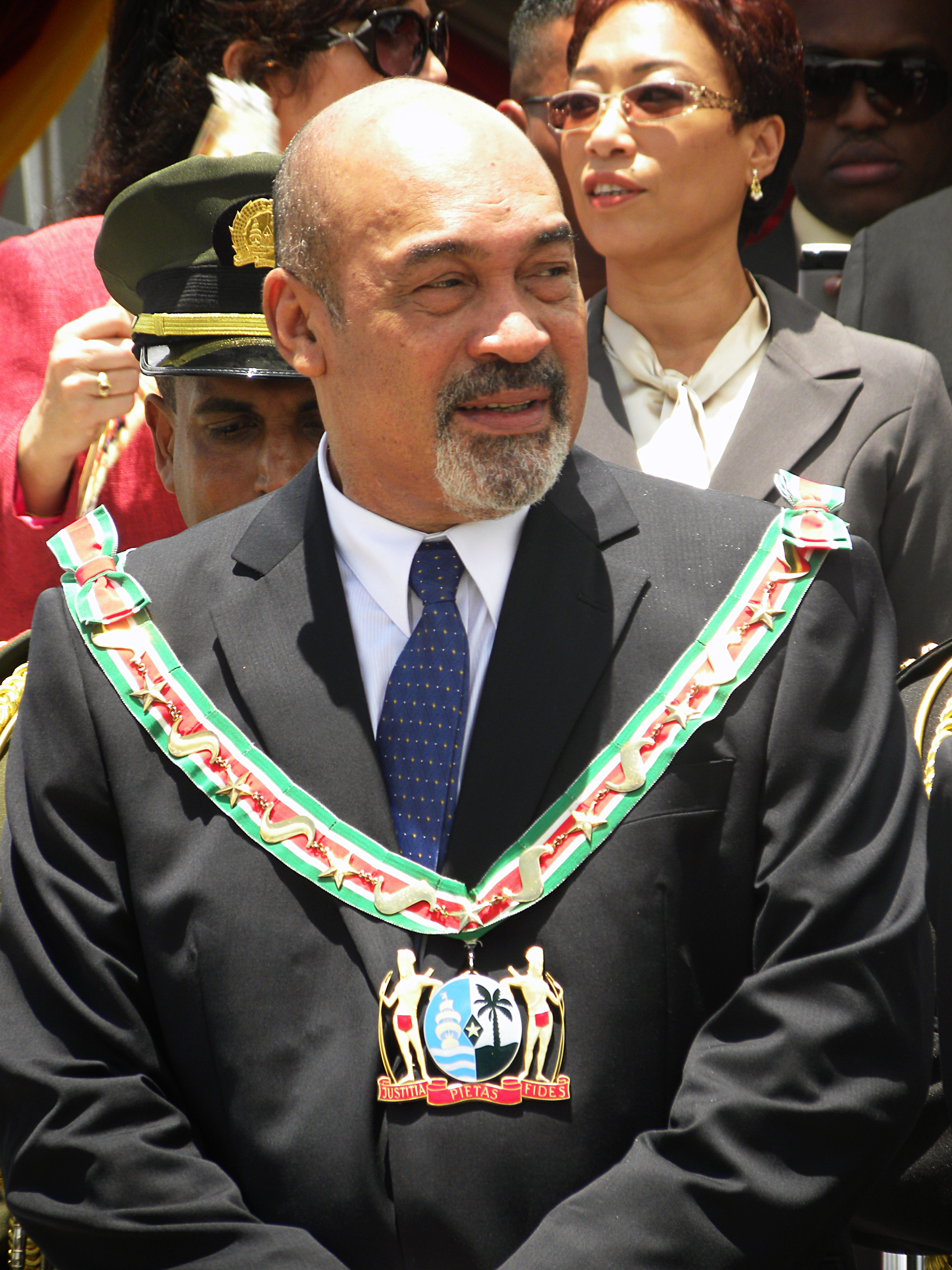

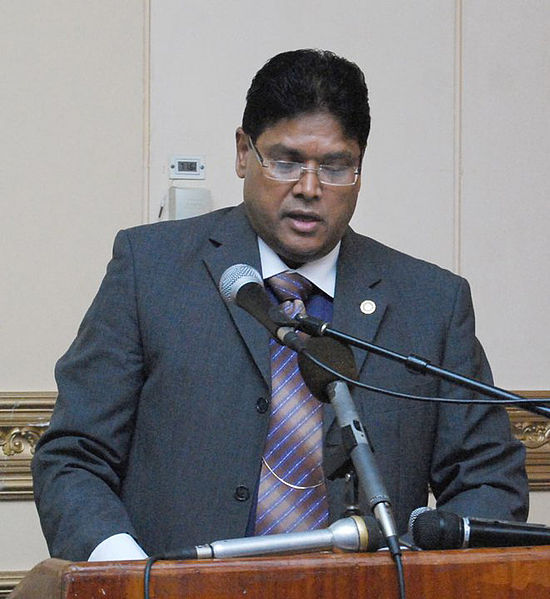
Nominee	Dési Bouterse	Chan Santokhi
Party	National Democratic Party	NFDO
Electoral vote	36	16
Percentage	69.23%	30.77%
President before election
Ronald Venetiaan
NPS
Elected President
Dési Bouterse
National Democratic Party

An indirect presidential election was held in Suriname on 19 July 2010 following the legislative election. If the National Assembly of Suriname twice failed to elect a new president with a two-thirds majority, the election would go to the People's Assembly of Suriname, composed of members of parliament, district and provincial councils, where a simple majority would have sufficed.

A first vote was expected on 8 July 2010, but only procedural issues were discussed at the meeting; the election was set for 19 July 2010 on the following day.

Shortly before the election, former dictator Dési Bouterse succeeded in establishing a coalition with the A Combinatie and the People's Alliance, giving him the votes required for the presidential election. As expected, he gained 36 votes against Chan Santokhi's 13 votes; he was sworn in on 12 August 2010.
