= 2010 Guam general election =

2010 Guamanian general election
- November 2, 2010
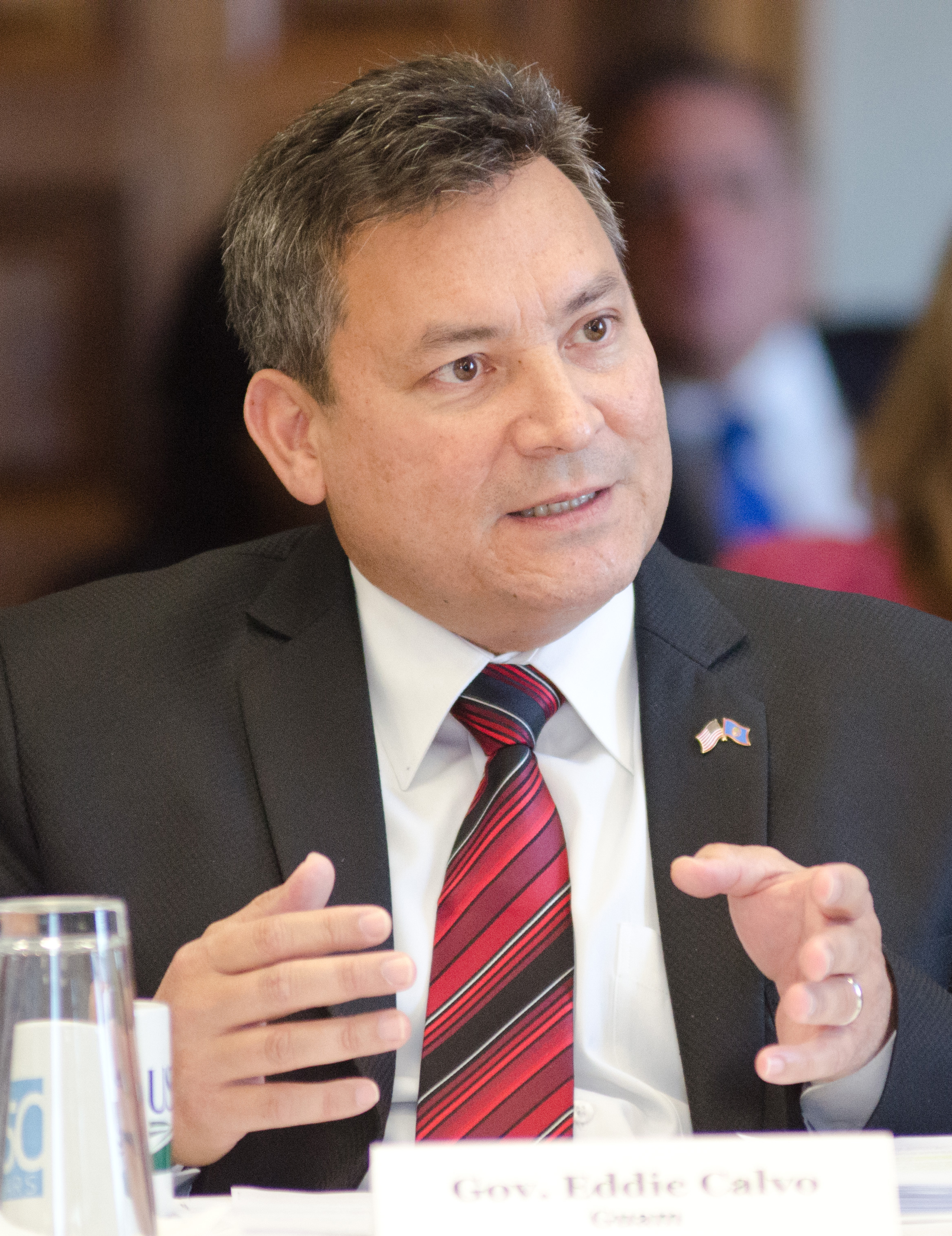

Nominee	Eddie Calvo	Carl T.C. Gutierrez
Party	Republican	Democratic
Running mate	Ray Tenorio	Frank Aguon, Jr.
Popular vote	20,066	19,579
Percentage	50.61%	49.39
Governor before election
Felix Perez Camacho
Republican
Elected Governor
Eddie Calvo
Republican

General elections were held in Guam on November 2, 2010. Voters in Guam chose their Governor, their non-voting delegate to the United States House of Representatives, Attorney General, as well as all fifteen members of the territorial legislature. The election coincided with the 2010 United States elections.

== Governor of Guam ==
Two term incumbent Republican Governor Felix Perez Camacho was term limited and could seek re-election. Former Democratic Governor Carl Gutierrez and his running mate, Frank Aguon, is seeking election against the Republican gubernatorial ticket of Senator Eddie Calvo and his running mate, Ray Tenorio.

== United States House of Representatives ==
Incumbent Delegate Madeleine Bordallo (D) was running unopposed for re-election for Guam's lone at-large congressional seat. She was re-elected unopposed.

== Attorney General ==
Three candidates are seeking election as Attorney General: Gary Gumataotao, Leonardo Rapadas, and William C. Bischoff.

=== Primary election results ===
Attorney General (non-partisan)
Party	Candidate	Votes	%
Nonpartisan	Leonardo Rapadas	15,121	
Nonpartisan	Gary W.F. Gumataotao	8,913	
Independent	William C. Bischoff	3,124	
Total votes			

=== General election results ===
Attorney General (non-partisan)
Party	Candidate	Votes	%
Nonpartisan	Leonardo Rapadas	17,838	
Independent	Gary Gumataotao	13,825	
Total votes			

== Legislature of Guam ==
All fifteen seats in the Legislature of Guam are up for election. Democrats, under Speaker Judith T.P. Won Pat, controlled ten seats in the Legislature before the 2010 election, while Republicans held five seats.

== Vice Mayor of Agat ==
=== Candidates ===
==== Democratic ====
- Former Guam Youth Congress Derick Baza Hills, is a resident of Agat and previously served as Speaker from 2008 to 2010.

==== Republican ====
- Vice Mayor Agustin Quintanilla is running for re-election.
- Joseph Nededog Salas is a current resident of Agat and running for Vice Mayor.

=== Primary Election Results ===
Democratic primary results
Party	Candidate	Votes	%
Democratic	Derick Baza Hills	297	
Total votes			

Republican primary results
Party	Candidate	Votes	%
Republican	Agustin G. Quintanilla	599	
Republican	Joseph N. Salas	329	
Total votes			

=== General Election Results ===
Vice Mayor of Agat results
Party	Candidate	Votes	%
Republican	Agustin G. Quintanilla	984	
Democratic	Derick Baza Hills	788	
Total votes			

== Consolidated Commission on Utilities ==
=== Candidates ===
Three candidates are seeking election as CCU, will have three seats.

- Eloy Perez Hara, current CCU Vice-chair
- Benigno Manibusan Palomo, current CCU Vice-chair
- Simon A. Sanchez II, current CCU Chairman and son of the late former University of Guam President Dr. Pedro C. Sanchez, and the grandson of the late School superintendent Simon A. Sanchez.

=== Results ===
Consolidated Commission on Utilities
Party	Candidate	Votes	%
Nonpartisan	Simon A. Sanchez II (incumbent)	20,496	
Nonpartisan	Benigno M. Palomo (incumbent)	17,025	
Nonpartisan	Eloy P. Hara (incumbent)	14,881	
Total votes			

== Judicial retention elections ==
The Chief Justice of the Supreme Court, F. Philip Carbullido, and one Superior Court Judge, Anita A. Sukola, were up for retention.
