= Jack Abramoff Guam investigation =

The Jack Abramoff Guam investigation involves an alleged plot by lobbyist Jack Abramoff and others to control the functions of the courts in Guam. A federal grand jury investigation was halted in 2002 when the prosecutor was removed from office by the George W. Bush administration.

In 2002, Abramoff was retained as a subcontractor by the Guam Superior Court to lobby against a bill proposing to put the Superior Court under the authority of the Guam Supreme Court. A sum of $324,000 was paid to Abramoff through Laguna Beach, California, lawyer Howard Hills by means of 36 checks of $9,000 each.

On November 18, 2002, a grand jury issued a subpoena demanding that the administrator of the Guam Superior Court release all records relating to the contract. On November 19, 2002, U.S. Attorney Frederick A. Black, the chief prosecutor for Guam and the instigator of the indictment, was unexpectedly demoted and removed from the office he had held since 1991. The federal grand jury investigation was quickly wound down and took no further action.

In May 2003 Black was succeeded by Leonardo Rapadas at the recommendation of the Guam Republican Party. He was confirmed without any debate. Fred Radewagen, a lobbyist who had been under contract to the Gutierrez administration, said he carried that recommendation to top Bush aide Karl Rove in early 2003.

In 2005, Public Auditor Doris Flores Brooks initiated a new investigation of the Abramoff contract, which proceeded. The Jack Abramoff Guam Investigation involved an alleged conspiracy by lobbyist Jack Abramoff, Anthony Sanchez, and others to conceal payments to Abramoff for lobbying against legislation in the U.S. Congress to reorganize the court system in Guam.

In 2002, Abramoff's law firm, Greenberg Traurig, was retained as a subcontractor to Howard Hills, a constitutional lawyer and territorial policy specialist who had been under contract for four years advising the Guam Superior Court on the court reorganization issue. Abramoff's firm was hired by Hills for what was supposed to be a temporary basis at the court's direction to lobby against a bill proposing to put the Superior Court under the authority of the Guam Supreme Court.

The amount of $324,000 was paid by the Court to Abramoff's law firm, the subcontractor, through the prime contractor, Hills, who at the time was a resident of Laguna Beach, California, and a member of the bar in both Washington, D.C., and Guam. The court sent 36 checks of $9,000 each to Hills, with written instructions to pay fees owed by the court to the firm. Hills, trusting the intentions of court official Sanchez, facilitated what he thought was a transitional contract for legitimate services between the court and Grennberg Traurig. If done to avoid the federal reporting requirements for payment transfers, this would constitute illegal 'structuring' under 31 USC 5324(a). The form of payment might also be illegal if it was used to evade federal contracting rules requiring an open tender for contracts over $10,000. However, in 2006 the Inspector General of the U.S. Department of Justice issued a report documenting the finding by FBI investigators that no federal funds were involved and no structuring had been carried out.

Allegations of improper influence in the reassignment of Black and appointment of Rapadas also were addressed in the 2006 report of the U.S. Department of Justice, Office of Inspector General, which concluded Black's allegations of abuse were unfounded, and that Black had used his position to undermine Guam native candidates to replace him.

In 2005, Public Auditor Doris Flores Brooks initiated an investigation of the Abramoff contract and issued a report finding that both the Guam Superior Court and the Guam Supreme Court hired lobbyists in violation of Guam procurement rules, but that the rules did not apply to the courts' lobbying contracts.

However, based on the audit report finding that Superior Court payments to Abramoff's law firm through Hills was intended to circumvent the procurement rules, court administrator Tony Sanchez and Hills were indicted in 2006. Charges against Hills were dismissed after investigations made evident his ethical and non-criminal intentions. Abramoff and the Grennberg Traurig law firm were also indicted in 2006 by the Guam Attorney General Office, and after the law firm paid back the $324,000 which it had received from the court, the entire case was dismissed on February 9, 2009.
