= Elizabeth Barrett-Anderson =

Guamanian lawyer, judge and politician

6th & 13th Attorney General of Guam
- In office January 5, 2015 – January 7, 2019
- Governor: Eddie Calvo
- Preceded by: Leonardo Rapadas
- Succeeded by: Leevin Camacho
- In office July 7, 1987 – July 4, 1994
- Governor: Joseph Franklin Ada
- Preceded by: Jack Avery
- Succeeded by: Calvin Holloway

Personal details
- Born: July 21, 1953 (age 72) Guam, U.S.
- Political party: Republican
- Spouse: Daniel Anderson
- Education: University of San Francisco (BA); Santa Clara University (JD)

Elizabeth Barrett-Anderson (born July 21, 1953) is a Guamanian lawyer, judge, and moderate Republican politician. She served as the sixth and thirteenth (fourth elected) Attorney General of Guam, a U.S. territory, from 1987 to 1994 and from 2015 to 2019. She is the longest-serving (11 years) attorney general in Guamanian history and was the first woman to serve as attorney general.

== Biography ==
Barrett-Anderson is the daughter of Jack Barrett (1917–1987) and Concepcion "Chong" Cruz Barrett (1915–1993), a former senator of the Guam Legislature. Barrett-Anderson earned her B.A. at the University of San Francisco and her J.D. at the University of Santa Clara School of Law. She was the first Chamorro woman to be admitted to practice law in Guam. She operated a private law practice on Guam until she was appointed Attorney General by Governor Joseph Franklin Ada in 1987. She later won election to the office.

She resigned as attorney general in 1994 to run for the Guam Legislature, where she served two terms. In 1997, she was appointed to the Superior Court of Guam by Governor Carl T.C. Gutierrez, and she was confirmed as a judge by the Legislature in 1998.

In 1990, she opposed the enactment of a law restricting abortion to cases in which the life of the mother is threatened. When it passed and became the most restrictive abortion law in the U.S., she said her role had "now shifted to one of law enforcement".

In 2014, twenty years after she left the post of Attorney General, she ran again for the office and won, defeating incumbent Leonardo Rapadas by a wide margin in the November 2014 general election.

In April 2015, Barrett-Anderson ordered the director of the Guam Department of Public Health and Social Services to begin processing same-sex marriage licenses on April 15, 2015, which would have made Guam the first U.S. territory to allow same-sex marriage.

== See also ==
- First women lawyers around the world
- List of female state attorneys general in the United States

Legal offices
Preceded by Jack Avery	Attorney General of Guam; 1987–1994	Succeeded by Calvin Holloway
Preceded by Leonardo Rapadas	Attorney General of Guam; 2015–2019	Succeeded by Leevin Camacho
