= Attorney General of Guam =

Office in the Judiciary of Guam

The Office of the Attorney General of Guam aims to serve, protect, and represent the government and the people by enforcing the laws of Guam and the United States. The Office is composed of the following divisions:

- Administration Division - “The Administration Division is responsible for the business processes of the Office of the Attorney General (OAG) and provides support to all divisions in the areas of personnel, financial management, procurement, payroll, technology, training, records management and federal grants administration.”
- General Crimes Division - “The Attorney General is the Public Prosecutor for the Territory of Guam, and has designated the Criminal Division to prosecute in the name of the People of Guam all criminal cases. The Division prosecutes adult criminal cases involving felonies, misdemeanors, petty misdemeanors, and certain traffic offenses in the Superior Court of Guam, and certain cases in the U.S. District Court of Guam.Criminal cases are investigated and referred for prosecution by the Guam Police Department. Other local agencies, including federal law enforcement, may also refer criminal cases. The Division may investigate criminal offenses on its own, including, but not limited to, sophisticated financial white collar crimes and government/public corruption. The Division prosecutes criminal tax cases in the U.S. District Court of Guam, upon referral by the Department of Revenue & Taxation. The Division also represents the People of Guam in criminal appellate cases brought to the Supreme Court of Guam.”
- Civil Litigation Division - “The Litigation Division defends government of Guam agencies, officials (in their official capacity) and employees (in their official capacity) in civil litigation including suits for declaratory relief, Constitutional challenges to laws and government programs, torts, and employment litigation. The Litigation Division also handles all civil appeals and some criminal appeals.”
- Solicitor Division - “The Solicitor Division provides legal representation, counsel and assistance to the government of Guam and its authorized entities. This includes providing legal advice, answering legal questions posed by government agencies, issuing formal legal opinions and assisting government agencies in the procurement process.The Solicitor Division is also responsible for all matters relative to procurement by the Government of Guam. As part of its responsibility, it assists the OAG in reviewing contracts as to form and legality and advising Government of Guam agencies during all phases of procurement for acquisitions $500,000 or more.”
- Consumer Protection Division (CPD) - “The Consumer Protection Division (CPD) is tasked with enforcing local laws against false, misleading and deceptive practices that are injurious to consumers, while safeguarding, educating and protecting the consumers of Guam through public and community outreaches.”
- Family Division - “The mission of the Family Division is to promote the safety and well-being of our children by bringing justice to individuals who inflict upon them undue harm and danger. Family Division attorneys participate in efforts to strengthen legislation relevant to juveniles, juvenile justice reformation efforts, restorative justice, juvenile drug court, and public educational campaigns to address sexting, bullying, mutual combat and related trends.”
- Child Support Enforcement Division (CSED) - “The mission of the Child Support Enforcement Division (“CSED”) is to assist parents with obtaining the financial support necessary for raising their children, as mandated by both federal and local law. CSED aims to collect and timely distribute child support payments. This is done by establishing paternity of children; establishing and enforcing court orders for financial and medical support; and recovering welfare funds that have been paid on behalf of Guam’s children. Where appropriate, CSED promotes the emotional involvement of both parents in the life of a child. CSED also aims to accomplish these tasks efficiently in order to minimize taxpayer expense while also providing exemplary customer service.”
- Crime Victims’ Response Unit - “The Office of the Attorney General is here to help crime victims and their families by providing information on victims’ rights and protections, the criminal justice process, referrals for counseling, emergency assistance and safety planning.”

== List of attorneys general (1971-present) ==
=== Appointed ===
Gubernatorially appointed through 2002.

Image	Name	Start	End	Governor
	Ben Perez	January 4, 1971	July 3, 1972	Carlos Camacho
	Keith Andrews	July 3, 1972	January 6, 1975	Carlos Camacho
	Charles H. Troutman	January 6, 1975	January 1, 1979	Ricardo Bordallo
	Kenneth E. North	January 1, 1979	July 5, 1982	Paul McDonald Calvo
	Jack Avery	July 5, 1982	July 7, 1987	Paul McDonald Calvo
	Jack Avery	July 5, 1982	July 7, 1987	Ricardo Bordallo
	Elizabeth Barrett-Anderson	July 7, 1987	July 4, 1994	Joseph Franklin Ada
	Calvin E. Holloway	July 4, 1994	July 8, 1996	Joseph Franklin Ada
	Calvin E. Holloway	July 4, 1994	July 8, 1996	Carl Gutierrez
	John F. Tatantino	July 8, 1996	January 6, 2003	Carl Gutierrez

=== Elected ===
Popularly elected since 2003.

Image	Name	Start	End	Governor
	Douglas Moylan	January 6, 2003	January 3, 2007	Felix Perez Camacho
	Alicia Limtiaco	January 3, 2007	June 21, 2010	Felix Perez Camacho
	John Weisenberger	June 21, 2010	January 3, 2011	Felix Perez Camacho
	Leonardo Rapadas	January 3, 2011	January 5, 2015	Eddie Baza Calvo
	Elizabeth Barrett-Anderson	January 5, 2015	January 7, 2019	Eddie Baza Calvo
	Leevin Camacho	January 7, 2019	January 2, 2023	Lou Leon Guerrero
	Douglas Moylan	January 2, 2023	present	Lou Leon Guerrero
	Phil Tydingco	January 4, 2027 (elect)		Vicente Ada (elect)

== See also ==
- Attorney general
- Justice ministry
- Government of Guam
- United States Department of Justice
