= Alicia Limtiaco =

Guamanian politician (born 1963)

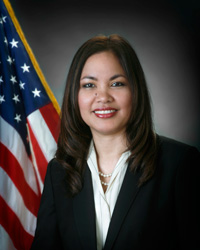
- Official portrait, 2010

Delegate-elect to the U.S. House of Representatives from Guam's at-large district
- Assuming office January 3, 2027
- Succeeding: James Moylan

United States Attorney for the Districts of Guam and the Northern Mariana Islands
- In office June 21, 2010 – March 10, 2017
- President: Barack Obama; Donald Trump
- Preceded by: Leonardo Rapadas
- Succeeded by: Shawn Anderson

10th Attorney General of Guam
- In office January 3, 2007 – June 21, 2010
- Governor: Felix Camacho
- Preceded by: Douglas Moylan
- Succeeded by: John Weisenberger (acting)

Personal details
- Born: Alicia Anne Garrido Limtiaco; August 7, 1963 (age 63) Hagåtña, Guam
- Party: Independent (before 2017); Democratic (2017–present)
- Spouse: Vincent Untalan Munoz
- Children: 1
- Education: University of Southern California (BBA); University of California, Los Angeles (JD)
- Website: Campaign website

Alicia Anne Garrido Limtiaco (born August 7, 1963) is a Guamanian politician and lawyer who is the delegate-elect to the U.S. House of Representatives from Guam's at-large district. She served as United States Attorney for the Districts of Guam and the Northern Mariana Islands. She was sworn in on June 21, 2010, and served until March 10, 2017. She previously served as the 10th Attorney General of Guam, serving from January 3, 2007, to June 21, 2010.

She ran for Guam's at-large congressional district in the 2026 election defeating incumbent Republican delegate James Moylan.

== Early life ==
Alicia Anne Garrido Limtiaco was born August 7, 1963, in Hagåtña, Guam. She attended the University of Southern California, where she earned a BBA, and then the University of California, Los Angeles, School of Law where she earned a juris doctor. She and her husband Vincent have one daughter. While in law school, she was a judicial extern for the United States District Court for the Central District of California. She then worked as a partner in various law firms, as an assistant attorney general in the Attorney General's Office and as an adjunct faculty member at University of Guam and Guam Community College.

== Election ==
=== 2006 election ===
In a three-way race, Limtiaco placed first in the primary with 43% of the vote. In November election, Limtiaco won this race, receiving 21,628 votes (57%) and defeating Vernon Perez (14,444) in the 2006 general election.

While Attorney General, she joined 22 Democrats and one Republican in supporting the creation of the Consumer Financial Protection Bureau.

Attorney General (non-partisan)
Party	Candidate	Votes	%
Independent	Alicia Limtiaco	15,163	43.45
Independent	Vernon Gumataotao Perez	11,559	33.12
Independent	Douglas Moylan	8,118	23.26
Total votes			

Attorney General (non-partisan), run-off
Party	Candidate	Votes	%
Independent	Alicia Limtiaco	21,628	56.04
Independent	Vernon Gumataotao Perez	14,444	37.42
Total votes			

== U.S. Attorney ==
In 2010, Delegate Madeleine Bordallo recommended Limtiaco to President Barack Obama for the position of U.S Attorney. She was sworn in on June 21, 2010. She recommended that her deputy Phil Tydingco succeed her as Guam AG, but Governor Felix Perez Camacho appointed John Weisenberger. She replaced George W. Bush appointee Leonardo Rapadas, who had served since 2003.

== Between terms ==
=== 2018 election ===
Limtiaco ran as a candidate for Lieutenant Governor of Guam in the 2018 gubernatorial election as the running mate of senator Frank Aguon Jr. She lost the primary to Lou Leon Guerrero and Josh Tenorio.

== U.S. House of Representatives ==
=== 2026 election ===
In February 2026, Limtiaco announced her run to become Guam's next congressional delegate in 2026. She faced incumbent Republican delegate James Moylan in the general election. Limtiaco defeated Moylan in the general election by approximately two points, flipping the seat.

== See also ==
- 2017 dismissal of U.S. attorneys

Legal offices
Preceded by Douglas Moylan	Attorney General of Guam; 2007–2010	Succeeded by John Weisenberger; Acting
Preceded by Leonardo Rapadas	United States Attorney for the Districts of Guam and the Northern Mariana Islands; 2010–2017	Succeeded by Shawn Anderson
U.S. House of Representatives
Preceded by James Moylan	Delegate to the U.S. House of Representatives from Guam's at-large congressional district Taking office 2027	Elect
