= Thomas J. Fisher =

Guamanian politician

Tom Fisher
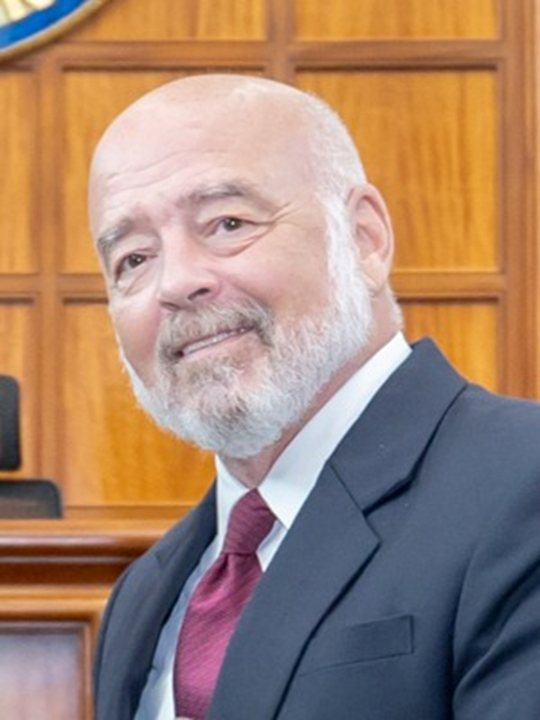
- Fisher in 2024

Member of the Guam Legislature
- In office January 2, 2023 – January 6, 2025

Personal details
- Born: Thomas Joseph Fisher; 1959 or 1960 (age 65–66)
- Party: Republican
- Education: University of Kentucky (JD)

Thomas Joseph Fisher (born 1959/1960) is a Guamanian politician. He served as a Republican member of the Guam Legislature during the 37th Legislature. In 2025, Fisher announced his candidacy for attorney general in the 2026 election. He is a graduate of the University of Kentucky College of Law.
