= Leevin Camacho =

American politician

14th Attorney General of Guam
- In office January 7, 2019 – January 2, 2023
- Governor: Lou Leon Guerrero
- Preceded by: Elizabeth Barrett-Anderson
- Succeeded by: Douglas Moylan

Personal details
- Born: 1977 or 1978 (age 46–47); Guam, U.S.
- Political party: Independent
- Spouse: Jen Crisostomo
- Children: 2
- Education: University of Washington, Seattle (BA); Boston University (JD)

Leevin Taitano Camacho is a Chamorro lawyer who served as fourteenth (fifth elected) attorney general of Guam. He was elected on November 6, 2018, defeating former attorney general Douglas Moylan with 67% of the vote. Inaugurated on January 7, 2019, Camacho succeeded Elizabeth Barrett-Anderson.

== Early life ==
Camacho was born to Lolita San Nicolas Taitano (Familian Asan and Familian Lucas) and Vincent G. Camacho (Familian Santiago and Familian Victoriano). The Camachos were a military family. He attended John F. Kennedy High School followed by the University of Washington.

== Career ==
After graduating from Boston University School of Law in 2005, Camacho returned to Guam where he clerked for the Supreme Court of Guam.

== Activism ==
Camacho is a founder of We Are Guåhan, an activist movement opposed to military buildup on Guam. He also was involved with Save Southern Guam, successfully convincing the Guam Land Use Commission to revoke construction permits for a hotel project in Pago Bay.

== Attorney General of Guam ==
=== Election ===
In a primary election on August 25, 2018, Camacho garnered the most votes (nearly 50%) despite accusations of inexperience from his opponents. He went on to win the general election against Douglas Moylan in November.

==== Primary ====
Primary election results for Attorney General of Guam, 2018
Party	Candidate	Votes	%
Nonpartisan	Leevin Camacho	14,344	46.85
Republican	Douglas Moylan	7,951	25.97
Democratic	Gary Gumataotao	7,298	23.83
—	write-ins	87	0.28
Total votes		30,619	100.00

==== General ====
General election results for Attorney General of Guam, 2018
Party	Candidate	Votes	%
Nonpartisan	Leevin Camacho	24,001	64.20
Republican	Douglas Moylan	11,427	30.56
—	write-ins	80	0.21
Total votes		37,386	100.00
Nonpartisan gain from Republican			

== Personal life ==
Camacho is married to Jennifer "Jen" Crisostomo Camacho (Familian Beyong and Familian BeckPing); they have two children, Matua and Tanom.

Camacho enjoys sports and competes in triathlons.

Legal offices
Preceded by Elizabeth Barrett-Anderson	Attorney General of Guam; 2019–2023	Succeeded by Douglas Moylan
