= 2016 Guamanian local elections =

Election in Guam

- November 8, 2016
- Mayoral elections

19 mayors
	Majority party	Minority party
Party	Democratic	Republican
Mayors	10	9
Change	▲3	▼3
Votes	16,669	13,592
Percentage	50.60%	41.26%
- Democratic hold Democratic gain Republican hold
- Vice mayoral elections

7 vice mayors
	Majority party	Minority party
Party	Republican	Democratic
Vice mayors	5	2
Change	▲1	▼1
Votes	9,420	9,232
Percentage	49.88%	48.89%
- Democratic hold Republican hold Republican gain

Mayoral elections in Guam were held on November 8, 2016, to elect mayors of nineteen villages in Guam and vice mayors in seven.

== Summary ==
=== Mayoral elections ===
Village	Incumbent	Party	First elected	Result	General election			
Agana Heights	Paul M. McDonald	Republican	1992	Incumbent re-elected.				
Agana Heights	Paul M. McDonald	Republican	1992	Incumbent re-elected.	Republican	Paul M. McDonald	914	94.91%
Agana Heights	Paul M. McDonald	Republican	1992	Incumbent re-elected.	Write-in		49	5.09%
Agana Heights	Paul M. McDonald	Republican	1992	Incumbent re-elected.	Total		963	100.00%
Asan-Maina	Joana Margaret C. Blas	Republican	2012	Incumbent lost primary. New mayor elected. Democratic gain.				
Asan-Maina	Joana Margaret C. Blas	Republican	2012	Incumbent lost primary. New mayor elected. Democratic gain.	Democratic	John A. Cruz	367	44.43%
Asan-Maina	Joana Margaret C. Blas	Republican	2012	Incumbent lost primary. New mayor elected. Democratic gain.	Republican	Vicente Limtiaco San Nicolas	293	35.47%
Asan-Maina	Joana Margaret C. Blas	Republican	2012	Incumbent lost primary. New mayor elected. Democratic gain.	Write-in	Joana Margaret C. Blas	163	19.73%
Asan-Maina	Joana Margaret C. Blas	Republican	2012	Incumbent lost primary. New mayor elected. Democratic gain.	Write-in		3	0.36%
Asan-Maina	Joana Margaret C. Blas	Republican	2012	Incumbent lost primary. New mayor elected. Democratic gain.	Total		826	100.00%
Barrigada	June U. Blas	Democratic	2012	Incumbent re-elected.				
Barrigada	June U. Blas	Democratic	2012	Incumbent re-elected.	Democratic	June U. Blas	1,988	98.32%
Barrigada	June U. Blas	Democratic	2012	Incumbent re-elected.	Write-in		34	1.68%
Barrigada	June U. Blas	Democratic	2012	Incumbent re-elected.	Total		2,022	100.00%
Chalan Pago-Ordot	Jessy C. Gogue	Democratic	2008	Incumbent re-elected.				
Chalan Pago-Ordot	Jessy C. Gogue	Democratic	2008	Incumbent re-elected.	Democratic	Jessy C. Gogue	1,083	58.04%
Chalan Pago-Ordot	Jessy C. Gogue	Democratic	2008	Incumbent re-elected.	Republican	William Joseph Brennan	779	41.75%
Chalan Pago-Ordot	Jessy C. Gogue	Democratic	2008	Incumbent re-elected.	Write-in		4	0.21%
Chalan Pago-Ordot	Jessy C. Gogue	Democratic	2008	Incumbent re-elected.	Total		1,866	100.00%
Dededo	Melissa B. Savares	Democratic	2004	Incumbent re-elected.				
Dededo	Melissa B. Savares	Democratic	2004	Incumbent re-elected.	Democratic	Melissa B. Savares	3,207	46.97%
Dededo	Melissa B. Savares	Democratic	2004	Incumbent re-elected.	Republican	Stephen Joseph Guerrero	1,813	26.55%
Dededo	Melissa B. Savares	Democratic	2004	Incumbent re-elected.	Write-in	Chuck Sanchez	1,763	25.82%
Dededo	Melissa B. Savares	Democratic	2004	Incumbent re-elected.	Write-in		45	0.66%
Dededo	Melissa B. Savares	Democratic	2004	Incumbent re-elected.	Total		6,828	100.00%
Hågat (Agat)	Carol S. Tayama	Republican	2004	Incumbent did not seek re-election. New mayor elected. Republican hold.				
Hågat (Agat)	Carol S. Tayama	Republican	2004	Incumbent did not seek re-election. New mayor elected. Republican hold.	Republican	Kevin J.T. Susuico	1,175	67.61%
Hågat (Agat)	Carol S. Tayama	Republican	2004	Incumbent did not seek re-election. New mayor elected. Republican hold.	Democratic	Roy Lawrence Gamboa	557	32.05%
Hågat (Agat)	Carol S. Tayama	Republican	2004	Incumbent did not seek re-election. New mayor elected. Republican hold.	Write-in		6	0.35%
Hågat (Agat)	Carol S. Tayama	Republican	2004	Incumbent did not seek re-election. New mayor elected. Republican hold.	Total		1,738	100.00%
Hagåtña	John A. Cruz	Republican	2004	Incumbent re-elected.				
Hagåtña	John A. Cruz	Republican	2004	Incumbent re-elected.	Republican	John A. Cruz	234	71.56%
Hagåtña	John A. Cruz	Republican	2004	Incumbent re-elected.	Write-in	Jovy Limtiaco San Agustin	83	25.38%
Hagåtña	John A. Cruz	Republican	2004	Incumbent re-elected.	Write-in		6	1.84%
Hagåtña	John A. Cruz	Republican	2004	Incumbent re-elected.	Total		327	100.00%
Humåtak (Umatac)	Johnny A. Quinata	Republican	2012	Incumbent re-elected.				
Humåtak (Umatac)	Johnny A. Quinata	Republican	2012	Incumbent re-elected.	Republican	Johnny A. Quinata	382	61.81%
Humåtak (Umatac)	Johnny A. Quinata	Republican	2012	Incumbent re-elected.	Democratic	John Q. Sanchez	235	38.03%
Humåtak (Umatac)	Johnny A. Quinata	Republican	2012	Incumbent re-elected.	Write-in		1	0.16%
Humåtak (Umatac)	Johnny A. Quinata	Republican	2012	Incumbent re-elected.	Total		618	100.00%
Inalåhan (Inarajan)	Doris F. Lujan	Democratic	2012	Incumbent re-elected.				
Inalåhan (Inarajan)	Doris F. Lujan	Democratic	2012	Incumbent re-elected.	Democratic	Doris F. Lujan	784	55.92%
Inalåhan (Inarajan)	Doris F. Lujan	Democratic	2012	Incumbent re-elected.	Republican	David P. Chargualaf Jr.	616	43.94%
Inalåhan (Inarajan)	Doris F. Lujan	Democratic	2012	Incumbent re-elected.	Write-in		2	0.14%
Inalåhan (Inarajan)	Doris F. Lujan	Democratic	2012	Incumbent re-elected.	Total		1,402	100.00%
Malesso' (Merizo)	Ernest T. Chargualaf	Republican	2008	Incumbent re-elected.				
Malesso' (Merizo)	Ernest T. Chargualaf	Republican	2008	Incumbent re-elected.	Republican	Ernest T. Chargualaf	591	55.03%
Malesso' (Merizo)	Ernest T. Chargualaf	Republican	2008	Incumbent re-elected.	Democratic	Rosie Rivera Tainatongo	482	44.88%
Malesso' (Merizo)	Ernest T. Chargualaf	Republican	2008	Incumbent re-elected.	Write-in		1	0.09%
Malesso' (Merizo)	Ernest T. Chargualaf	Republican	2008	Incumbent re-elected.	Total		1,074	100.00%
Mangilao	Nonito C. Blas	Republican	1986	Incumbent did not seek re-election. New mayor elected. Republican hold.				
Mangilao	Nonito C. Blas	Republican	1986	Incumbent did not seek re-election. New mayor elected. Republican hold.	Republican	Allan R.G. Ungacta	1,765	69.13%
Mangilao	Nonito C. Blas	Republican	1986	Incumbent did not seek re-election. New mayor elected. Republican hold.	Democratic	Roque Anderson Alcantara	778	30.47%
Mangilao	Nonito C. Blas	Republican	1986	Incumbent did not seek re-election. New mayor elected. Republican hold.	Write-in		10	0.39%
Mangilao	Nonito C. Blas	Republican	1986	Incumbent did not seek re-election. New mayor elected. Republican hold.	Total		2,553	100.00%
Mongmong-Toto-Maite	Andrew C. Villagomez	Republican	1996	Incumbent did not seek re-election. New mayor elected. Democratic gain.				
Mongmong-Toto-Maite	Andrew C. Villagomez	Republican	1996	Incumbent did not seek re-election. New mayor elected. Democratic gain.	Democratic	Rudy A. Paco	749	50.07%
Mongmong-Toto-Maite	Andrew C. Villagomez	Republican	1996	Incumbent did not seek re-election. New mayor elected. Democratic gain.	Republican	Johnny Perez Taitano	699	46.72%
Mongmong-Toto-Maite	Andrew C. Villagomez	Republican	1996	Incumbent did not seek re-election. New mayor elected. Democratic gain.	Write-in		48	3.21%
Mongmong-Toto-Maite	Andrew C. Villagomez	Republican	1996	Incumbent did not seek re-election. New mayor elected. Democratic gain.	Total		1,496	100.00%
Piti	Ben D. Gumataotao	Republican	2004	Incumbent did not seek re-election. New mayor elected. Republican hold.				
Piti	Ben D. Gumataotao	Republican	2004	Incumbent did not seek re-election. New mayor elected. Republican hold.	Republican	Jesse L.G. Alig	414	68.43%
Piti	Ben D. Gumataotao	Republican	2004	Incumbent did not seek re-election. New mayor elected. Republican hold.	Democratic	Soledad H. Chargualaf	174	28.76%
Piti	Ben D. Gumataotao	Republican	2004	Incumbent did not seek re-election. New mayor elected. Republican hold.	Write-in		17	2.81%
Piti	Ben D. Gumataotao	Republican	2004	Incumbent did not seek re-election. New mayor elected. Republican hold.	Total		605	100.00%
Sånta Rita-Sumai	Dale E. Alvarez	Democratic	2008	Incumbent re-elected.				
Sånta Rita-Sumai	Dale E. Alvarez	Democratic	2008	Incumbent re-elected.	Democratic	Dale E. Alvarez	1,078	94.81%
Sånta Rita-Sumai	Dale E. Alvarez	Democratic	2008	Incumbent re-elected.	Write-in		59	5.19%
Sånta Rita-Sumai	Dale E. Alvarez	Democratic	2008	Incumbent re-elected.	Total		1,137	100.00%
Sinajana	Robert R.D.C. Hofmann	Democratic	2012	Incumbent re-elected.				
Sinajana	Robert R.D.C. Hofmann	Democratic	2012	Incumbent re-elected.	Democratic	Robert R.D.C. Hofmann	1,097	96.91%
Sinajana	Robert R.D.C. Hofmann	Democratic	2012	Incumbent re-elected.	Write-in		35	3.09%
Sinajana	Robert R.D.C. Hofmann	Democratic	2012	Incumbent re-elected.	Total		1,132	100.00%
Talo'fo'fo	Vicente S. Taitague	Democratic	1996 (Note: Non-consecutive, serving current term since 2008)	Incumbent re-elected.				
Talo'fo'fo	Vicente S. Taitague	Democratic	1996	Incumbent re-elected.	Democratic	Vicente S. Taitague	985	94.71%
Talo'fo'fo	Vicente S. Taitague	Democratic	1996	Incumbent re-elected.	Write-in		55	5.29%
Talo'fo'fo	Vicente S. Taitague	Democratic	1996	Incumbent re-elected.	Total		1,040	100.00%
Tamuning	Louise Cruz Rivera	Republican	2012	Incumbent re-elected.				
Tamuning	Louise Cruz Rivera	Republican	2012	Incumbent re-elected.	Republican	Louise Cruz Rivera	2,007	95.94%
Tamuning	Louise Cruz Rivera	Republican	2012	Incumbent re-elected.	Write-in		85	4.06%
Tamuning	Louise Cruz Rivera	Republican	2012	Incumbent re-elected.	Total		2,092	100.00%
Yigo	Rudy M. Matanane	Republican	2012	Incumbent re-elected.				
Yigo	Rudy M. Matanane	Republican	2012	Incumbent re-elected.	Republican	Rudy M. Matanane	1,910	55.09%
Yigo	Rudy M. Matanane	Republican	2012	Incumbent re-elected.	Democratic	Peter M. Pascual	1,530	44.13%
Yigo	Rudy M. Matanane	Republican	2012	Incumbent re-elected.	Write-in		27	0..78%
Yigo	Rudy M. Matanane	Republican	2012	Incumbent re-elected.	Total		3,467	100.00%
Yona	Ken Joe Ada	Republican	2012	Incumbent did not seek re-election. Democratic gain.				
Yona	Ken Joe Ada	Republican	2012	Incumbent did not seek re-election. Democratic gain.	Democratic	Jesse M. Blas	1,575	89.74%
Yona	Ken Joe Ada	Republican	2012	Incumbent did not seek re-election. Democratic gain.	Write-in	Hiton Kiko	107	6.10%
Yona	Ken Joe Ada	Republican	2012	Incumbent did not seek re-election. Democratic gain.	Write-in		73	4.16%
Yona	Ken Joe Ada	Republican	2012	Incumbent did not seek re-election. Democratic gain.	Total		1,755	100.00%
Source...

=== Vice mayoral elections ===
Village	Incumbent	Party	First elected	Result	General election			
Barrigada	Jessie P. Bautista	Democratic	2012	Incumbent re-elected.				
Barrigada	Jessie P. Bautista	Democratic	2012	Incumbent re-elected.	Democratic	Jessie P. Bautista	1,903	98.75%
Barrigada	Jessie P. Bautista	Democratic	2012	Incumbent re-elected.	Write-in		24	1.25%
Barrigada	Jessie P. Bautista	Democratic	2012	Incumbent re-elected.	Total		1,927	100.00%
Dededo	Andrew A. Benavente	Democratic	2016	Incumbent retired. New mayor elected. Republican gain.				
Dededo	Andrew A. Benavente	Democratic	2016	Incumbent retired. New mayor elected. Republican gain.	Republican	Frank Anderson Benavente	3,296	51.03%
Dededo	Andrew A. Benavente	Democratic	2016	Incumbent retired. New mayor elected. Republican gain.	Democratic	Vincent Arriola Cabrera	3,056	47.31%
Dededo	Andrew A. Benavente	Democratic	2016	Incumbent retired. New mayor elected. Republican gain.	Write-in		107	1.66%
Dededo	Andrew A. Benavente	Democratic	2016	Incumbent retired. New mayor elected. Republican gain.	Total		6,459	100.00%
Hågat	Kevin J.T. Susuico	Republican	2015 (special)	Incumbent retired. New mayor elected. Republican hold.				
Hågat	Kevin J.T. Susuico	Republican	2015 (special)	Incumbent retired. New mayor elected. Republican hold.	Republican	Christopher J. Fejeran	1,190	70.12%
Hågat	Kevin J.T. Susuico	Republican	2015 (special)	Incumbent retired. New mayor elected. Republican hold.	Democratic	Vicente Aquiningoc Castro	497	29.29%
Hågat	Kevin J.T. Susuico	Republican	2015 (special)	Incumbent retired. New mayor elected. Republican hold.	Write-in		10	0.59%
Hågat	Kevin J.T. Susuico	Republican	2015 (special)	Incumbent retired. New mayor elected. Republican hold.	Total		1,697	100.00%
Mangilao	Allan R.G. Ungacta	Republican	2008	Incumbent retired. New mayor elected. Republican hold.				
Mangilao	Allan R.G. Ungacta	Republican	2008	Incumbent retired. New mayor elected. Republican hold.	Republican	Thomas J.F. Duenas	1,309	52.89%
Mangilao	Allan R.G. Ungacta	Republican	2008	Incumbent retired. New mayor elected. Republican hold.	Democratic	Thomas J.F. Duenas	1,153	46.59%
Mangilao	Allan R.G. Ungacta	Republican	2008	Incumbent retired. New mayor elected. Republican hold.	Write-in		13	0.53%
Mangilao	Allan R.G. Ungacta	Republican	2008	Incumbent retired. New mayor elected. Republican hold.	Total		2,475	100.00%
Sinajana	Rudy Don Iriarte	Democratic	2012	Incumbent re-elected.				
Sinajana	Rudy Don Iriarte	Democratic	2012	Incumbent re-elected.	Democratic	Rudy Don Iriarte	1,055	97.06%
Sinajana	Rudy Don Iriarte	Democratic	2012	Incumbent re-elected.	Write-in		32	2.94%
Sinajana	Rudy Don Iriarte	Democratic	2012	Incumbent re-elected.	Total		1,087	100.00%
Tamuning	Kenneth C. Santos	Republican	2012	Incumbent re-elected.				
Tamuning	Kenneth C. Santos	Republican	2012	Incumbent re-elected.	Republican	Kenneth C. Santos	1,866	98.11%
Tamuning	Kenneth C. Santos	Republican	2012	Incumbent re-elected.	Write-in		36	1.89%
Tamuning	Kenneth C. Santos	Republican	2012	Incumbent re-elected.	Total		1,902	100.00%
Yigo	Tony P. Sanchez	Republican	2012	Incumbent retired to run for governor. New mayor elected. Republican hold.				
Yigo	Tony P. Sanchez	Republican	2012	Incumbent retired to run for governor. New mayor elected. Republican hold.	Republican	Tony P. Sanchez	1,759	52.71%
Yigo	Tony P. Sanchez	Republican	2012	Incumbent retired to run for governor. New mayor elected. Republican hold.	Democratic	Katherine Blas Martir	1,568	46.99%
Yigo	Tony P. Sanchez	Republican	2012	Incumbent retired to run for governor. New mayor elected. Republican hold.	Write-in		10	0.30%
Yigo	Tony P. Sanchez	Republican	2012	Incumbent retired to run for governor. New mayor elected. Republican hold.	Total		3,337	100.00%

== See also ==
- 2016 Guamanian legislative election
- 2016 United States House of Representatives election in Guam
- 2016 United States presidential straw poll in Guam
