= Eleanor V. Valentin =

American Navy admiral

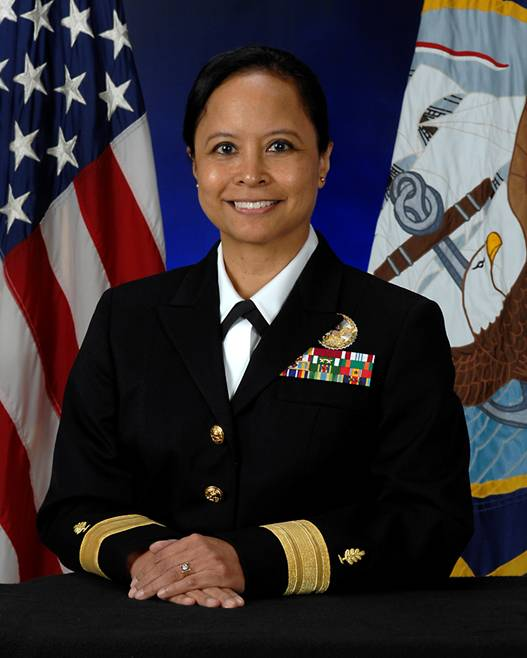
- Rear Admiral Eleanor V. Valentin
- Born: 1952 (age 73–74); Seattle, Washington
- Military career
- Allegiance: United States
- Branch: United States Navy
- Service years: 1982–2014
- Rank: Rear Admiral
- Commands: Naval Hospital/Health Clinic Cherry Point
- Awards: Defense Superior Service Medal; Legion of Merit; Defense Meritorious Service Medal

Eleanor V. Valentin is a retired United States Navy rear admiral and the first female flag officer to serve as director of the United States Navy Medical Service Corps. She assumed command of Navy Medicine Support Command and assumed duties as the 16th director of the Medical Service Corps on 1 October 2009.

== Early life and education ==
Eleanor Vivian Valentin is a native of Seattle, Washington and former college cheerleader. After receiving her Bachelor of Science degrees in Zoology and Psychology at the University of Washington, she completed a Master's degree in Public Health (Health Policy and Planning), and a Master of Science degree in Public Health (Biostatistics) at the University of Hawaiʻi.

== Naval career ==
In 1982 Valentin was commissioned as a lieutenant junior grade, Medical Service Corps, United States Navy, and for the next decade she served in a variety of department head and administrative officer positions at Naval Hospital San Diego; Admiral J. T. Boone Branch Medical Clinic in Norfolk, Virginia; Naval Medical Clinic Norfolk, Virginia; U.S. Naval Hospital Guam; Armed Forces Institute of Pathology in Washington, D.C.; and U.S. Naval Hospital Yokosuka, Japan.

Valentin served as director for Administration at Naval Medical Clinic in Pearl Harbor from 1994 to 1997. Following that duty, Valentin reported to the Bureau of Medicine and Surgery and became the branch head for TRICARE Marketing and Communications.

In October 2000, Valentin became the director, Regional Operations, in the Office of the Secretary of Defense (Health Affairs) TRICARE Management Activity. There, she led staff and joint service teams in developing plans and strategies to implement statutory and policy guidance for the delivery of healthcare services to eligible beneficiaries worldwide. From April 2003 until April 2006, she served as executive officer, Naval Hospital Corpus Christi, Texas; and from May 2006 through May 2008, she served as commanding officer, Naval Hospital/Health Clinic Cherry Point. Formerly, she served as chief of staff for Navy Medicine National Capital Area. Valentin was promoted to rear admiral on September 1, 2009. On October 1, 2009, Valentin assumed duties as chief, Medical Service Corps. With her promotion to flag rank, Valentin became the first female director of the Medical Service Corps to reach that milestone. Valentin retired in 2014.

== See also ==
- Women in the United States Navy
