= 2016 United States House of Representatives election in Guam =

United States House of Representatives of Guam
- November 8, 2016
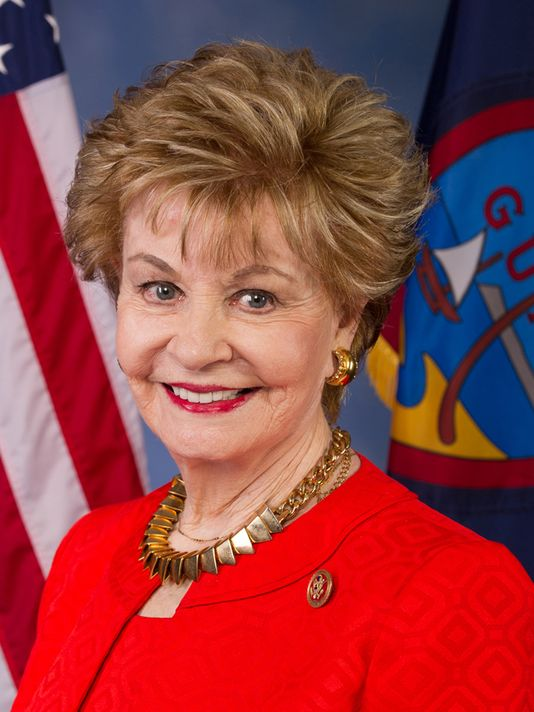

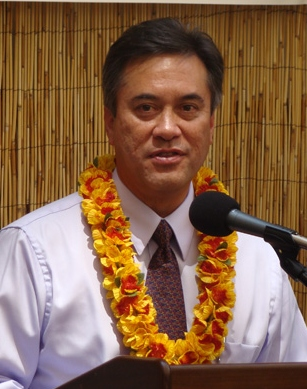
Nominee	Madeleine Bordallo	Felix Perez Camacho
Party	Democratic	Republican
Popular vote	18,345	15,617
Percentage	53.7%	45.7%
- Results by village Madeleine Bordallo: 50–55% 55–60% Felix Perez Camacho: 50–55% 55–60%
Delegate before election
Madeleine Bordallo
Democratic
Elected Delegate
Madeleine Bordallo
Democratic

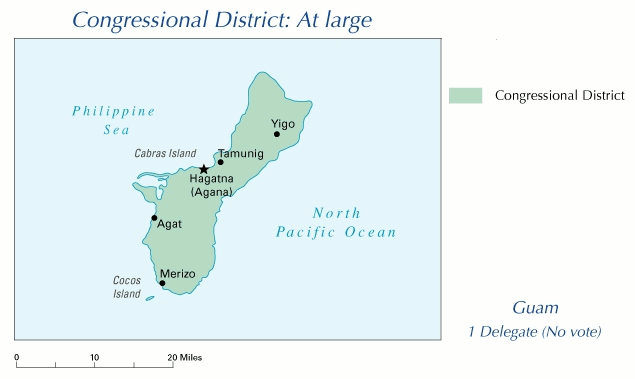
Guam's at-large congressional district

The 2016 United States House of Representatives election in Guam was held on Tuesday, November 8, 2016, to elect the non-voting Delegate to the United States House of Representatives from Guam's at-large congressional district. The election coincided with the elections of other federal and state offices, including the larger 2016 Guamanian general election, the 2016 United States House of Representatives elections, and the 2016 United States general elections.

The non-voting delegate is elected for a two-year term. Incumbent Democratic Delegate Madeleine Bordallo, who has represented the district since 2003, is seeking re-election for an 8th term. She announced her re-election campaign on January 24, 2016, at the Plaza de Espana in Hagåtña. She is being challenged by Republican Felix Perez Camacho, who served as the Governor of Guam from 2003 to 2011. The primary elections were held on Saturday, August 27, 2016.

== Democratic primary ==
=== Candidates ===
==== Declared ====
- Anthony "Tony" Babauta, former Assistant Secretary of the Office of Insular Affairs
- Madeleine Bordallo, incumbent Delegate

=== Results ===
Democratic primary results
Party	Candidate	Votes	%
Democratic	Madeleine Bordallo (incumbent)	8,061	62.8
Democratic	Tony Babauta	4,715	36.7
Democratic	Write-ins	58	0.5
Total votes		12,834	100.0

== Republican primary ==
=== Candidates ===
==== Declared ====
- Felix Perez Camacho, former Governor of Guam
- Margaret Metcalfe, Republican National Committeewoman and nominee for Delegate in 2014

=== Results ===
Republican primary results
Party	Candidate	Votes	%
Republican	Felix Perez Camacho	4,651	60.2
Republican	Margaret Metcalfe	3,042	39.4
Republican	Write-ins	34	0.4
Total votes		7,727	100.0

== General election ==
=== Polling ===
An election poll conducted by the University of Guam in September 2016 showed incumbent Delegate Madeleine Bordallo leading with 56%, while Republican Felix Camacho placed second with 44%.

=== Results ===
The general election was held on November 8, 2016.

2016 Guam Delegate general election results
Party	Candidate	Votes	%	±%
Democratic	Madeleine Bordallo (incumbent)	18,345	53.69%	−4.17%
Republican	Felix Perez Camacho	15,617	45.71%	+3.83%
n/a	Write-ins	206	0.60%	+0.28%
Total votes		'34,168'	'100.0%'	N/A
Democratic hold				
