= 2014 United States House of Representatives election in Guam =

United States House of Representatives of Guam
- November 4, 2014
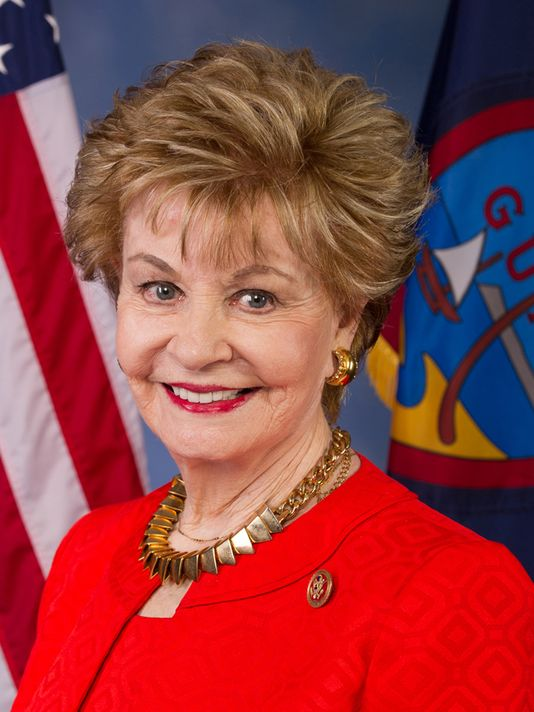

Nominee	Madeleine Bordallo	Margaret Metcalfe
Party	Democratic	Republican
Popular vote	20,693	14,956
Percentage	57.9%	41.8%
- Results by village: Madeleine Bordallo: 50–55% 55–60% 60–65%
Delegate before election
Madeleine Bordallo
Democratic
Elected Delegate
Madeleine Bordallo
Democratic

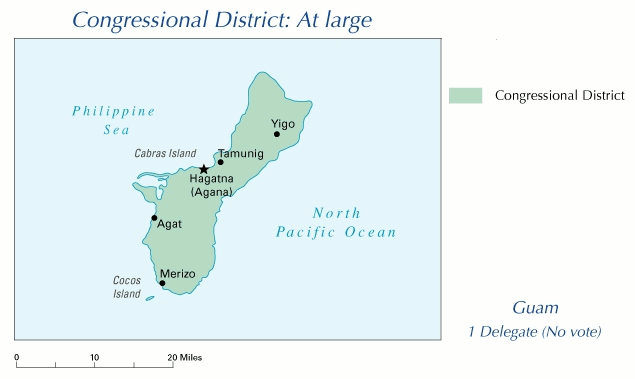
Guam's at-large congressional district

The 2014 United States House of Representatives election in Guam will be held on Tuesday, November 4, 2014, to elect the non-voting Delegate to the United States House of Representatives from Guam's at-large congressional district. The election will coincide with the elections of other federal and state offices, including the 2014 Guamanian gubernatorial election.

The non-voting delegate is elected for a two-year term. Incumbent Democratic Delegate Madeleine Bordallo, who has represented the district since 2003, was re-elected. She filed for re-election on June 29, 2014.

== Candidates ==
=== Democratic ===
- Madeleine Bordallo, incumbent Delegate
- Matthew Pascual Artero, current realtor from Artero Realty.

=== Republican ===
- Margaret Metcalfe, Republican National committeewoman.

==== Withdrew ====
- Former senator Frank Blas Jr., Guam Senate Minority Leader and son of former lieutenant governor Frank Blas.
- Former governor Felix P. Camacho

== Results ==
=== Democratic primary results ===
Democratic Party of Guam primary result
Party	Candidate	Votes	%
Democratic	Madeleine Bordallo (incumbent)	5,898	74.5
Democratic	Matthew P. Artero	2,016	25.5
Total votes		7,914	100.0

Congresswoman Bordallo's Democratic challenger, Karlo Dizon, endorsed her for re-election following the primary.

=== Republican primary results ===
Republican Party of Guam primary results
Party	Candidate	Votes	%
Republican	Margaret Metcalfe	6,753	100.0
Total votes		6,753	100.0

=== General election ===
Guam's at-large congressional district election results
Party	Candidate	Votes	%	±%
Democratic	Madeleine Bordallo (incumbent)	20,693	57.86%	−2.64%
Republican	Margaret Metcalfe	14,956	41.82%	+2.32%
n/a	Write-ins	113	0.32%	N/A
Total votes		35,762	'100.0%'	N/A
Democratic hold				

== See also ==
- 2012 United States House of Representatives election in Guam
