= 2012 United States House of Representatives election in Guam =

United States House of Representatives of Guam
- November 6, 2012
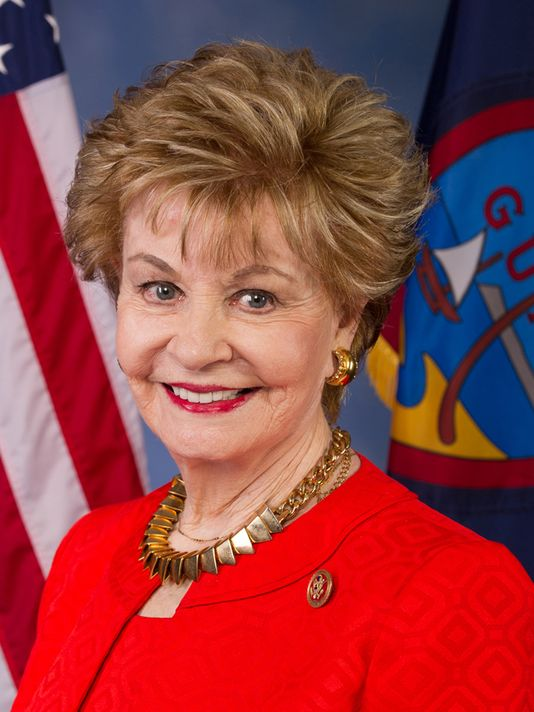

Nominee	Madeleine Bordallo	Frank F. Blas Jr.
Party	Democratic	Republican
Popular vote	19,475	12,995
Percentage	58.00%	38.14%
Delegate before election
Madeleine Bordallo
Democratic
Elected Delegate
Madeleine Bordallo
Democratic

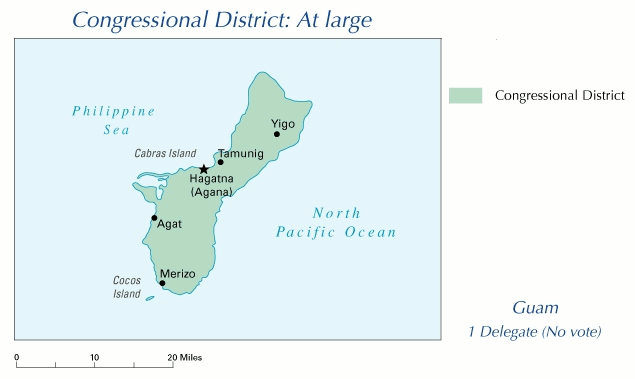
Guam's at-large congressional district

The 2012 United States House of Representatives election in Guam was held on Tuesday, November 6, 2012, to elect the non-voting Delegate to the United States House of Representatives from Guam. The election coincided with the elections of other federal offices, including a quadrennial presidential election.

The non-voting delegate is elected for two-year terms. Democratic incumbent Madeleine Bordallo, who has represented the district since 2003, won re-election for a sixth consecutive two-year term.

== Candidates ==
=== Democratic candidates ===
- Madeleine Bordallo, incumbent Delegate
- Karlo Dizon, former energy non-governmental organization official and campaign staffer
- Patrick Iriarte (running as a write-in)

==== Declined ====
- Carl T.C. Gutierrez, former Governor

=== Republican candidates ===
- Frank F. Blas Jr., Guam Senate Minority Leader and son of former Lieutenant Governor Frank Blas

=== Independent ===
- Jonathan Diaz (I), former teacher at the University of Guam

== Primary election results ==
=== Democratic Party ===
Democratic Party of Guam for Guam Delegate
Party	Candidate	Votes	%
Democratic	Madeleine Bordallo	7,853	73.07
Democratic	Karlo Dizon	2,824	26.28
Total votes		10,677	100

Congresswoman Bordallo's Democratic challenger, Karlo Dizon, endorsed her for re-election following the primary.

=== Republican Party ===
Republican Party of Guam for Guam Delegate
Party	Candidate	Votes	%
Republican	Frank F. Blas Jr.	5,301	98.33
Total votes		5,301	98.33

=== Independent ===
Non-Partisan for Guam Delegate
Party	Candidate	Votes	%
Independent	Jonathan Blas Diaz	86	96.63
Total votes		86	96.63

== General election results ==
Election results, Guam Delegate to the United States House of Representatives, November 6, 2012
Party	Candidate	Votes	%
Democratic	Madeleine Bordallo	20,174	60.5
Republican	Frank F. Blas Jr.	13,160	39.5
Total votes		33,334	100
Democratic hold			

== See also ==
- United States House of Representatives election in Guam, 2010
