= Guam's at-large congressional district =

At-large U.S. House district for Guam

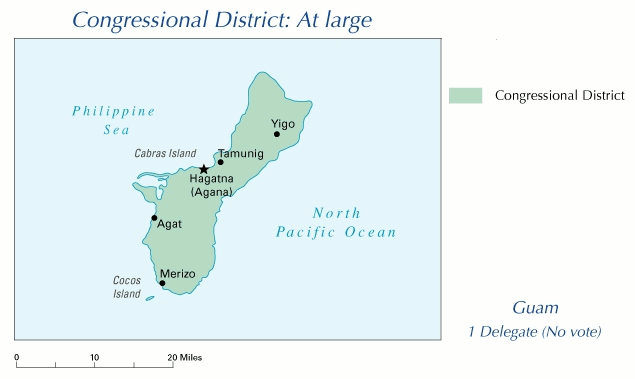
- Delegate: James Moylan; R–Tumon
- Area: 210 mi^{2} (540 km^{2})
- Population (2020): 153,836
- Median household income: 34,598
- Ethnicity: 56.4% other; 28.6% Asian; 6.9% White; 2.2% Hispanic; 0.1% Black; 0.0% Native American

Guam's at-large congressional district comprises the entire area of the United States territory of Guam. Guam has been represented in the United States House of Representatives by a non-voting delegate since 1972. Its first delegate, Antonio Borja Won Pat, had been serving as the Washington Representative lobbying for a delegate since 1965, elected for four-year terms in 1964 and 1968. It is currently represented by Republican James Moylan who has represented the district since 2023.

== List of delegates representing the district ==
Representative	Party	Term	Cong ress	Electoral history
District established February 12, 1970
Vacant		February 12, 1970 – January 3, 1973	91st 92nd	
Antonio B. Won Pat (Sinajana)	Democratic	January 3, 1973 – January 3, 1985	93rd 94th 95th 96th 97th 98th	Elected in 1972. Re-elected in 1974. Re-elected in 1976. Re-elected in 1978. Re-elected in 1980. Re-elected in 1982. Lost re-election.
Vicente T. Blaz (Ordot)	Republican	January 3, 1985 – January 3, 1993	99th 100th 101st 102nd	Elected in 1984. Re-elected in 1986. Re-elected in 1988. Re-elected in 1990. Lost re-election.
Robert A. Underwood (Yona)	Democratic	January 3, 1993 – January 3, 2003	103rd 104th 105th 106th 107th	Elected in 1992. Re-elected in 1994. Re-elected in 1996. Re-elected in 1998. Re-elected in 2000. Retired to run for Governor.
Madeleine Z. Bordallo (Hagåtña)	Democratic	January 3, 2003 – January 3, 2019	108th 109th 110th 111th 112th 113th 114th 115th	Elected in 2002. Re-elected in 2004. Re-elected in 2006. Re-elected in 2008. Re-elected in 2010. Re-elected in 2012. Re-elected in 2014. Re-elected in 2016. Lost renomination.
Michael San Nicolas (Dededo)	Democratic	January 3, 2019 – January 3, 2023	116th 117th	Elected in 2018. Re-elected in 2020. Retired to run for Governor.
James Moylan (Tumon)	Republican	January 3, 2023 – present	118th 119th	Elected in 2022. Re-elected in 2024. Lost re-election.
Alicia Limtiaco	Democratic	Assuming office on January 3, 2027		Elected in 2026.

== Recent election results ==
=== 1972 ===
Guam Delegate to the United States House of Representatives election, November 7, 1972
Party	Candidate	Votes	%
Democratic	Antonio Borja Won Pat	12,651	58.8%
Republican	Pedro Perez	8,847	41.1%
Write-in		15	0.1%
Total votes		21,513	100.00%
Democratic win			

=== 1974 ===
Guam Delegate to the United States House of Representatives election, November 4, 1974
Party	Candidate	Votes	%
Democratic	Antonio Borja Won Pat (Incumbent)	18,551	100.00%
Total votes		18,551	100.00%
Democratic hold			

=== 1976 ===
Guam Delegate to the United States House of Representatives election, November 2, 1976
Party	Candidate	Votes	%
Democratic	Antonio Borja Won Pat (Incumbent)	19,038	90.2%
Write-in		2,077	9.8%
Total votes		21,115	100.00%
Democratic hold			

=== 1978 ===
Guam Delegate to the United States House of Representatives election, November 7, 1978
Party	Candidate	Votes	%
Democratic	Antonio Borja Won Pat (Incumbent)	21,123	91.0%
Write-in		2,088	9.0%
Total votes		23,211	100.00%
Democratic hold			

=== 1980 ===
Guam Delegate to the United States House of Representatives election, November 4, 1980
Party	Candidate	Votes	%
Democratic	Antonio Borja Won Pat (Incumbent)	14,834	58.3%
Republican	Antonio M. Palomo	10,622	41.7%
Total votes		25,456	100.00%
Democratic hold			

=== 1982 ===
Guam Delegate to the United States House of Representatives election, November 2, 1982
Party	Candidate	Votes	%
Democratic	Antonio Borja Won Pat (Incumbent)	15,627	51.7%
Republican	Vincente Thomas "Ben" Blaz	14,579	48.3%
Total votes		30,206	100.00%
Democratic hold			

=== 1984 ===
Guam Delegate to the United States House of Representatives election, November 6, 1984
Party	Candidate	Votes	%
Republican	Ben Garrido Blaz	15,839	50.3%
Democratic	Antonio Borja Won Pat (Incumbent)	15,485	49.2%
Write-in		144	0.5%
Total votes		31,468	100.00%
Republican gain from Democratic			

=== 1986 ===
Guam Delegate to the United States House of Representatives election, November 4, 1986
Party	Candidate	Votes	%
Republican	Ben Garrido Blaz (Incumbent)	22,207	64.6%
Democratic	Frank C. Torres Jr.	12,147	35.4%
Total votes		34,354	100.00%
Republican hold			

=== 1988 ===
Guam Delegate to the United States House of Representatives election, November 8, 1988
Party	Candidate	Votes	%
Republican	Ben Garrido Blaz (Incumbent)	16,185	54.7%
Democratic	Vincent C. Pangelinan	13,426	45.3%
Total votes		29,611	100.00%
Republican hold			

=== 1990 ===
Guam Delegate to the United States House of Representatives election, November 6, 1990
Party	Candidate	Votes	%
Republican	Ben Garrido Blaz (Incumbent)	21,390	55.1%
Democratic	Vincent C. Pangelinan	16,437	42.4%
Write-in		976	2.5%
Total votes		38,803	100.00%
Republican hold			

=== 1992 ===
Guam Delegate to the United States House of Representatives election, November 3, 1992
Party	Candidate	Votes	%
Democratic	Robert A. Underwood	18,462	55.3%
Republican	Ben Garrido Blaz (Incumbent)	14,921	44.7%
Total votes		33,383	100.00%
Democratic gain from Republican			

=== 1994 ===
Guam Delegate to the United States House of Representatives election, November 8, 1994
Party	Candidate	Votes	%
Democratic	Robert A. Underwood (Incumbent)	36,379	100.00%
Total votes		36,379	100.00%
Democratic hold			

=== 1996 ===
Guam Delegate to the United States House of Representatives election, November 5, 1996
Party	Candidate	Votes	%
Democratic	Robert A. Underwood (Incumbent)	34,395	100.00%
Total votes		34,395	100.00%
Democratic hold			

=== 1998 ===
Guam Delegate to the United States House of Representatives election, November 3, 1998
Party	Candidate	Votes	%
Democratic	Robert A. Underwood (Incumbent)	34,179	76.1%
Republican	Manuel Q. Cruz	10,763	23.9%
Total votes		44,942	100.00%
Democratic hold			

=== 2000 ===
Guam Delegate to the United States House of Representatives election, November 7, 2000
Party	Candidate	Votes	%
Democratic	Robert A. Underwood (Incumbent)	29,099	78.1%
Republican	Manuel Cruz	8,167	21.9%
Total votes		37,266	100.00%
Democratic hold			

=== 2002 ===
Guam Delegate to the United States House of Representatives election, November 5, 2002
Party	Candidate	Votes	%
Democratic	Madeleine Bordallo	27,081	63.6%
Republican	Joseph F. Ada	14,836	34.9%
Write-in		662	1.5%
Total votes		42,579	100.00%
Democratic hold			

=== 2004 ===
Guam Delegate to the United States House of Representatives election, November 2, 2004
Party	Candidate	Votes	%
Democratic	Madeleine Bordallo (Incumbent)	31,051	97.4%
Write-in		837	2.6%
Total votes		31,888	100.00%
Democratic hold			

=== 2006 ===
Guam Delegate to the United States House of Representatives election, November 7, 2006
Party	Candidate	Votes	%
Democratic	Madeleine Bordallo (Incumbent)	32,677	96.5%
Write-in		1,201	3.5%
Total votes		33,878	100.00%
Democratic hold			

=== 2008 ===
Guam Delegate to the United States House of Representatives election, November 4, 2008
Party	Candidate	Votes	%
Democratic	Madeleine Bordallo (Incumbent)	28,247	94.6%
Write-in		1,617	5.4%
Total votes		29,864	100.00%
Democratic hold			

=== 2010 ===
Guam Delegate to the United States House of Representatives election, November 2, 2010
Party	Candidate	Votes	%
Democratic	Madeleine Bordallo (Incumbent)	35,919	95.9%
Republican	Write-in	796	2.1%
Democratic	Write-in	706	1.9%
Total votes		37,421	100.00%
Democratic hold			

=== 2012 ===
2012 Guam's at-large congressional district
Party	Candidate	Votes	%
Democratic	Madeleine Bordallo (incumbent)	20,174	60.5
Republican	Frank F. Blas Jr.	13,160	39.5
Total votes		33,334	100
Democratic hold			

=== 2014 ===
2014 Guam's at-large congressional district
Party	Candidate	Votes	%	±%
Democratic	Madeleine Bordallo (incumbent)	20,693	57.86%	−2.64%
Republican	Margaret Metcalfe	14,956	41.82%	+2.32%
n/a	Write-ins	113	0.32%	N/A
Total votes		35,762	'100.0%'	N/A
Democratic hold				

=== 2016 ===
2016 Guam's at-large congressional district
Party	Candidate	Votes	%	±%
Democratic	Madeleine Bordallo (incumbent)	18,345	53.69%	−4.17%
Republican	Felix Perez Camacho	15,617	45.71%	+3.83%
Write-in		206	0.60%	
Total votes		34,168	100.0%	N/A
Democratic hold				

=== 2018 ===
2018 Guam's at-large congressional district
Party	Candidate	Votes	%	±%
Democratic	Michael San Nicolas	19,193	54.85%	+1.16%
Republican	Doris Flores-Brooks	15,398	44.01%	−1.70%
Write-in		399	1.14%	+0.54%
Total votes		34,990	100.00%	N/A
Democratic hold				

=== 2020 ===
2020 Guam Delegate general election results
Party	Candidate	Votes	%
Democratic	Michael San Nicolas (incumbent)	13,000	45.95
Democratic	Robert A. Underwood	9,300	32.87
Republican	Wil Castro	5,942	21.00
Write-in		51	0.18
Total votes		28,293	100.00

2020 Guam Delegate election runoff results
Party	Candidate	Votes	%
Democratic	Michael San Nicolas (incumbent)	10,467	59.62
Democratic	Robert A. Underwood	7,090	40.38
—	Overvotes	5	.03
—	Undervotes	28	.16
Total votes		17,355	100.00

=== 2022 ===
2022 United States House of Representatives election in Guam
Party	Candidate	Votes	%	±%
Republican	James Moylan	17,075	52.19%	+31.19%
Democratic	Judith Won Pat	15,427	47.15%	−31.67%
Write-in		217	0.66%	+0.48%
Total votes		32,719	100.0%	
Republican gain from Democratic				

=== 2024 ===
2024 United States House of Representatives election in Guam
Party	Candidate	Votes	%	±%
Republican	James Moylan (incumbent)	15,422	52.69%	+0.57%
Democratic	Ginger Cruz	13,703	46.81%	−0.41%
Write-in		146	0.50%	-0.16%
Total votes		29,271	100.00%	
Republican hold				
