= Guam High School (Guam) =

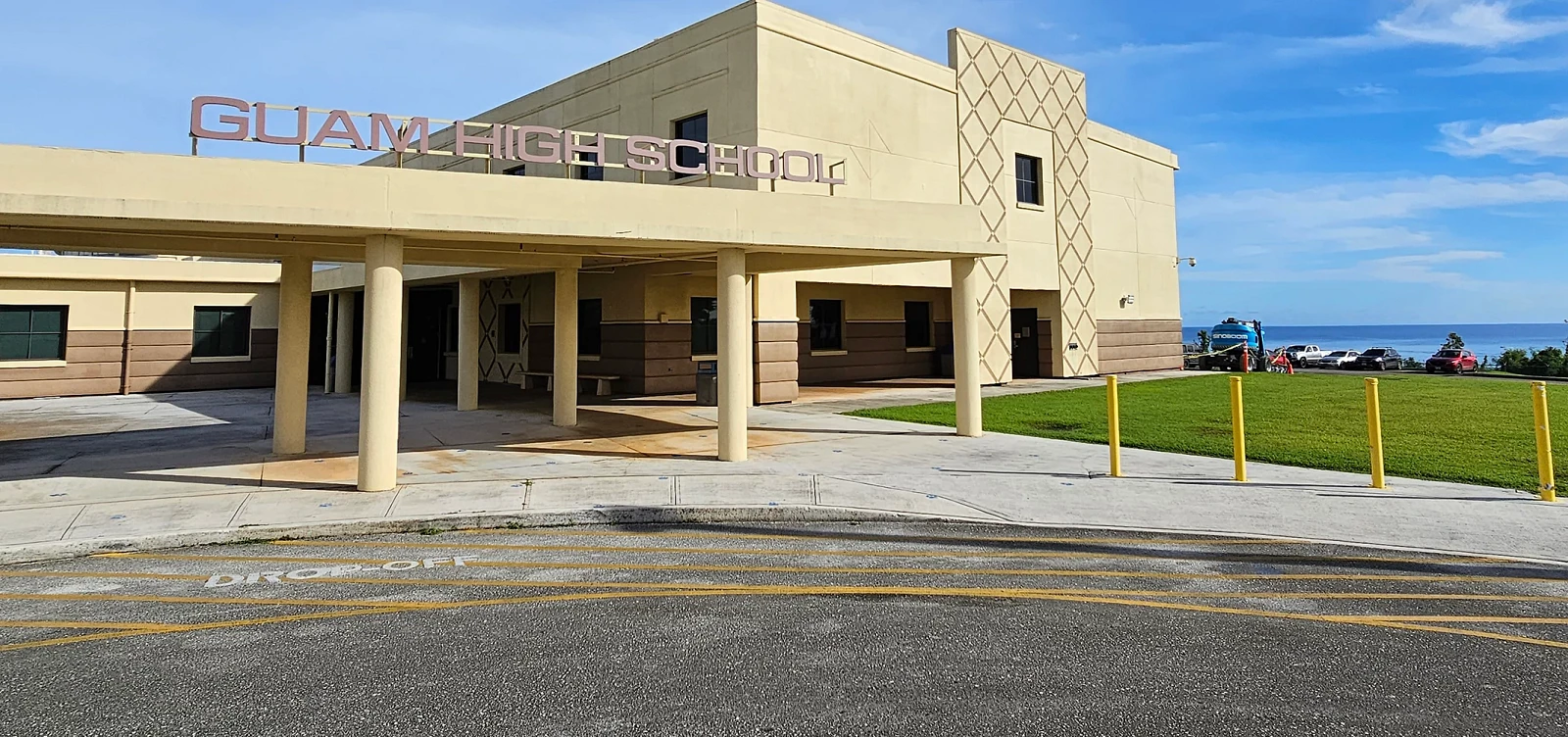

Location
- 401 Stitt Street, Agana Heights, GU; Agana Heights, Guam; United States; 13°28′27″N 144°44′40″E

Information
- Type: High school
- Motto: Guiding students for life-long learning High expectations and total accountability Striving for success
- CEEB code: 525101
- Principal: Katrina Watts
- Assistant Principal: Vacant
- Grades: 9–12
- Enrollment: 481
- Student to teacher ratio: 15:1
- Colors: Blue and gold
- Mascot: Panthers
- Website: www.dodea.edu/guamhs/index.cfm

Guam High School (GHS or GMHS) is a U.S. military operated secondary school located at 401 Stitt Street in Agana Heights in the United States territory of Guam.

The school, a part of the Department of War Education Activity (formerly known as Department of Defense Education Activity), serves over 400 students grades 9 through 12. The school serves children of military personnel and other eligible federal employees stationed in Guam. Staff includes forty-six teachers, six full-time staffs, and two administrators. The principal is Katrina Watts.

In September 1997 the DoWEA opened its own schools for children of military personnel. It is within the Naval Hospital census-designated place, defined by the U.S. Census Bureau.

== School Uniforms ==
Unlike other Department of War Education Activity schools on Guam, Guam High School does not implement a school uniform policy for everyday classes. The only exception to this is while participating in physical education courses, during which students are required to wear a basic uniform consisting of either a gray tee shirt and black athletic shorts or a Physical Training (PT) uniform issued to students participating in the school's Navy Junior Reserve Officers' Training Corps (NJROTC) program. Certain extracurricular activities may also require their own uniform during their events.

== Athletics ==
Athletic activities at the school include:

- Baseball
- Basketball
- Cheerleading
- Cross country
- American football
- Soccer (football)
- Golf
- Paddling
- Rugby
- Softball
- Track and Field
- Volleyball
- Wrestling

== Other organizations and programs ==
Other organizations and programs include:

- Navy Junior Reserve Officer Training Corps (NJROTC)
- A team of sharpshooters to compete in a Marksmanship competition with other schools
- A theatre program
- A school wide morning broadcast under the name of Panther News Network (PNN)
- Student Government & Class Councils
- A "Gaming Club" where students play card games, board games, Dungeons and Dragons, and more
- A Red Cross Club for supporting the efforts of the local Red Cross
- A Robotics club where students engineer, build, and program robots to compete in the FIRST Tech Challenge
- "Anchored 4 Life", a new program for promoting development of leadership skills in students
- An Ambassador Club to help new students adjust to life at Guam High
- A Yearbook club
- A newspaper/magazine cub to produce the school's paper entitled "Panther Planet"
- National Technical Honor Society (NTHS)
- National Art Honor Society (NAHS)
- Student Government Association (SGA)
- A Mock Trial team
- Drama Club
- A music department consisting of a concert band, chorus, jazz band, ukulele ensemble, piano ensemble, and guitar ensemble
- An Esports team that competes in competitions for Valorant and Rocket League
