= Navy Medical Service Corps =

Medical-focused staff corps of the United States Navy

United States Navy Medical Service Corps
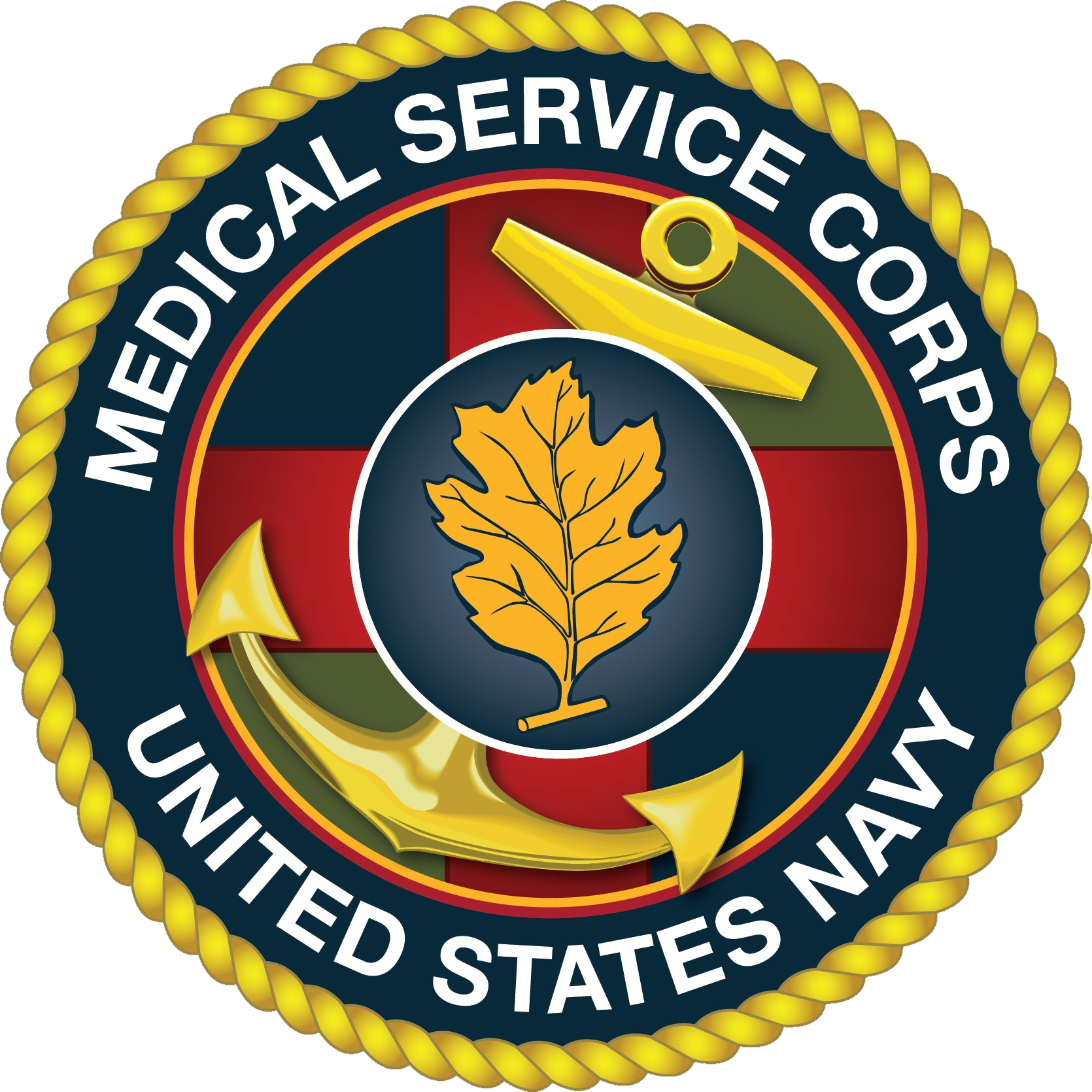
- Seal of the United States Navy Medical Service Corps
- Founded: August 4, 1947; 79 years ago
- Country: United States of America
- Branch: United States Navy
- Role: Military medical support and research
- Size: 2,600 officers (approximately)
- Website: Homepage

The United States Navy Medical Service Corps is a staff corps of the U.S. Navy, consisting of officers engaged in medical support duties. It includes healthcare scientists and researchers, comprising around 60% of its personnel, and healthcare administrators, comprising the remaining 40%. Many of the latter are former enlisted hospital corpsmen, the Medical Service Corps Inservice Procurement Program (MSC-IPP) being one of several routes from enlisted service to commissioned status. The Medical Service Corps has around 2,600 serving commissioned officers.

== Prior Chiefs / Directors ==
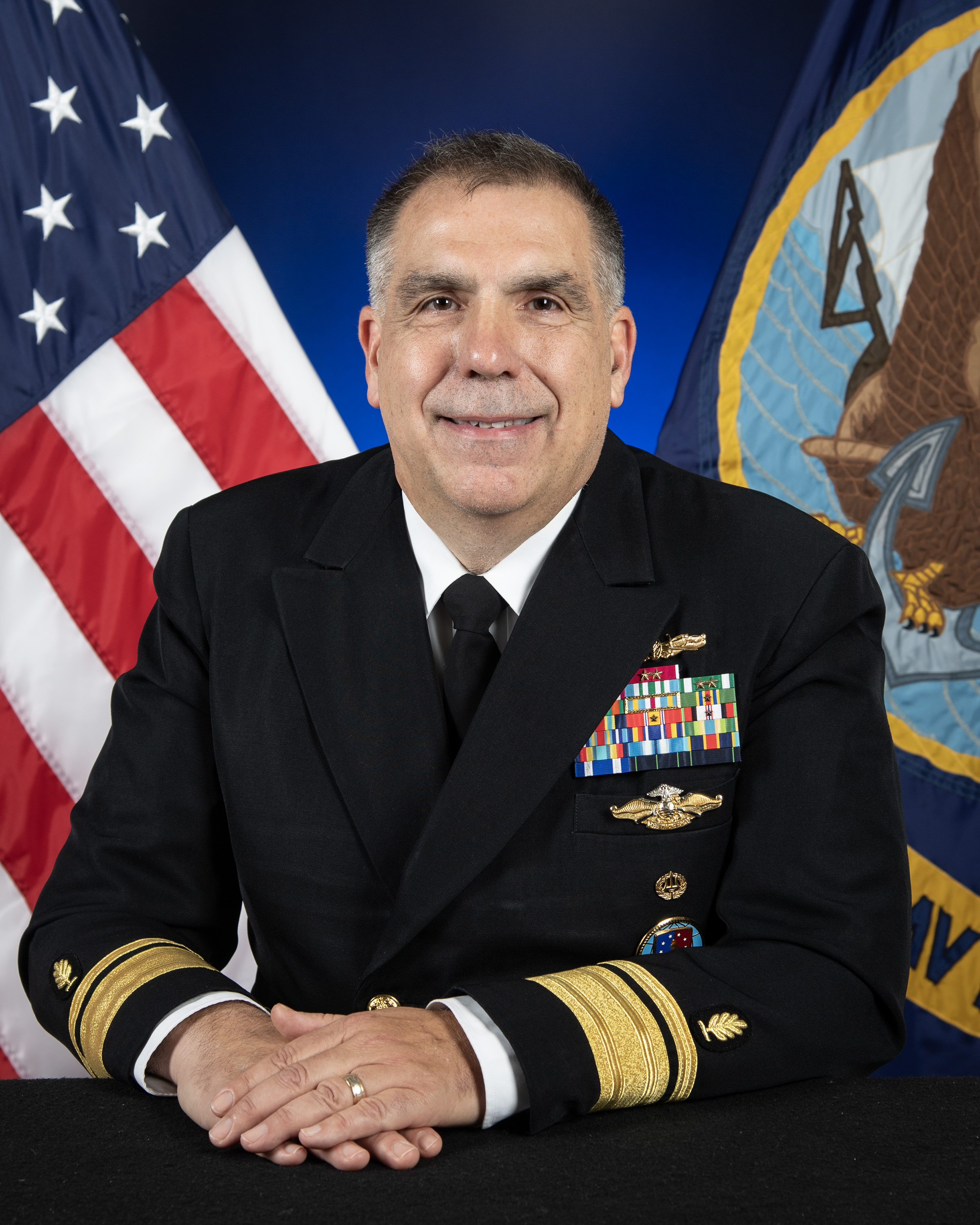
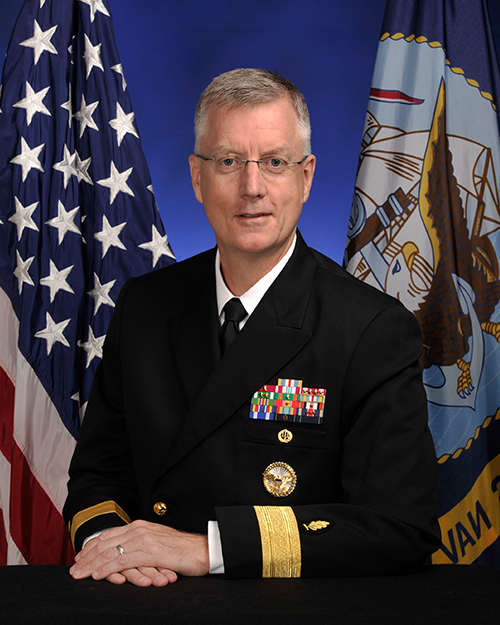
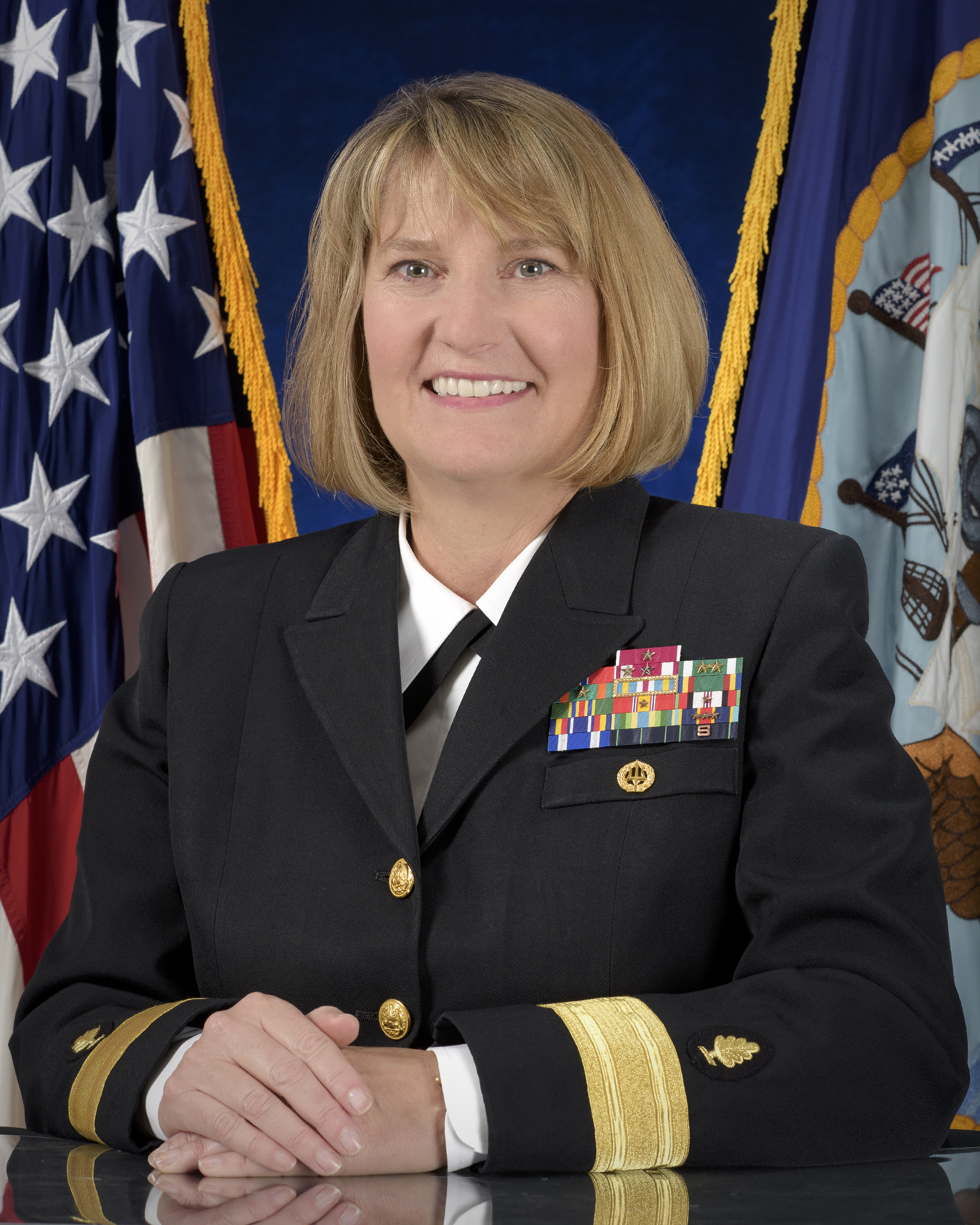
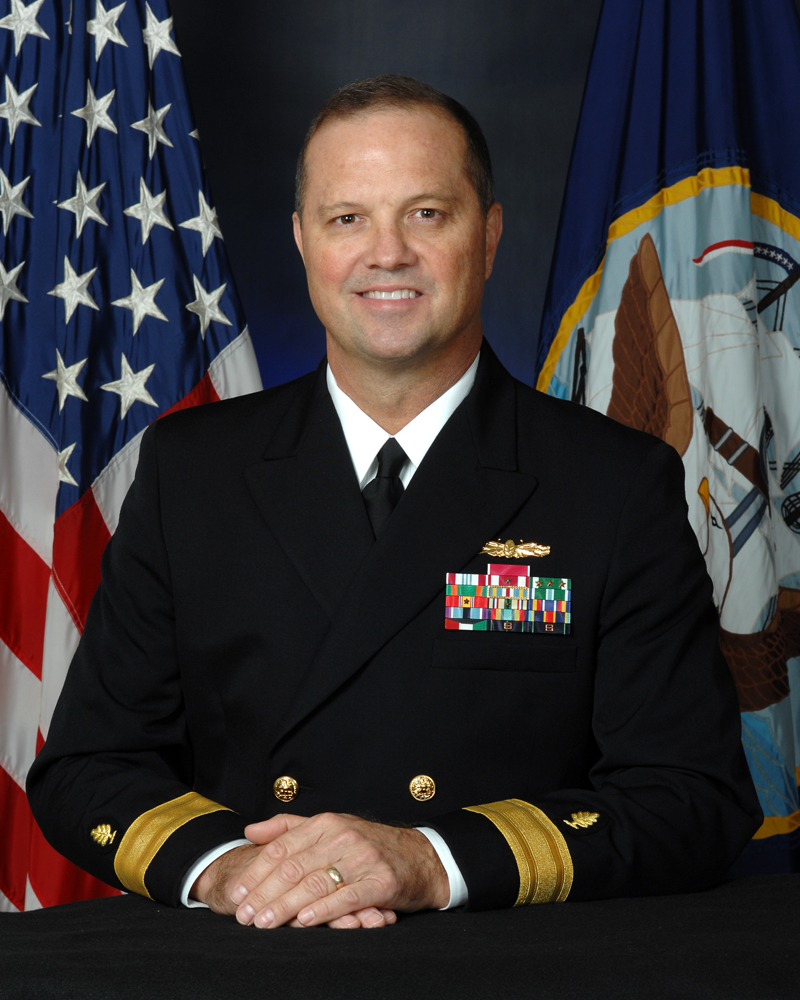
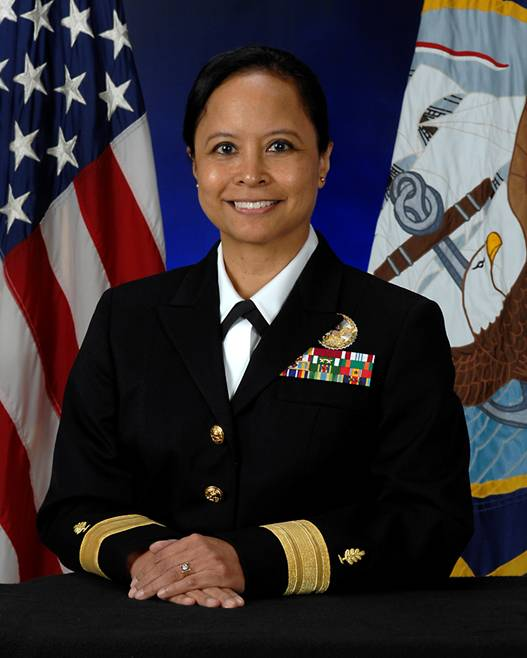
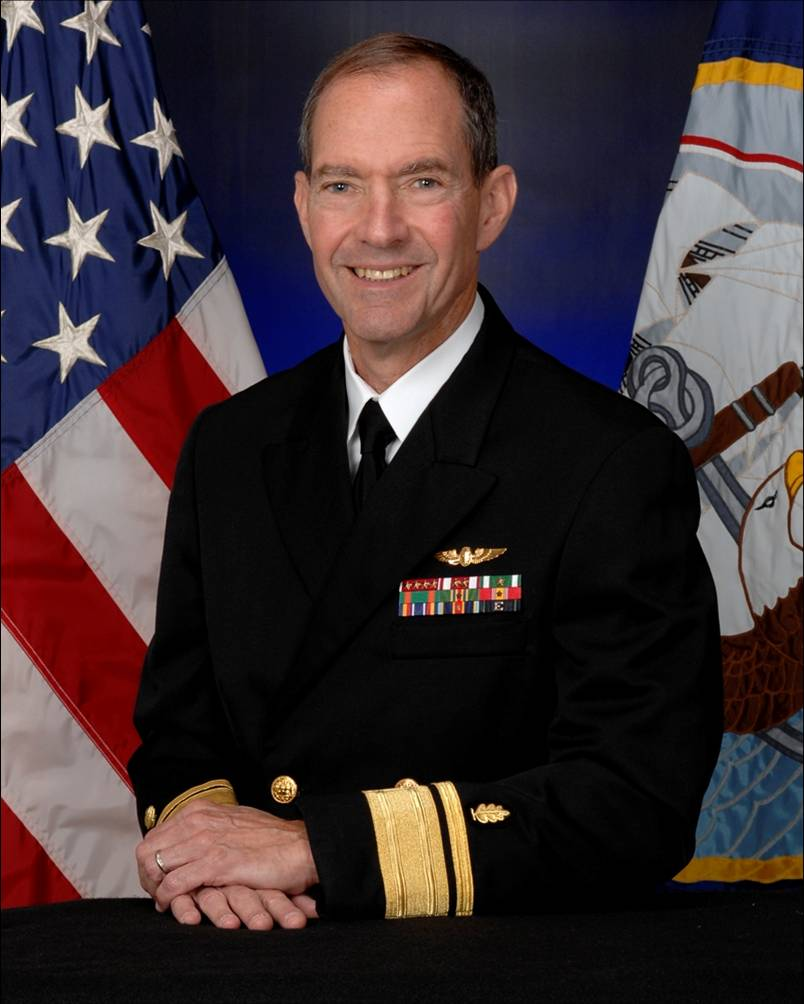
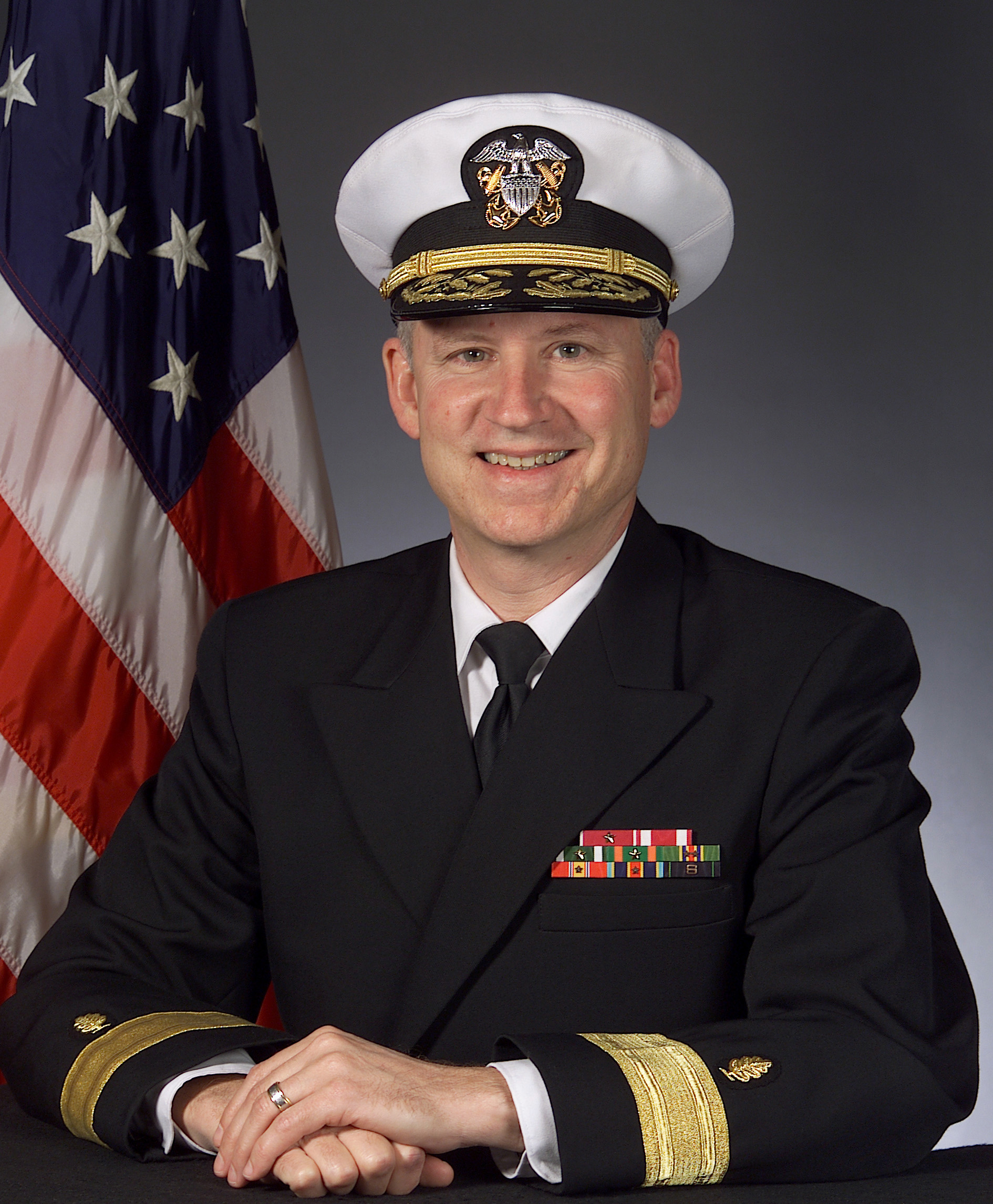
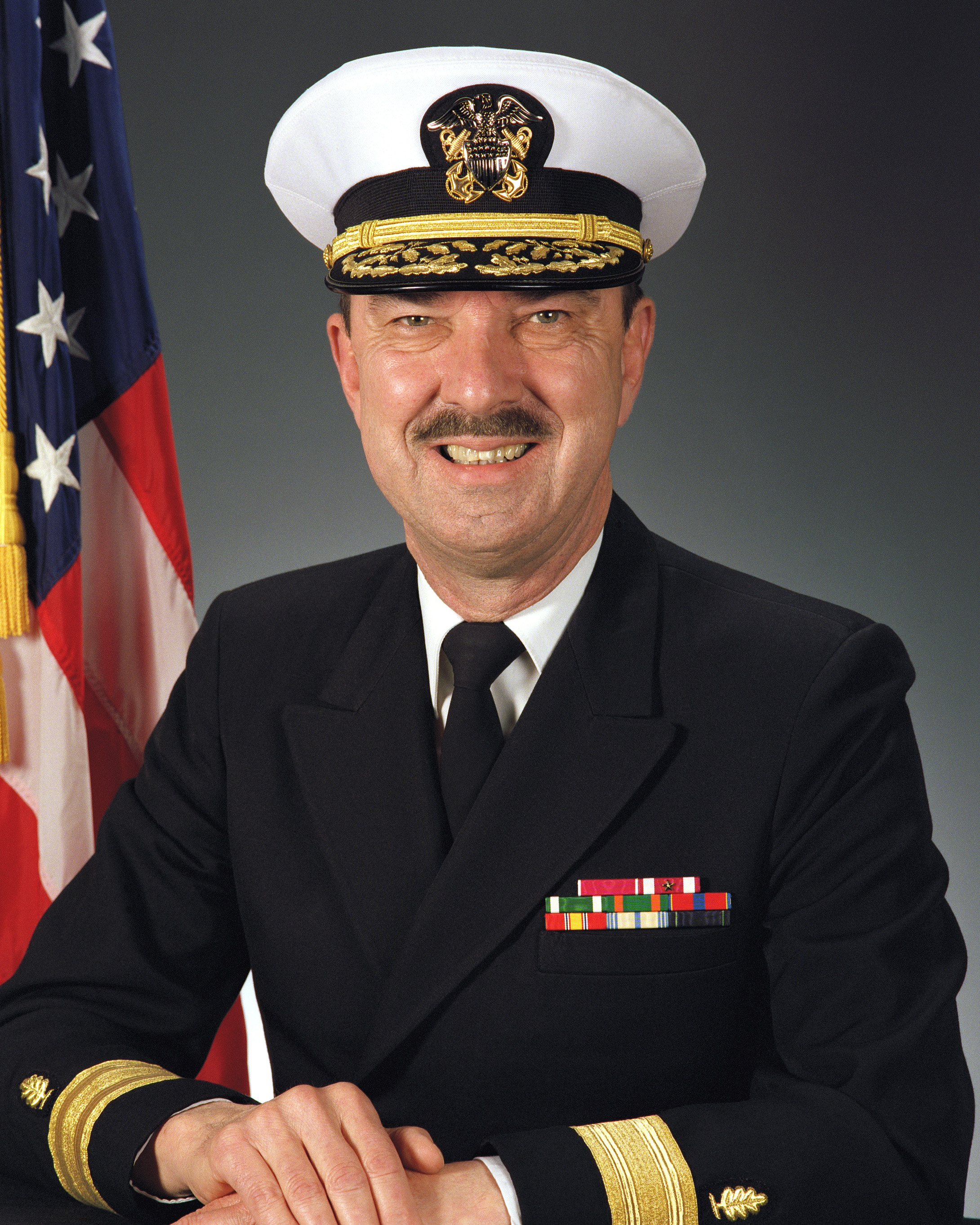
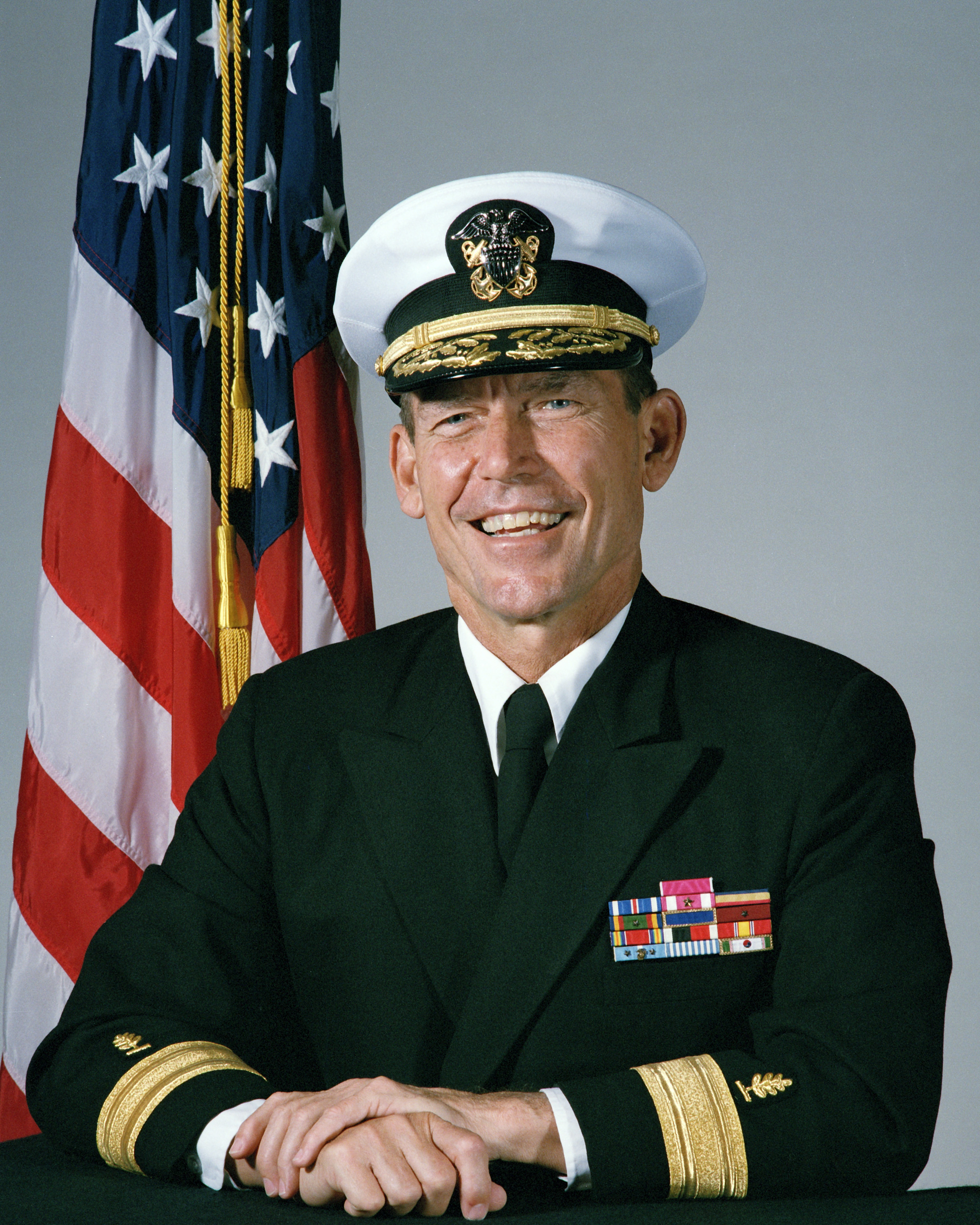
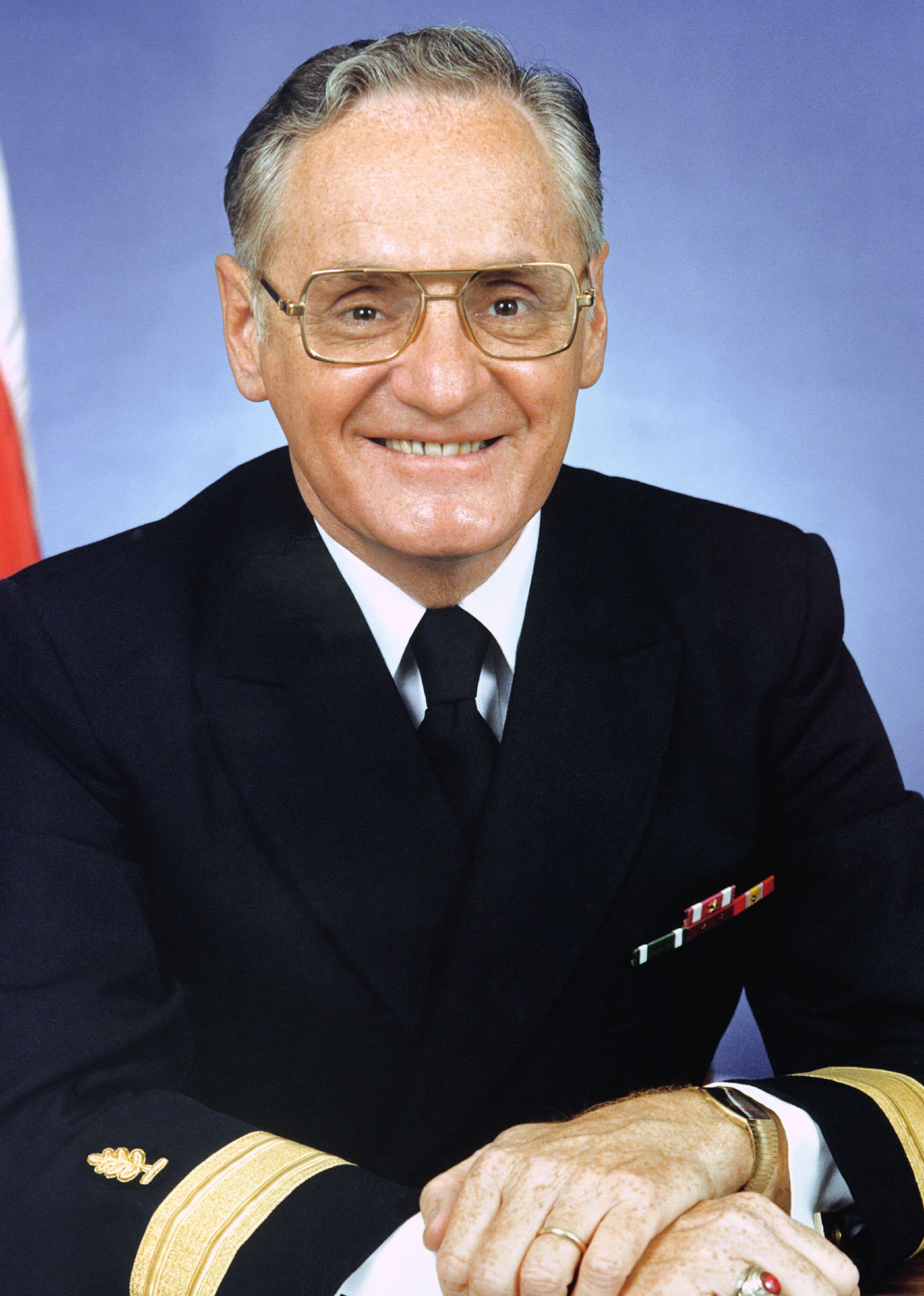
Name	Photo	Term
RADM Matthew Case		2022–Present
RDML Timothy H. Weber		2019–2022
RDML Anne M. Swap		2015-2019
RDML Terry J. Moulton		2012-2015
RDML Eleanor V. Valentin		2009–2012
RADM Michael Mittelman		2006–2009
CAPT Brian G. Brannman		2004–2006
RADM J. Philip Van Landingham		1999–2004
RADM H. Edward Phillips		1995–1999
RADM S. Todd Fisher		1993–1995
RADM Charles Loar		1991–1993
RADM Donald Shuler		1987–1991
RADM Lewis Angelo		1982–1978
CAPT Paul Nelson		1978–1982
CAPT William Green Jr.		1976–1978
CAPT Albert Schwab		1973–1976
CAPT Emmett VanLandingham		1968–1973
CAPT Robert Hermann		1962–1968
CAPT Leo J. Elsasser		1958–1962
CAPT Willard C. Caukins		1954–1958

== Mission of the Medical Service Corps ==
The Medical Service Corps actively supports the Navy and Marine Corps team and Navy Medicine's readiness and health benefits missions with a community of active duty and reserve component professionals.

== Organization ==
The Navy Medical Service Corps was created on 4 August 1947 by act of the United States Congress. Originally it had four specialist sections: Supply and Administration, Optometry, Allied Sciences, and Pharmacy. Currently the Navy Medical Service Corps has three sections: Healthcare Administration, Healthcare Sciences, and Clinical Care Providers.

Healthcare Sciences are subdivided into the following fields of specialty:

- Aerospace Experimental Psychology
- Aerospace Physiology
- Biochemistry
- Entomology
- Environmental Health
- Industrial Hygiene
- Medical Technology
- Microbiology
- Research Physiology
- Radiation Health
- Research Psychology

Clinical Care Providers are subdivided into the following fields of specialty:

- Audiology
- Clinical Psychology
- Dietitian/Food Management
- Occupational Therapy
- Optometry
- Pharmacy
- Physical Therapy
- Physician Assistant
- Podiatry
- Social Work

== See also ==
- Medical Service Corps (U.S. Army)
- Medical Specialist Corps (U.S. Army)
- Biomedical Sciences Corps (U.S. Air Force)
- Medical Service Corps (U.S. Air Force)
