= Naval Hospital Guam =

U.S. Navy medical facility in Guam

Coordinates: 13.47401°N 144.73786°E

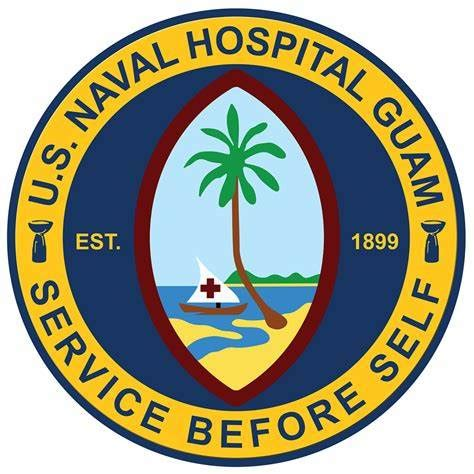
- U.S. Naval Hospital Guam logo
- Active: 1899-1944, 1954-present
- Country: Guam
- Allegiance: United States
- Branch: United States Navy
- Type: Hospital
- Part of: Naval Medical Forces Pacific, Bureau of Medicine and Surgery; Joint Region Marianas
- Garrison/HQ: Building 50, Farenholt Ave, Agana Heights, Guam 96910
- Nickname: USNH Guam
- Motto: Service Before Self

Commanders
- Current commander: Captain James G. Demitrack

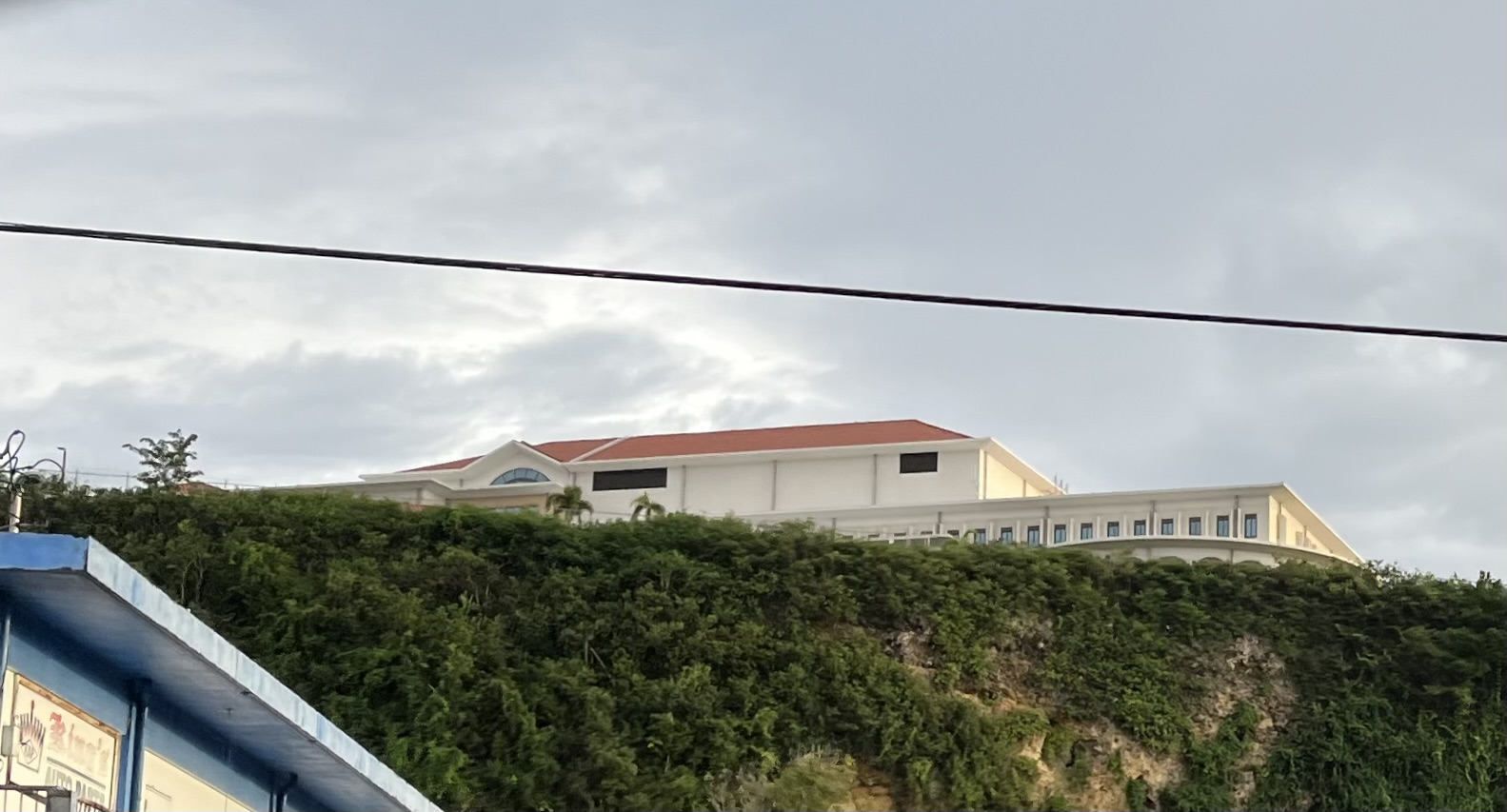
Naval Hospital Guam as seen from S. Marine Corps Dr.

United States Naval Hospital Guam is a U.S. Navy medical facility on the U.S. territory of Guam. It provides a broad range of medical services to active-duty U.S. military personnel under Joint Region Marianas. Besides the main hospital, the hospital runs a medical clinic and a dental clinic on Naval Base Guam.

Established in 1899 in the capital of Hagåtña, it offered general care to the population up until Japanese invasion in 1941. Local CHamoru staff continued to offer medical care during the Japanese occupation until the hospital was destroyed in the U.S. liberation. The hospital was re-established in its current location in Agana Heights in 1954 and treated many casualties from the Vietnam War.

== History ==
=== To World War II ===
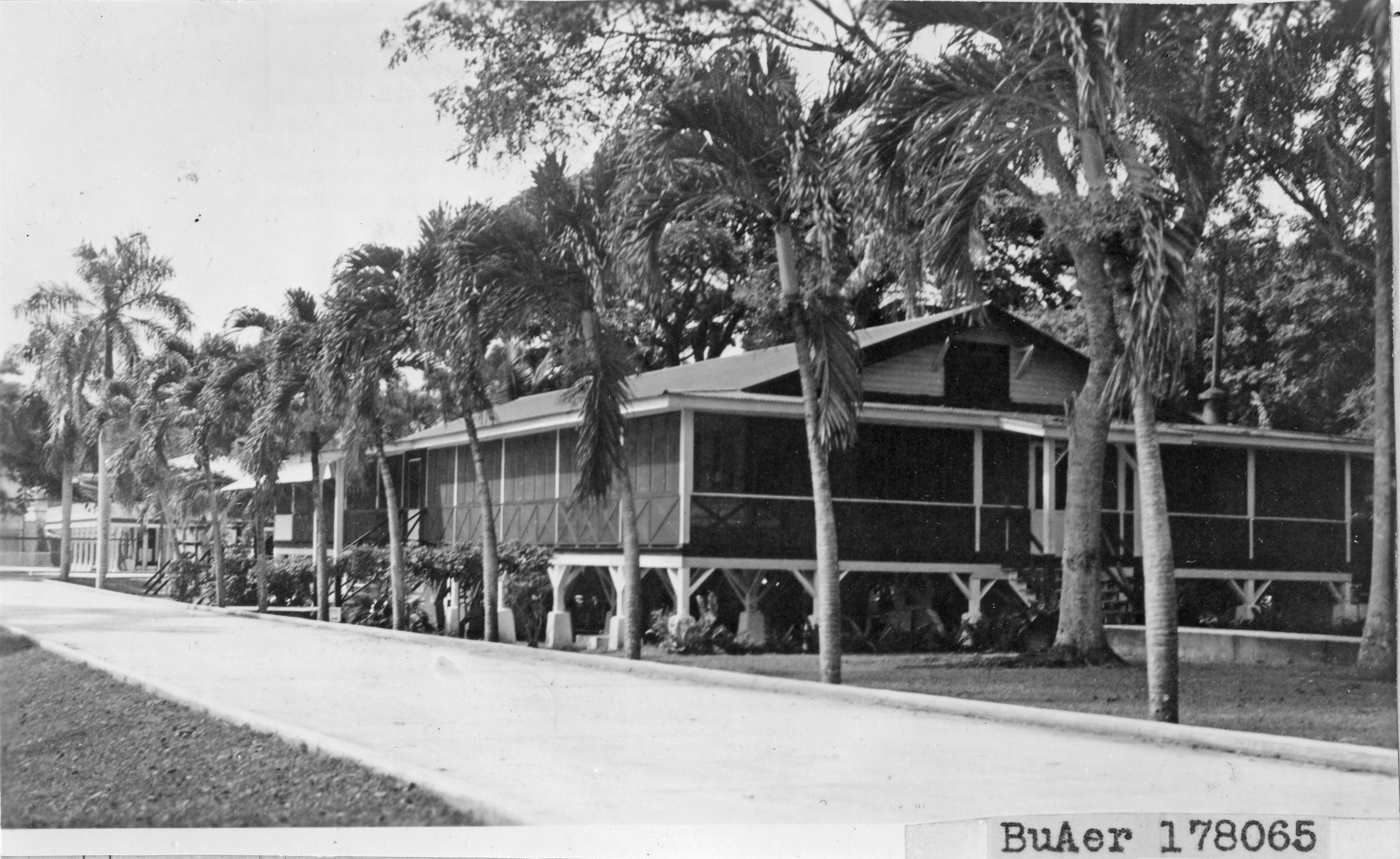
The Naval Hospital, December 1941

The hospital traces its history to the year after the U.S. Capture of Guam in the Spanish–American War. In August 1899, the USS Yosemite arrived and Surgeon Philip Leach set about siting and establishing a "Naval Hospital and Dispensary at Agana [now Hagåtña]." The sole medical providers on the island at this time were suruhånus and suruhånas, traditional CHamoru healers. Between August 1899 and July 1900, the Naval hospital treated 1,141 civilian patients, out of a civilian population of 9,630. Recognizing the need for more medical personnel, the Navy began training local people, graduating the first Western-trained midwives in 1901.

Maria Schroeder, the wife of Guam's second governor Seaton Schroeder, fundraised for a hospital to serve the local populace, resulting in the Maria Schroeder Hospital, which opened in 1902. The naval hospital treated active duty military personnel and locals who could not afford the fees at the Schroeder Hospital. The naval hospital was destroyed in an earthquake in September 1902. A part of the Schroeder Hospital was used to treat active duty personnel until the naval hospital could be rebuilt.

Naval medical personnel staffed both the Schroeder Hospital and the Susana Hospital, a part of the Schroeder Hospital that treated women and children from 1905. An earthquake in December 1909 destroyed the Susana Hospital and the Federal government appropriated money for a replacement hospital, with the provision that it must be named U.S. Naval Hospital, Guam.

In August 1910, the land on which the Shroeder Hospital was located was ceded to the U.S. Federal government and a new Susana Hospital was built. The two hospitals collectively became U.S. Naval Hospital Guam. It became the only U.S. Naval Hospital with a ward for women and children. The first Navy nurses arrived in 1910 as well, starting a formal nursing school. In 1916, a tuberculosis ward was opened.

The interwar years were relatively quiet for the hospital. In 1940, Naval Base Guam's staff comprised nine doctors, one dentist, two pharmacists, five Navy nurses, 46 pharmacist's mates, seven hospital apprentices, and 14 CHamoru nurses. Among the doctors was Ramon Sablan, the first CHamoru doctor and composer of "Stand Ye Guamanians," the territory's anthem.

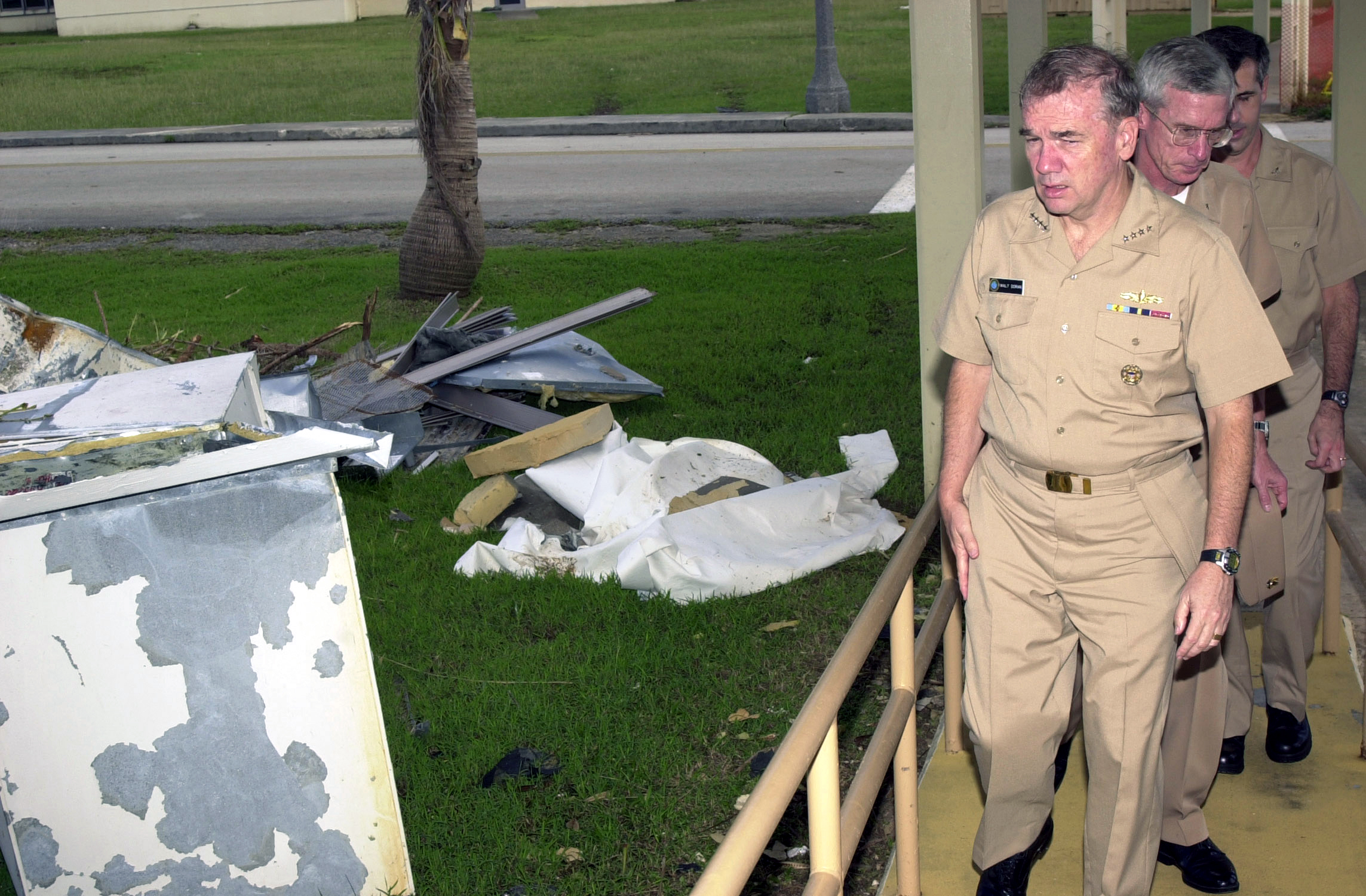
Adm. Walter Doran, Commander Pacific Fleet, inspects damage to Naval Hospital Guam from Typhoon Pongsona, 2002

In December 1941, Guam was invaded by Japan and all hospital personnel were captured. The staff from the mainland U.S. were sent to the prisoner of war camp in Zentsūji, Japan, in January 1942. For the remainder of the Japanese occupation of Guam, Sablan and the 14 CHamoru nurses were almost the only providers of medical care to the local populace. The village of Hagåtña, including the hospital, was demolished by American naval bombardment during the liberation of Guam in August 1944.

=== After World War II ===
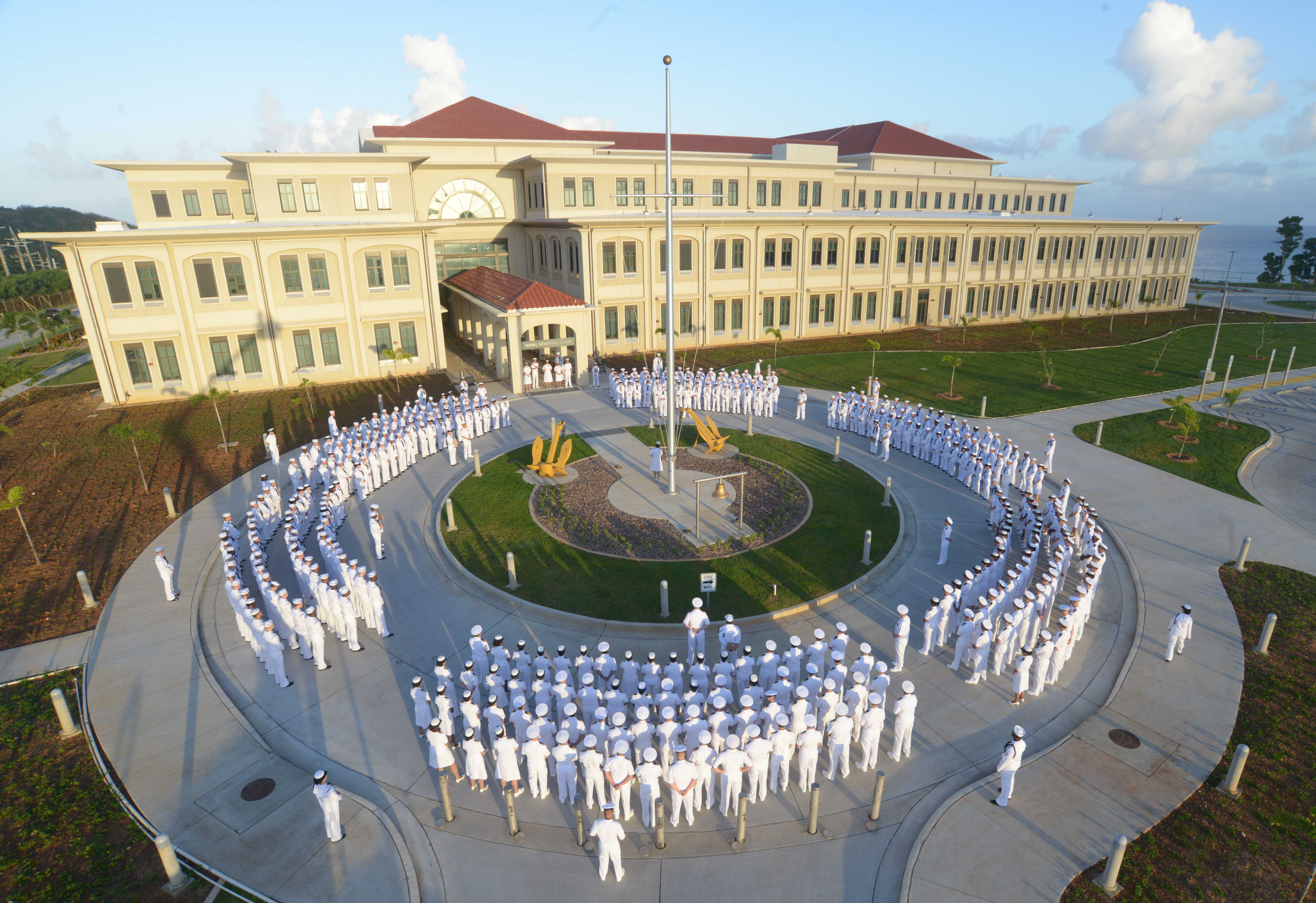
The annual dress whites inspection for hospital personnel, 2015

For the remainder of the Pacific War, medical care to the 100,000 military personnel on Guam was provided by fleet hospitals made largely of Quonset huts. Meanwhile, Fleet Hospital 103 in Oka, Tamuning, was given responsibility for treating the local population. Guam Memorial Hospital was opened on the site of Fleet Hospital 103 in 1954. By the late 1940s, Naval Hospital Guam had taken over care of military patients, but did not have a permanent home. In 1954, Naval Hospital Guam was constructed at its current location in Agana Heights. It served active duty personnel, dependents, military retirees, and veterans.

In 1965, USNH Guam received its first American casualties from the Vietnam War. The number of daily patients being treated increased from about 100 to over 700 in 1968 and 1969. To handle the influx, the Navy renovated the former Asan Point Civil Service Community to handle 1,200 patients. It was reopened in 1968 as the self-contained Advanced Base Naval Hospital, also referred to as the Asan Annex.

Planes transported patients four times a week from Da Nang to Andersen Air Force Base, with a brief stop at Clark Air Force Base. As the Vietnam War drew to a close in 1973, the Annex was closed and Naval Base Guam returned to treating local military personnel, dependents, as well as acting as a Veterans Hospital and regional trauma center.

U.S. Naval Hospital has responded to several emergencies since the Vietnam War. These include:

- Operation New Life (1975), the processing of 100,000 refugees from South Vietnam.
- Operation Fiery Vigil (1991), the evacuation of non-essential military personnel and dependents from the Philippines after the eruption of Mount Pinatubo.
- Operation Pacific Haven (1996-1997), the processing of Iraqi Kurd refugees from the Iraqi Kurdish Civil War.
- Crash of Korean Air Flight 801 (1997), a mass casualty event.
- COVID-19 outbreak aboard the aircraft carrier USS Theodore Roosevelt (2020), requiring construction of an Expeditionary Medical Support System on Naval Base Guam to treat COVID-19 patients.

== Education ==
In regards to the Department of Defense Education Activity (DoDEA), the naval hospital is in the school transportation zone for McCool Elementary and McCool Middle School, while Guam High School is the island's sole DoDEA high school.

Non-DoDEA public schools are operated by the Guam Department of Education.

== See also ==
- US military installations in Guam
