= Paul M. McDonald =

Guamanian politician

Mayor of Agana Heights
- In office January 4, 1993 – January 4, 2025
- Preceded by: Frank M. Portusach
- Succeeded by: Richard Arroyo

Personal details
- Born: Paul Matthew McDonald; May 19, 1955 Agana Heights, Guam
- Died: August 26, 2025 (aged 70) Agana Heights, Guam
- Party: Republican
- Spouse: Elaine Zanoni McDonald

Paul M. McDonald (1955/1956 – 2025) was a Guamanian politician who served as mayor of Agana Heights for 32 consecutive years. Elected first in 1993 and retiring in 2025. He was the longest serving elected official in Guam, and never lost an election.

Political offices
Preceded by Frank M. Portusach	Mayor of Agana Heights; 1993–2025	Succeeded by Richard Arroyo
