= Agana Heights, Guam =

Coordinates: 13°28′06″N 144°44′45″E

Agana Heights Tutuhan
- Village
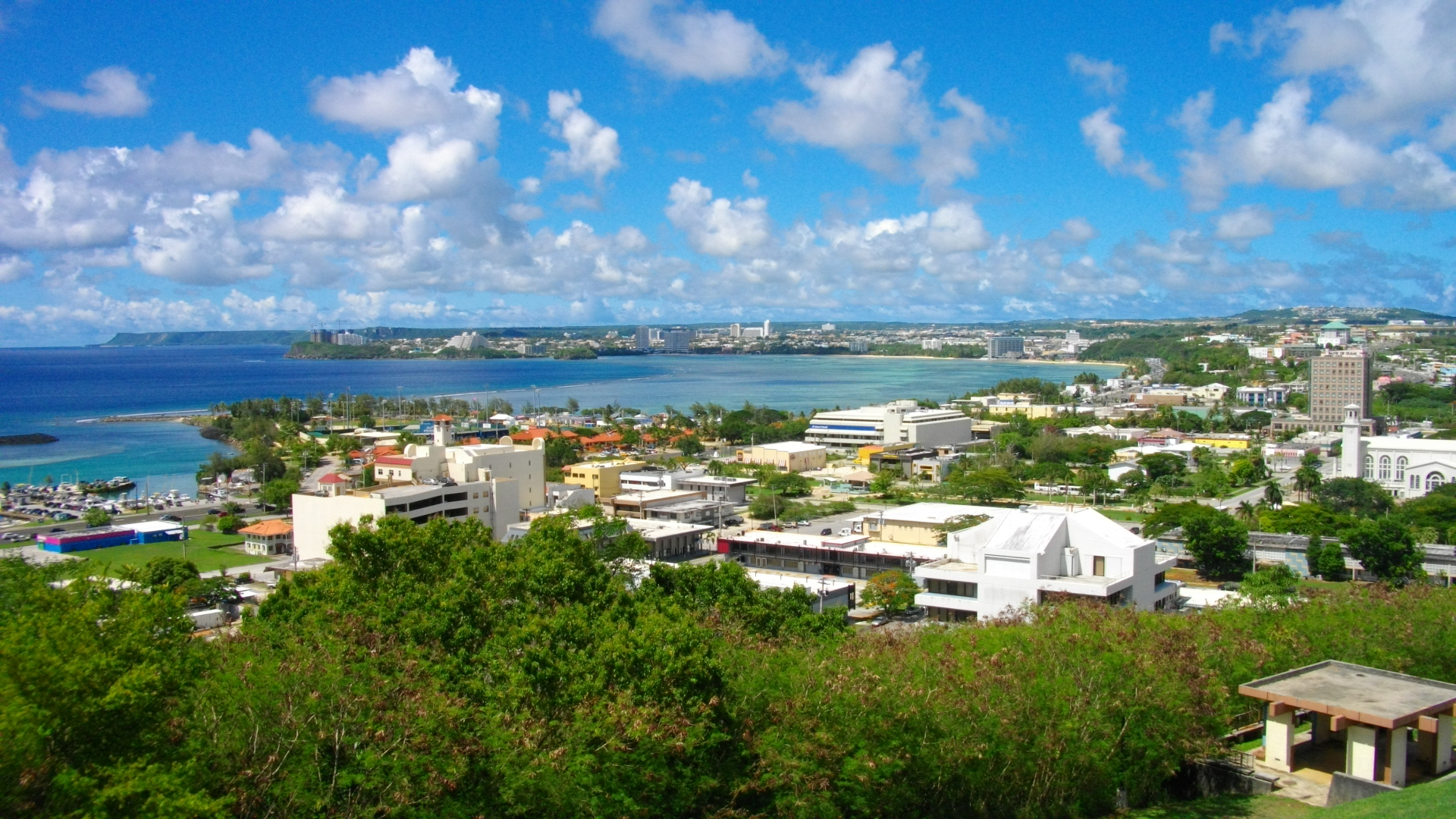
- From Mesa (Santa Agueda): view of Hagatna

- Location of Agana Heights within the Territory of Guam.
- Country: United States
- Territory: Guam

Government
  - Mayor: Richard Arroyo (D)

Population (2020)
  - Total: 3,673
- Time zone: UTC+10 (ChST)
- ZIP code: 96919
- Village Flower: Bougainvillea spectabilis Puti Tai Nobio

Agana Heights (Chamorro: Tutuhan) is one of the nineteen villages in the United States territory of Guam. It is located in the hills south of Hagåtña (formerly Agana), in the central part of the island. United States Naval Hospital Guam is located in this largely residential village.

Historical population
| Census | Pop. | Note | %± |
|---|---|---|---|
| 1960 | 3,210 | | — |
| 1970 | 3,156 | | −1.7% |
| 1980 | 3,284 | | 4.1% |
| 1990 | 3,646 | | 11.0% |
| 2000 | 3,940 | | 8.1% |
| 2010 | 3,808 | | −3.4% |
| 2020 | 3,673 | | −3.5% |

== Demographics ==
The U.S. Census Bureau has the municipality in multiple census-designated places: Agana Heights, and U.S. Naval Hospital.

== Education ==
The village is served by the Guam Public School System Agana Heights Elementary School is in Agana Heights. Jose Rios Middle School in Piti serves sections of Agana Heights south of Tutujan Drive. George Washington High School in Mangilao serves the village.

In regards to the Department of Defense Education Activity (DoDEA), Agana Heights is in the school transportation zone for McCool Elementary and McCool Middle School, while Guam High School is the island's sole DoDEA high school. Guam High School is in Agana Heights.

The Guam Adventist Academy was located in the village until it moved into its current Yona campus, which the institution secured in 1963.

== Notable residents ==
- Carl Gutierrez – former Governor of Guam (1995–2003)
- Geri Gutierrez – former First Lady of Guam (1995–2003)
- Paul M. McDonald – mayor of Agana Heights
- Sean Reid-Foley – MLB pitcher for the New York Mets

== Government ==
Commissioner of Agana Heights
| Name | Term begin | Term end |
| Beldad S. Santos | 1944 | 1946 |
| Anselmo Garrido | 1946 | 1953 |
| Juan L. Pangelinan | 1956 | 1969 |
| Juan E. Garcia | 1969 | January 1, 1973 |

Mayor of Agana Heights
| Name | Party | Term begin | Term end |
| Juan E. Garcia | Republican | January 1, 1973 | January 3, 1977 |
| Frank M. Portusach | Democratic | January 3, 1977 | January 4, 1993 |
| Paul M. McDonald | Republican | January 4, 1993 | January 4, 2025 |
| Richard Arroyo | Democratic | January 4, 2025 | present |

== See also ==
- Villages of Guam
