= 2010 United States House of Representatives election in Guam =

United States House of Representatives of Guam
- November 2, 2010
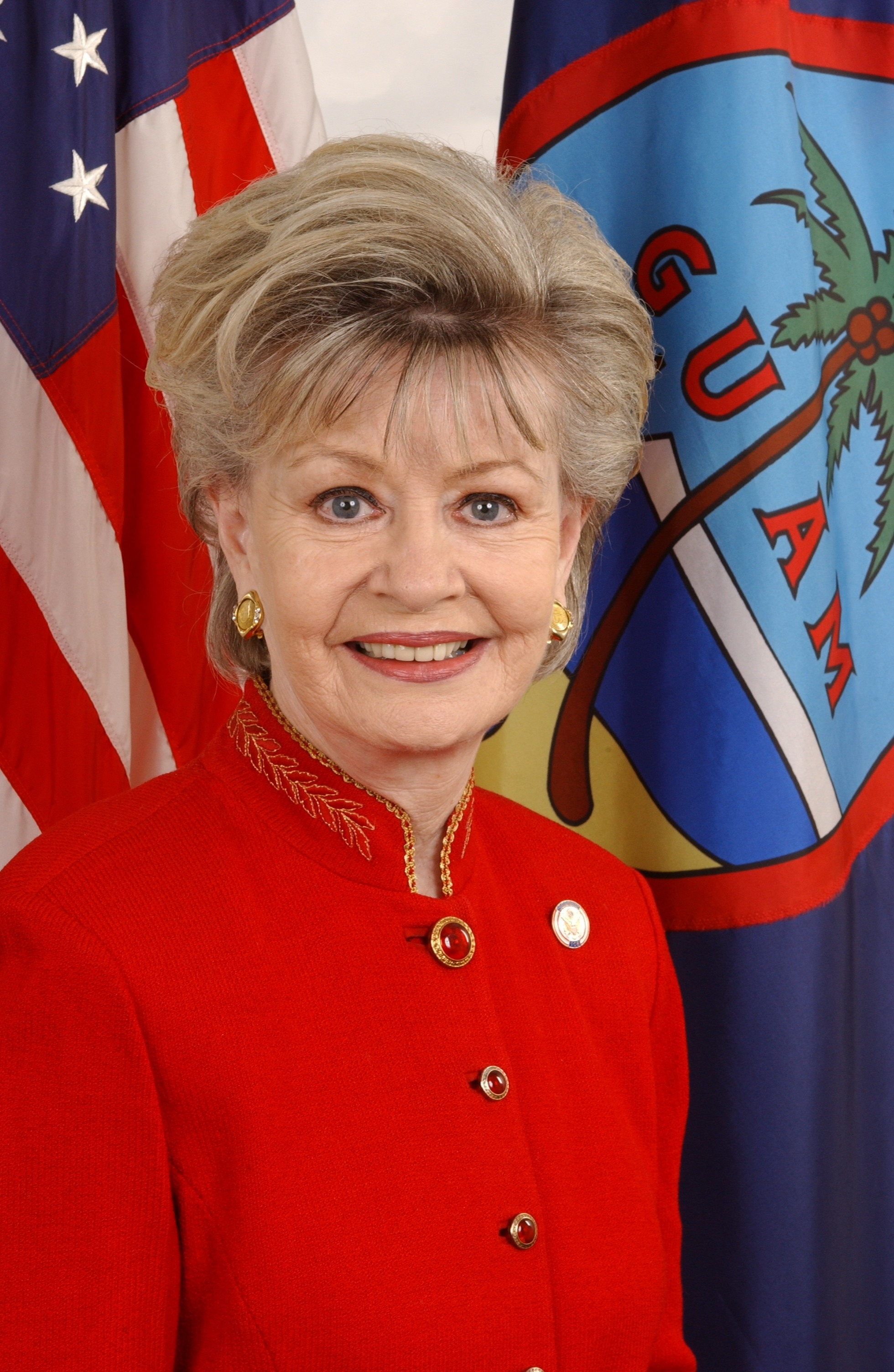
Nominee	Madeleine Bordallo (unopposed)
Party	Democratic
Popular vote	29,389
Percentage	98.77%
Delegate before election
Madeleine Bordallo
Democratic
Elected Delegate
Madeleine Bordallo
Democratic

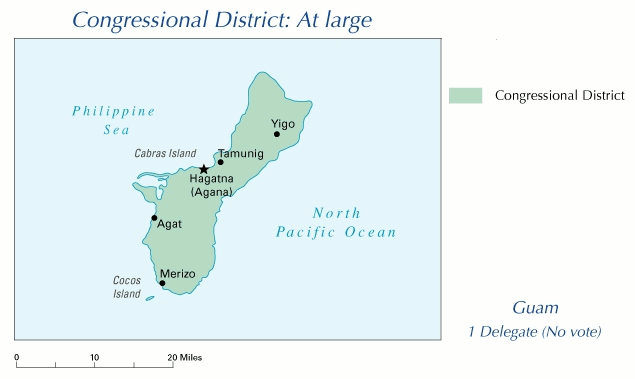
Guam's at-large congressional district

The 2010 Congressional election for the delegate from Guam's at-large congressional district was held on November 2, 2010.

The non-voting delegate to the United States House of Representatives from Guam is elected for two-year terms. Incumbent Democrat Madeleine Bordallo sought re-election in 2010 and was unopposed in the race. The election coincided with the 2010 midterm elections.

== Primary election ==
Bordallo was unopposed in the Democratic primary, which was held September 4, 2010.

Democratic Primary results
Party	Candidate	Votes	%
Democratic	Madeleine Bordallo (unopposed)	7,633	98.77
Total votes			

== General election ==
Bordallo was unopposed in the general election, which was held November 2, 2010.

Congressional results
Party	Candidate	Votes	%
Democratic	Madeleine Bordallo (unopposed)	29,389	
Total votes			

== See also ==
- 2010 United States House of Representatives election in Guam
