= 1990 Guam general election =

1990 Guamanian general election
- November 6, 1990

Elections were held in Guam on November 6, 1990, to elect several public officials in the federal and territorial government as part of the 1990 United States elections.

== U.S. House of Representatives election ==
=== Primary election ===
1990 Guamanian Delegate to the U.S. House of Representatives primary
Party	Candidate	Votes	%
Republican	Vicente T. Blaz	13,757	50.31%
Democratic	Ben Pangelinan	13,166	48.15%
Write-in		422	1.54%
Total valid votes		27,345	98.02%
Invalid or blank votes		550	1.98%
Total votes		27,785	100.00%

=== General election ===
1990 Guamanian Delegate to the U.S. House of Representatives election
Party	Candidate	Votes	%
Republican	Vicente T. Blaz	21,390	55.99%
Democratic	Ben Pangelinan	16,427	43.00%
Write-in		384	1.01%
Total valid votes		38,201	98.45%
Invalid or blank votes		602	1.55%
Total votes		38,803	100.00%

== Gubernatorial election ==
=== Primary elections ===
1990 Guamanian gubernatorial Republican primary
Party	Candidate	Votes	%
Republican	Joseph Franklin Ada Frank Blas	8,123	100.00%
Total votes		8,123	100.00%

1990 Guamanian gubernatorial Democratic primary
Party	Candidate	Votes	%
Democratic	Madeleine Bordallo Ping Duenas	11,398	60.12%
Democratic	Rudy Sablan Edward Diego Reyes	7,560	39.88%
Total votes		18,958	100.00%

=== General election ===
1990 Guamanian gubernatorial election
Party	Candidate	Votes	%
Republican	Joseph Franklin Ada Frank Blas	20,677	53.08%
Democratic	Madeleine Bordallo Ping Duenas	15,668	40.22%
Write-in		2,608	6.70%
Total votes		38,953	100.00%

== Judicial elections ==
Judge Joaquin V.E. Manibusan retention election
Choice	Votes	%
For	28,643	81.03
Against	6,707	18.97
Total	35,350	100.00
Valid votes	35,360	91.15
Invalid/blank votes	3,432	8.85
Total votes	38,792	100.00

Judge Janet Healy Weeks retention election
Choice	Votes	%
For	26,915	80.43
Against	6,549	19.57
Total	33,464	100.00
Valid votes	33,464	86.27
Invalid/blank votes	5,328	13.73
Total votes	38,792	100.00

== Legislative election ==
=== Primary elections ===
1990 Guamanian legislative Democratic primary
Party	Candidate	Votes	%
Democratic	Joe T. San Agustin	10,069	5.23%
Democratic	Ted S. Nelson	9,956	5.17%
Democratic	Don Parkinson	9,897	5.14%
Democratic	John P. Aguon	9,856	5.12%
Democratic	Carl Gutierrez	9,505	4.93%
Democratic	Franklin Quitugua	9,456	4.91%
Democratic	Pilar C. Lujan	9,447	4.90%
Democratic	Gordon Mailloux	9,384	4.87%
Democratic	Marilyn A.P. Won Pat	9,098	4.72%
Democratic	Elizabeth P. Arriola	9,040	4.69%
Democratic	Herminia D. Dierking	8,984	4.66%
Democratic	Francisco R. Santos	8,585	4.46%
Democratic	David L.G. Shimizu	8,530	4.43%
Democratic	Franklin J. Gutierrez	7,700	4.00%
Democratic	Jack S. Smimizu	7,436	3.86%
Democratic	Vince Leon Guerrero	7,391	3.84%
Democratic	Raymond S. Laguana	6,104	3.17%
Democratic	Edward A. Leon Guerrero	6,071	3.15%
Democratic	George F. Taitano	5,933	3.08%
Democratic	Anthony M. Quitugua	5,623	2.92%
Democratic	Joseph C. Carbullido	4,847	2.52%
Democratic	Frank T. Mafnas	4,526	2.35%
Democratic	Enrique S.M. Aflague	4,501	2.34%
Democratic	Vicki Gayer	4,193	2.18%
Democratic	Ed Sumang	3,521	1.83%
Democratic	Wallace H. Roberto	2,995	1.55%
Total votes		192,648	100.00%

1990 Guamanian legislative Republican primary
Party	Candidate	Votes	%
Republican	Thomas V.C. Tanaka	8,431	5.54%
Republican	Antonio R. Upingo	8,383	5.50%
Republican	Doris F. Brooks	8,188	5.38%
Republican	Joseph G. Bamba Jr.	8,171	5.37%
Republican	Marilyn D.A. Manibusan	8,108	5.32%
Republican	Tony Blaz	8,084	5.31%
Republican	Ernesto M. Espaldon	7,801	5.12%
Republican	Edward R. Duenas	7,780	5.11%
Republican	Martha C. Ruth	7,703	5.06%
Republican	Rosa G.R. Carter	6,947	4.56%
Republican	Michael J. Reidy	6,713	4.41%
Republican	Leslie D. Moreno	6,533	4.29%
Republican	Nancy T. Leon Guerrero	5,927	3.89%
Republican	James G. Miles	5,723	3.76%
Republican	Conrad Stinson	5,463	3.59%
Republican	Fe V. Ovalles	5,401	3.55%
Republican	Joseph S. Cruz	5,355	3.52%
Republican	Francisco P. Acfalle	5,145	3.38%
Republican	Betty Y.B. Santos	4,881	3.20%
Republican	Juan M. Taijito	4,870	3.20%
Republican	Roke B. Santos	4,725	3.10%
Republican	Armando S. Dominguez	4,385	2.88%
Republican	Allan S. Perez	4,069	2.67%
Republican	Richie Arellano	3,509	2.30%
Total votes		152,295	100.00%

=== General election ===
1990 Guamanian legislative election
Party	Candidate	Votes	%
Republican	Doris F. Brooks	20,940	3.32%
Republican	Tony Blaz	20,708	3.28%
Democratic	Don Parkinson	20,074	3.18%
Republican	Thomas V.C. Tanaka	20,073	3.18%
Republican	Joseph G. Bamba Jr.	20,009	3.17%
Democratic	Carl Gutierrez	19,979	3.17%
Republican	Antonio R. Unpingoo	19,928	3.16%
Republican	Marilyn D.A. Manibusan	19,569	3.10%
Democratic	Gordon Mailloux	19,034	3.02%
Democratic	Joe T. San Agustin	18,943	3.00%
Republican	Ernesto M. Espaldon	18,265	2.90%
Republican	Edward R. Duenas	18,203	2.89%
Democratic	John P. Aguon	17,846	2.83%
Democratic	Marilyn A.P. Won Pat	17,536	2.78%
Republican	Martha C. Ruth	17,282	2.74%
Democratic	Elizabeth P. Arriola	16,969	2.69%
Democratic	Pilar C. Lujan	16,873	2.67%
Democratic	David L.G. Shimizu	16,862	2.67%
Democratic	Herminia D. Dierking	16,722	2.65%
Democratic	Francisco R. Santos	16,054	2.54%
Republican	Michael J. Reidy	15,919	2.52%
Democratic	Ted S. Nelson	15,640	2.48%
Democratic	Mark C. Charfauros	15,236	2.42%
Democratic	Franklin J.A. Quitugua	14,894	2.36%
Republican	Rosa G.R. Carter	14,572	2.31%
Republican	Leslie D. Moreno	14,349	2.27%
Democratic	Franklin J. Gutierrez	14,153	2.24%
Democratic	Vince Leon Guerrero	13,427	2.13%
Republican	Fe V. Ovalles	13,019	2.06%
Republican	James G. Miles	12,956	2.05%
Democratic	Jack S. Shimizu	12,839	2.04%
Republican	Nancy T. Leon Guerrero	11,904	1.89%
Republican	Conrad Stinson	10,310	1.63%
Democratic	Edward A. Leon Guerrero	10,199	1.62%
Democratic	Raymond S. Laguana	9,942	1.58%
Democratic	Anthony M. Quitugua	9,750	1.55%
Republican	Juan M. Taijito	8,921	1.41%
Republican	Francisco P. Acfalle	8,626	1.37%
Republican	Betty Y.B. Santos	8,292	1.31%
Republican	Joseph S. Cruz	8,271	1.31%
Republican	Roke B. Santos	8,008	1.27%
Democratic	George F. Taitano	7,767	1.23%
Total votes		630,865	100.00%
