= 1982 Guamanian legislative election =

Guam legislative election, 1982
← 1981	November 2, 1982	1983 →

All 21 seats of the Legislature of Guam
	Majority party	Minority party
Leader	Carl T.C. Gutierrez	Tommy Tanaka
Party	Democratic	Republican
Leader's seat	At-large district	At-large district
Last election	10 seats	11 seats
Seats won	14	7
Seat change	▲4	▼4
Popular vote	280,427	243,193
Percentage	53.6	46.4
Speaker before election
Tommy Tanaka
Republican
Elected Speaker
Carl T.C. Gutierrez
Democratic

The 1982 Guam legislative election was held in Guam on November 2, 1982. The Democratic Party won fourteen of the twenty-one seats in the Legislature.

== Results ==
=== Legislature ===
Party	Votes	%	Seats	+/–
Democratic Party	280,427	53.6	14	
Republican Party	243,193	46.4	7	
Total	523,620	100	21	-
Registered voters/turnout		87	–	–
Source: Guam Election Commission. Comparative Analysis Report, Guam - 1983

== Primary Election ==
The primary election is scheduled for the first Saturday in September. For the 1982 election, the primary was held on Saturday, September 4, 1982 for both the Democratic Party of Guam and the Republican Party of Guam. The 21 at-large candidates from each party who receive the most votes go on to the general election.

=== Candidates ===
==== Democratic ====
- John P. Aguon
- Elizabeth P. Arriola
- Ching L. Barro
- Joaquin C. Camacho
- Edward T. Charfauros (I)
- Vicente P. Crawford
- Benjamin J.F. Cruz
- Joseph T. Duenas
- Joseph T. Gumataotao
- Carl Gutierrez (I)
- Franklin J. Gutierrez
- Marcia K. Hartsock
- Manuel Hechanova
- Pilar C. Lujan
- Maria C.P. Mad
- Joseph D. Mendiola
- Ted S. Nelson
- Sam S. Paik
- Don Parkinson
- Bruce G. Perez
- John F. Quan (I)
- Franklin Quitugua (I)
- Gene Ramsey
- James Rhodes
- Alfred F. Sablan
- Herman D. Sablan
- Joe T. San Agustin (I)
- Francisco R. Santos (I)
- Jose B. Sarmiento
- Ramon Q. Sudo (I)
- John S. Taitano
- Ray Tongson
- Lloyd L. Umagat (I)
- Antonio C. Yamashita

==== Republican ====
- Joseph F. Ada
- Tommy Tanaka (I)
- Marilyn D.A. Manibusan
- Edward R. Duenas (I)
- Antonio "Tony" R. Unpingco (I)
- Alberto C. Lamorena, III (I)
- James H. Underwood (I)
- Tommy C. Crisostomo (I)
- Peter Alexcis D. Ada
- Gregorio S. Calvo
- Jess Q. Torres (I)
- Vicente "Ben" D. Ada
- T. Frank Flores
- Nancy T. Leon Guerrero
- Angel A.R. Sablan
- Francis M. Perez
- James R. Cruz
- George A. Santos
- Norberto "Bert" R. Unpingco
- Carmen A. Kasperbauer (I)
- Joseph "Joe" Dizon
- Jose S. Mantanona
- Jim Miles
- Norbert F. Ungacta
- John A. Kinsella
- Gil T. Shinohara
- Lagrimas F. Aflague
- Mark Martinez
- Concepcion Cruz Barrett
- Ernesto Cid
- Edward J. Cenzon
- Luis A. Devera
- Mariona B. Santos
- Ed Senato

=== Results ===
==== Democratic ====
Democratic Party of Guam primary election, 1982
Party	Candidate	Votes	%	±%
Democratic	Carl Gutierrez	7,448		
Democratic	Francisco R. Santos	7,387		
Democratic	Franklin Quitugua	7,385		
Democratic	Elizabeth P. Arriola	7,377		
Democratic	Ted S. Nelson	7,334		
Democratic	Joe T. San Agustin	7,196		
Democratic	Joaquin C. Camacho	7,177		
Democratic	Franklin J. Gutierrez	7,122		
Democratic	Joseph T. Duenas	7,105		
Democratic	John P. Aguon	7,071		
Democratic	Gene Ramsey	7,001		
Democratic	Pilar C. Lujan	6,936		
Democratic	John F. Quan	6,824		
Democratic	Alfred F. Sablan	6,731		
Democratic	Benjamin J.F. Cruz	6,573		
Democratic	Edward T. Charfauros	6,546		
Democratic	John S. Taitano	6,535		
Democratic	Don Parkinson	6,198		
Democratic	Antonio C. Yamashita	6,181		
Democratic	Marcia K. Hartsock	5,891		
Democratic	Herman D. Sablan	5,749		
Democratic	Ramon Q. Sudo	5,744		
Democratic	James Rhodes	5,259		
Democratic	Joseph D. Mendiola	4,834		
Democratic	Lloyd L. Umagat	4,708		
Democratic	Jose B. Sarmiento	4,632		
Democratic	Bruce G. Perez	4,401		
Democratic	Sam S. Paik	4,381		
Democratic	Joseph T. Gumataotao	4,366		
Democratic	Maria C.P. Mad	3,973		
Democratic	Vicente P. Crawford	3,494		
Democratic	Ching L. Barro	2,850		
Democratic	Ray Tongson	2,300		
Democratic	Manuel Hechanova	2,057		
Turnout		196,766		

==== Republican ====
Republican Party of Guam primary election, 1982
Party	Candidate	Votes	%	±%
Republican	Joseph F. Ada	8,606		
Republican	Tommy Tanaka	7,927		
Republican	Marilyn D.A. Manibusan	6,814		
Republican	Edward R. Duenas	6,611		
Republican	Antonio R. Unpingco	6,562		
Republican	Alberto C. Lamorena, III	6,510		
Republican	James H. Underwood	6,219		
Republican	Tommy C. Crisostomo	6,184		
Republican	Peter A.D. Ada	6,015		
Republican	Gregorio S. Calvo	5,901		
Republican	Jess Q. Torres	5,690		
Republican	Ben D. Ada	5,628		
Republican	T. Frank Flores	5,492		
Republican	Nancy T. Leon Guerrero	5,262		
Republican	Angel A.R. Sablan	5,141		
Republican	Francis M. Perez	5,023		
Republican	James R. Cruz	4,846		
Republican	George A. Santos	4,811		
Republican	Bert R. Unpingco	4,730		
Republican	Carmen A. Kasperbauer	4,390		
Republican	Joe Dizon	4,309		
Republican	Jose S. Mantanona	4,195		
Republican	Jim Miles	4,182		
Republican	Norbert F. Ungacta	4,160		
Republican	John A. Kinsella	4,093		
Republican	Gil T. Shinohara	4,083		
Republican	Lagrimas F. Aflague	3,844		
Republican	Mark Martinez	3,706		
Republican	Concepcion C. Barrett	3,485		
Republican	Ernesto Cid	2,949		
Republican	Edward J. Cenzon	2,666		
Republican	Luis A. Devera	2,547		
Republican	Mariona B. Santos	2,467		
Republican	Ed Senato	2,457		
Turnout		167,505		

== General election ==
The general election is scheduled for the first Tuesday following the first Monday in November. For the 1982 election, the general election was held on Tuesday, November 2, 1982. The 21 at-large candidates who receive the most votes would be certified and then inaugurated as members of the 17th Guam Legislature on January 3, 1983.

=== Candidates ===
==== Democratic ====
- Carl Gutierrez (I)
- Francisco R. Santos (I)
- Franklin Quitugua (I)
- Elizabeth P. Arriola
- Ted S. Nelson
- Joe T. San Agustin (I)
- Joaquin C. Camacho
- Franklin J. Gutierrez
- Joseph T. Duenas
- John P. Aguon
- Gene Ramsey
- Pilar C. Lujan
- John F. Quan (I)
- Alfred F. Sablan
- Benjamin J.F. Cruz
- Edward T. Charfauros (I)
- John S. Taitano
- Don Parkinson
- Antonio C. Yamashita
- Marcia K. Hartsock
- Herman D. Sablan

==== Republican ====
- Vicente "Ben" D. Ada
- Joseph F. Ada
- Peter Alexcis D. Ada
- Gregorio S. Calvo
- Tommy C. Crisostomo (I)
- James R. Cruz
- Edward R. Duenas (I)
- T. Frank Flores
- Carmen A. Kasperbauer (I)
- Alberto C. Lamorena, III (I)
- Nancy T. Leon Guerrero
- Marilyn D.A. Manibusan
- Francis M. Perez
- Angel A.R. Sablan
- George A. Santos
- Tommy Tanaka (I)
- Jess Q. Torres (I)
- James H. Underwood (I)
- Antonio "Tony" R. Unpingco (I)
- Norberto "Bert" R. Unpingco

=== Results ===
1982 Guam legislative election
Party	Candidate	Votes	%	±%
Republican	Joseph F. Ada	17,570	n/a	n/a
Democratic	Carl T.C. Gutierrez	15,798	n/a	n/a
Republican	Tommy Tanaka	15,345	n/a	n/a
Democratic	Don Parkinson	15,151	n/a	n/a
Democratic	Ted S. Nelson	14,792	n/a	n/a
Republican	Marilyn D.A. Manibusan	14,691	n/a	n/a
Democratic	Elizabeth P. Arriola	14,436	n/a	n/a
Democratic	Joe T. San Agustin	14,354	n/a	n/a
Democratic	Franklin J. Gutierrez	14,307	n/a	n/a
Democratic	Edward "Ed" T. Charfauros	14,205	n/a	n/a
Democratic	Franklin Quitugua	14,060	n/a	n/a
Democratic	Marcia K. Hartsock	13,699	n/a	n/a
Democratic	Francisco R. Santos	13,648	n/a	n/a
Republican	Edward R. Duenas	13,647	n/a	n/a
Democratic	Gene Ramsey	13,559	n/a	n/a
Democratic	John P. Aguon	13,536	n/a	n/a
Democratic	John F. Quan	13,498	n/a	n/a
Republican	Antonio R. Unpingco	13,151	n/a	n/a
Republican	Alberto C. Lamorena, III	12,831	n/a	n/a
Republican	James H. Underwood	12,690	n/a	n/a
Democratic	Pilar C. Lujan	12,603	n/a	n/a
Democratic	Joseph T. Duenas	12,514	n/a	n/a
Democratic	Antonio C. Yamashita	12,476	n/a	n/a
Democratic	Alfred F. Sablan	12,341	n/a	n/a
Democratic	Benjamin J.F. Cruz	12,199	n/a	n/a
Republican	Joe Dizon	11,961	n/a	n/a
Republican	Tommy C. Crisostomo	11,286	n/a	n/a
Democratic	Joaquin C. Camacho	11,360	n/a	n/a
Republican	Jess Q. Torres	11,022	n/a	n/a
Democratic	John S. Taitano	11,011	n/a	n/a
Republican	Angel A.R. Sablan	10,973	n/a	n/a
Democratic	Herman D. Sablan	10,880	n/a	n/a
Republican	Nancy T. Leon Guerrero	10,334	n/a	n/a
Republican	Bert R. Unpingco	10,332	n/a	n/a
Republican	Ben Ada	10,310	n/a	n/a
Republican	Peter A.D. Ada	10,289	n/a	n/a
Republican	Gregorio S. Calvo	9,772	n/a	n/a
Republican	T. Frank Flores	9,746	n/a	n/a
Republican	James R. Cruz	9,581	n/a	n/a
Republican	Carmen A. Kasperbauer	9,487	n/a	n/a
Republican	George A. Santos	9,226	n/a	n/a
Republican	Francis M. Perez	8,949	n/a	n/a
Majority		280,427		
Turnout		523,620		
Democratic gain from Republican				

== Incoming Senators to the 17th Guam Legislature ==
There were 21 senators elected on November 2, 1982 to serve in the 17th Guam Legislature:

=== Democratic ===
==== Incumbents ====
- Edward T. Charfauros
- Carl Gutierrez
- John F. Quan
- Franklin Quitugua
- Joe T. San Agustin
- Francisco R. Santos

==== Freshmen ====
- John P. Aguon
- Elizabeth P. Arriola
- Franklin J. Gutierrez
- Marcia K. Hartsock
- Pilar C. Lujan
- Ted S. Nelson
- Don Parkinson
- Gene Ramsey

=== Republican ===
==== Incumbents ====
- Edward R. Duenas
- Alberto C. Lamorena, III
- Tommy Tanaka
- James H. Underwood
- Antonio R. Unpingco

==== Freshmen ====
- Joseph F. Ada (returning)
- Marilyn D.A. Manibusan
