= List of people from Guam =

Flag of Guam

Numerous notable people have lived in or come from Guam.

== Entertainment ==
- Jason Barnes (born 1989)
- Nathaniel Berg
- Q. Allan Brocka (born 1972)
- Ann Curry (born 1956)
- Mickey Faerch (born 1956)
- Dan Ho
- Pia Mia (born 1996)
- Donovan Patton (born 1978)
- DPR Live (born 1993)

== Games and athletics ==
- Morgan Hikaru Aiken (born 1994)
- Darrick Bollinger (born 1978)
- James Borja
- Frank Camacho (born 1989)
- Mike Cassidy
- Jeff Cobb (born 1982)
- Jason Cunliffe (born 1983)
- Joe Duarte (born 1983)
- Christopher Duenas (born 1991)
- Frank Flores (born 1969)
- Ray Flores (born 1974)
- Michael Genereux
- Derek Mandell (born 1986)
- Victoria Muniz (born 1989)
- Julius Naranjo (born 1991)
- Daniel O'Keeffe (born 1972)
- Sean Reid-Foley (born 1995)
- Ray Robson (born 1994)
- Adrian Romero (born 1972)
- Patrick Sagisi (born 1971)
- Benjamin Schulte (born 1995)
- Pilar Shimizu (born 1996)
- Jagger Stephens (born 1998)
- William Stinnett (born 1985)
- Jon Tuck (born 1984)
- Wil Yamamoto (born 1974)

== Business ==
- Eloise Baza (1953–2007)

== Diplomacy ==
- Yuri Kim

== Lawyers ==
- Leevin Camacho
- Benjamin Cruz (born 1951)
- Alicia Limtiaco (born 1963)
- Douglas Moylan (born 1966)
- Don Parkinson (1942–2020)

== Military ==
- Peter Gumataotao (born 1958)
- Curtis W. Howard (1917–1942)
- Susan Pangelinan (born 1961)

== Politics ==
=== Activists ===
- Siobhon McManus

=== Delegates ===
- Vicente T. Blaz (1928–2014)
- Madeleine Bordallo (born 1933)
- Michael San Nicolas (born 1981)
- Robert A. Underwood (born 1948)
- Antonio Borja Won Pat (1908–1987)

=== Governors ===
==== Appointed ====
- Marcellus Boss (1901–1967) (interim)
- William Corbett (1902–1971) (interim)
- Bill Daniel (1915–2006)
- Ford Quint Elvidge (1892–1980)
- Joseph Flores (1900–1981)
- Manuel Flores Leon Guerrero (1914–1985)
- Richard Barrett Lowe (1902–1972)
- Carlton Skinner (1913–2004)

==== Elected ====
- Joseph Franklin Ada (born 1943)
- Ricardo Bordallo (1927–1990)
- Eddie Calvo (born 1961)
- Paul McDonald Calvo (1934–2024)
- Carlos Camacho (1924–1979)
- Lou Leon Guerrero (born 1950) (current)
- Felix Perez Camacho (born 1957)
- Carl Gutierrez (born 1941)

=== Senators ===
==== Current ====
- Regine Biscoe Lee (born 1981)
- Telena Cruz Nelson (born 1980)
- Kelly Marsh Taitano (born 1964)
- Tina Rose Muña Barnes (born 1962)
- Amanda Shelton (born 1990)
- Pedo Terlaje (1946–2023)
- Therese M. Terlaje (born 1964)

==== Former ====
- Tom Ada (born 1949)
- Frank Aguon (born 1966)
- John P. Aguon
- Elizabeth P. Arriola (1928–2002)
- Madeleine Bordallo (born 1933)
- Ricardo Bordallo (1927–1990)
- Benjamin Cruz (born 1951)
- Herminia D. Dierking (1939–2008)
- Ping Duenas (1930–2009)
- James Espaldon (born 1956)
- Alfred Flores (1916–2009)
- Judith Guthertz
- Carl Gutierrez (born 1941)
- Marcia K. Hartsock (1941–2012)
- Lou Leon Guerrero (born 1950)
- Manuel Flores Leon Guerrero (1914–1985)
- Manuel U. Lujan (1912–1975)
- Pilar C. Lujan
- Tommy Morrison (born 1975)
- Ted S. Nelson (1935–2025)
- Tony Palomo (1931–2013)
- Ben Pangelinan (1955–2014)
- Don Parkinson (1942–2020)
- John F. Quan (1944–1988)
- Franklin Quitugua (1933–2015)
- Ignacio P. Quitugua (1909–1973)
- Edward Diego Reyes (1930–2018)
- Joe T. San Agustin (1930–2021)
- Michael San Nicolas (born 1981)
- Angel Santos (1959–2003)
- Francis E. Santos
- Francisco R. Santos (1930–1993)
- Dave Shimizu
- Nerissa Bretania Underwood (born 1955)
- Antonio Borja Won Pat (1908–1987)
- Judith Won Pat (born 1949)

=== Mayors ===
- John A. Cruz (born 1954)
- Paul M. McDonald (born 1955 or 1956)
- Pedo Terlaje (1946–2023)
- Felix Ungacta (1937–2016)

=== International organizations ===
- Bob Beck (1944–2008)
- Lourdes Pangelinan (born 1954)

=== Other ===
- Walt Nauta, political aide
- Dafne Shimizu (born 1973)
