= 17th Guam Legislature =

The 17th Guam Legislature was a meeting of the Guam Legislature. It convened in Hagatna, Guam on January 3, 1983 and ended on January 7, 1985, during the 1st and 2nd years of Ricardo J. Bordallo's 2nd Gubernatorial Term.

In the 1982 Guamanian legislative election, the Democratic Party of Guam won a fourteen-to-seven (14-7) supermajority of seats in the Guam Legislature.

== Party summary ==
Affiliation	Party (shading indicates majority caucus)		Total
Affiliation	Democratic	Republican	Total
End of previous legislature	10	11	21
Begin	14	7	21
Latest Voting share	66.7%	33.3%	
Beginning of the next legislature	11	10	21

== Membership ==
Senator	Party	Assumed office
Carl T.C. Gutierrez	Democratic	1981
Don Parkinson	Democratic	1983
Ted S. Nelson	Democratic	1983
Elizabeth P. Arriola	Democratic	1983
Joe T. San Agustin	Democratic	1977
Franklin J. Gutierrez	Democratic	1983
Edward T. Charfauros	Democratic	1975
Franklin J.A. Quitugua	Democratic	1977
Marcia K. Hartsock	Democratic	1983
Francisco R. Santos	Democratic	1971
Eugene Ramsey	Democratic	1983
John P. Aguon	Democratic	1983
John F. Quan	Democratic	1979
Pilar C. Lujan	Democratic	1983
Joseph F. Ada	Republican	1983
Thomas V.C. Tanaka	Republican	1975
Marilyn D.A. Manibusan	Republican	1983
Edward R. Duenas	Republican	1975
Antonio R. Unpingco	Republican	1977
Alberto C. Lamorena, III	Republican	1979
James H. Underwood	Republican	1975
