= 22nd Guam Legislature =

The 22nd Guam Legislature was a meeting of the Guam Legislature. It convened in Hagatna, Guam on January 4, 1993, and ended on January 2, 1995, during the 3rd and 4th years of Joseph F. Ada's 2nd Gubernatorial Term.

In the 1992 Guamanian general election, the Democratic Party of Guam won a fourteen-to-seven (14–7) supermajority of seats in the Guam Legislature.

Francisco R. Santos died in 1993. His son, Francis E. Santos ran for and won his vacated seat.

== Party summary ==
Affiliation	Party (shading indicates majority caucus)		Total
Affiliation	Democratic	Republican	Total
End of previous legislature	11	10	21
Begin	14	7	21
Latest Voting share	66.7%	33.3%	
Beginning of the next legislature	13	8	21

== Leadership ==
=== Legislative ===
- Speaker: Joe T. San Agustin
- Vice Speaker:
  - Francisco R. Santos (until August 9, 1993)
  - John P. Aguon (from August 9, 1993)
- Legislative Secretary: Pilar C. Lujan
- Majority Leader: Don Parkinson

== Membership ==
Senator	Party	Assumed office
Thomas C. Ada	Democratic	1993
Madeleine Z. Bordallo	Democratic	April 1991
Carl T.C. Gutierrez	Democratic	1989
Edward Diego Reyes	Democratic	1993
John P. Aguon	Democratic	1989
Joe T. San Agustin	Democratic	1977
David L.G. Shimizu	Democratic	1991
Don Parkinson	Democratic	1983
Pilar C. Lujan	Democratic	1983
Herminia D. Dierking	Democratic	1985
Elizabeth P. Arriola	Democratic	1983
Francisco R. Santos	Democratic	1971 (until 1993)
Vicente C. "Ben" Pangelinan	Democratic	1993
Ted S. Nelson	Democratic	1993
Francis E. Santos	Democratic	1993 (following special election)
Doris Flores Brooks	Republican	1989
Thomas V.C. Tanaka	Republican	1989
Anthony C. Blaz	Republican	1991
Felix P. Camacho	Republican	1993
Antonio R. Unpingco	Republican	1989
Marilyn D.A. Manibusan	Republican	1983
Joseph George Bamba Jr.	Republican	1985
