= 18th Guam Legislature =

The 18th Guam Legislature was a meeting of the Guam Legislature. It convened in Hagatna, Guam on January 7, 1985 and ended on January 5, 1987, during the 3rd and 4th years of Ricardo J. Bordallo's 2nd Gubernatorial Term.

In the 1984 Guamanian general election, the Democratic Party of Guam won an eleven-to-ten (11-10) majority of seats in the Guam Legislature.

== Party summary ==
Affiliation	Party (shading indicates majority caucus)		Total
Affiliation	Democratic	Republican	Total
End of previous legislature	14	7	21
Begin	11	10	21
Latest Voting share	52.4%	47.6%	
Beginning of the next legislature	13	8	21

== Membership ==
Senator	Party	Assumed office
Carl T.C. Gutierrez	Democratic	1981
Joe T. San Agustin	Democratic	1977
Don Parkinson	Democratic	1983
John P. Aguon	Democratic	1983
Francisco R. Santos	Democratic	1971
Ted S. Nelson	Democratic	1983
Elizabeth P. Arriola	Democratic	1983
Franklin J. Gutierrez	Democratic	1983
Pilar C. Lujan	Democratic	1983
Herminia D. Dierking	Democratic	1985
Franklin J.A. Quitugua	Democratic	1977
Joseph F. Ada	Republican	1983
Marilyn D.A. Manibusan	Republican	1983
Thomas V.C. Tanaka	Republican	1975
Antonio R. Unpingco	Republican	1977
Frank F. Blas	Republican	1985
Edward R. Duenas	Republican	1975
Alberto C. Lamorena, III	Republican	1979
Joseph G. Bamba Jr.	Republican	1985
James G. Miles	Republican	1985
Jerry M. Rivera	Republican	1985
