= 23rd Guam Legislature =

1995–1997 legislature

The 23rd Guam Legislature was a meeting of the Guam Legislature. It convened in Hagatna, Guam on January 2, 1995 and ended on January 6, 1997, during the 1st and 2nd years of Carl T.C. Gutierrez's 1st Gubernatorial Term.

In the 1994 Guamanian general election, the Democratic Party of Guam won a thirteen-to-eight (13-8) majority of seats in the Guam Legislature.

It had been expected that Senator Thomas C. "Tom" Ada would be chosen by his colleagues as Speaker of the Guam Legislature, but a group of Democratic and Republican Senators elected Parkinson as Speaker, instead.

== Party summary ==
Affiliation	Party (shading indicates majority caucus)		Total
Affiliation	Democratic	Republican	Total
End of previous legislature	14	7	21
Begin	13	8	21
Latest Voting share	61.9%	38.1%	
Beginning of the next legislature	10	11	21

== Leadership ==
=== Legislative ===
- Speaker: Don Parkinson
- Vice Speaker: Theodore "Ted" S. Nelson
- Legislative Secretary: Judith Won Pat-Borja

== Membership ==
Senator	Party	Assumed office
Thomas C. Ada	Democratic	1993
Judith Won Pat-Borja	Democratic	1995
Sonny L. Orsini	Democratic	1995
Vicente C. "Ben" Pangelinan	Democratic	1993
Don Parkinson	Democratic	1983
Angel L.G. Santos	Democratic	1995
Lourdes A. Leon Guerrero	Democratic	1995
Joe T. San Agustin	Democratic	1977
Ted S. Nelson	Democratic	1993
Francis E. Santos	Democratic	1993
John P. Aguon	Democratic	1989
Mark C. Charfauros	Democratic	1995
Hope A. Cristobal	Democratic	1995
Elizabeth Barrett-Anderson	Republican	1995
Anthony C. Blaz	Republican	1991
Mark Forbes	Republican	1995
Alberto C. Lamorena, V	Republican	1995
Antonio R. Unpingco	Republican	1989
Joanne S. Brown	Republican	1995
Carlotta A. Leon Guerrero	Republican	1995
Felix P. Camacho	Republican	1993
