= 21st Guam Legislature =

Legislative Meeting

The 21st Guam Legislature was a meeting of the Guam Legislature. It convened in Hagatna, Guam, on January 7, 1991, and ended on January 4, 1993, during the first and second years of Joseph F. Ada's second gubernatorial term.

In the 1990 Guamanian general election, the Democratic Party of Guam won an eleven-to-ten (11–10) majority of seats in the Guam Legislature.

Marilyn A. P. Won Pat died on December 15, 1990, before taking office. The vacancy in the legislature caused by her death was filled by a special election held on April 6, 1991, where Madeleine Z. Bordallo was elected.

== Party summary ==
Affiliation	Party (shading indicates majority caucus)		Total
Affiliation	Democratic	Republican	Total
End of previous legislature	13	8	21
Begin	11	10	21
Latest Voting share	52.4%	47.6%	
Beginning of the next legislature	14	7	21

== Membership ==
Senator	Party	Assumed office
Don Parkinson	Democratic	1983
Carl T.C. Gutierrez	Democratic	1989
Gordon Mailloux	Democratic	1989
Joe T. San Agustin	Democratic	1977
John P. Aguon	Democratic	1989
Elizabeth P. Arriola	Democratic	1983
Pilar C. Lujan	Democratic	1983
David L.G. Shimizu	Democratic	1991
Herminia D. Dierking	Democratic	1985
Francisco R. Santos	Democratic	1971
Madeleine Z. Bordallo	Democratic	April 1991
Doris Flores Brooks	Republican	1989
Anthony C. Blaz	Republican	1991
Thomas V.C. Tanaka	Republican	1989
Joseph G. Bamba, Jr.	Republican	1985
Antonio R. Unpingco	Republican	1989
Marilyn D.A. Manibusan	Republican	1983
Ernesto M. Espaldon	Republican	1987
Edward R. Duenas	Republican	1987
Martha C. Ruth	Republican	1987
Michael J. Reidy	Republican	1991
