= 20th Guam Legislature =

The 20th Guam Legislature was a meeting of the Guam Legislature. It convened in Hagatna, Guam on January 2, 1989 and ended on January 7, 1991, during the 3rd and 4th years of Joseph F. Ada's 1st Gubernatorial Term.

In the 1988 Guamanian general election, the Democratic Party of Guam won a thirteen-to-eight (13-8) majority of seats in the Guam Legislature.

== Party summary ==
Affiliation	Party (shading indicates majority caucus)		Total
Affiliation	Democratic	Republican	Total
End of previous legislature	13	8	21
Begin	13	8	21
Latest Voting share	61.9%	38.1%	
Beginning of the next legislature	11	10	21

== Membership ==
Senator	Party	Assumed office
Madeleine Z. Bordallo	Democratic	1989
Edward Diego Reyes	Democratic	1989
John P. Aguon	Democratic	1989
Don Parkinson	Democratic	1983
Carl T.C. Gutierrez	Democratic	1989
Pilar C. Lujan	Democratic	1983
Elizabeth P. Arriola	Democratic	1983
Joe T. San Agustin	Democratic	1977
Ted S. Nelson	Democratic	1983
Herminia D. Dierking	Democratic	1985
Francisco R. Santos	Democratic	1971
Franklin J.A. Quitugua	Democratic	April 1977
Gordon Mailloux	Democratic	1989
Antonio R. Unpingco	Republican	1989
Thomas V.C. Tanaka	Republican	1989
Joseph G. Bamba, Jr.	Republican	1985
Doris Flores Brooks	Republican	1989
Martha C. Ruth	Republican	1987
Edward R. Duenas	Republican	1987
Ernesto M. Espaldon	Republican	1987
Marilyn D.A. Manibusan	Republican	1983
