= Dierking =

Dierking is a surname. Notable people with the surname include:

- Connie Dierking (1936–2013), American basketball player
- Herminia D. Dierking (1939–2008), Democratic Party of Guam politician in Guam
- Kirsten Dierking (born 1962), American poet
- Scott Dierking (born 1955), American football player
