= Guam Constitutional Convention of 1977 =

The Guam Constitutional Convention of 1977 was a constitutional convention that took place in Agana, Guam, in 1977.

== Authorization ==
Under the authority granted by the U.S. Congress under Public Law 94-584, Guam Senator Frank F. Blas introduced Bill 978, which would establish the Guam Constitutional Convention. The bill was substituted by the Committee on Rules and passed the Guam Legislature unanimously with 21 votes, and was enacted as Public Law 13-202 by Governor Ricardo J. Bordallo. The law provided for the election of delegates by municipality based upon population, as determined by the election commission. It provided for a referendum to approve the constitution following the convention.

== Delegates elected ==
A special election was held on April 16, 1977, at which delegates were elected to the Constitutional Convention. The following is a list of the delegates who were elected and from which municipal district each was elected.

Name	Municipal district
Martin C. Benavente	Dededo
Gregorio M. Borja	Santa Rita
Edward W. Chargualaf	Piti
Felix L. Crisostomo	Mangilao
Thomas Crisostomo	Talofofo
Francisco Cruz	Agat
Joseph C. Cruz	Barrigada
Vicente T. Diaz	Asan-Maina
Steve Eichner	Tamuning
Roque B. Eustaquio	Yona
T. Frank Flores	Yigo
Judith Guthertz	Mangilao
Carl T.C. Gutierrez	Agana Heights
Frank C. Guzman	Dededo
Anthony C. Leon Guerrero	Yona
Frank G. Lujan	Chalan Pago
Mark Martinez	Tamuning
Ernesto A. Natividad	Dededo
Theodore S. Nelson	Mongmong-Toto-Maite
Jesus L. Perez	Barrigada
Vicente P. Perez	Mongmong-Toto-Maite
Jesus S. Quinata	Umatac
Vicente C. Reyes	Sinajana
Jose B. Sarmiento	Santa Rita
Joseph F. Soriano	Dededo
Jesus M. Tedpahogo	Merizo
Jose Tuquero	Agat
James H. Underwood	Agana
Donald I. Weakley Sr.	Inarajan
Judith T. Won Pat	Sinajana
Antonio C. Yamashita	Tamuning
Prospero Zamora	Dededo

== Proceedings ==
The convention was convened on May 4, 1977, by Speaker Joseph F. Ada. Members of the Convention selected Carl T.C. Gutierrez to act as chairman of the convention. On December 15, 1977, the delegates signed the draft constitution.

== Referendum on the draft constitution ==
Following the approval of the draft constitution by President Jimmy Carter and the U.S. Congress, Senator Carmen A. Kasperbauer introduced Guam Public Law 15–23, which postponed the referendum on the draft Constitution until August 4, 1979. Eighty-two percent of those who voted in the 1979 referendum voted to reject the constitution.
