= Senator Underwood =

Senator Underwood may refer to:

- Jim Underwood (politician) (1946–2013), Guam Senate
- Joseph R. Underwood (1791–1876), U.S. Senator from Kentucky
- Levi Underwood (1821–1902), Vermont State Senate
- Nerissa Bretania Underwood (born 1955), Guam Senate
- Oscar Underwood (1862–1929), U.S. Senator from Alabama
- Thomas R. Underwood (1898–1956), U.S. Senator from Kentucky
- Warner Underwood (1808–1872), Kentucky State Senate
