= Marilyn D.A. Manibusan =

Guamanian politician

Marilyn Manibusan

Senator of the Guam Legislature
- In office January 3, 1983 – January 2, 1995

Personal details
- Political party: Republican
- Parents: Joaquin V.E. Manibusan, Sr., (1921-1999) (father); Alejandrina Atoigue Manibusan (died 2018) (mother)
- Occupation: Politician
- Known for: First chairwoman of the Republican Party of Guam.
- Other names: Marilyn Manibusan, Marilyn Dina Atoigue Manibusan

Marilyn Dina Atoigue Manibusan is a Guamanian politician. Manibusan is a former Republican senator in the Guam Legislature. Manibusan is the first chairwoman of the Republican Party of Guam.

== Early life ==
Marilyn Dina Atoigue Manibusan was born in Guam to Joaquin V.E. Manibusan, Sr., a traffic and small claims court judge, and Alejandrina Atoigue Manibusan (died 2018). Manibusan spent several years in San Francisco where she attended college and earned a paralegal certificate.

== Career ==
On November 2, 1982, Manibusan won the election and became a Republican senator in the Guam Legislature. Manibusan served her first term on January 3, 1983 in the 17th Guam Legislature. Manibusan served her second term on January 7, 1985 in the 18th Guam Legislature.

In 1986, Manibusan became the first chairwoman of the Republican Party of Guam.

Manibusan served her third term on January 5, 1987 in the 19th Guam Legislature. Manibusan served her fourth term on January 2, 1989 in the 20th Guam Legislature. Manibusan served her fifth term on January 7, 1991 in the 21st Guam Legislature. Manibusan served her sixth term on January 4, 1993 in the 22nd Guam Legislature, which ended on January 2, 1995.

Manibusan was chairwoman of the Guam Territorial Land Use Commission, which regulated land development.

In March 2003, Manibusan was found guilty of 22 charges, including extortion and bankruptcy fraud. In August 2003, Manibusan was sentenced by the federal court to 71-months in prison for accepting kickbacks from developers in exchange for approvals and funding. In September 2003, Manibusan began her prison sentence at Federal Correctional Institution in Dublin, California.
