= Franklin J. Gutierrez =

Guamanian politician

Vice Speaker of the Guam Legislature
- In office January 5, 1987 – January 2, 1989
- Preceded by: Joe T. San Agustin
- Succeeded by: Ted S. Nelson

Senator of the 17th, 18th, and 19th Guam Legislature
- In office January 3, 1983 – January 2, 1989

Personal details
- Born: November 13, 1948 (age 76); Agana, Guam
- Political party: Democratic Party of Guam

Franklin J. Gutierrez (born November 13, 1948) is a Guamanian Democratic politician who served senator in the legislature of Guam for 3 consecutive terms and also served as the vice speaker from 1987 to 1989.

== Early life ==
Gutierrez was born to Tomas Taitano Gutierrez and Rita Toves Benavente Cruz and was raised in Agana Heights. One of his ten siblings is former Governor Carl T.C. Gutierrez.

== Guam Legislature ==
Gutierrez first ran for senator in 1982. Placing 8th in the Democratic primary, he advanced to the general election. Gutierrez placed 9th in the general election, winning a seat in the 17th Guam Legislature. He was reelected to 2 terms.

=== Elections ===
Election Year	Guam Legislature	Primary Rank (Votes)	General Rank (Votes)	Result
1982	17th Guam Legislature	8 (7,122)	9 (14,307)	Elected
1984	18th Guam Legislature	13 (6,480)	14 (13,210)	Elected
1986	19th Guam Legislature	11 (8,192)	11 (16,073)	Elected
1988	20th Guam Legislature	15 (6,462)	27 (13,782)	Not elected
1990	21st Guam Legislature	15 (7,700)	27 (14,153)	Not elected
1992	22nd Guam Legislature	No primary election	27 (12,905)	Not elected

=== Leadership ===
Gutierrez served as Vice Speaker of the Guam Legislature from 1987-1989 during the 19th Guam Legislature.
