= Marcia K. Hartsock =

Democratic Party of Guam politician

Member of the Guam Legislature
- In office January 3, 1983 – January 7, 1985
- In office January 5, 1987 – January 2, 1989

Personal details
- Born: Marcia Ann Kingen Hartsock; March 30, 1941; Muncie, Indiana
- Died: November 4, 2012 (aged 71); Honokaa, Hawaii
- Political party: Democratic Party of Guam
- Children: 7

Marcia Ann Kingen Hartsock (March 30, 1941 – November 4, 2012) was an American politician in Guam and member of the Democratic Party. Hartsock served as Senator in the Guam Legislature for 2 terms.

== Early life ==
Marcia K. Hartsock was born on March 30, 1941, in Muncie, Indiana.

== Guam Federation of Teachers ==
Hartsock was hired as the executive director of the Guam Federation of Teachers in May 1979. She served under GFT President Conrad Stinson during the teachers strike, which started January 12, 1981. On February 7, Hartsock was involved in a GFT sit-in in the Guam Legislature and was among the 61 protesters arrested. Hartsock's term as executive director of GFT ended when she took office in the 17th Guam Legislature in January 1983.

== Guam Legislature ==
=== Elections ===
Hartsock ran as a Democratic candidate for the 17th Guam Legislature in 1982. She placed 20th in the primary election, advancing to the general election. In the general election, Hartsock secured a seat of the Guam Legislature by placing 12th. When she ran for reelection in 1984, she lost her seat, placing 22nd in the general election. Hartsock returned to the legislature for a final time in 1987, after having placed 18th in the general election. She was defeated in a subsequent reelection attempt in 1988, where she placed 22 in the general election.

Election	Guam Legislature	Primary Rank (Votes)	General Rank (Votes)	Result
1982	17th Guam Legislature	20 (5,891)	12 (13,699)	Elected
1984	18th Guam Legislature	12 (6,529)	22 (12,093)	Not elected
1986	19th Guam Legislature	9 (8,463)	18 (14,290)	Elected
1988	20th Guam Legislature	11 (6,818)	22 (12,234)	Not elected

=== Committee leadership ===
Hartsock served as Chairperson of the Committee on Education in the 19th Guam Legislature.

== Death ==
Marcia Hartsock died November 4, 2012 (aged 71).
