= Carlotta A. Leon Guerrero =

Guamanian journalist and politician

Senator of the Guam Legislature
- In office January 2, 1995 – January 2001

Personal details
- Born: 1955 (age 69–70); Omaha, Nebraska, U.S.
- Political party: Republican
- Occupation: Journalist, Politician, and Non-profit Executive Director
- Other names: Carlotta Leon Guerrero

Carlotta A. Leon Guerrero (born 1955) is a Guamanian journalist, politician, and non-profit executive director. Leon Guerrero is a former Republican senator in the Guam Legislature.

== Career ==
From 1984 to 1994, Leon Guerrero was a radio and television journalist in Guam and the Northern Mariana Islands.

In November 1994, Leon Guerrero won the election and became a Republican senator in the Guam Legislature. Leon Guerrero served her first term on January 2, 1995, in the 23rd Guam Legislature. Leon Guerrero served her second term in the 24th Guam Legislature. Leon Guerrero served her third term in the 25th Guam Legislature, until January 2001.

Leon Guerrero was a chief of staff for Dr. Michael W. Cruz, until 2010.

Leon Guerrero is known for the filing a lawsuit against President Clinton for failure to reimburse Guam, the CNMI and Hawaii for Compact Impact costs.

Leon Guerrero is a former President of Association of Pacific Island Legislatures.

Leon Guerrero is the executive director of the Ayuda Foundation, a nonprofit organization based in Guam that provides humanitarian aid such as medical, human services and developmental assistance to Micronesia.

In January 2019, under Governor Lou Leon Guerrero's administration in Guam, Leon Guerrero became the chief adviser on military and regional affairs, a newly created position.

In November 2020, with Patrick Lujan on National Guard deployment, Leon Guerrero was named Guam's acting state historic preservation officer.
