= 19th Guam Legislature =

The 19th Guam Legislature was a meeting of the Guam Legislature. It convened in Hagatna, Guam on January 5, 1987 and ended on January 2, 1989, during the 1st and 2nd years of Joseph F. Ada's 1st Gubernatorial Term.

In the 1986 Guamanian general election, the Democratic Party of Guam won a thirteen-to-eight (13-8) majority of seats in the Guam Legislature.

Senator John F. Quan died in office on June 26, 1988. He was posthumously honored by the establishment of the John F. Quan Memorial Scholarships in Oceanic Research by Guam Public Law 19-37.

== Party summary ==
Affiliation	Party (shading indicates majority caucus)		Total
Affiliation	Democratic	Republican	Total
End of previous legislature	11	10	21
Begin	13	8	21
Latest Voting share	61.9%	38.1%	
Beginning of the next legislature	13	8	21

== Membership ==
Senator	Party	Assumed office
Don Parkinson	Democratic	1983
Elizabeth P. Arriola	Democratic	1983
Ted S. Nelson	Democratic	1983
Pilar C. Lujan	Democratic	1983
Joe T. San Agustin	Democratic	1977
Franklin J. Gutierrez	Democratic	1983
Herminia D. Dierking	Democratic	1985
Franklin J.A. Quitugua	Democratic	1977
A.J. "Sonny" Shelton	Democratic	1987
Francisco R. Santos	Democratic	1971
Pedro C. Sanchez	Democratic	1987
Marcia K. Hartsock	Democratic	1987
John F. Quan	Democratic	1987
Marilyn D.A. Manibusan	Republican	1983
Joseph G. Bamba, Jr.	Republican	1985
Alberto C. Lamorena, III	Republican	1979
Edward R. Duenas	Republican	1975
Ernesto M. Espaldon	Republican	1987
James G. Miles	Republican	1985
Jerry M. Rivera	Republican	1985
Martha C. Ruth	Republican	1987
