= Kasperbauer =

Kasperbauer is a surname. Notable people with the surname include:

- Carmen A. Kasperbauer, Guamanian politician
- Kyle Kasperbauer, member of the 2007 United States men's national American football team
- Lawrence F. Kasperbauer, Guamanian politician, member of 27th Guam Legislature and 28th Guam Legislature
- Travis Kasperbauer, former member of American hard rock band Brainerd (band)
