= Carmen A. Kasperbauer =

Guamanian nurse and politician (1935–2025)

Senator of the Guam Legislature
- In office January 1979 – January 1983

Personal details
- Born: 1935 Guam
- Died: December 24, 2025 (aged 90)
- Party: Republican
- Spouse: Larry Kasperbauer
- Parents: Antonio C. Artero (father); Josefa T. Artero (mother)
- Occupation: Nurse, politician
- Other names: Carmen Kasperbauer, Carmen Artero Kasperbauer

Carmen Artero Kasperbauer (1935 – 24 December 2025) was a Guamanian nurse and politician who was a Republican senator in the Guam Legislature.

== Early life ==
In 1935, Kasperbauer was born in Guam as a Chamorro. Kasperbauer's father was Antonio C. Artero (1905-1984). Kasperbauer's mother was Josefa T. Artero. In 1940, Kasperbauer lived in Agana, Guam. During the Japanese occupancy of Guam, Kasperbauer's parents were known for hiding George Tweed on their property in Guam for about 21 months. When she was aged nine, in July 1944, during the Battle of Guam which ended the Japanese occupation of Guam, her neighbour Juan Pangelinan was arrested and executed by Japanese soldiers for hosting an American fugitive. She has said "I threw away my rosary ... God must have forsaken us".

== Career ==
Kasperbauer was a retired registered nurse.

In November 1978, Kasperbauer won the election and became a Republican senator in the Guam Legislature. Kasperbauer served her first term in January 1979 in the 15th Guam Legislature. In November 1980, as an incumbent, Kasperbauer won the election and continued serving as a senator. Kasperbauer served her second term in January 1981 in the 16th Guam Legislature. In November 1982, as an incumbent, Kasperbauer lost the election with insufficient number of votes.

== Personal life and death ==
Kasperbauer's husband was Larry Kasperbauer. Their family lived in Dededo, Guam. Carmen A. Kasperbauer died on December 24, 2025, at the age of 90.

== Filmography ==
- 2004 An Island Invaded, a documentary directed by Esther Figueroa, Jim Bannan.
