= Hope A. Cristobal =

Guamanian politician and museum director

Senator of the Guam Legislature
- In office January 2, 1995 – January 6, 1997

Personal details
- Born: Hope Alvarez; December 14, 1946 (age 79)
- Spouse: Enrico Andrian Castro Cristobal
- Education: University of Guam, University of Oregon
- Occupation: Educator, Activist, Politician, Farmer, Museum director.
- Other names: H.A. Cristobal, Hope Cristobal, Hope Alvarez Cristobal

Hope Alvarez Cristobal (born December 14, 1946) is a Guamanian educator, activist, politician, farmer, and museum director. Cristobal is a former Democratic senator in the Guam Legislature. Cristobal is known for advocating for indigenous rights of the Chamorro people.

== Education ==
Cristobal earned a Bachelor of Arts degree with honors in Secondary Education (General Science) from University of Guam. Cristobal earned a Master's degree in Education from University of Guam. Cristobal completed Doctoral classes at the University of Oregon in Eugene, Oregon.

== Career ==
Cristobal is a farmer and an educator.

In November 1994, Cristobal won the election and became a Democratic senator in the Guam Legislature. Cristobal served her first term on January 2, 1995 in the 23rd Guam Legislature. Cristobal was an activist who advocated for indigenous rights of the Chamorro people. Cristobal is known for sponsoring a Public Law 23-130, An Act to create the Commission on decolonization for the implementation and exercise of Chamorro self-determination. Cristobal is also known for a bill that established the Chamorro registry.

Cristobal is a history instructor at the University of Guam.

In 2017, a commission for the native Chamorro language has been re-established on Guam. Cristobal became a chairwoman of Chamorro Language Commission. Cristobal also became an instructor of history and culture of the Indigenous People of Guam.

Cristobal is a representative for Guam Coalition for Peace and Justice.

Cristobal is a museum director in Guam.

== Filmography ==
- 2010 The Insular Empire.

== Awards ==
- 2011 Public Citizen of the Year. Presented by National Association of Social Workers, Guam Chapter.
- 2017 Proclamation for her decades of service at the Guam Congress. Presented by Guam Legislature.

== Personal life ==
Cristobal lives in Tamuning, Guam.
