= Martha C. Ruth =

Guamanian politician

Senator of the Guam Legislature
- In office January 5, 1987 – January 4, 1993

Personal details
- Political party: Republican
- Occupation: Politician
- Other names: Martha Ruth, Martha Cruz Ruth

Martha C. Ruth is a Guamanian politician. Ruth is a former Republican senator in the Guam Legislature.

== Career ==
In November 1986, Ruth won the election and became a Republican senator in the Guam Legislature. Ruth served her first term on January 5, 1987, in the 19th Guam Legislature. In November 1988, as an incumbent, Ruth won the election and continued serving as a senator. Ruth served her second term on January 2, 1989, in the 20th Guam Legislature. In November 1990, as an incumbent, Ruth won the election and continued serving as a senator. Ruth served her third term on January 7, 1991, in the 21st Guam Legislature, until January 4, 1993.

At the federal level, in May 2004, Ruth was appointed by President George W. Bush as a member of the President's Advisory Commission on Asian Americans and Pacific Islanders. Ruth became a commissioner of the White House Initiative on Asian Americans and Pacific Islanders.

Before July 2010, Ruth became a member of Guam Election Commission. Ruth's term expired in January 2015. Ruth and Joe Mesa were succeeded by Jennifer Calvo-Quitugua and Michael Perez.
