= 1979 Guamanian referendum =

4 August 1979

Do you approve the proposed constitution for the Territory of Guam?
Yes	18.15%
No	81.85%

Do you approve of a law instituting the death penalty for a person convicted of first degree murder under aggravating circumstances?
Yes	46.61%
No	53.39%

A two-part referendum was held in Guam on 4 August 1979. A proposed new constitution was rejected by 82% of voters, whilst a law introducing the death penalty was rejected by 53% of voters. In August 1987 a referendum was held on another proposed constitution, with each chapter voted on separately. Two chapters (I and VII) were rejected by voters, resulting in a second referendum in November in which both were approved.

== Background ==
On 21 October 1976 the United States Congress had approved the establishment of Constitutional Councils for Guam and the United States Virgin Islands. In December 1976 the Guamanian Legislature decided to hold an election for the Council.

In 1978 US President Jimmy Carter approved the proposed 14-chapter constitution, and a referendum was scheduled for 7 November. However, following a dispute over the gubernatorial election, it was postponed until 1979.

== Results ==
Do you approve the proposed constitution for the Territory of Guam?

Choice	Votes	%
For	2,367	18.15
Against	10,671	81.85
Invalid/blank votes	118	–
Total	13,156	100
Registered voters/turnout	27,606	47.66
Source: Guam Election Commission

Do you approve of a law instituting the death penalty for a person convicted of first degree murder under aggravating circumstances?

Choice	Votes	%
For	6,002	46.61
Against	6,876	53.39
Invalid/blank votes	278	–
Total	13,156	100
Registered voters/turnout	27,606	47.66
Source: Guam Election Commission
