= Valentine Namio Sengebau =

Palauan poet

Valentine Namio Sengebau (c. 1941–2000) was a poet from Palau. He lived on the island of Saipan in the Northern Mariana Islands. There is a poetry competition with his name which is open to middle school and high school students, and aims to support young poets.

Sengebau wrote poems discussing the personal, political and cultural life in Micronesia. Following his death, an anthology of his work was published by the Northern Marianas Humanities Council.

His niece is the activist Siobhon McManus.

== Works ==
- "Microchild"
