= 1987 Guamanian constitutional referendums =

Guamanian ballot measures

Two constitutional referendums were held in Guam in 1987.

In the first on 8 August 1987, voters were asked to approve each chapter of the document individually. With a low turnout of 39%, all chapters were approved except for Chapter I on relations with the United States and Chapter VII on Chamorro relations and immigration.

Amended versions of the two rejected chapters were brought back for voters to approve on 7 November 1987. Both modified versions passed on the back of a much higher turnout of 58%.
