= Katherine B. Aguon =

Guamanian educator and politician

Senator of the Guam Legislature
- In office January 1977 – January 1979

Personal details
- Born: April 27, 1931 (age 95) Agana, Guam
- Party: Republican
- Education: Territorial College of Guam, University of Guam, University of San Francisco, University of California, Berkeley
- Other names: Katherine Aguon, Katherine Bordallo Aguon

Katherine Bordallo Aguon (born April 27, 1931) is a Guamanian educator and politician. Aguon is a former Republican senator in the Guam Legislature.

== Education ==
In 1958, Aguon earned an associate degree in elementary education from the Territorial College of Guam. In 1964, Aguon earned a bachelor's degree in secondary education with a minor in English from the University of Guam. In 1966, Aguon earned a master's degree in secondary education and administration from the University of San Francisco. In 1971, Aguon earned a doctoral degree in curriculum and instruction from University of California, Berkeley. Aguon became the first Chamorro woman to earn a PhD.

== Career ==
Aguon became a teacher in Guam's public schools. In 1972, Aguon became a director of education, until 1976.

In November 1976, Aguon won the election and became a Republican senator in the Guam Legislature. Aguon served her first term in January 1977 in the 14th Guam Legislature. Aguon was also the first woman vice speaker. In November 1978, as an incumbent, Aguon won the election and served her second term in the 15th Guam Legislature, until January 1979. During Aguon's second term, she was also the vice speaker.

Aguon became an administrator of the Division of Research, Publication and Training at Department of Chamorro Affairs in Guam. In September 2009, Aguon retired from Department of Chamorro Affairs.

== Awards ==
- 2009 Guahan Award. Presented by Acting Governor of Guam Mike Cruz.
