= Jim Underwood (politician) =

Guam politician (1946–2013)

Senator of the Guam Legislature
- In office January 6, 1975 – January 7, 1985

Personal details
- Born: James Holland Underwood II; May 4, 1946
- Died: July 24, 2013 (aged 67)
- Political party: Republican
- Spouse: Lagrimas Underwood
- Children: James III
- Education: University of Guam

James Holland Underwood II (May 4, 1946 – July 24, 2013) was a Guamanian politician. He served as a five-term senator in the 13th through the 17th Guam Legislatures.

== Biography ==
James Holland Underwood III was the son of former Sen. Raymond Ferdinand Underwood and Ana Eclavea Torres Underwood who owned and operated Marianas Sales and Tendan Nene in Hagåtña. He was married to Lagrimas "Alma" Underwood in 1988 and they have one son, James H. Underwood III. His immediate family also includes his sister, Rosemarie Underwood and her children, Ray and Shelly Gibson, Mana Silva-Taijeron, and his god-son Dave Silva III, and his step daughters, Lisa and Theresa Fisher and their children.

Underwood graduated from the University of Guam. He served in the Guam Legislature 1975–1984. He also served in the Guam Constitutional Convention of 1977 and in other Guam government departments. He died on July 24, 2013, at the age of 67.
