= Siobhon McManus =

Guam peace activist

Siobhon Rumurang McManus
- Citizenship: Guam, USA
- Occupations: Teacher, writer, activist

Siobhon Rumurang McManus is a Palauan-Chamorro teacher and peace activist based in Guam.

In 2017 she led opposition to the construction of a new missile defence system by the US government. When speaking about the 2017 protests against American militarism, McManus stated that it also enabled the indigenous people of Guam to be heard on a global stage. She also represented the group Prutehi Litekyan, who campaigned against construction of a defence facility on ancient burial grounds and limestone forest. She also has been outspoken about the fact that citizens of Guam do not have full voting rights United States elections.

In 2018 she contributed to the anthology Kinalamten Gi Pasifiku, which features writers who focus "on narratives of colonised Pasifika". Her uncle is the poet Valentine Sengebau.
