= Dan Ho =

Dan Ho (born in Guam) hosts a show on the Discovery Health Channel called the Dan Ho Show, which premiered in January 2007. Now airs on Fit TV

Dan Ho is the publisher and creator of Rescue magazine, named by both Library Journal and Folio as one of the top 10 new magazines of 2003, and has been called the "anti-Martha" by Time magazine and USA Today.

Author of the books, Rescue from House Gorgeous, and Rescue from Domestic Perfection: The Not-So Secrets of Balancing Life and Style.

As of 2018, Ho writes for the Guam Daily Post as columnist.

Dan Ho also runs a lifestyle and gardening account on Instagram @HoandGarden.
