= John F. Quan =

Guam politician

Senator of the Guam Legislature
- In office January 5, 1987 – June 26, 1988
- In office January 1, 1979 – January 7, 1985

Personal details
- Born: John Frank Quan; November 4, 1944
- Died: June 26, 1988 (aged 43)
- Party: Democratic Party of Guam
- Spouse: Veronica Santos Quan
- Children: 2
- Education: Marquette University (MA)

John F. Quan (November 4, 1944 – June 26, 1988) was a former Democratic Party of Guam politician in the United States unincorporated territory of Guam. Quan served as a senator in the Guam Legislature for four terms.

== Early life ==
Quan was born on November 4, 1944 to John C. and Manuela Cruz. He was the stepson and nephew of John’s brother Regino, whom Manuela married following John C.’s death. The family had roots in Piti and Sånta Rita-Sumai, where residents of Sumay were relocated following the village’s destruction in World War II and subsequent taking by the United States government to form part of Naval Base Guam.

== Education ==
Quan earned a Master of Arts degree from Marquette University in 1977.

== Career ==
Quan was commissioned as a 2nd Lieutenant of the United States Army Reserve and was eventually promoted to Captain.

Quan first successfully ran as a senator in the Guam Legislature in 1978 and was re-elected to two consecutive terms. He did not win a seat in the Guam Legislature when he ran in 1984, but returned following the 1986 general election, where he placed 21st.

=== Elections ===
Election Year	Guam Legislature	Primary Rank (Votes)	General (Votes)	Result
1978	15th Guam Legislature	4th Dist.: 3 (1,822)	4th Dist.: 4 (2,925)	Elected
1980	16th Guam Legislature	4th Dist.: 2 (1,393)	4th Dist.: 2 (3,050)	Elected
1982	17th Guam Legislature	13 (6,824)	17 (13,498)	Elected
1984	18th Guam Legislature	6 (7,038)	23 (11,970)	Not elected
1986	19th Guam Legislature	10 (8,387)	21 (13,958)	Elected

=== Accomplishments ===
Quan authored the 1987 public law which established the Guam Micronesia Island Fair.

== Personal life ==
Quan was married to Veronica Enverga Santos, the eldest daughter of two doctors from Makati, Philippines. They had met as students in Marquette University, and were married at Santuario de San Antonio in Forbes Park, Makati. Together, they had two sons: Jonathan R. Quan, a magistrate judge of the Superior Court of Guam and Captain in the Guam Army National Guard, and James F. Quan, a Brazilian jiu-jitsu black belt champion and instructor based in Texas.

Quan died in office on June 26, 1988, at the age of 43, and is buried at Our Lady of Peace Memorial Gardens in Yona, Guam. He was posthumously honored later that year with the establishment of the John F. Quan Memorial Scholarships in Oceanic Research by Guam Public Law 19-37.
