= Frank Blas =

Guamanian politician

5th Lieutenant Governor of Guam
- In office January 5, 1987 – January 2, 1995
- Governor: Joseph Franklin Ada
- Preceded by: Edward Diego Reyes
- Succeeded by: Madeleine Bordallo

Vice Speaker of the Guam Legislature
- In office January 5, 1981 – January 3, 1983
- Preceded by: Katherine B. Aguon
- Succeeded by: Franklin J. Gutierrez

Senator of the Guam Legislature
- In office January 6, 1975 – January 3, 1983
- In office January 7, 1985 – January 5, 1987

Personal details
- Born: Frank Flores Blas; March 20, 1941 Agana, Guam
- Died: August 1, 2016 (aged 75) New York City, United States
- Party: Republican
- Spouse(s): Lydia Calvo (m. 1960; died 1970) Ernestina "Tina" Tenorio (m. 1971)
- Children: 5; including Frank Jr.
- Education: College of Guam (A.A); University of Portland (B.B.A)
- Profession: Politician, businessman

Frank Flores Blas Sr. (March 20, 1941 – August 1, 2016) was a Guamanian politician, businessman and member of the Republican Party of Guam. Blas served as the fifth lieutenant governor of Guam from January 5, 1987 until January 2, 1995 for two consecutive terms under Governor Joseph Franklin Ada.

== Biography ==
=== Early life ===
Blas was born on March 20, 1941, in Agana, which is now known as Hagåtña, Guam to Vicente Cepeda Blas and Beatrice Leon Guerrero Flores. He attended Father Dueñas Memorial School in Guam, but graduated from St. Augustine High School in San Diego, California. He received an associate's degree from the College of Guam in 1962. Blas then graduated from the University of Portland with a Bachelor of Business Administration in 1965.

Blas and his first wife, Lydia Blas, who died in 1970, had two children, Frank Blas Jr., a politician, and Lynette. In 1971, Blas married his second wife, Tina. Frank and Tina Blas had three children: Paul Andre, Yvette Ignette, and Y'buena Antoinette.

=== Career ===
Blas initially worked in the private sector for the Mobil Petroleum Company of Guam from 1965 until 1969.

He then became the Director of the Department of Commerce of Guam from 1969 to 1972. Blas was elected to Legislature of Guam and served as a Senator in 13th, 14th, 15th, 16th and 18th Guam Legislatures from 1974 until 1984.

In 1976, Senator Frank Blas authored Public Law 13-202, which provided for the establishment of the Guam Constitutional Convention.

In 1982, Republican Senator Kurt Moylan teamed with running mate, Senator Frank Blas, to challenge incumbent Republican Governor Paul McDonald Calvo in the primary election. However, Governor Calvo and his new running mate, Peter F. Perez Jr., easily beat the Moylan-Blas ticket in the Republican primary by 12 percent of the vote. Governor Calvo ultimately lost to Democrat Ricardo Bordallo in the November 1982 general election.

On November 4, 1986, Joseph Franklin Ada and his chosen running mate, Frank Blas, were elected Governor and Lieutenant Governor of Guam. Ada defeated incumbent Governor Ricardo Bordallo by 2,581 votes (7.6%). Blas served as Lt. Governor under Ada for two consecutive terms from January 1987 until January 1995. Frank Blas described his main role as Lt. Governor as working as a liaison between the Ada administration and lawmakers in the Legislature in a 1990 interview.

Governor Joseph Ada was term limited in 1994 and could not seek a third term. Blas declared his candidacy for Governor and chose Simon Sanchez as his running mate. However, Blas and Sanchez lost the 1994 Republican gubernatorial primary election to Tommy Tanaka and his running mate, Doris Brooks. Tanaka was later defeated in 1994 gubernatorial election by Democrat Carl Gutierrez and his running mate for Lt. Governor, Madeleine Bordallo.

Blas left elected office in January 1995 when he retired as lieutenant governor after two terms. He owned and operated Frank Blas & Associates, an insurance brokerage firm headquartered in Barrigada, Guam. In 2003, Blas was appointed Chairman of the board of directors of the Antonio B. Won Pat Guam International Airport Authority, a government agency which operates the airport.

Frank Blas died on the evening of August 1, 2016, at the age of 75 in New York City, New York, United States.

Political offices
Preceded by Edward Diego Reyes	Lieutenant Governor of Guam; 1987–1995	Succeeded by Madeleine Bordallo
Party political offices
Preceded by Peter F. Perez	Republican nominee for Lieutenant Governor of Guam; 1986, 1990	Succeeded by Doris Flores Brooks
