= Kirsten Dierking =

American poet from Minnesota

Kirsten Dierking (born 1962) is an American poet from Minnesota. Common topics in her poetry include the healing aspects of nature, and feminist themes, with particular emphasis on the aftermath and recovery from sexual assault. Some of her more well known works include I Might Have Dreamed This, Sailing Lake Superior and Nuthatch.

== Career ==
Dierking was awarded a McKnight Artist Fellowship in 2010. She is the recipient of literary grants from the Jerome Foundation, the Minnesota State Arts Board and the Loft Literary Center. Her first book of poetry, One Red Eye, was published in 2001, and she is widely published in journals and anthologies. Her work has been heard numerous times on The Writer's Almanac with Garrison Keillor.

Dierking's published work includes articles on teaching. Her article From Whitehall Palace to Burger King: Teaching the Humanities, was chosen for the 2010 National Education Association's Excellence in the Academy Award in the Art of Teaching category. In 2009, she received the Building Bridges Award in Education from the Islamic Resource Group of Minnesota.

== Bibliography ==
Poetry

- One Red Eye (2001)
- Northern Oracle (2007)
- Tether (2013)

Articles

- From Whitehall Palace to Burger King: Teaching the Humanities', Thought & Action, p37-44 Fall 2010
- Survivors in the Classroom: A Dialogue About Sexual Assault between Laura Gray-Rosendale and Kirsten Dierking, Thought & Action, Fall 2014
