= Franklin Quitugua =

Guamanian politician (1933–2015)

Speaker of the Guam Legislature
- In office January 5, 1987 – January 2, 1989
- Preceded by: Carl T.C. Gutierrez
- Succeeded by: Joe T. San Agustin

Member of the Guam Legislature
- In office January 3, 1977 – January 7, 1991

Chairman of the Democratic Party of Guam
- In office 1979–1981
- Preceded by: Frank Q. Cruz
- Succeeded by: F. Philip Carbullido

Personal details
- Born: Franklin Joseph Arceo Quitugua; November 6, 1933 Guam, U.S.
- Died: February 26, 2015 (aged 81) Tamuning, Guam
- Party: Democratic Party of Guam
- Spouse: Julia Jane Siguenza Quitugua (dec.)
- Relations: Michael San Nicolas (grandson)
- Children: Clare Aglubat; Franklin Quitugua Jr. Eva San Nicolas; Mark Quitugua; Jacqueline Ronan
- Education: George Washington High School, Northern Arizona University, University of Oregon
- Occupation: Educator, Politician

Franklin Joseph Arceo Quitugua (November 6, 1933 – February 26, 2015) was a Guamanian politician who served as a Democratic senator in 7 Guam Legislatures and as Speaker of the 19th Guam Legislature. He is the son of Ignacio Perez Quitugua, who served in the 1st and the 9th Guam Legislatures, and the grandfather of Congressman Michael F.Q. San Nicolas who is the Guam Delegate to the U.S. House of Representatives.

== Early life and education ==
Franklin Joseph Arceo Quitugua, born in Guam on November 6, 1933, is the son of Ignacio Perez Quitugua, who served in the 1st and 9th Guam Legislatures, and Rosa Santos Arceo Quitugua. Franklin Quitugua was on island during the occupation of Guam by Japan and the liberation of Guam by American armed forces. He graduated from George Washington High School in 1952.

Franklin Quitugua attended Northern Arizona University, majoring in Business Education with a minor in English. He received a Bachelor of Science degree in education in 1956. Upon returning to Guam, Franklin worked as a secondary school teacher in George Washington High School. After five years, he returned to Northern Arizona University, where he received his Master of Arts in Secondary Education Administration in 1962. After returning to Guam, he was given the position as Principal of George Washington Junior High School, which was later renamed Agueda Johnston Middle School. Franklin Quitugua was appointed Administrative Assistant to the Director of Education in 1968, became deputy director of Education and was appointed Director of Education by Governor Manuel F.L. Guerrero in 1969 and retained in the position by Governor Carlos Camacho.

From 1972 to 1975, Mr. Quitugua attended graduate school at the University of Oregon and received his Ph.D. in Educational Administration with a minor emphasis in Curriculum and Instruction, Anthropology and Education. Dr. Franklin Quitugua continued to serve as Director of Education until he resigned from the position in 1976 to seek the position of Senator in the Guam Legislature.

== Guam Legislature ==
=== Elections ===
Election Year	Guam Legislature	Primary Placement	General Placement	Result
1976	14th Guam Legislature		9	Elected
1978	15th Guam Legislature	1 (3rd District)	2 (3rd District)	Elected
1980	16th Guam Legislature	3 (3rd District)	3 (3rd District)	Elected
1982	17th Guam Legislature	3	11	Elected
1984	18th Guam Legislature	7	21	Elected
1986	19th Guam Legislature	7	14	Elected
1988	20th Guam Legislature	12	20	Elected
1990	21st Guam Legislature	6	24	Not elected

== Leadership positions ==
- 19th Guam Legislature - Speaker

== Major legislative accomplishments ==
During his tenure as Senator in the Guam Legislature, Dr. Franklin Quitugua increased funding for educational facilities, including the University of Guam, authorized the creation of and expansion of schools, expanding facilities at the Guam Community College, lobbying the United States Congress for increased Compact Impact Aid funding, authorizing the teaching of the Chamorro language in the Department of Education, and enabling the creation of alternative educational programs in Guam's public schools.

== Retirement ==
After his final attempt to serve the people as Senator in the Guam Legislature, Dr. Quitugua served as Director of Education from 1991 to 1993. After retiring from the Department of Education, Dr. Quitugua served on the Board of Regents of the University of Guam.

Franklin Quitugua died on February 26, 2015, at Guam Memorial Hospital, accompanied by family members. On the day of his death, Speak Judith T.P. Won Pat issued a statement, which said:

Our island has lost a great public servant today. Speaker Quitugua contributed to the advancement of education on Guam both in his service as Director of Education and as a senator, who chaired the education committee and increased funding for educational facilities in our island’s public schools, the University of Guam and the Guam Community College. His legacy lives on through his children and grandchildren, who have also been called to public service, continuing his work both in the schools and the Legislature.

His viewing and funeral mass were held at the Duble Nombre de Maria Cathedral Church in Hagatna. He was interred at Guam Memorial Park, Leyang, Barrigada.

== See also ==
- Guam Legislature
- Democratic Party of Guam
- Michael F.Q. San Nicolas

Party political offices
Preceded by Frank Q. Cruz	Chairman of the Democratic Party of Guam; 1979–1981	Succeeded by F. Philip Carbullido
Political offices
Preceded by Carl T.C. Gutierrez	Speaker of the Guam Legislature; 1987-1989	Succeeded by Joe T. San Agustin
