= Joe T. San Agustin =

Guam politician (1930–2021)

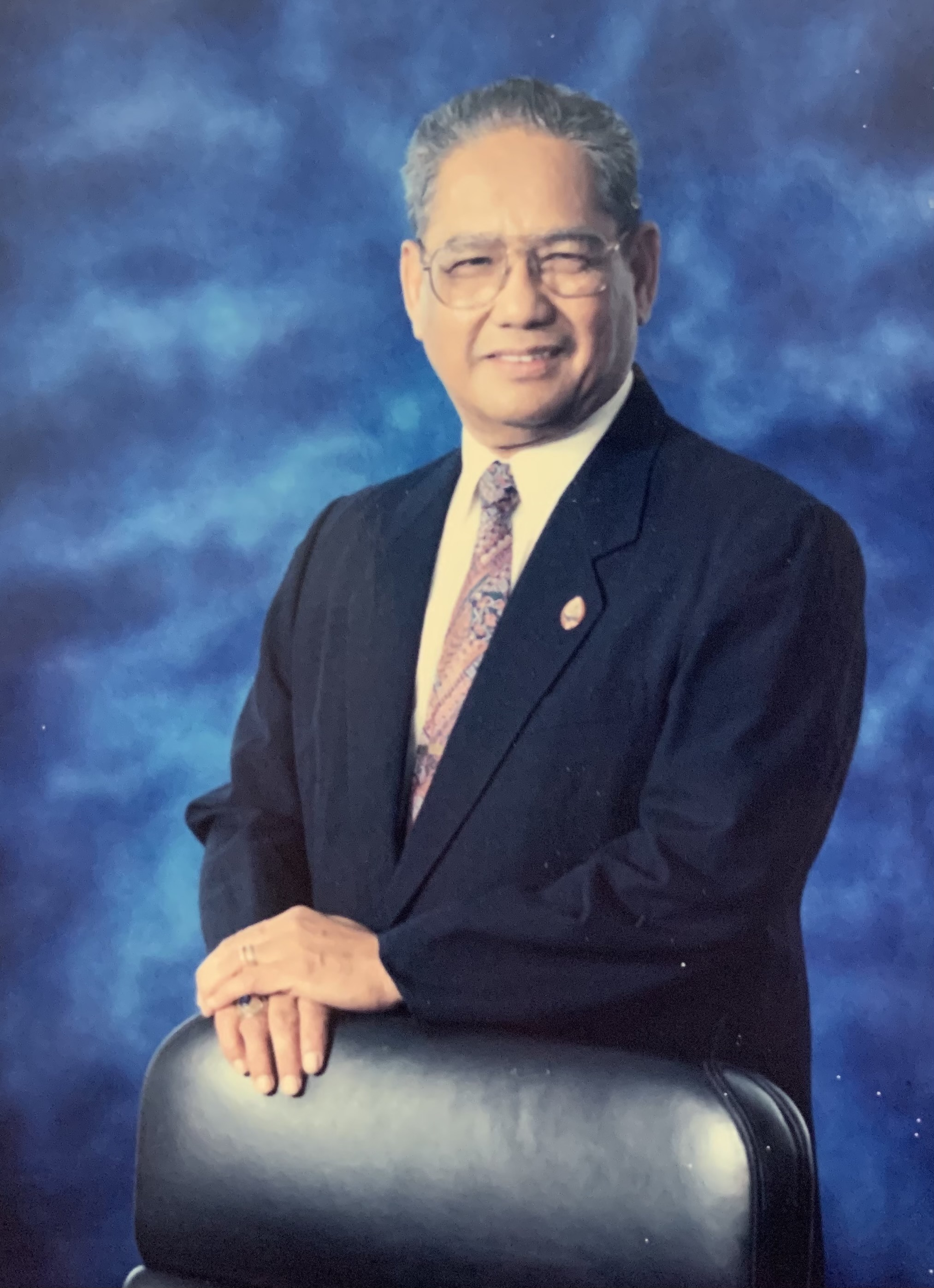

Speaker of the Guam Legislature
- In office January 2, 1989 – January 2, 1995
- Preceded by: Franklin J. Arceo Quitugua
- Succeeded by: Don Parkinson

Vice Speaker of the Guam Legislature
- In office January 3, 1983 – January 5, 1987
- Preceded by: Frank Blas
- Succeeded by: Franklin J. Gutierrez

Senator of the Guam Legislature
- In office January 3, 1977 – January 6, 1997
- Preceded by: Pilar C. Lujan
- Succeeded by: William B.S.M. Flores

Chairman of the Democratic Party of Guam
- In office 1997–2001

Personal details
- Born: Joe Taitano San Agustin; 15 October 1930 Agana, Guam
- Died: 15 April 2021 (aged 90) Guam
- Party: Democratic
- Spouse: Carmen Shimizu
- Children: 5, including Joe
- Education: Undergraduate and Graduate Degree at George Washington University, D.C.

Joe Taitano San Agustin (15 October 1930 – 15 April 2021) was a Guamanian politician, member of the Democratic Party of Guam. San Agustin served as Speaker in the 20th, 21st, and 22nd Guam Legislatures and Senator in the Guam Legislature for 10 consecutive terms.

== Early life ==
San Agustin was born on 15 October 1930 to Candido Sanchez San Agustin and Maria Pangelinan Taitano of Agana.

== Personal life ==
San Agustin was married to Carmen Santos Shimizu and they had five children, including their many grandchildren and great-grandchildren and great-great-grandchild. San Agustin's son Joe Shimizu San Agustin is a Senator from the 34th, 35th, and 36th Guam Legislature.

== Government of Guam and public service ==
- Chairman, Board of Trustees, Government of Guam Retirement Fund from 2004 to 2019;
- Executive Director of the Guam Base Reuse and Closure (BRAC);
- Director of Administration;
- Chairman, Board of Directors, Guam Power Authority;
- Acting Secretary of Guam during Governor Guerrero's term;
- Director, Bureau of Budget Management and Research, Government of Guam;
- Chief, Budget and Management Office, Government of Guam;

== Guam legislature ==
San Agustin first successfully ran as a senator in the Guam Legislature in 1976 and was re-elected 9 times thereafter. He served as Speaker of the Guam Legislature in 3 successive terms, from 1989 to 1995.

=== Elections ===
Election	Guam Legislature	Primary Placement	General Placement	Result
1976	14th Guam Legislature		16	Elected
1978	15th Guam Legislature	1 (1st District)	3 (1st District)	Elected
1980	16th Guam Legislature	1 (1st District)	1 (1st District)	Elected
1982	17th Guam Legislature	6	8	Elected
1984	18th Guam Legislature	4	7	Elected
1986	19th Guam Legislature	6	10	Elected
1988	20th Guam Legislature	4	13	Elected
1990	21st Guam Legislature	1	10	Elected
1992	22nd Guam Legislature	No primary election	11	Elected
1994	23rd Guam Legislature	13	11	Elected

=== Leadership roles ===
Guam Legislature	Term	Position
20th Guam Legislature	1989–1995	Speaker
21st Guam Legislature	1989–1995	Speaker
22nd Guam Legislature	1989–1995	Speaker

== Private sector ==
- Bank of Guam Board of Directors, 1972 to 2017;
- Organizer and First President, GovGuam Federal Credit Union now known as Coast 360;
- Chairman, Board of Directors, Guam Greyhound, Inc.
- Chairman, Board of Directors, Guam Aqua Research, Inc.

== Educational career ==
After retiring as a senator, San Agustin was an adjunct professor at the University of Guam for the School of Business and Public Administration up to 2019.

Party political offices
Preceded by Pilar C. Lujan	Chairman of the Democratic Party of Guam; 1997–2001	Succeeded by William B.S.M. Flores
