= 1984 Guam general election =

General elections were held in Guam on November 6, 1984 to elect the Legislature, the islands' delegate to the United States House of Representatives, Commissioners, Assistant Commissioners and the Territorial School Board. Voters also voted on three referendum questions. Primary elections had been held on September 1, 1984.

== Results ==
=== Legislature ===
Party	Votes	%	Seats
Republican Party	267,727	50.6	10
Democratic Party	261,604	49.4	11
Total	529,331	100	21
Source: Guam Election Commission

=== Delegate ===
Candidate	Party	Votes	%
Vicente T. Blaz	Republican Party	15,839	50.3
Antonio Borja Won Pat	Democratic Party	15,485	49.2
Invalid/blank votes		265	–
Total		31,733	100
Registered voters/turnout		38,952	81.47
Source: Guam Election Commission

=== Referendums ===
Three proposals were put to voters:

- Proposal A – an amendment to Title 12 of the Guam Code to limit the amount that the Guam Power Authority could raise prices by, as well as changing how prices increased and to reduce prices back to those of 1 February 1983.
- Proposal B – an amendment to Title 2 of the Guam Code to limit annual expenditure of the Legislature to £3m, reduce Senators salaries to $18,000 and the Speaker's salary to $19,500, make people personally responsible if they are responsible for breaking the cap and to reduce the number of sessions to 90 days during a two-year term.
- Proposal C – an amendment to Title 2 of the Government Code limiting gubernatorial spending to 95% of the actual government spending two years previously and diverting remaining government funds to the general fund and Guam Retired Fund deficits and liabilities.

Choice	For		Against		Invalid blank	Total	Registered voters	Turnout
Choice	Votes	%	Votes	%	Invalid blank	Total	Registered voters	Turnout
Proposal A	15,851	60.6	10,299	39.4	5,564	31,714	38,952	81.4
Proposal B	14,735	60.4	9,671	39.6	7,308	31,714	38,952	81.4
Proposal C	15,354	65.05	8,248	34.95	8,112	31,714	38,952	81.4
Source: Guam Election Commission
