= Francisco R. Santos =

American politician

Francisco R. "Frank" Santos

Vice Speaker of the Guam Legislature
- In office January 4, 1993 – August 9, 1993
- Preceded by: John P. Aguon
- Succeeded by: John P. Aguon

Member of the Guam Legislature
- In office January 4, 1971 – August 9, 1993
- Succeeded by: Francis E. Santos

Commissioner of Sinajana
- In office 1965–1968
- Preceded by: Luis C. Baza
- Succeeded by: Alfonso M. Pangelinan

Personal details
- Born: Francisco Rivera Santos; October 1, 1930 Guam
- Died: August 9, 1993 (aged 62) Los Angeles, California, U.S.
- Party: Democratic Party of Guam
- Spouse: Isabel Borja Santos
- Children: Priscilla Tenorio, Sarah Leon Guerrero, Francis E. Santos, Vera De Oro, Martin Santos
- Education: George Washington High School

Francisco "Frank" Rivera Santos (October 1, 1930 – August 9, 1993) was a Guamanian politician who recently serving in 12 consecutive Guam Legislatures. He previously served as commissioner of Sinajana from 1966 to 1968.

== Early life ==
Francisco Rivera Santos was born October 1, 1930, in Guam to Jesus Aflague Santos and Isabel Rivera Santos. He attended George Washington High School on Guam. He married Isabel B. Santos and they had five children.

== Guam Legislature ==
Francisco R. Santos ran as a Democrat for a seat the Guam Legislature in 1970 and placed 8th in the General Election, winning a seat in the 11th Guam Legislature. Following his first election, he was reelected 11 times and served until his death in 1993. His son, Francis E. Santos ran for and won his vacated seat.

=== Elections ===
Election Year	Guam Legislature	Primary Rank (Votes)	General Rank (Votes)	Result
1970	11th Guam Legislature	7 (5,936)	8 (10,305)	Elected
1972	12th Guam Legislature	9 (4,907)	18 (10,345)	Elected
1974	13th Guam Legislature	9 (5,761)	12 (10,861)	Elected
1976	14th Guam Legislature	Not available	17	Elected
1978	15th Guam Legislature	3rd District: 2	3rd District: 3	Elected
1980	16th Guam Legislature	3rd District: 1	3rd District: 2	Elected
1982	17th Guam Legislature	2	13	Elected
1984	18th Guam Legislature	9	11	Elected
1986	19th Guam Legislature	12	16	Elected
1988	20th Guam Legislature	13	18	Elected
1990	21st Guam Legislature	12	19	Elected
1992	22nd Guam Legislature	No primary election	19	Elected

=== Committee leadership ===
- 21st Guam Legislature - Chairman, Committee on Housing, Community Development, Federal and Foreign Affairs

== Death ==
Santos died on August 9, 1993, (age 62) in Los Angeles, California.
