= John P. Aguon =

Guamanian politician

Vice Speaker of the Guam Legislature
- In office August 9, 1993 – January 2, 1999
- Preceded by: Francisco R. Santos
- Succeeded by: Ted S. Nelson
- In office January 7, 1991 – January 4, 1993
- Preceded by: Ted S. Nelson
- Succeeded by: Francisco R. Santos

Member of the Guam Legislature
- In office January 2, 1989 – January 6, 1997
- In office January 3, 1983 – January 5, 1987

Personal details
- Born: John Perez Aguon
- Political party: Democratic Party of Guam

John Perez Aguon is a Guamanian former politician who served as Senator in the Guam Legislature for 6 terms. He is the member of Democratic Party of Guam.

== Political career ==
=== Guam Legislature ===
==== Elections ====
Election	Guam Legislature	Primary Rank (Votes)	General Rank (Votes)	Result
1982	17th Guam Legislature	10 (7,071)	16 (13,536)	Elected
1984	18th Guam Legislature	1 (7,417)	9 (14,585)	Elected
1988	20th Guam Legislature	3 (8,423)	7 (16,209)	Elected
1990	21st Guam Legislature	4 (9,826)	13 (17,536)	Elected
1992	22nd Guam Legislature	No primary election	10 (18,611)	Elected
1994	23rd Guam Legislature	5 (10,827)	16 (18,807)	Elected

==== Committee leadership ====
- Chairman, Committee on Rules, 18th Guam Legislature.
- Chairman, Committee on Tourism & Transportation, 20th, 21st, 22nd, and 23rd Guam Legislatures.
- Vice Speaker, 23rd Guam Legislature

=== Gutierrez-Aguon Gubernatorial Ticket (1986) ===
In 1986, Senator Carl T.C. Gutierrez teamed up with Senator Aguon to run for the Democratic nomination for Governor and Lieutenant Governor of Guam. The Gutierrez-Aguon ticket lost to incumbent Governor Ricardo J. Bordallo and incumbent Lieutenant Governor Edward Diego Reyes in the primary election.
