= Elizabeth P. Arriola =

Democratic Party of Guam politician

Elizabeth P. "Belle" Arriola

Member of the Guam Legislature
- In office January 3, 1983 – January 2, 1995

Personal details
- Born: Elizabeth Pangelinan Perez; November 19, 1928
- Died: June 26, 2002 (aged 73)
- Political party: Democratic Party of Guam
- Spouse: Joaquin C. Arriola
- Children: 8
- Education: George Washington Senior High school, BA from Rosemont College

Elizabeth Pangelinan Perez "Belle" Arriola (November 19, 1928 – June 26, 2002) was a Guamanian educator and a Democratic Party of Guam politician in Guam. Arriola served as Senator in the Guam Legislature for 6 consecutive terms, from 1983 to 1995, and was the wife of former Speaker in the Guam Legislature Joaquin C. Arriola.

== Early life ==
Elizabeth Arriola was born on November 19, 1928 to Vicente Borja and Maria Guerrero Pangelinan. Elizabeth grew up during the occupation of Guam by Japanese Imperial Forces during World War II and accompanied her mother and grandmother to Manenggon concentration camp toward the end of the occupation.

== Education and early career ==
Elizabeth graduated as salutatorian from George Washington Senior High School after the end of World War II. Elizabeth earned a Bachelor of Arts at Rosemont College and returned to Guam to teach in 1952.

== Guam Legislature ==
=== Elections ===
Arriola was first elected to the Guam Legislature in 1982 and remained in office 6 legislative terms.

Election	Guam Legislature	Primary Rank (Votes)	General Rank (Votes)	Result
1982	17th Guam Legislature	4 (7,377)	7 (14,436)	Elected
1984	18th Guam Legislature	2 (7,299)	14 (13,741)	Elected
1986	19th Guam Legislature	2 (10,504)	4 (17,710)	Elected
1988	20th Guam Legislature	9 (7,369)	11 (14,907)	Elected
1990	21st Guam Legislature	10 (9,098)	15 (16,969)	Elected
1992	22nd Guam Legislature	No primary election	18 (16,401)	Elected

=== Leadership ===
- Legislative Secretary, 17th Guam Legislature (1983-1985)
- Legislative Secretary, 18th Guam Legislature (1985-1987)

== Personal life ==
Arriola married attorney Joaquin C. Arriola, an attorney and later a senator in the Guam Legislature.

Arriola died following a stroke on June 26, 2002.
