= Herminia D. Dierking =

Democratic Party of Guam politician

Member of the Guam Legislature
- In office January 7, 1985 – January 2, 1995

Personal details
- Born: August 17, 1939; Agana, Guam
- Died: March 24, 2008 (aged 68); Tamuning, Guam
- Political party: Democratic Party of Guam
- Spouse: John C. Dierking
- Children: 5
- Education: Academy of Our Lady of Guam, BS in Business at the University of Guam, MBA at Emporia State University

Herminia Duenas Dierking (August 17, 1939 – March 24, 2008) was a Guamanian educator, a cabinet member of the Government of Guam, and a Democratic Party of Guam politician in Guam. Dierking served as Senator in the Guam Legislature for 5 consecutive terms, from 1985 to 1995,

== Early life ==
Herminia Duenas Dierking was born in Hagatna in 1939 to Jose Cruz Duenas and Maria Pangelinan Guzman. Herminia grew up during the occupation of Guam by Japanese Imperial Forces during World War II and accompanied her mother and grandmother to Manenggon concentration camp toward the end of the occupation.

== Education and career ==
Herminia graduated from Academy of Our Lady of Guam. Herminia earned a Bachelor of Arts in Business at University of Guam and a Master of Science in Business Administration from Emporia State University in Kansas. Herminia married John C. Dierking.

Herminia Dierking worked at the University of Guam for thirteen years, eventually becoming the Chairperson of the Accounting Department at the College of Business and Public Administration. In 1983 Dierking served as Director of the Bureau of Budget Management and Research and Chairperson of the Fiscal Policy Committee of the Government of Guam.

== Guam Legislature ==
=== Elections ===
Dierking was first elected to the Guam Legislature in 1984 and remained in office 5 legislative terms.

Election Year	Guam Legislature	Primary Placement	General Placement	Result
1984	18th Guam Legislature	15	19	Elected
1986	19th Guam Legislature	5	12	Elected
1988	20th Guam Legislature	8	17	Elected
1990	21st Guam Legislature	11	18	Elected
1992	22nd Guam Legislature	No primary election	17	Elected

== Leadership ==
- President, Association of Pacific Island Legislatures
- Chairwoman, Committee on Ways and Means, Guam Legislature
- Senator, Guam Legislature
- Chairperson, Accounting Department, College of Business and Public Administration, University of Guam
- Director, Bureau of Budget and Management Research
- Chairperson, Fiscal Policy Committee, Government of Guam
- President, Association of Government Accountants
- President, the Guam Business Education Association,
- President, Guam Business and Professional Women's Club

== Death ==
Dierking died on March 24, 2008.
