= Ted S. Nelson =

Guamanian politician (1935–2025)

Vice Speaker of the Guam Legislature
- In office January 2, 1989 – January 7, 1991
- Preceded by: Franklin J. Gutierrez
- Succeeded by: John P. Aguon

Member of the 22nd and 23rd Guam Legislature
- In office January 4, 1993 – January 6, 1997

Member of the 17th, 18th, 19th, 20th Guam Legislature
- In office January 3, 1983 – January 7, 1991

Personal details
- Born: Theodore Sgambelluri Nelson; May 17, 1935
- Died: February 10, 2025 (aged 89)
- Party: Democratic Party of Guam
- Spouse: Gloria Camacho Boria
- Relations: Telena Nelson (granddaughter)
- Children: 5
- Education: College of Guam (A.A.), Ohio State University (B.A.), University of New Mexico (M.A.)
- Profession: Politician, educator

Theodore Sgambelluri Nelson (May 17, 1935 – February 10, 2025) was a Guamanian politician. A member of the Democratic Party of Guam, Nelson served as Vice Speaker of Guam Legislature and senator in the Guam Legislature for 6 terms.

== Background ==
Nelson was born on May 17, 1935, to Peter Flores Torres Nelson and Laura Sgambelluri. Nelson graduated from George Washington High School. He earned an Associate of Arts degree from the College of Guam, a bachelor's degree from Ohio State University, and a master's degree from the University of New Mexico.

He taught physical education at George Washington High School. He served as vice principal of George Washington Junior High School and later John F. Kennedy High School. He served as principal at George Washington Junior and Senior High Schools. He served as a special assistant under Governor Camacho and Governor Bordallo.

Nelson was married to Gloria Camacho Borja and had four children and one adopted daughter.

He was the paternal grandfather of Senator Telena Cruz Nelson.

Ted S. Nelson died on February 10, 2025, at the age of 89.

== Arriola-Nelson Gubernatorial Ticket ==
In 1974, Joaquin C. "Kin" Arriola teamed up with Nelson in the Democratic Party of Guam Gubernatorial Primary. In the primary, Arriola-Nelson placed 4th against the teams of Ricardo Bordallo and Rudolph G. Sablan, Pedro C. Sanchez and Esteban U. Torres, and Manuel F.L. Guerrero and David D.L. Flores, with 1,254 votes.

== Guam Constitutional Convention 1977 ==
During the 1977 Guam Constitutional Convention, Nelson served as a delegate from Mongmong-Toto-Maite and secretary of the convention.

== Guam Legislature ==
=== Elections ===
Election Year	Guam Legislature	Primary Placement	General Placement	Result
1978	15th Guam Legislature	2 (2nd District)	9 (2nd District)	Not elected
1980	16th Guam Legislature	... (2nd District)	8 (2nd District)	Not elected
1982	17th Guam Legislature	5	5	Elected
1984	18th Guam Legislature	3	12	Elected
1986	19th Guam Legislature	3	5	Elected
1988	20th Guam Legislature	5	14	Elected
1990	21st Guam Legislature	2	22	Not elected
1992	22nd Guam Legislature	No primary election	21	Elected
1994	23rd Guam Legislature	7	14	Elected
1996	24th Guam Legislature	11	23	Not elected
1998	25th Guam Legislature	No primary election	18	Not elected
2000	26th Guam Legislature	No primary election	25	Not elected
2002	27th Guam Legislature	11	23	Not elected
2004	28th Guam Legislature	10	26	Not elected

=== Leadership roles ===
Nelson served as vice president of the Association of Pacific Island Legislatures from January 1, 1995, to December 31, 1996.

== See also ==
- Guam Legislature
- Democratic Party of Guam
