= Tony Blaz =

Guamanian politician

Anthony "Tony" Blaz

Vice Speaker in the 24th and 25th Guam Legislature
- In office January 6, 1997 – January 1, 2001
- Preceded by: Theodore S. Nelson
- Succeeded by: Lawrence F. Kasperbauer

Senator in the Guam Legislatures
- In office January 7, 1991 – January 1, 2001

Personal details
- Born: Anthony Crisostomo Blaz; September 22, 1958 Guam
- Died: January 30, 2016 (aged 57) Tamuning, Guam
- Resting place: Pigo Cemetery
- Party: Republican Party of Guam
- Children: Kimberly Ann; Maria Nicole; Joaquin; Kristina Bea
- Education: University of Notre Dame

Anthony Crisostomo Blaz (September 22, 1958 – January 30, 2016) was a Guamanian politician previously served a total of five terms as a Senator in the Guam Legislature and was chosen by his colleagues to serve as Vice Speaker of the 24th and 25th Guam Legislatures, respectively.

== Biography ==
=== Early life ===
Blaz was born and raised on Guam and he's the son of Joaquin Garrido Blaz and the late Brigida Lujan Crisostomo. He has 6 siblings including his brothers Joaquin C. Blaz, Matthew Blaz and his sisters Alicia Bethune, Amanda McHenry, Ann Marie Blaz and Monica Wintterle, also he is also the nephew of the late Congressman Vicente "Ben" Blaz. He graduated in 1976 from Father Dueñas Memorial High School in Mangilao, Guam. He received his bachelor's degree in business administration from the University of Notre Dame and his master's degree in public administration from the University of Guam. He worked in accounting and in energy conservation.

=== Career ===
Blaz served in the Guam Legislature. He served as director of the Guam Department of Administration.

== Notes ==
Political offices
Preceded by Theodore S. Nelson	Vice Speaker of the Guam Legislature; 1997–2001	Succeeded by Lawrence F. Kasperbauer
