= Don Parkinson (politician) =

American politician (1942–2020)

Speaker of the 23rd Guam Legislature
- In office January 2, 1995 – January 6, 1997
- Preceded by: Joe T. San Agustin
- Succeeded by: Antonio R. Unpingco

Majority Leader of the Guam Legislature
- In office January 2, 1989 – January 1, 1995

Member of the Guam Legislature
- In office January 3, 1983 – January 6, 1997

Personal details
- Born: William Don Parkinson; 1942 Idaho, U.S.
- Died: August 31, 2020 (aged 77–78) Philippines
- Party: Democratic
- Spouse: Marina Parkinson
- Children: 7; including William
- Education: J.D., University of Idaho

William Don Parkinson (1942 – August 31, 2020) was an American Veteran and Sergeant of the Vietnam war, politician, and lawyer who served as Speaker of the Guam Legislature from 1995 to 1997 and as Majority Leader from 1989 to 1995. A member of the Democratic Party of Guam, he also served as a Senator for 7 consecutive terms, from 1983 to 1997.

== Early life ==
Parkinson was born in 1942 in Idaho and served in the U.S. military during the Vietnam War. He graduated from the University of Idaho law school.

== Law practice ==
Parkinson was admitted to the State Bar of California on November 25, 1974, served as a staff attorney for the Micronesian Constitutional Convention of 1975, and as a prosecuting attorney for Colfax, Washington.

== Guam Legislature ==
=== Elections ===
Election	Guam Legislature	Primary Placement	General Placement	Result
1982	17th Guam Legislature	18	4	Elected
1984	18th Guam Legislature	10	8	Elected
1986	19th Guam Legislature	1	2	Elected
1988	20th Guam Legislature	6	8	Elected
1990	21st Guam Legislature	3	3	Elected
1992	22nd Guam Legislature	No primary election	15	Elected
1994	23rd Guam Legislature	4	7	Elected
1996	24th Guam Legislature	8	24	Not elected
2000	26th Guam Legislature	No primary election	26	Not elected
2004	28th Guam Legislature	20	N/A	Not elected
2006	29th Guam Legislature	10	24	Not elected

=== Leadership roles ===
Guam Legislature	Term	Position
20th Guam Legislature	1989-1991	Majority Leader
21st Guam Legislature	1991-1993	Majority Leader
22nd Guam Legislature	1993-1995	Majority Leader
23rd Guam Legislature	1995-1997	Speaker

Guam Legislature	Term	Position	Committee
19th Guam Legislature	1987-1989	Chairman	Committee on Energy, Utilities and Consumer Protection
20th Guam Legislature	1989-1991	Chairman	Committee on Energy, Utilities and Consumer Protection
21st Guam Legislature	1991-1993	Chairman	Committee on Energy, Utilities and Consumer Protection
22nd Guam Legislature	1993-1995	Chairman	Committee on Electrical Power and Consumer Protection
23rd Guam Legislature	1995-1997	Chairman	Committee on Electrical Power and Consumer Protection

=== Policy ===
==== Bills and public laws introduced ====
- 17th Guam Legislature - Introduced 16 bills, 2 of which became public laws. including Public Law 17-17, which established a 10 year alternative energy plan for Guam.
- 18th Guam Legislature - Introduced 21 bills, 1 of which became Public Law 18-26, which approved bond issues on behalf of 2 companies for the Guam Economic Development Authority and for which the Government of Guam disclaimed liability.
- 19th Guam Legislature - Introduced 6 public laws, including Public Law 19-31, which raised the minimum wage on Guam to $3.75 on January 1, 1989, and Public Law 19-41 that requires that food, drugs, and consumer commodities be marked with an expiration date if recommended by the manufacturer or distributor.
- 20th Guam Legislature - Introduced 73 bills, 15 of which became public laws, including Public Law 20-219 which provided a subsidy for essential power coverage.

==== Unemployment insurance ====
Parkinson introduced unemployment insurance legislation during each of 5 terms: Bill 929 during the 19th, Bill 285 during the 20th, Bill 101 during the 21st, Bill 123 during the 22nd, and Bill 99 during the 23rd Guam Legislatures, respectively.

=== Speaker of the 23rd Guam Legislature ===
It had been expected that Senator Thomas C. "Tom" Ada would be chosen by his colleagues as Speaker of the Guam Legislature, but a group of Democratic and Republican Senators elected Parkinson as Speaker, instead.

== Candidacy for Attorney General of Guam ==
Parkinson ran for Attorney General of Guam in 2002. He placed 3rd in the general election in November with 15% of the vote.

== Personal life and death ==
Don Parkinson married Marina Parkinson and was the father of 7 children. One of his children, William M. "Will" Parkinson, ran for the Guam Legislature and the Consolidated Commission on Utilities in 2018. William Parkinson was later elected as a senator to the 37th Guam Legislature.

Parkinson was diagnosed with Parkinson's disease in the late 1980s. He died in the Philippines on August 31, 2020.

Political offices
Preceded by Joe T. San Agustin	Speaker of the Guam Legislature; 1995–1997	Succeeded by Antonio "Tony" Unpingco
