= Tommy Tanaka =

Guamanian politician (born 1940)

Speaker of the Guam Legislature
- In office January 1, 1979 – January 3, 1983
- Preceded by: Joseph Franklin Ada
- Succeeded by: Carl Gutierrez

Personal details
- Born: August 7, 1940 (age 86) Guam, U.S.
- Party: Republican
- Spouse: Jane Tanaka
- Relatives: Carlos Camacho (uncle); Felix Camacho (cousin); Lenny Rapadas (nephew)

Thomas V. Camacho Tanaka (born August 7, 1940) is a Republican politician from Guam, previous Speaker of the territorial Senate from 1979 to 1983, and previous candidate for the position of Governor of Guam.

== Biography ==
He was born on August 7, 1940, to Tomas Santos Tanaka and Maria Josefina Garcia Camacho, and also the nephew of a former Governor of Guam Carlos Camacho.

Tanaka served as a Senator in the Guam Senate.

In June 1994, Tanaka ran for Governor of Guam along with his running mate is senator Doris Flores-Brooks, after two-term governor Joseph Ada was term-limited. Tanaka-Brooks won the primary election against outgoing Lieutenant Governor of Guam Frank Blas and senator Simon Sanchez II and winner will face Senator Carl T.C. Gutierrez and Senator Madeleine Bordallo, however during the election day, Tanaka lost the election for both Gutierrez and Bordallo. The election was contested, but the case was decided in favor of Gutierrez.

== Scandals ==
=== Gutierrez election ===
In 2003, Tanaka pleaded guilty to misprision of a felony as part of a political corruption probe by the Guam U.S. Attorney's Office in which Tanaka was accused of endorsing previously-rival Democratic candidate Gutierrez in 1997 in exchange for his construction firm receiving a large government contract to build school bus shelters a few months later. Judge William Alsup sentenced Tanaka to two years of supervised release, including six months of house arrest. In the trial, Air America Radio financier Evan Montvel Cohen testified against Tanaka.

Tanaka agreed to a plea agreement with the United States Attorneys Office in Guam; there was no trial for him.

=== Rapadas appointment ===
Tanaka was later implicated in allegations that he tried to influence the investigation that had been pursued against him by the U.S. Attorney's Office. In June, 2006, the USDOJ's Office of the Inspector General released their final report on their investigation into allegations made by previous interim U.S. Attorney for Guam Frederick Black that Tanaka's nephew Leonardo Rapadas replaced Black in his position as U.S. Attorney after Black called for an investigation into Washington-based lobbyist Jack Abramoff. Rapadas assumed the position after receiving President Bush's 2002 appointment. According to the investigation, "Black stated that he thought Tanaka had used his political influence to get Rapadas the nomination so that Tanaka's criminal matter would disappear." Rapadas was later recused from participation of any ongoing investigations of Tanaka. Black also claimed that Rapadas' nomination was intended to end his ongoing investigations into corruption by public officials in Guam. The OIG determined that Black's allegations were unsupported and that Rapadas' background investigation was sufficient and his appointment appropriate.

== Sources ==
- USDOJ Report of Investigation into Allegations Relating to the Selection of the U.S. Attorney for Guam and the Northern Mariana Islands
- Summary of Guam from 1998 CIA World Factbook
- FORMER GUAM OFFICIAL GETS 18-MONTH SENTENCE
- Air America Radio article, at about.com
- Government Briefs, Pacific Magazine

Political offices
Preceded by Joseph Franklin Ada	Speaker of the Guam Legislature; 1979–1983	Succeeded by Carl Gutierrez
Party political offices
Preceded by Joseph Franklin Ada	Republican nominee for Governor of Guam; 1994	Succeeded by Joseph Franklin Ada
