= Pilar C. Lujan =

Guam politician

Chairwoman of the Democratic Party of Guam
- In office 2008–2011
- Preceded by: Antonio Charfauros
- Succeeded by: Carl T.C. Gutierrez
- In office 1995–1997
- Preceded by: Mike Phillips
- Succeeded by: Joe T. San Agustin

Member of the Guam Legislature
- In office January 3, 1983 – January 2, 1995

Personal details
- Political party: Democratic Party of Guam
- Spouse: Frank G. Lujan

Pilar C. Lujan is a former Democratic Party of Guam politician in Guam. Lujan served as Senator in the Guam Legislature for 6 consecutive terms, from 1983 to 1995, and was the wife of former Senator in the Guam Legislature Frank G. Lujan.

== Private life ==
Pilar married attorney Frank G. Lujan, who would later serve in the Guam Legislature.

== Guam Legislature ==
=== Elections ===
Pilar was first elected to the Guam Legislature in 1982 and remained in office 6 legislative terms.

Election Year	Guam Legislature	Primary Placement	General Placement	Result
1982	17th Guam Legislature	12	21	Elected
1984	18th Guam Legislature	11	18	Elected
1986	19th Guam Legislature	4	6	Elected
1988	20th Guam Legislature	7	10	Elected
1990	21st Guam Legislature	7	16	Elected
1992	22nd Guam Legislature	No primary election	16	Elected

Party political offices
Preceded by Mike Phillips	Chairwoman of the Democratic Party of Guam; 1995–1997	Succeeded by Joe T. San Agustin
Party political offices
Preceded by Antonio Charfauros	Chairwoman of the Democratic Party of Guam; 2008–2011	Succeeded by Carl T.C. Gutierrez
