= Carl Gutierrez =

Governor of Guam from 1995 to 2003

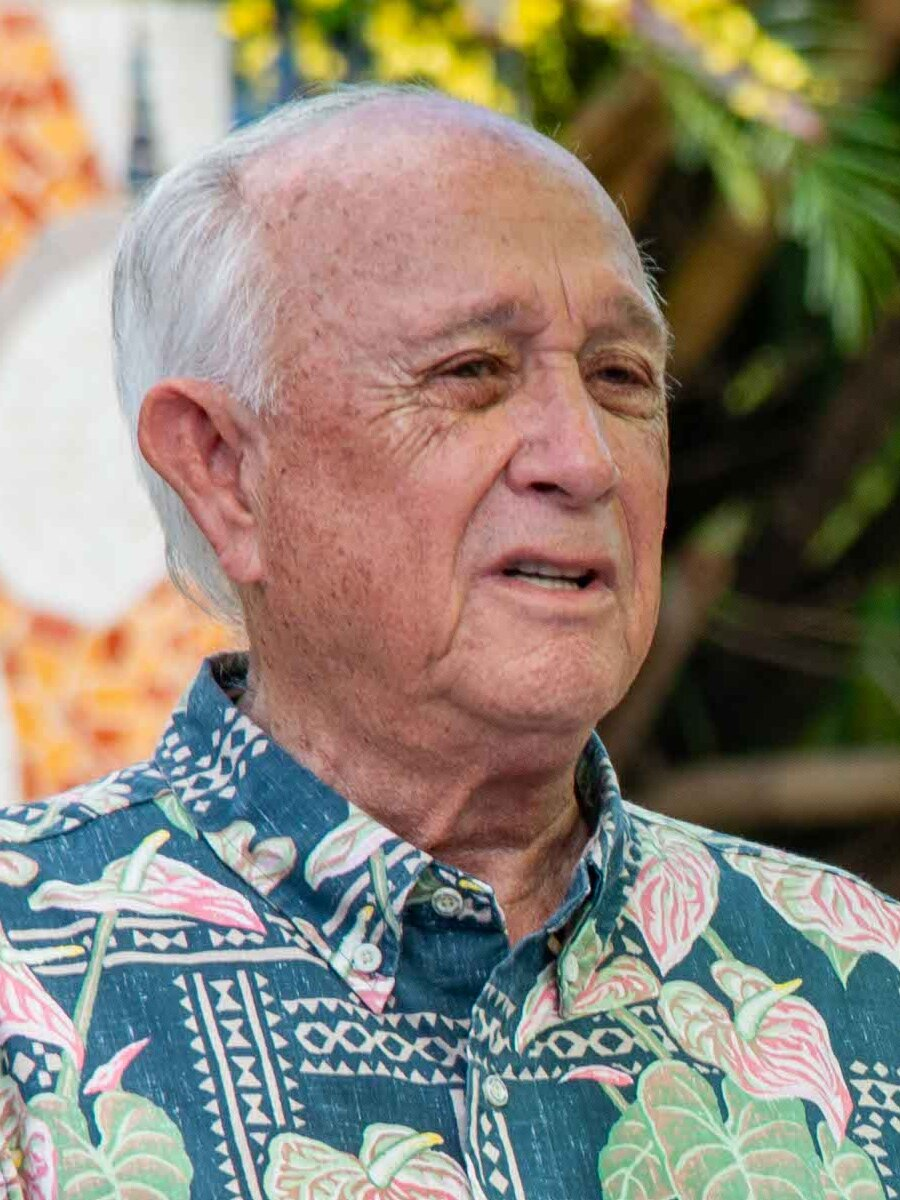
- Gutierrez at Manenggon Memorial 2024

Chair of the Guam Democratic Party
- In office 2011–2012
- Preceded by: Pilar C. Lujan
- Succeeded by: Darryl Taggerty

6th Governor of Guam
- In office January 2, 1995 – January 6, 2003
- Lieutenant: Madeleine Bordallo
- Preceded by: Joseph Franklin Ada
- Succeeded by: Felix Perez Camacho

Speaker of the Guam Legislature
- In office January 3, 1983 – January 5, 1987
- Preceded by: Tommy Tanaka
- Succeeded by: Franklin Quitugua

Member of the Guam Legislature
- In office January 2, 1989 – January 2, 1995
- In office January 5, 1981 – January 5, 1987
- In office January 1, 1973 – January 1, 1979

Personal details
- Born: Carl Tommy Cruz Gutierrez; October 15, 1941 (age 84) Agana Heights, Guam
- Party: Democratic
- Spouse: Geri T. Gutierrez (m. 1963)
- Children: 3

Military service
- Allegiance: United States
- Branch/service: United States Air Force
- Years of service: 1960–1965

Carl Tommy Cruz Gutierrez (born October 15, 1941) is an Guamanian politician who was the sixth governor of Guam, serving two four-year terms with Lieutenant Governor Madeleine Bordallo from January 2, 1995, to January 6, 2003. Gutierrez previously served a total of nine terms as a Senator in the Guam Legislature and was chosen by his colleagues to serve as Speaker of the 17th and 18th Guam Legislatures, respectively.

In addition to Governor Gutierrez' two successful elections as Governor with running mate Madeleine Bordallo, Governor Gutierrez ran unsuccessfully for governor in 1978, with running mate Dr. Joseph Dizon, in 1986 with Senator John P. Aguon, in 2006 with former Chief Justice Senator Benjamin J.F. Cruz and in 2010 with Senator Frank B. Aguon, Jr. Governor Gutierrez has remained active in public life for a period spanning four decades. He was again defeated in the 2014 gubernatorial election, in which his running mate was Gary Gumataotao.

== Early life ==
Born in Agaña Heights, Guam on October 15, 1941, Gutierrez was the fourth of eleven children born to Tomas Taitano Gutierrez and Rita Benavente Cruz. He is of Spanish and native Chamorro descent. As a young child during World War II, he endured the horrors of the Manenggon Concentration Camp, and alongside his mother and other captive Chamorros he was among those who were rescued by American soldiers during the liberation of Guam.

When Gutierrez was a boy his father (unable to work due to an injury suffered as a teenager) and his mother had a difficult time raising such a large family. Carl attended Agana Heights Elementary School and George Washington High School. When a friend (commander of the Navy drydock) offered to help Gutierrez finish high school on the U.S. mainland, Gutierrez took advantage of the opportunity. However, less than four months after leaving Guam, his father died. He graduated from South San Francisco High School in California in 1960.

Gutierrez enlisted in the U.S. Air Force on the day he graduated from high school. Explaining why he chose to join the U.S. Air Force, Carl Gutierrez later said, "For me, it was a means to get an education. After learning what I could in the computer field, I wanted to come home where my roots are." Stationed in New Mexico, following Typhoon Karen in November 1962, Gutierrez was assigned to Andersen Air Force Base, so he could help his mother and brothers and sisters in the aftermath of the typhoon.

Gutierrez married Geraldine Chance “Geri” Torres, on September 7, 1963, after a 6-month courtship. Gutierrez and Geri are practicing Roman Catholics, involved in many church organizations and activities. They have three children, Carla, Tommy & Hannah, and five grandchildren, Lily, Livia, Seth, Liam, & Emilia-Chance.

Following his tour in the Air Force from 1960 to 1965, Gutierrez entered into the business world, eventually forming CarlTom Construction Company. Gutierrez spent nearly eight years as a government of Guam data processing manager.

== Political career before the Gutierrez-Bordallo Administration ==
Carl Gutierrez became interested in the world of politics and assisted former Democratic senators Ricardo J. “Ricky” Bordallo and Richard F. Taitano in 1969 gearing up for the 1970 first election for the office of Governor of Guam. Eventually Ricky, Dick Taitano and sister Evelyn and others urged him to run for senator in the 1972 election. Gutierrez was elected in 1972.

=== Senator in the 12th, 13th, and 14th Guam Legislatures ===
Carl T.C. Gutierrez first ran for the Guam Legislature in 1972. Running in the Democratic primary, Gutierrez placed number 8 by votes received, with 4,925 votes. In the General Election, Carl Gutierrez rose to number 7 with 10,844 votes. Three future governors of Guam were included in the 12th Guam Legislature, which was sworn in on January 1, 1973, including Governor Gutierrez, Paul M. Calvo and Joseph F. Ada.

He was selected by his colleagues to serve as Chairman of the Committee on Housing and Urban Development in the first of his nine terms as senator. During his first term, Carl Gutierrez authored the GHURA 500 Low and Moderate Income Housing Law, which used five parcels of government land in Dededo and Yigo to build 500 homes, and established the Guam Youth Congress.

Senator Carl Gutierrez sought reelection in 1974. In the Democratic primary, Gutierrez placed 3rd, receiving 6,278 votes. In the General Election, Gutierrez placed 10th with 11,028 votes.

=== Guam 1977 Constitutional Convention ===
His long history of public service also includes election as President of Guam's first federally-recognized Constitutional Convention and as the architect and father of computerization of the Government of Guam. In 1977, by authorization of Federal Law and Local Law, Gutierrez was elected to the First Constitutional Convention and was elected by his colleagues to preside as president. A constitution was drafted and approved by US President Jimmy Carter and the U.S. Congress but was later not ratified by Guam in a 1979 special election.

=== Gutierrez-Dizon Gubernatorial Ticket (1978) ===
In 1978, Carl Gutierrez ran for the office of governor as an independent, with Dr. Joseph Dizon, a Republican, as his running mate. In the primary, the ticket received 762 votes, insufficient to be included in the General Election.

Gutierrez served as advisor to Palau's Constitutional Convention in 1979 and was later made an honorary citizen of Palau by legislation. He co-sponsored legislation creating the APIL, association of Pacific Island legislatures. He was elected to three terms as their president.

=== Senator in the 16th, 17th, and 18th Guam Legislatures ===
In 1980, Gutierrez won a seat back and returned to the Legislature in 1981. He successfully unseated an incumbent Republican Senator in his district.

Four years after the senatorial districting plan for Guam was put in place in 1978, the courts ruled in early 1982 that it violated the principle of “one man, one vote”. As a result, the 1982 election was an "at-large" election and Gutierrez and the Democrats regained the Legislature gaining a super majority ( 14 of 21 seats ) and he was elected Speaker of the Legislature for two terms.

=== Gutierrez-Aguon Gubernatorial Ticket (1986) ===
In 1986, Gutierrez ran for Governor against incumbent Governor Ricardo J. Bordallo, the party icon who had encouraged Gutierrez to get into politics in the first place. Senator Gutierrez and Senator John P. Aguon lost to Governor Bordallo and Lt. Governor Eddie Reyes in the primary election.

=== Senator in the 20th, 21st, and 22nd Guam Legislatures ===
Gutierrez returned to the Legislature in 1989 and served three successive terms. Of his nine total terms, he served three as chairman of the powerful Committee on Ways and Means, and was twice elected by his colleagues to be Speaker of the Legislature. Other committee assignments included several terms as Vice Chairman of the Committee on Rules and the Committee on Tourism and Transportation. Gutierrez wrote or co-sponsored 270 Public Laws during his 18 years as senator.

=== Gutierrez-Bordallo Gubernatorial Ticket (1994) ===
In 1994, Carl Gutierrez teamed up with Senator Madeleine Bordallo, the widow of former Governor Ricardo Jerome Bordallo, to run for the island's highest office once more on a platform of “Helping the People of Guam.” In the primary, they were challenged by the Democratic team of Edward D. Reyes and Gloria B. Nelson. The Gutierrez-Bordallo team received 9,555 votes while the Reyes-Nelson team received only 6,450 votes. In the 1994 General Election, the Democratic team of Gutierrez-Bordallo faced the Republican team of Thomas V.C. Tanaka and Doris Flores Brooks. During the General Election, Tanaka-Brooks outspent the Gutierrez-Bordallo team by over $100,000, but Carl Gutierrez and Madeleine Bordallo won the election in a landslide with 23,405 votes, while Tanaka-Brooks had 19,281.

== Governor of Guam (1995–2003) ==
=== First Gutierrez-Bordallo Administration ===
Upon assuming office on January 2, 1995, Governor Carl T.C. Gutierrez focused his work in the areas of infrastructure so that all the marginalized people will be brought into the 20th century before it went out and also pushing for economic development by aggressively completing 85% of his Vision 2001 plan by the end of 1999. Despite a super majority Republican Legislature that opposed virtually every executive initiative, the Gutierrez-Bordallo administration was successful in guiding the island through the rough waters of economic downturns throughout the region.

The tourism economy was also severely affected by the crash of Korean Air Flight 801 on August 6, 1997. During the rescue efforts, Gutierrez was one of the first responders and the first to reach the burning plane along with Dep. Fire Chief Chuck Sanchez and his security police officer Cecil Sulla. Gutierrez was credited with saving several lives, including 11-year-old Rika Matsuda and Barry Small, an injured helicopter mechanic from New Zealand, who called Governor Gutierrez a "Hero." Gutierrez received the Eagle Award, the highest award given to a civilian by the U.S. National Guard Bureau. He was recognized by the governments of Japan and the Republic of Korea.

In December 1997, Typhoon Paka struck Guam. The strong winds from Paka left around 1,500 buildings destroyed on the island, of which 1,160 were single-family homes. A further 10,000 buildings sustained damage to some degree, with 60% of the homes on the island reporting major damage. In all, about 5,000 people were left homeless due to the typhoon. Additionally, an estimated 30–40% of the public buildings received major damage. Buildings on the island made of reinforced concrete fared well, as opposed to light metal-frame structures, which more often were completely destroyed. Large tourist hotels near Hagåtña, on which Guam is dependent, received generally minor damage, such as broken windows and damaged power generators.

A complete island-wide power outage followed the typhoon; damage to the main electrical transmission and distribution system was estimated at USD16 million. Following the passage of the typhoon, 25% of the homes on Guam were left without water. Telephone service remained working after the storm, due to most lines being underground. Strong waves washed away a few coastal roads in the northern portion of the island, leaving them temporarily closed. The waves surpassed the seawall at Apra Harbor, damaging the road and infrastructure of the seaport; many boats were washed ashore after breaking from their moorings. Strong winds damaged a radar system and lights along the runway of the Antonio B. Won Pat International Airport, though most airport facilities received light damage. The Andersen Air Force Base also sustained heavy damage, with hundreds of downed trees and many facilities left damaged. Across Guam, damage was estimated at USD500 million. About 100 people were injured, but the typhoon caused no deaths on the island.

In 1998, Governor Carl Gutierrez ran for reelection with Lieutenant Governor Madeleine Z. Bordallo. There were two Democratic teams that challenged the Gutierrez-Bordallo team in the primary. Senator Thomas C. Ada and Senator Lou A. Leon Guerrero ran as a team, as did Senator Angel L.G. Santos and Jose "Pedo" T. Terlaje. The Gutierrez-Bordallo carried the 1998 Democratic primary with 16,838 votes, compared with only 9,788 for Ada-Leon Guerrero and 6,295 for Santos-Terlaje. In the 1998 General Election, Gutierrez-Bordallo faced the Republican team of Former Governor Joseph Franklin Ada and Senator Felix Perez Camacho. The election resulted in a second term for Governor Carl T.C. Gutierrez and Lieutenant Governor Madeleine Z. Bordallo, who won with 24,250 votes, compared with 21,200 votes for Ada-Camacho. In the 1998 Gubernatorial election against former governor Joe Ada, an election challenge by Ada/Camacho went all the way to the U.S. Supreme Court. The decision by the Supreme court was 9–0 in favor of Gutierrez/Bordallo, thus ending the Republican challenge.

Just following the reelection of Governor Carl T.C. Gutierrez and Madeleine Z. Bordallo, President William Jefferson Clinton visited Guam on November 23, 1998. The visit was the first since 1986 when a sitting U.S. president had visited Guam. Thousands of Guamanians gathered on the field in front of the Ricardo J. Bordallo Governor's Complex to see President Clinton. The crowd was treated to a rousing rendition of the Star Spangled Banner by Joseph "Uncle Tote" Cunningham and several speakers addressed the assembled crowd. President Clinton was introduced by youth speaker Michael San Nicolas.

=== Second Gutierrez-Bordallo Administration ===
Gutierrez/Bordallo

Gutierrez's credibility and integrity have been under constant attack by those who oppose him and his style of leadership. Beginning when he was still in office, efforts are continuing to try to find him guilty of purported crimes. He has never been found guilty of any crime, winning all cases that went to trial. Other cases were thrown out of court because they had no merit.

His second term in office was marked by political instability caused by the 1998 election challenges, a super majority Republican (12-3) Guam Legislature, an unsuccessful Recall Movement in 2000 after the Supreme court decision came out giving Gutierrez/Bordallo the win, the "rolling" power outages left behind by the Ada/Blas administration, the destruction of the island's infrastructure by Supertyphoons Chata'an, Paka, and Pongsona.

== Public life after the Gutierrez-Bordallo Administration (2003–present) ==
=== Gutierrez-Cruz Gubernatorial Ticket (2006) ===
Former Governor Carl T.C. Gutierrez ran with Senator and former Superior Court of Guam Chief Justice Benjamin Cruz to be the Democratic Party candidate for governor in 2006. The Gutierrez-Cruz team faced former Guam Delegate Robert A. Underwood and Senator Frank Aguon, Jr. Despite Underwood-Aguon spending 19.4% more on the campaign, they received only 13.6% more votes than Gutierrez-Cruz.

In November, 2006, Governor Gutierrez was awarded the Gusi Peace Prize for political achievement in the Republic of the Philippines by president Gloria Macapagal Arroyo. Among the other recipients was former Philippine President Fidel V. Ramos. He was also bestowed an Honorary Doctor of Law by the University of Guam.

=== Gutierrez-Aguon Gubernatorial Ticket (2010) ===
Gutierrez ran for governor again in the 2010 Guam election with Senator Frank Blas Aguon Jr. They ran unopposed in the Democratic primary, but were defeated in the general election by 487 votes by the current Governor Eddie Baza Calvo. Although a recount was ordered, the results stood. Gutierrez would go on to sue to challenge the recount. In February 2012 his running mate Frank Aguon asked to remove himself from the election lawsuit. In early April 2012, former Governor Carl Guiterrez announced that he would not run for congress representing Guam. This was a result of Congresswoman Madeleine Bordallo following through with her commitment to ask U.S. Attorney General Eric Holder and Guam U.S. Attorney Alicia Limtiaco to investigate the irregularities that were found by the Guam Election Commission in the 2010 general election.

=== Gutierrez-Gumataotao Gubernatorial Ticket (2014) ===
On June 2, 2014, a number of supporters picked up a packet nominating former governor Carl Gutierrez to run with attorney Gary Gumataotao for governor and lieutenant governor. At a packed meeting of the Central Executive Committee meeting of the Democratic Party of Guam, Governor Gutierrez announced his intention to run with Gumataotao for governor. At the event, Governor Gutierrez said, "The island needs change; the people are suffering. We need people and leadership that care for all the people." On November 4, Gutierrez was again defeated by the incumbent governor, Eddie Baza Calvo.

=== Gutierrez-Bordallo Gubernatorial Ticket (2018) ===
In January 2018, former Governor Carl T.C. Gutierrez officially announced his bid to once again be the Governor of Guam, after losing the past 2 elections against the Republican Calvo-Tenorio administration. Gutierrez selected former Guam Police Department chief Fred Bordallo as his running mate for the upcoming Democratic primaries. Gutierrez and Bordallo will face 3 other Democratic tickets to gain the party's nomination: Aguon/Limtiaco ticket, Leon Guerrero/Tenorio ticket and Rodriguez/Cruz ticket. In the August primary, Gutierrez and Bordallo were defeated by the ticket of Lou Leon Guerrero and Josh Tenorio, then later Gutierrez endorsed her for general election.

=== Sexual harassment and assault allegations (2026) ===
In June 2026, a former Guam Visitors Bureau (GVB) employee, identified in court filings as Jane Doe, filed a $61.5 million civil lawsuit in the U.S. District Court of Guam against the GVB and its board chairman, George Chiu. The complaint alleged that Gutierrez, while serving as president and general manager of the bureau, repeatedly sexually harassed and sexually assaulted the employee during official travel to Japan and Saipan and at the GVB offices between October 2022 and August 2024. Gutierrez was not named as a defendant in the lawsuit.

GVB stated that it had retained an independent investigator and had taken corrective action in response to the allegations. The allegations also prompted Guam Senator Therese Terlaje to call for an investigation into the conduct described in the lawsuit. Gutierrez did not respond to a request for comment reported by Public Radio Guam. As of June 11th, 2026, Guam Police Department records showed no sexual assault complaint was filed against Gutierrez dating from 2022 onward, and he had not been criminally charged in connection with the allegations. Later reporting described the matter as a $61.5 million civil lawsuit against GVB.

Political offices
Preceded by Tommy Tanaka	Speaker of the Guam Legislature; 1983–1987	Succeeded by Franklin Quitugua
Preceded by Joseph Franklin Ada	Governor of Guam; 1995–2003	Succeeded by Felix Perez Camacho
Party political offices
Preceded by Madeleine Bordallo	Democratic nominee for Governor of Guam; 1994, 1998	Succeeded by Robert Underwood
Preceded by Robert Underwood	Democratic nominee for Governor of Guam; 2010, 2014	Succeeded by Lou Leon Guerrero
Preceded by Pilar C. Lujan	Chair of the Guam Democratic Party; 2011–2012	Succeeded by Darryl Taggerty
