= Republican Party of Guam =

Guam affiliate of the Republican Party

- Chairperson: Juan Carlos Benitez
- Legislative Minority Leader: Christopher M. Duenas
- Minority Leader Whip: Frank Blas Jr.
- Founded: 1966
- Preceded by: Territorial Party
- Headquarters: P.O. Box 2846, Hagåtña, Guam 96932
- Ideology: Conservatism
- National affiliation: Republican Party
- Colors: Red
- U.S. House of Representatives: 1 / 1
- Territorial Legislature: 9 / 15
- Villages held by Republican Mayors: 9 / 19

Election symbol

Website
- www.gopguam.org

The Republican Party of Guam (Chamorro: Påttida Republikan Guåhan), commonly referred to as Guam GOP (abbreviation for Guam Grand Old Party), is a political party in Guam affiliated with the United States Republican Party.

In the 2024 general election, Republican Party candidates won 9 out of 15 seats in the Guam Legislature.

== History ==
The Republican Party of Guam stems from the old Territorial Party of Guam, which existed from 1956 through 1968. The Territorial Party was established in 1956 by discontented former Popular Party members, including Frank D. Perez, Pedro Leon Guerrero, Edward T. Calvo, Cynthia Torres, B. J. Bordallo, Vicente Reyes, Felix Carbullido, and Antonio Duenas. The Territorial Party had only one successful election, in 1964, when it won a majority in the Guam Legislature with 13 thirteen of the 21 twenty-one seats.

This changed during the 1966 election, when the Territorials lost all twenty-one seats to the Democrats. The Territorials' demise came after they blocked a popular urban renewal plan, which was supported by the Democrats, as the Territorials backed private investment. The Territorial Party dissolved soon after.

On November 21, 1966, a few weeks after the general election of that year, former Governor Joseph Flores, along with former Territorial senators Carlos Garcia Camacho, Kurt S. Moylan, and Vicente C. Reyes, officially formed the Republican Party of Guam. Other Territorials soon became active, including Senators G. Ricardo Salas and Frank D. Perez. The new Republicans were careful not to portray their new party as a criticism of the Territorial Party, whose members they hoped to attract.

== Republican governors of Guam ==
At the young age of forty-four, Carlos Camacho succeeded Governor Manuel F.L. Guerrero as Governor of Guam, with Kurt Moylan appointed as lieutenant governor. Camacho's term as appointed governor lasted only eighteen months, due to the Elective Governor Act that was signed into law by the US Congress in 1968, allowing for Guam's citizens to choose their governor. The act took effect in 1970 when Guam's first election was held. Camacho's term was best remembered for his Christmas 1969 visit to the troops from Guam who were fighting in Vietnam.

=== Camacho–Moylan administration ===
Camacho first selected senator G. Ricardo Salas as his running mate but later announced that Kurt Moylan would be the Republicans' candidate for lieutenant governor. The Democratic primary was a close race between former governor Manuel F. L. Guerrero, senator Ricardo Bordallo and attorney and former speaker Joaquin C. "Kin" Arriola. After a close primary and a contentious runoff election, Guerrero defeated Bordallo, and in the general election Camacho–Moylan defeated Bordallo–Taitano.

Camacho and Moylan's historic inauguration was held on January 4, 1971, at the Plaza de España in Agana. He uses the resources of the government to enhance economic opportunities by granting incentives through the Guam Economics Development and offering various forms of assistance to the private sector. During his entire five and a half years in office, Camacho presided over one of the largest eras of hotel construction activities on Guam, with construction finishing or starting on the Kakue Hotel, Reef Hotel, Hilton Hotel, Okura Hotel, Fujita Tumon Beach, Continental Travelodge, and Guam Dai Ichi Hotel.

Camacho also initiated massive road projects that were continued by his successors, including the widening of Marine Drive (now Marine Corps Drive) from Hospital Road north to Route 16 in Harmon, and the reconstruction of other major highways in the villages of Agat, Dededo, and Tamuning, among others.

He is also credited with enticing many educated Chamorros back to Guam, to reverse what was seen as a "brain drain" at the time, including Tony Palomo, Greg Sanchez, Mary Sanchez, Tony Unpingco, Dr. Pedro Sanchez, Dr. Katherine Aguon, Juan C. Tenorio, Bert Unpingco, Ben Perez, Eddie Duenas, Joseph F. Ada and Frank Blas. Many of them took jobs with the government of Guam as administrators and later became senators. Camacho also kept on other able administrators even if they were not of his party affiliation which served to stabilize the government.

As a team, Camacho and Moylan worked to develop economic opportunities by creating incentives to attract business and encourage local participation in business. At the time Guam elected its first governor the federal government still had control over much of the island's utilities and roads. They struggled to work toward gaining more self-government and self-determination.

In the 1974 gubernatorial election, Camacho withstood a primary challenge by Paul McDonald Calvo, but was defeated for reelection in a re-match with Senator Ricardo Bordallo, who won the election. An election challenge by the Bordallo–Sablan campaign went all the way to the U.S. Supreme Court. Following his unsuccessful bid for reelection as governor, Camacho resumed his career as a dentist.

=== Calvo-Ada administration ===
Calvo ran for governor again in 1978, this time with popular senator Joseph F. Ada. Calvo's image of a successful business executive resonated well with the voters as he ran on a "balance-the-budget" campaign and attacked the Bordallo administration for the huge jump in the budget deficit and high crime rate. Calvo built a strong political organization, complete with regional and village groups, and had the financial backing not only of Calvo's Enterprises but of supporters in the business community. Bordallo, meanwhile, was hurt as his running mate, Sablan, ran against him in the primary, and Calvo-Ada won the election with 52 percent of the votes.

During his first year as governor, Calvo reduced the government of Guam's deficit by $27 million, but the deficit continued to climb for the rest of his term due mainly to long-standing problems with tax collections.

Guam's economy began to regain health under Calvo's administration, as he sought to attract new businesses to Guam, including a tuna-fishing fleet, a garment manufacturer, and hotel construction. Visitor arrivals also registered sharp increases.

But Calvo's term as governor was marred by the teacher's strike of 1981, which lasted many months and caused deep divisions in Guam's education system. He lost to Bordallo in the 1982 election.

=== Ada-Blas administration ===
==== First term ====
His running mate and lieutenant governor was former senator Frank Blas. Ada served numerous terms in the Guam Legislature, becoming the first Republican speaker of the Legislature when the Republicans captured control of the body from the Democratic Party. Ada was elected Lt. Governor of Guam with running mate Paul McDonald Calvo in 1978, but declined the opportunity to serve as Calvo's running mate for re-election in 1982 and instead returned to the Legislature. Calvo lost the subsequent election to Ricky Bordallo. Ada is the only Guam political leader to serve as Speaker, lieutenant governor and governor. He stewarded Guam's economic expansion and pushed, successfully, for the return of land held by the US military.

When Ada began his first term Guam was in the throes of an economic recession with the government suffering under a crushing deficit. Ada put all his administration's efforts toward Guam's economic recovery, and eventually, he presided over one of the fastest-growing and strongest economies in the island's history due in part to a growth in tourism from a booming Japanese economy. He launched an austerity program at the start of his term and followed it with a program to encourage investment and trade from Asia. He eliminated the government deficit in three years. Despite a decrease in federal spending, Guam's economy doubled and some 25,000 new jobs were created. A majority of these jobs were in Guam's growing private sector. During Ada's first term, private sector employment outstripped public sector employment in Guam's economy for the first time in the modern era.

As chairperson of the Commission on Self-Determination, established in 1980 to lead the way toward determining a new political status for Guam, Ada presided over the completion of the Guam Commonwealth Act and presented to the people of Guam for approval in a plebiscite. Upon the Act's approval, Ada took it to US Congress. A strong advocate for self-government and self-determination for Guam, he called for an end to Guam's colonial status and pushed for the liberation of Guam's economy from federal regulations. Congress, however, did not act on the Guam Commonwealth Act and Guam's political status remains unresolved.

Ada believed that Guam needed to be financially healthy and not dependent on the US government in order to move forward politically. He said the federal government has tied Guam's hands more than once pointing to postwar security clearance, federal land takings for US bases, and the Jones Act which puts Guam at a financial disadvantage for shipping.

To address those concerns Ada said he supported the newly developed qualifying certificate program at the Guam Economic Development Authority to bring in foreign investment, pushed for good fuel rates and port lease fees to bring tuna transshipment to Guam, and worked on getting a visa waiver for visitors to Guam from Korea and Taiwan, all of which helped move Guam away from being dependent on US federal dollars. He also directed floating the first bond for infrastructure rather than ask for more federal funds.

==== Second term ====
In his second term, Ada capitalized on the fruits of his economic recovery program and made the largest investment in education in Guam up to that time. He directed the floating of a bond which made some $170 million available for the construction of a new high school in southern Guam (now Guam Southern High School), new elementary schools in Tamuning, Inarajan and Dededo, and reconstruction of schools in Upi and Ordot-Chalan Pago. Additionally, many new classrooms were built to relieve overcrowding in schools around the island. Operating budgets for the public schools were increased annually. Under Ada computers and computer classes were introduced in all Guam schools. At the end of his term, every grade level in every school had access to computer classes.

Guam suffered from a string of natural disasters during the second Ada administration. Four typhoons, one after another, hit Guam in 1991, with Typhoon Omar causing the most damage. On 8 August 1993 Guam was rocked by a very large earthquake. Measuring 7.8 on the moment magnitude scale, the shock had a maximum Mercalli intensity of VIII (Severe). Damage ran into millions of dollars, though only two buildings were destroyed. These disasters, combined with a recession in Japan, caused the tourism industry to suffer for a time.

=== Camacho-Moylan administration ===
Camacho-Moylan went on to defeat Speaker Antonio "Tony" Unpingco with his running mate Eddie Baza Calvo as a future governor in the Republican primary election on August 31, 2002, and ran against Guam Delegate Robert A. Underwood and his running mate, Senator Thomas "Tom" C. Ada for the general election. In 2002, Camacho teamed up with fellow senator Kaleo Moylan to run for Guam's governor and lieutenant governor and defeated Democratic contenders Guam Delegate Robert Underwood and Senator Thomas "Tom" Ada.

Guam was slammed by Super Typhoon Pongsona on 8 December 2003, shortly after Camacho and Moylan were elected into office. They opted not to have a formal inaugural celebration, due to the state of the island and instead chose to be sworn in with a ceremony at the Plaza de España at midnight after a celebratory mass at the Dulce Nombre de Maria Cathedral Basilica in Hagåtña – all under candle light.

The storm, just six months after another strong typhoon Chata’an hit the island, left the island reeling. The hospital, the schools, the airport, the seaport, hotels along with hundreds of homes and businesses, had all been severely damaged. The damages were estimated at $246 million by the Federal Emergency Management Agency-the largest natural disaster in US history, holding that record until Hurricane Katrina in 2005. Fuel tanks at the Cabras Island caught on fire making it unsafe for ships to come into the harbor. The Guam Telephone Authority and A.B. Won Pat International Airport were also shut down for a time. Soon, though, approximately 10,000 tourists who had been on Guam since before the storm were able to go home. Camacho and his administration worked on getting the power, water, communications and transportation systems running again, as well as re-opening the island's schools and getting assistance to people with typhoon damaged homes and businesses. Tourism went down to a minimum and the government was essentially bankrupt.

The Camacho Administration had other challenges to governing Guam as well. Due to concerns about the way the previous administration had handled government affairs, the Guam Legislature enacted legislation to remove power from the Office of the Governor in several ways. For the first time, Guam had an elected attorney general and an elected auditor. There was also an elected school board and appointed superintendent of education who had complete authority over the largest government agency, the Guam Department of Education.

Likewise, for the first time, the people of Guam had elected a board to run the government's utilities. The Consolidated Utilities Commission took management of the power and water out of the governor's hands. The Public Utilities Commission also set utility rates, and the Guam Telephone Authority was sold to a private company in 2005, the last government-owned telephone exchange in the United States, taking even more government responsibility away from the administration.

The court imposed penalties of more than $2.86 million against the government for failing to abide by the mandates of the consent decree. Ultimately, the federal court appointed a receiver to enforce the terms of the consent decree and assume all the functions of the solid waste management division of the Department of Public Works. The court ordered the government to deposit $20 million into an account while the government with the court-appointed receiver worked out a financing option for the consent decree projects. When a viable financing option was not presented to the court, the court ordered the government to deposit $993,700 on a weekly basis into the account. Eventually, the court suspended the weekly payments when the government issued bonds totaling $202 million for the consent decree projects.

In 2001, a group of mentally ill individuals who lived on Guam filed suit against Camacho's predecessor, Governor Gutierrez, for failure to provide community-based living services to the mentally ill. The court found that defendants had discriminated against plaintiffs by requiring them to reside in the adult In-patient units to receive services and that the services provided to Plaintiffs were not appropriate to their particular needs. Additionally, the court found that the Defendants had violated the Plaintiffs' constitutional rights to minimum standards of care and appointed a federal management team in 2010.

In 2004, a class-action lawsuit was filed against Camacho claiming refunds of approximately $112 million as a result of the earned income tax credit. The complaint was amended in 2006 wherein the class asked for approximately $135 million. The parties settled the case for $90 million. In anticipation of the court's approval of the settlement agreement, the Camacho Administration managed to set aside millions of dollars in order to begin payments according to the terms of the settlement agreement.

=== Camacho-Cruz administration ===
Due to various disagreements with Moylan during their first term, Camacho picked freshman senator Michael W. Cruz as his running mate in 2006. Camacho again defeated Robert Underwood (this time with senator Frank Aguon Jr. as running mate) to win the governorship for a second term.

In 2006 the news reached Guam that a large contingent of US Marines were to be relocated to Guam from Okinawa. At the same time, Guam was being considered to be a homeport for an aircraft carrier, a defense shield system, and as the host to a larger US Air Force presence. As many as 70,000 new people would possibly move to the island, some only for the buildup period, but many others would make Guam their home permanently.

All of these plans were tentative – requiring studies and analysis. The Camacho Administration began meeting with US defense officials to discuss the implications the buildup would have on the island. Before long those meetings and studies became highly politicized as certain senators wanted to be included in the planning meetings but were not.

Upon receiving news of the Department of Defense agreement with the Government of Japan, Camacho created a civilian-military task force to begin a detailed planning effort that continued throughout his second term. Letters, resolutions, petitions and news releases as well as scoping meetings at various locations around the island brought more attention to the matter than any other issue during Camacho's term. More than 10,000 people turned in comments on the Environmental Impact Statement about the military buildup describing their concerns, a first for Guam.

=== Calvo–Tenorio administration ===
On April 30, 2010, Calvo announced that he would leave the Legislature at the end of his present term. In the same speech, Calvo simultaneously told supporters at Chamorro Village that he intended to seek the Republican nomination for Governor of Guam in 2010. He chose Senator Ray Tenorio as his running mate. Calvo-Tenorio went on to defeat Lieutenant Governor Michael Cruz in the Republican primary election on September 4, 2010, and ran against former Democratic Governor Carl Gutierrez and his running mate, Senator Frank Aguon. The Calvo-Tenorio ticket won the 2010 gubernatorial election by a slim margin, and although the final count was enough to win the election, it was still within 2% of the Guiterrez Aguon ticket. Immediately after the election, a recount was ordered by the Guam Election Commission.

In March 2012, he endorsed Mitt Romney for president.

The Calvo–Tenorio team ran for a second term in the 2014 general election against the Democratic team of former Governor Gutierrez and Gary "Frank" Gumataotao.

== Republican members of the Guam Legislature ==
Senator	Position
Christopher M. Duenas	Minority Leader
Frank F. Blas Jr.	Minority Whip
Telo Taitague	—N/a
Mary Camacho Torres	—N/a
V. Anthony Ada	—N/a
Joanne M.S. Brown	—N/a
James C. Moylan	—N/a

The 2020 general election saw the seats of the two incumbent Republican senators taken by returning former senators Tony Ada, Chris Duenas, Frank Blas Jr. and Joanne M.S. Brown.

== Republican mayors and vice mayors of Guam ==
Name	Municipality
Mayor Paul M. McDonald	Agana Heights
Mayor Kevin J.T. Susuico	Agat
Vice Mayor Christopher "Chris" J. Fejeran	Agat
Mayor John A. Cruz	Hagatna
Mayor Allan "Al" R.G. Ungacta	Mangilao
Mayor Ernest T. Chargualaf	Merizo
Mayor Jesse L.G. Alig	Piti
Mayor Louise C. Rivera	Tamuning-Tumon
Vice Mayor Albert M. Toves	Tamuning-Tumon
Mayor Johnny A. Quinata	Umatac
Mayor Anthony "Tony" P. Sanchez	Yigo
Vice Mayor Loreto V. Leones	Yigo

Mayor Kevin J.T. Susuico and Vice Mayor Chris Fejeran have held their positions since they were first elected by the people of Agat in 2016.

After holding the position of Vice Mayor of Yigo since 2013, Anthony "Tony" P. Sanchez was elected as Mayor of Yigo with his running mate Loreto V. Leones in 2020. Likewise, Louise C. Rivera, who held the position of Vice Mayor since the 2012 election, was elected as Mayor of Barrigada with his running mate Albert M. Toves in 2020.

== Party officials ==
Name	Position
Juan Carlos Benítez	Chairman
La'Kiesha Pereda	Vice-chairwoman
Jim Marvin Terbio	Second Vice-Chairman
Bharat Shringi	Executive Director
Evelyn Casil	Treasurer
Sharon Cassidy	Secretary
Benny Pinaula	Sergeant-at-Arms
Eddie Baza Calvo	National Committeeman
Michelle Gibson	National Committeewoman

== Recent chairmen ==
Name	Term
Michael "Mike" Benito	2000's–2016
Victor Cruz	2016–2018
Jerry Crisostomo	2018–2020
Vicente "Tony" Ada	2020
Juan Carlos Benitez	2021–present

== Election performance ==
=== Governor ===
Election	Candidate	Outcome of election
1970	Carlos G. Camacho and Kurt S. Moylan	Won
1974	Paul M. Calvo and Antonio M. Palomo	Lost in primary
1974	Carlos G. Camacho and Kurt S. Moylan	Lost in Election Day
1978	Paul M. Calvo and Joseph F. Ada	Won
1982	Kurt S. Moylan and Frank F. Blas	Lost in primary
1982	Paul M. Calvo and Peter "Pete" F. Perez	Lost in Election Day
1986	Joseph F. Ada and Frank F. Blas	Won
1990	Joseph F. Ada and Frank F. Blas	Won
1994	Thomas "Tommy" Tanaka and Doris F. Brooks	Lost in Election Day
1994	Frank F. Blas and Simon A. Sanchez II	Lost in primary
1998	Joseph F. Ada and Felix P. Camacho	Lost in Election Day
2002	Antonio "Tony" Unpingco and Eddie J.B. Calvo	Lost in primary
2002	Felix P. Camacho and Kaleo S. Moylan	Won
2006	Kaleo S. Moylan and Francis E. Santos	Lost in primary
2006	Felix P. Camacho and Michael W. Cruz	Won
2010	Michael W. Cruz and James Espaldon	Lost in primary
2010	Eddie J.B. Calvo and Ray S. Tenorio	Won
2014	Eddie J.B. Calvo and Ray S. Tenorio	Won
2018	Ray S. Tenorio and V. Anthony "Tony" Ada	Lost in Election Day

== Notable members ==
=== Governors ===
- Carlos Camacho (Appointed/1st Governor of Guam)
- Paul McDonald Calvo (3rd Governor of Guam)
- Joseph Franklin Ada (5th Governor of Guam/2nd Lt. Governor)
- Felix Perez Camacho (7th Governor of Guam)
- Eddie Baza Calvo (8th Governor of Guam)

=== Lieutenant governors ===
- Kurt Moylan (1st Lieutenant Governor of Guam)
- Frank Blas (5th Lieutenant Governor of Guam)
- Kaleo Moylan (7th Lieutenant Governor of Guam)
- Dr. Michael Cruz (8th Lieutenant Governor of Guam)
- Ray Tenorio (9th Lieutenant Governor of Guam)

=== Congressional delegates ===
- Vicente T. "Ben" Blaz (2nd Representative of Guam)
- James C. “Tim” Moylan (6th Representative of Guam)

=== Speakers of the Guam Legislature ===
- Carlos P. Taitano (3rd Speaker of the Guam Legislature under the Territorial Party)
- Joseph Franklin Ada (6th Speaker of the Guam Legislature)
- Tommy Tanaka (7th Speaker of the Guam Legislature)
- Antonio R. Unpingco (12th Speaker of the Guam Legislature)
- Mark Forbes (14th Speaker of the Guam Legislature)

=== Senators of the Guam Legislature ===
- James Espaldon (Former Senator of the Guam Legislature)
- Tommy Morrison (Former Senator of the Guam Legislature)
- Tommy Tanaka (Former Senator of the Guam Legislature)
- Tony Blaz (Former Senator of the Guam Legislature)
- Tony Palomo (Former Senator of the Guam Legislature)

=== Mayors ===
- John A. Cruz (Mayor of Hagatna)
- Paul M. McDonald (Mayor of Agana Heights)
- Felix Ungacta (Mayor of Hagatna)

== See also ==
- Political party strength in Guam
- Guam Legislature

== Sources ==
- Rogers, Robert F. (1995). Destiny's Landfall: A History of Guam. Honolulu: University of Hawaii Press.
- Shuster, Donald R. (2004). "Elections on Guam, 1970–2002". Pacific Studies. 27 (1/2): 22–67.
- Stade, Ronald (1998). Pacific Passages: World Culture and Local Politics in Guam. Stockholm: Stockholm Studies in Social Anthropology.
