= 1974 Guamanian gubernatorial election =

Local election in Guam

- November 5, 1974 (first round); November 14, 1974 (runoff)
- Turnout: 94.65% (first round); 94.26% ▲ (runoff)
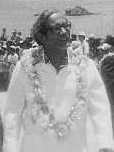

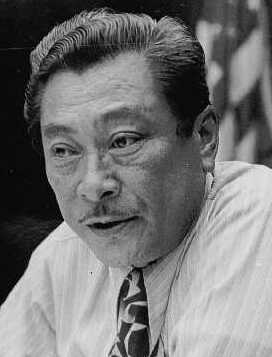

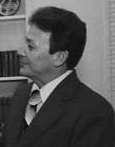
Candidate	Ricardo Bordallo	Carlos Camacho	Paul McDonald Calvo
Party	Democratic	Republican	Write-In for '74
Running mate	Rudy Sablan	Kurt Moylan	Tony Palomo
First round	8,830; 39.52%	7,203; 32.24%	6,311; 28.24%
Runoff	11,441; 51.41%	10,814; 48.59%	Eliminated
- Bordallo: 30–40% 40–50% 50–60% 60–70% Camacho: 30–40% 40–50% 50–60% 60–70% Calvo: 40–50%
Governor of Guam before election
Carlos Camacho
Republican
Elected Governor of Guam
Ricardo Bordallo
Democratic

The 1974 Guamanian gubernatorial election was held on November 5, with a runoff on November 14.

The Republican primary was hotly contested, with incumbent Governor Carlos Camacho narrowly winning re-nomination with only 298 votes against future governor Paul McDonald Calvo. Despite this loss, Calvo ran a robust write-in campaign that was well-funded. He formed a third party in the territory called the Write-In for '74 Party, winning third with 28% of the vote and forcing a runoff between Camacho and Democratic challenger Ricardo Bordallo, the latter of whom ended up winning the election. Because of their official status as a political party, two Write-In for '74 Party members were appointed to the Electoral Commission, both of whom resigned their posts in July 1975 after the party officially disbanded.

== Republican primary ==
1974 Guamanian gubernatorial Republican primary
Party	Candidate	Votes	%
Republican	Carlos Camacho (inc.) Kurt Moylan (inc.)	5,633	51.36%
Republican	Paul McDonald Calvo Tony Palomo	5,335	48.64%
Total votes		10,968	100.00%

== Democratic primary ==
1974 Guamanian gubernatorial Democratic primary
Party	Candidate	Votes	%
Democratic	Ricardo Bordallo Rudy Sablan	4,435	49.75%
Democratic	Sanchez Torres	1,756	19.70%
Democratic	Guerrero Flores	1,469	16.48%
Democratic	Arriola Nelson	1,254	14.07%
Total votes		8,914	100.00%

== General election and runoff ==
1974 Guamanian gubernatorial general election
Party	Candidate	Votes	%
Democratic	Ricardo Bordallo Rudy Sablan	8,830	39.52%
Republican	Carlos Camacho (inc.) Kurt Moylan (inc.)	7,203	32.24%
Write-In for '74	Paul McDonald Calvo Tony Palomo	6,311	28.24%
Total votes		22,344	100.00%

1974 Guamanian gubernatorial runoff election
Party	Candidate	Votes	%
Democratic	Ricardo Bordallo Rudy Sablan	11,441	51.41%
Republican	Carlos Camacho (inc.) Kurt Moylan (inc.)	10,814	48.59%
Total votes		22,255	100.00%
