= 1978 Guam general election =

- 7 November 1978
- Gubernatorial election
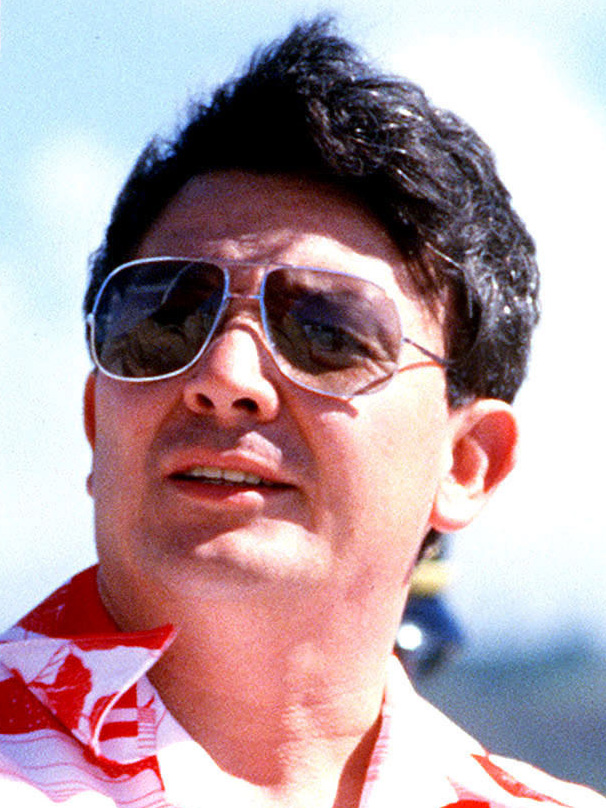

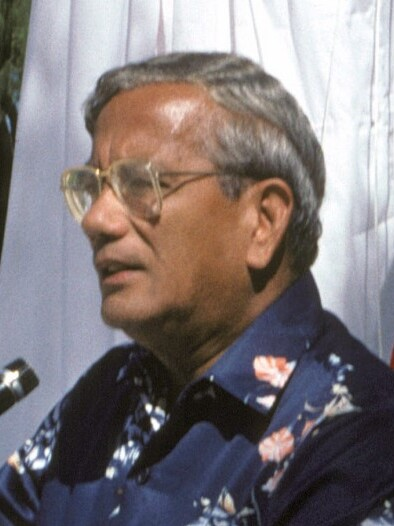
Nominee	Paul McDonald Calvo	Ricardo Bordallo
Party	Republican	Democratic
Running mate	Joseph Franklin Ada	Pedro C. Sanchez
Popular vote	13,649	12,540
Percentage	52.12%	47.88%
Governor before election
Ricardo Bordallo
Democratic Party
Elected Governor
Paul McDonald Calvo
Republican

General elections were held in Guam on 7 November 1978 to elect the Governor, Lieutenant Governor, members of the Legislature, the island's United States House of Representatives delegate and members of the Territorial Board of Education, as well as determining whether Judge Richard H. Benson from the Superior Court should remain in place. Primary elections were held on 2 September.

== Electoral system ==
The electoral system for the legislature was changed prior to the elections. Previously voters had elected all 21 members of the legislature from a single national district. The 1978 elections saw the island split into several districts, with five elected in the First District, seven in the Second District, four in the Third District and five in the Fourth District.

== Results ==
=== Primary elections ===
Governor and Lieutenant Governor
Party	Candidate	Lieutenant candidate	Votes	%
Democratic Party	Ricardo Bordallo	Pedro C. Sanchez	6,995	34.2
Democratic Party	Rudy Sablan	Jose Iglesias Leon Guerrero	5,153	25.2
Republican Party	Paul McDonald Calvo	Joseph Franklin Ada	7,525	36.8
Independent	Carl Gutierrez	Joseph Dizon	762	3.7
Invalid/blank votes			2,845	–
Total			23,280	100
Registered voters/turnout			29,809	78.1
Source: Guam Election Commission

Delegate
Candidate	Party	Votes	%
Antonio Borja Won Pat	Democratic Party	19,367	95.3
Write-in		951	4.7
Invalid/blank votes		2,757	–
Total		23,075	100
Registered voters/turnout		29,809	77.4
Source: Guam Election Commission

=== Governor ===
Candidate	Lieutenant candidate	Party	Votes	%
Republican Party	Paul McDonald Calvo	Joseph Franklin Ada	13,649	52.1
Democratic Party	Ricardo Bordallo	Pedro C. Sanchez	12,540	47.9
Invalid/blank votes			1,090	–
Total			27,279	100
Registered voters/turnout			32,170	84.8
Source: Guam Election Commission

=== Legislature ===
Party	Votes	%	Seats
Republican Party	72,678	55.0	14
Democratic Party	59,468	45.0	7
Total	132,146	100	21
Source: Guam Election Commission

=== Delegate ===
Candidate	Party	Votes	%
Antonio Borja Won Pat	Democratic Party	21,123	91.0
Write-in		2,088	9.0
Invalid/blank votes		3,957	–
Total		27,168	100
Registered voters/turnout		32,170	84.5
Source: Guam Election Commission

=== Judicial question ===
Shall Judge Richard H. Benson of the Superior Court be retained in office?

Choice	Votes	%
For	20,476	80.8
Against	4,876	19.2
Invalid/blank votes	1,822	–
Total	27,174	100
Registered voters/turnout	32,170	84.5
Source: Guam Election Commission
