= Rudy Sablan =

Guamanian politician

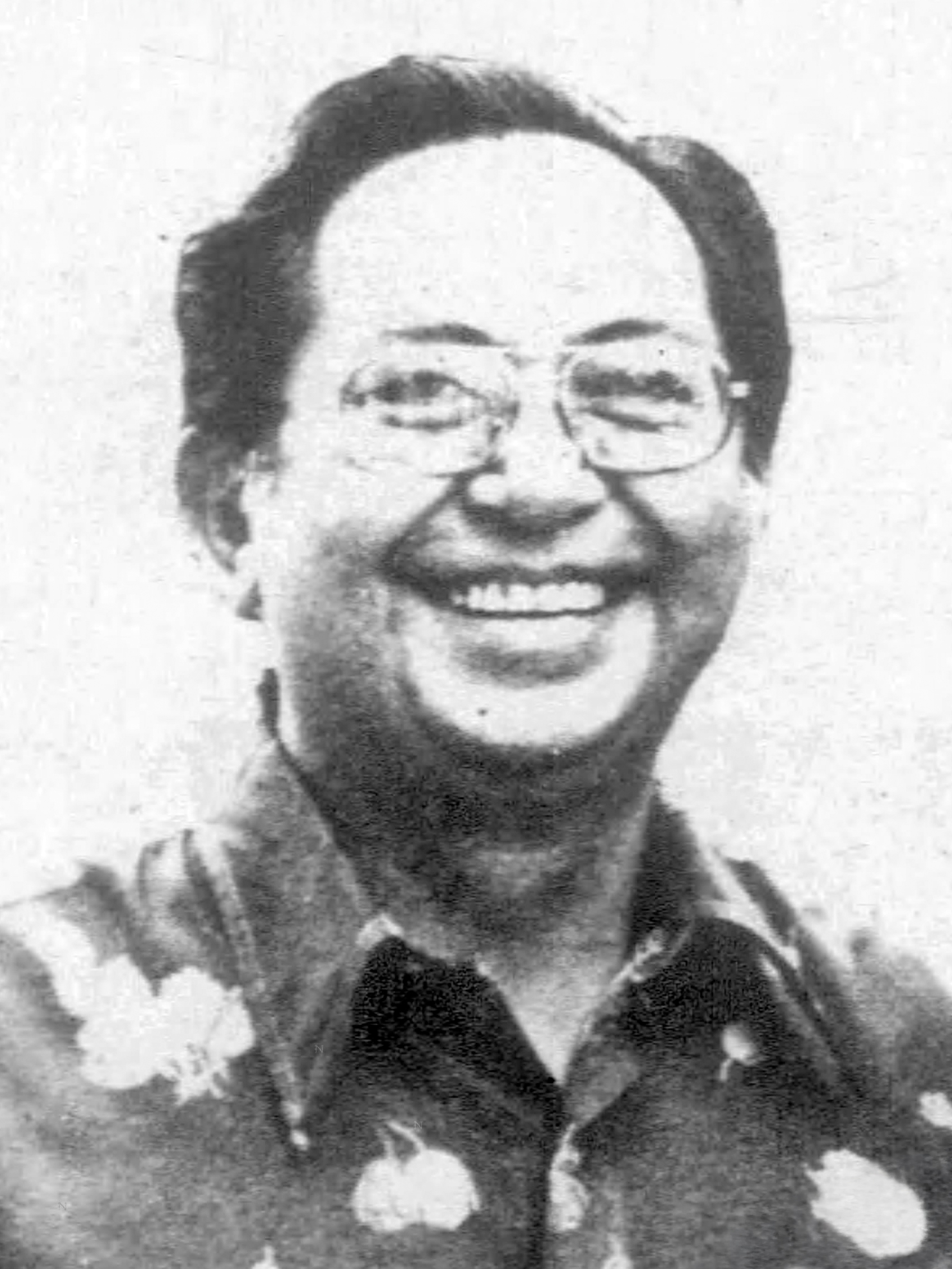
- Sablan in 1978

2nd Lieutenant Governor of Guam
- In office January 6, 1975 – January 1, 1979
- Governor: Ricardo Bordallo
- Preceded by: Kurt Moylan
- Succeeded by: Joseph F. Ada

Personal details
- Born: Rudolph Guerrero Sablan; November 13, 1931 Agana, Guam
- Died: July 24, 1995 (aged 63) United States
- Party: Democratic
- Spouse: Esperanza Cruz San Nicolas (m. 1960)
- Children: 2
- Education: Loyola University of Los Angeles

Rudolph Guerrero Sablan (November 13, 1931 – July 24, 1995) was a Guamanian politician and member of the Democratic Party of Guam. Sablan served as the second lieutenant governor of Guam from January 6, 1975, to January 1, 1979, under Governor Ricardo Bordallo.

== Biography ==
=== Early life and education ===
Sablan was born in Agana, Guam, which is now known as Hagåtña. He graduated from Father Dueñas Memorial School in 1950 as the valedictorian of his class. Sablan attended Boston College from 1950 to 1952 and received his bachelor's degree in political science 1954 from the former Loyola University of Los Angeles, which is now part of Loyola Marymount University.

Sablan was hired by a Navy Public Works Center after college before being drafted in the United States Army in 1956. He attend basic training in Hawaii and remained there to serve as an intelligence analyst and area studies specialist with the 14th Radio Broadcasting and Leaflet Battalion. He served until December 1957 and returned to Guam after an honorable discharge.

== Career ==
=== Civil service ===
Once he had returned to Guam, Sablan took a job within the territorial government. He was quickly promoted to administrative positions within government agencies, including the Director of Labor and Personnel by 1961. His work caught the attention of Governor Manuel F.L. Guerrero, who appointed Sablan as both assistant Secretary of Guam and executive assistant to the Governor during the 1960s. The appointments allowed Sablan to oversee much of Guam's executive branch.

=== Political career ===
In 1974, Governor Carlos Camacho, a Republican and the first elected Governor of Guam, sought re-election for a second term, together with his Lt. Governor Kurt Moylan. Four Democrats declared their intention to challenge Camacho, including Ricardo Bordallo, former Gov. Manuel Flores Leon Guerrero (who teamed with David D.L. Flores as his running mate for Lt. Governor); Pedro C. Sanchez, the former President of University of Guam (who teamed with Esteban U. Torres), and Joaquin C. "Kin" Arriola (teamed with school principal, Ted S. Nelson). On the Republican side, a rival team, Senator Paul McDonald Calvo with running mate Tony Palomo, challenged Governor Camacho for the GOP nomination.

Democratic gubernatorial candidate Ricardo Bordallo chose Rudy Sablan as his running mate for Lt. Governor. The Bordallo-Sablan team won the 1974 Democratic primary election, defeating the three other candidates. Governor Carlos Camacho won the Republican nomination, beating the Calvo-Palomo ticket, but badly dividing Guam's Republican Party. The Republican split worked to the Democrat's advantage, allowing Bordallo to defeat Governor Camacho in the November gubernatorial election.

Governor Bordallo and Lt. Governor Rudy Sablan were sworn into office on January 6, 1975. Sablan became the second elected Lt. Governor in Guam's history. However, Bordallo and Sablan frequent, public spats and disagreements on policy issues plagued the Bordallo-Sablan administration throughout their four-year term. The political relationship between the Governor and Lt. Governor broke down by the 1978 general election. In 1978, Rudy Sablan ran against Governor Bordallo in the gubernatorial election. Sablan chose Jose L. "Joe" Leon Guerrero as his running mate for Lt. Governor, while Governor Bordallo replaced Sablan with Dr. Pedro C. Sanchez, a historian and educator, on his ticket. Governor Bordallo defeated Sablan in the 1978 Democratic primary, taking 34.2% while Sablan-Guerrero placed second with 25% of the vote. Ricardo Bordallo ultimately lost his re-election bid to Republican Paul McDonald Calvo in November 1978.

Four years later, Sablan once again announced his candidacy for Governor of Guam in the 1982 gubernatorial election. Sablan again picked his Joe Leon Guerrero, as his running mate for Lt. Governor (Sablan and Guerrero had also run on the same ticket in 1978). However, the Sablan-Guerrero lost a rematch in Democratic primary to Ricardo Bordallo and his new running mate, Edward Diego Reyes. Bordallo defeated Sablan by 35 percentage points in the Democratic primary to win the nomination. Bordallo, in a second political rematch from 1978, then beat Governor Paul McDonald Calvo in the November 1982 general election. (Calvo had previously ousted Bordallo from office in 1978).

=== Later career and life ===
Governor Ricky Bordallo appointed Sablan as a member of Commission on Self-Determination, which oversaw the future relationship between Guam and the United States, from 1983 until 1987. Sablan remained a proponent the Guam Commonwealth Act, even after the end of the Bordallo-Reyes administration in 1987. In December 1989, Sablan testified in support of the Guam Commonwealth Act at the sole U.S. congressional hearing on the Act, which was held in Honolulu.

In 1983, Sablan was appointed Chairman of the board of directors of the Guam Airport Authority, a territorial government agency which operates the island's international airport (now known as Antonio B. Won Pat International Airport). Under Sablan, the airport's terminals and runways were modernized and expanded to encourage a growing tourism industry.

Sablan worked to reconcile the various, often infighting, factions of the Democratic Party of Guam by 1993. He endorsed the 1994 gubernatorial campaign of Governor Carl Gutierrez and Lt. Gov. Madeleine Bordallo and has been credited with helping the Gutierrez-Bordallo team win the 1994 general election.

Sablan became an integral advisor to the new Gutierrez administration. Governor Carl Gutierrez appointed Sablan to the Commission on Self-Determination from 1994 until his death in 1995. (Sablan had previously served on the commission from 1983 to 1987 under Governor Ricky Bordallo). In 1994 and 1995, Gutierrez appointed Sablan as part of a team who represented Guam at the Base Reuse and Realignment Commission hearings in San Francisco, California.

Sablan died on July 24, 1995 (equivalent to the early morning of July 25, Guam time) at the age of 63.

Party political offices
Preceded by Richard F. Taitano	Democratic nominee for Lieutenant Governor of Guam; 1974	Succeeded by Pedro C. Sanchez
Political offices
Preceded by Kurt Moylan	Lieutenant Governor of Guam; 1975–1979	Succeeded by Joseph Franklin Ada
