= Senator Calvo =

Senator Calvo may refer to:

- Eddie Baza Calvo (born 1961), Senate of Guam
- Paul McDonald Calvo (born 1934), Senate of Guam
