= Senator Camacho =

Senator Camacho may refer to:

- Carlos Camacho (1924–1979), Senate of Guam
- Felix Perez Camacho (born 1957), Senate of Guam
