= Tanglewood (Chillicothe, Ohio) =

Historic house in Ohio, United States

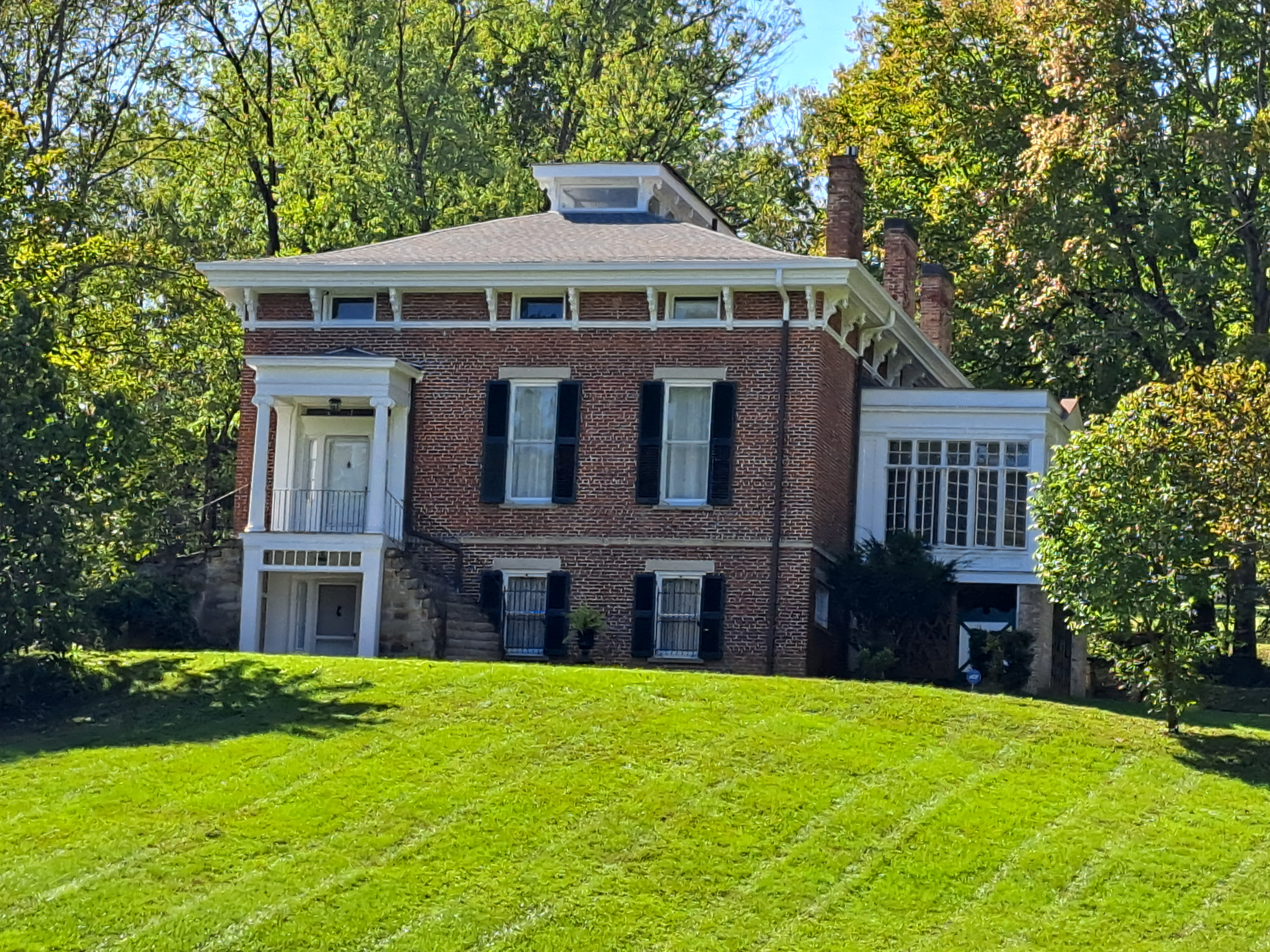
Historic Tanglewood, October, 2024

Tanglewood is a historic house on the western side of Chillicothe, Ohio, United States. Built in 1826, it features a combination of the Greek Revival and Italianate styles of architecture, and it is one of the best preserved examples of the rare "monitor" style of residential design.

A Catholic clergyman, John McClean, arranged for the house to be built; however, he sold it to Richard Douglas, a local lawyer, before construction was complete. Douglas owned the property little longer than did McClean, dying soon after it was finished. Mr. Douglas' son, Dr. Albert Douglas, Sr., inherited the property from his father and was active in the region's Underground Railroad. The recorded oral history of a former worker at the residence sets forth that Dr. Douglas hid numerous escaped slaves in the attic, making many trips late at night to the next stop with them hidden within the hay wagon. Tanglewood earned the designation of Historic Underground Railroad Site from The Friends of Freedom Society, Inc.

The house's most prominent resident was William Edwin Safford, who lived there as a boy; growing to adulthood, he developed a strong reputation as a leading naturalist in the islands of the South Pacific Ocean, and he was later appointed to be the first Vice-Governor of Guam after the United States conquered the island in 1898.

Built of brick on a stone foundation, it is covered with a roof of asphalt, and it features various other elements of brick and iron. Tanglewood is an elaborate two and one-half story house with many fine Greek Revival elements. Among its details are multiple pillared porches featuring capitals of the Ionic order, an ornate frieze above the windows, and some elements of the Italianate style that was only just beginning to come into popularity in the middle of the nineteenth century. Tanglewood may have been named for the hundreds of feet of Virginia Creeper, ivy and grape vines which twist their way through the surrounding woods.

In 1979, Tanglewood was listed on the National Register of Historic Places because of its well-preserved historic architecture. It is one of at least two Ohio monitor houses that are listed on the Register, along with one in the village of St. Paris that is known simply as the "Monitor House." Tanglewood remains a private residence.
