= Pedro C. Sanchez =

Guamanian politician, educator and historian

Pedro C. "Doc" Sanchez

Senator of the Guam Legislature
- In office January 5, 1987 – August 8, 1987
- Succeeded by: Madeleine Z. Bordallo

President of the University of Guam
- In office 1970–1974
- Preceded by: I.G. Andrews
- Succeeded by: Antonio C. Yamashita

Personal details
- Born: Pedro Cruz Sanchez; June 29, 1925 Guam
- Died: August 16, 1987 (aged 62) Honolulu, Hawaii
- Party: Democratic Party of Guam
- Spouse: Florida Galeai'i
- Children: 7

Pedro Cruz Sanchez (June 29, 1925 – August 16, 1987) also known as Doc Sanchez, was a Guamanian politician, educator and historian, was President of the University of Guam from 1970 to 1974.

== Early life and career ==
Sanchez was born on June 29, 1925, to school superintendent and Tamuning-Tumon Commissioner Simon Angeles Sanchez and Antonia Cruz Sanchez.

Sanchez was married to Florida Galeai'i, and together they have had children: Simon II, Anthony Peter, Antolina S. Leon Guerrero, Florida, Dolores Anne, Paul, and Amanda.

Sanchez was President of the University of Guam from 1970 to 1974.

== 1978 Bordallo-Sanchez gubernatorial campaign ==
Ricardo J. Bordallo ran with Sanchez as his running mate in the 1978 election for Governor of Guam. The Bordallo-Sanchez ticket was defeated in the general election by the Republican Calvo-Ada team.

== Term in Guam Legislature and death ==
In 1986, Sanchez ran as a Democrat for a seat in the Guam Legislature. In the primary, Sanchez placed 18, and proceeded to the general election where he placed 17 and was elected to serve as a senator in the 19th Guam Legislature. Sanchez died in Honolulu, Hawaii on August 16, 1987, at the age of 62. A special election was held in November 1987 to fill the vacant seat left by Sanchez' death.

== Electoral history ==
1974 Democratic gubernatorial primary results
Party	Candidate	Votes	%
Democratic	Ricardo J. Bordallo/Rudolph G. Sablan	4,435	49.75%
Democratic	Pedro C. Sanchez/Esteban U. Torres	1,756	19.70%
Democratic	Manuel F.L. Guerrero/David D.L. Flores	1,469	16.48%
Democratic	Joaquin C. Arriola/Theodore "Ted" S. Nelson	1,254	14.07%

1978 Guam gubernatorial general election results
Party	Candidate	Votes	%
Republican	Paul M. Calvo/Joseph F. Ada	13,649	52.12%
Democratic	Ricardo J. Bordallo/Pedro C. Sanchez	12,540	47.88%

Party political offices
Preceded by Rudolph G. Sablan	Democratic nominee for Lieutenant Governor of Guam; 1978	Succeeded by Edward D. Reyes
