= Scotty Moylan =

Guamanian businessman (1916-2010)

- Born: Francis Lester Moylan; March 23, 1916; Chicago, Illinois, U.S.
- Died: August 24, 2010 (aged 94); Tamuning, Guam
- Resting place: Diamond Head Memorial Park; Honolulu, Hawaii
- Occupation: businessman
- Spouse: Yuk Lan Ho
- Children: 4, including Kurt
- Relatives: Kaleo Moylan (grandson); Douglas Moylan (grandson)

Francis Lester "Scotty" Moylan (March 23, 1916 – August 24, 2010) was a Guamanian businessman and patriarch of the Moylan family, which includes his son, former Lieutenant Governor Kurt Moylan, his nephew, U.S. House delegate James Moylan, and his grandsons, former Lt. Governor Kaleo Moylan and Guam's first elected attorney general, Douglas Moylan. He was the founder of Moylan Enterprises and became one of Guam's leading businessmen after moving to the island in 1946. In addition to his many business ventures, Moylan opened the first A&W Restaurants franchise in Guam and introduced the first Volkswagens to the island in the 1960s.

== Biography ==
=== Early life ===
Scotty Moylan was born in Chicago, Illinois, on March 23, 1916. He was raised on the South Side of Chicago. He was of Irish and Polish descent. In 1930, Moylan, who was just 15 years old, decided to leave Chicago to seek new opportunities in New York City during the Great Depression. He jumped on a train which he hoped would take him to New York. However, instead of going to New York, the train travelled west from Chicago. He made his way to Spokane, Washington, where he enlisted in the United States Army. The Army stationed Moylan in Hawaii following his enlistment. He witnessed the Attack on Pearl Harbor in 1941.

Moylan started and owned several businesses in Hawaii during the war. While stationed there, he met his future wife, Yuk Lan Kamaka Ho. The couple had four children: Kurt (married to Judith), Richard (married to Jane), Francis Jr. (married to Debbie) and Lena (married to Charlie Alston). He is the grandfather of Kaleo Moylan a former Lt. Governor, Doug Moylan an attorney; and Kamaka M. Alston, a realtor.

=== Guam ===
Moylan was among a number of businesspeople and entrepreneurs who moved to Guam following World War II to help rebuild the island. He and his wife arrived on Guam in 1946, where he would become one of the territory's most successful and flourishing businessmen.

Moylan opened Moylan Enterprises, a wholesale and retail store in downtown Hagåtña, which was known as Agana at the time. His retail business sold cameras, appliances, hardware, food and film. The wholesale side of the business brought products from the mainland United States and Japan to Guam, including consumer brand products from Westinghouse, Pfizer, Hallmark, Smith & Wesson and Jergens.

Moylan expanded into a number of other business ventures throughout Guam. He founded Moylan's All American Insurance, Moylan's Bank and Trust Company, Moylan's Gun Store, and Moylan's Sporting Goods. He first introduced Volkswagen vehicles to Guam in the 1960s through Moylan Motors Company, which also sold Chrysler car. Additionally, Moylan opened the A&W Restaurants franchise in Guam.

Moylan founded the Lions Club of Guam. He also served as a reserve police officer.

Moylan's grandson, Douglas Moylan, noted that his grandfather acted as an adviser and fundraiser during his 2002 campaign for attorney general. Douglas Moylan won the 2002 election, becoming Guam's first elected attorney general.

Scotty Moylan died on August 24, 2010, at Guam Memorial Hospital in Tamuning at the age of 94. His funeral was held at the Dulce Nombre de Maria Cathedral Basilica. Moylan was buried at Diamond Head Memorial Park in Honolulu, Hawaii, on September 3, 2010.
