= Ricardo Bordallo =

2nd and 4th Governor of Guam (1927–1990)

Ricky Bordallo
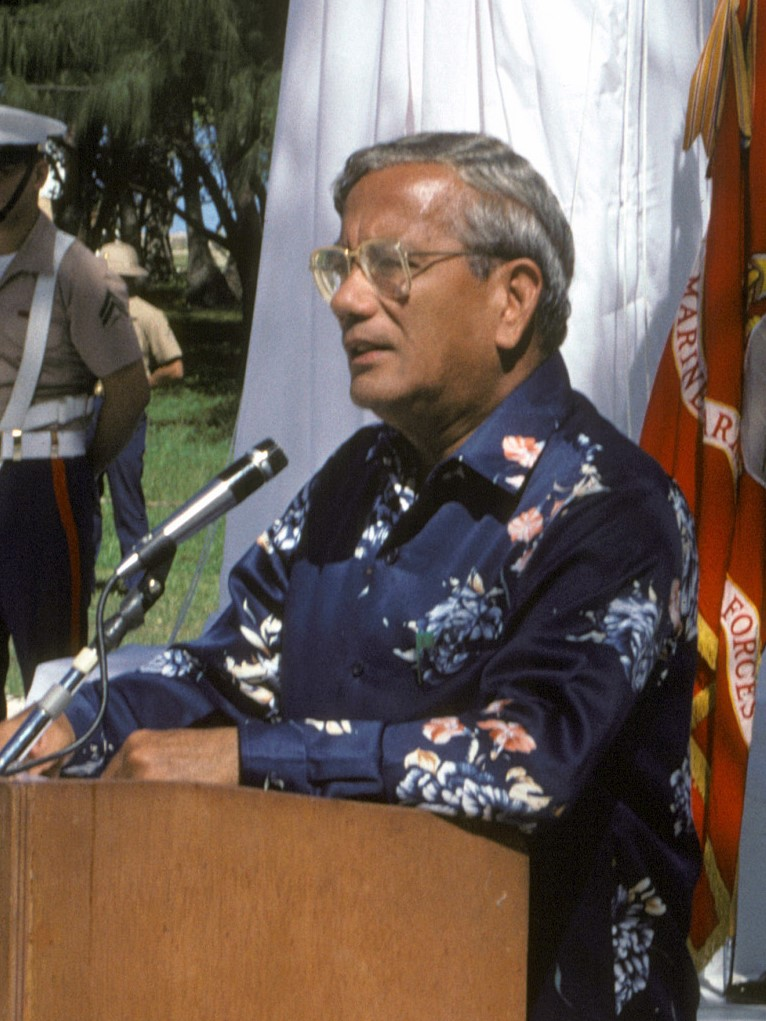
- Bordallo speaking at dedication in 1984

2nd and 4th Governor of Guam
- In office January 3, 1983 – January 5, 1987
- Lieutenant: Edward Diego Reyes
- Preceded by: Paul McDonald Calvo
- Succeeded by: Joseph Franklin Ada
- In office January 6, 1975 – January 1, 1979
- Lieutenant: Rudy Sablan
- Preceded by: Carlos Camacho
- Succeeded by: Paul McDonald Calvo

Chair of the Guam Democratic Party
- In office 1971–1973
- Preceded by: Joaquin Perez
- Succeeded by: Francisco Carbullido
- In office 1961–1963
- Preceded by: Position established
- Succeeded by: Adrian Cristobal

Member of the Guam Legislature
- In office January 7, 1957 – January 4, 1971

Personal details
- Born: Ricardo Jerome Bordallo; December 11, 1927 Hagåtña, Guam
- Died: January 31, 1990 (aged 62) Hagåtña, Guam
- Party: Democratic
- Spouse: Madeleine Zeien (m. 1953–1990)
- Children: 1
- Education: University of San Francisco (attended)

Ricardo Jerome "Ricky" Bordallo (/bərˈdæljoʊ/; December 11, 1927 – January 31, 1990) was an American politician and businessman, who served two terms as the second and fourth governor of Guam with Lieutenant Governor Rudy Sablan from 1975 to 1979, and with Lieutenant Governor Edward Diego Reyes from 1983 to 1987. A member of the Democratic Party of Guam, Bordallo previously served as a senator in the Guam Legislature from 1957 to 1971.

== Early life ==
Bordallo was born on December 11, 1927 in Hagåtña, Guam. He was the son of Baltazar Jeronimo "BJ" Bordallo (August 8, 1900 – May 10, 1984), a businessman, and Josefina Torres Pangelinan (December 18, 1904 – December 2, 1945). BJ Bordallo was a popular politician from the 1930s to 1950s. Ricardo Bordallo was the first child of a family including his brother Paul Joseph Bordallo (1930–2007), who was a former senator. Ricardo Bordallo attended the University of San Francisco before returning to Guam and becoming a successful businessman and car dealer. Among other positions, he was the proprietor of Ricky's Suburban Club, a restaurant and bar in Tamuning, Guam. Bordallo also established Ricky's Auto Company in the mid-1950s, which became Toyota's first American car dealer.

== Personal life ==
Bordallo was married to Madeleine Zeien Bordallo in 1953; together they have one daughter Deborah, and one grandchild, Nicole Nelson. Bordallo's widow was an unsuccessful candidate for governor in 1990, and served as Lieutenant Governor of Guam from 1995 to 2003, and as the island's Delegate to the United States House of Representatives from 2003 until losing renomination in the 2018 election.

== Political career ==
=== Senator of the Guam Legislature ===
Bordallo was first elected to the Guam Legislature in 1956 as a member of the Popular Party (predecessor to the Democratic Party of Guam). Bordallo served in the territorial legislature from 1957 to 1970 and twice served as Chairman of the Democratic Party of Guam. As a senator, he introduced the law that first created an unofficial Guam delegate to the U.S. Congress.

=== Bordallo-Taitano gubernatorial ticket (1970) ===
Bordallo first ran for governor in the 1970 election, which was the first election in which the people of Guam were allowed to elect their governor. He ran with Senator Richard "Dick" Taitano against two other former gubernatorial teams: Former governor Manuel Guerrero and his running mate Dr. Antonio C. (Tony) Yamashita, as well as attorney and former speaker Joaquin C. "Kin" Arriola and retired judge and former senator Vicente Bamba. Bordallo-Taitano came in first in the primary election by a close margin over Guerrero-Yamashita, and then won the run-off election. However, due to the contentious Democratic campaign, Bordallo-Taitano lost in the general election to the Republican team of incumbents Carlos G. Camacho and Kurt S. Moylan. The election was significant for Bordallo, however, as he and Dick Taitano created Guam's first "grassroots" political organization throughout the villages.

== Governorship (1975–1979) ==
=== Bordallo-Sablan gubernatorial ticket (1974) ===
Bordallo's wife, Madeleine, also proved to be a passionate and untiring campaigner and helped draw many supporters to the organization. This organization and base of supporters would prove valuable when Bordallo ran again in the 1974 election. Madeleine Bordallo was most known for her humanitarian pursuits. She sponsored many civil cultural events including the Guam Symphony and a program for instructing children in the Suzuki method of violin.

Bordallo ran for governor for a second time in 1974, this time with Rudolph "Rudy" Guerrero Sablan. They were up against four other Democratic tickets: Manuel Guerrero and running mate David D.L. Flores; Pedro C. Sanchez and Esteban U. Torres; and Joaquin C. "Kin" Arriola and Theodore "Ted" Nelson. Dick Taitano was the manager of the Bordallo-Sablan campaign and broadened the organization he had set up in 1970. This organization proved decisive, and Bordallo-Sablan easily beat the other Democratic teams.

The Bordallo-Sablan team then went on to beat the Camacho-Moylan team, which had just barely beat the Republican rival team of Paul Calvo and Antonio Palomo in the primary. Calvo ran as a write-in candidate in the general election, drawing support from Camacho-Moylan, and Bordallo-Sablan won by less than 600 of the 22,000-plus votes.

=== First term 1975–1979 ===
Bordallo's first term in office, from 1975 to 1979, was contentious. He was characterized as highly charismatic but highly controversial. Someone wasn't afraid to speak his mind on any issue. During this time the issue of independence, statehood, commonwealth status or continuation as a U.S. territory was put to the voters. Senator Paul Bordallo, his brother, favored independence. The voters elected to keep the status quo as a dependent territory. Bordallo was successful in securing $367 million for typhoon reconstruction, capital improvement project and Government of Guam investments. A new was secured at the Guam Memorial Hospital.

=== Bordallo-Sanchez Gubernatorial Ticket (1978) ===
In 1978, Bordallo ran for re-election with a former University of Guam president Dr. Pedro C. Sanchez as his running mate for lieutenant governor. Lieutenant Governor Sablan declared his candidacy for the gubernatorial election and was a candidate in the September 1978 Democratic primary, along with his running mate for Lt. Governor was Attorney Jose Iglesias Leon Guerrero. Bordallo won the Democratic primary and defeated the Sablan-Leon Guerrero campaign with more votes. However, Bordallo lost to the Republican Calvo-Ada team in the gubernatorial general election.

== Governorship (1983–1987) ==
=== Bordallo-Reyes gubernatorial ticket (1982) ===
Bordallo ran for a third time in 1982 with a political unknown, Air Force Colonel Eddie Reyes, as his running mate. He beat out Democrats Carl Gutierrez and John P. Aguon for the Democratic nomination and won office yet again. Promising to guide Guam out of the recession and push for commonwealth status, the Bordallo/Reyes ticket defeated incumbent Governor Calvo in the 1982 elections.

=== Second term 1983–1987 ===
Bordallo's second term in office, from 1983 to 1987. During his second term, Bordallo chaired the Commission for Self-Determination and spearheaded the drafting of the Guam Commonwealth Act developed by June 4, 1986. He addressed Guam's education problems with his 1983 "Blueprint for Excellence" and worked on the accreditation status of the University of Guam. He went to Washington, D.C., on January 20, 1985, with congressman Ben Blaz at the Officers Club, and Andrews Air Force Base.

=== Bordallo-Reyes gubernatorial ticket (1986) ===
Bordallo sought re-election with Lt. Gov Edward D. Reyes as his running mate. The ticket won the Democratic nomination when they defeated Senator Gutierrez and Senator John P. Aguon in the primary election. Bordallo lost the general election to former Lieutenant Governor Ada and Senator Frank F. Blas in the general election.

== Post-governorship ==
=== Criminal conviction ===
In February 1987, Bordallo was convicted on ten counts of corruption and was sentenced to nine years in prison and fined more than $100,000. He was accused of receiving over $100,000 worth of bribes and extortion in connection with favors he performed in office for campaign contributions. His convictions on eight counts of bribery and extortion were overturned in August 1988, leaving charges of obstruction of justice and witness tampering. On December 13, 1989, he was sentenced by judge Cristobal C. Duenas to four years in prison on the remaining charges.

=== Suicide ===
After his failed appeal to the U.S. Supreme Court, Bordallo faced a four-year sentence in a federal minimum-security prison beginning on February 1, 1990. Three hours before he was scheduled to be transferred to a prison in Boron, California on January 31, 1990, the former governor killed himself in Hagåtña by wrapping himself in a flag of Guam, chaining himself to a statue of Chief Kepuha (also Quipuha, Guam's first native chief to convert to Roman Catholicism) located along Marine Corps Drive (the island's primary thoroughfare), and shooting himself in the head with a .38 caliber pistol. He had set up four placards around the monument, one of which paraphrased the last words of Nathan Hale: "I regret that I only have one life to give to my island."

Bordallo died of massive brain damage at 4:28 P.M. at Naval Hospital, aged 62. He was buried at Pigo Cemetery in western Hagåtña.

=== Honors ===
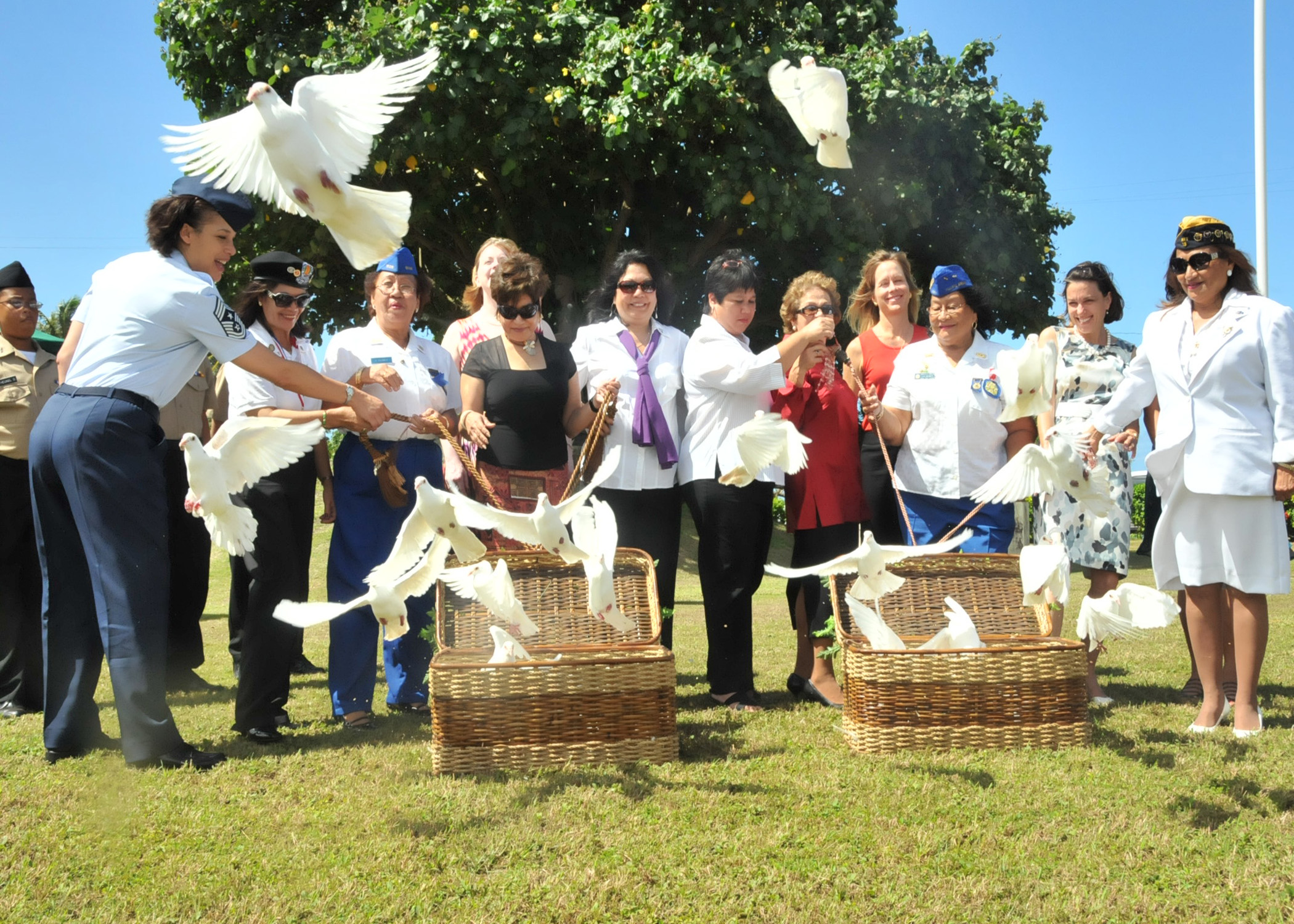
ADELUP, Guam (November 11, 2011). Dignitaries release "Freedom Birds" during a Veterans Day ceremony at the Ricardo J. Bordallo Governor's Complex (U.S. Navy photo by JoAnna Delfin/Released).

In January 1997, the territorial administration facility was officially named as Ricardo J. Bordallo Governor's Complex in his honor.

== Electoral history ==
1970 Guam gubernatorial general election results
Party	Candidate	Votes	%
Republican	Carlos G. Camacho/Kurt S. Moylan	11,396	55.80%
Democratic	Ricardo J. Bordallo/Richard F. Taitano	9,028	44.20%

1974 Democratic gubernatorial primary results
Party	Candidate	Votes	%
Democratic	Ricardo J. Bordallo/Rudolph G. Sablan	4,435	49.75%
Democratic	Pedro C. Sanchez/Esteban U. Torres	1,756	19.70%
Democratic	Manuel F.L. Guerrero/David D.L. Flores	1,469	16.48%
Democratic	Joaquin C. Arriola/Theodore "Ted" S. Nelson	1,254	14.07%

1974 Guam gubernatorial general election results (November 4, 1974)
Party	Candidate	Votes	%
Republican	Carlos G. Camacho/Kurt S. Moylan	8,830	39.52%
Democratic	Ricardo J. Bordallo/Rudolph G. Sablan	7,203	32.24%
Independent	Paul M. Calvo/Antonio M. Palomo (write-in)	6,311	28.25%

1974 Guam gubernatorial general election results in runoff (November 19, 1974)
Party	Candidate	Votes	%
Democratic	Ricardo J. Bordallo/Rudolph G. Sablan	11,441	51.41%
Republican	Carlos G. Camacho/Kurt S. Moylan	10,814	48.59%

1978 Guam gubernatorial general election results
Party	Candidate	Votes	%
Republican	Paul M. Calvo/Joseph F. Ada	13,649	52.12%
Democratic	Ricardo J. Bordallo/Pedro C. Sanchez	12,540	47.88%

1982 Guam gubernatorial general election results
Party	Candidate	Votes	%
Democratic	Ricardo J. Bordallo/Edward Diego Reyes	15,199	52.42%
Republican	Paul M. Calvo/Peter F. Perez Jr.	13,797	47.58%

1986 Guam gubernatorial general election results
Party	Candidate	Votes	%
Republican	Joseph F. Ada/Frank F. Blas	18,325	53.79%
Democratic	Ricardo J. Bordallo/Edward Diego Reyes	15,744	46.21%

Party political offices
New office	Chair of the Guam Democratic Party; 1961–1963	Succeeded by Adrian Cristobal
First	Democratic nominee for Governor of Guam; 1970, 1974, 1978, 1982, 1986	Succeeded by Madeleine Bordallo
Preceded by Joaquin Perez	Chair of the Guam Democratic Party; 1971–1973	Succeeded by Francisco Carbullido
Political offices
Preceded by Carlos Camacho	Governor of Guam; 1975–1979; 1983–1987	Succeeded by Paul McDonald Calvo
Preceded by Paul McDonald Calvo	Governor of Guam; 1975–1979; 1983–1987	Succeeded by Joseph Franklin Ada
