= Edward Diego Reyes =

Guamanian politician

4th Lieutenant Governor of Guam
- In office January 3, 1983 – January 5, 1987
- Governor: Ricardo Bordallo
- Preceded by: Joseph F. Ada
- Succeeded by: Frank Blas

Member of the Guam Legislature
- In office January 4, 1993 – January 2, 1995
- In office January 2, 1989 – January 7, 1991

Personal details
- Born: January 24, 1930 Hagåtña, Guam
- Died: April 14, 2018 (aged 88) Honolulu, Hawaii, U.S.
- Party: Democratic
- Spouse: Guadalupe Cruz
- Children: 3 (1 deceased)

Edward Diego "Eddie" Reyes (January 24, 1930 – April 14, 2018) was a Guamanian politician and retired United States Air Force colonel. Reyes served as the fourth lieutenant governor of Guam from January 3, 1983, to January 5, 1987, under Governor Ricardo Bordallo, having been elected in 1982 as Bordallo's running mate.

== Early life ==
He was born on January 24, 1930, to his parents Juan Reyes and Ana Guevara.

== Political career ==
=== 1978 Borallo-Reyes Campaign ===
In 1978, incumbent Guam Governor Ricardo Bordallo, a Democrat, lost re-election to Republican Paul McDonald Calvo. Four years later, Bordallo, who planned a political comeback, once again announced his candidacy for Governor. Bordallo chose U.S. Air Force Colonel Edward Diego Reyes, a political unknown with no previous experience in elected office as his running mate. Reyes, a Vietnam War veteran with several awards and honors, retired from the U.S. Air Force following a 28-year career in order to enter the race with Bordallo.

=== 1982 Borallo-Reyes Campaign ===
Bordallo and Reyes were challenged in the 1982 Democratic gubernatorial primary by Bordallo's former Lt. Governor Rudy Sablan and his running mate, Joe Leon Guerrero. However, Bordallo-Reyes easily defeated Sablan in the primary election by 35 percent.

Bordallo and Reyes' campaign utilized the "People First" slogan in the general election campaign against Governor Paul McDonald Calvo. The Bordallo-Reyes defeated incumbent Governor Calvo and his running mate, Peter F. Perez Jr., in the 1982 general election. Bordallo won the race 1,402 votes (approximately 5%) out 28,996 votes cast. Bordallo and Reyes were sworn in as Governor and Lt. Governor on January 3, 1983.

=== 1986 Borallo-Reyes Campaign ===
Bordallo and Reyes sought re-election to a second term in 1986. However, Governor Bordallo was indicted in September 1986 on eleven counts of corruption. Lt. Governor Reyes, who continued to support Bordallo as his running mate, was not implicated in the scandal and emerged from it with his reputation unscathed. However, the chances that Bordallo-Reyes ticket would be re-elected were severely diminished by Bordallo's indictment.

Bordallo-Reyes lost re-election to Republican Joseph Franklin Ada and his running mate, Frank Blas, in the general election on November 4, 1986. Ada defeated Governor Bordallo by 2,581 votes (7.6%).

=== Guam Legislature ===
Reyes served in the 20th and the 22nd Guam Legislatures.

=== 1994 Reyes-Nelson Campaign ===
In 1994, Reyes unsuccessfully ran for Governor of Guam, choosing Gloria Nelson as his running mate for Lt. Governor.

== Personal life and death ==
Reyes was married to Guadalupe "Lupe" Cruz and has four children (Johnny, Paul, Barbara and Lauren).

Reyes died on April 14, 2018, in a hospital in Honolulu, Hawaii.

Party political offices
Preceded by Pedro C. Sanchez	Democratic nominee for Lieutenant Governor of Guam; 1982, 1986	Succeeded by Jose A.R. Duenas
Political offices
Preceded by Joseph Franklin Ada	Lieutenant Governor of Guam; 1983–1987	Succeeded by Frank Blas
