= 2014 Guamanian gubernatorial election =

- November 4, 2014
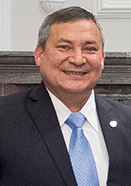

Nominee	Eddie Calvo	Carl Gutierrez
Party	Republican	Democratic
Running mate	Ray Tenorio	Gary Gumataotao
Popular vote	22,512	12,712
Percentage	63.70%	35.97%
- Results by village Calvo: 50–60% 60–70% 70–80%
Governor before election
Eddie Calvo
Republican
Elected Governor
Eddie Calvo
Republican

The 2014 Guam gubernatorial election took place on November 4, 2014, to elect the governor of Guam. Incumbent Republican governor Eddie Calvo, who was elected in 2010, sought re-election for a second four-year term. The Governor and Lieutenant Governor of Guam are elected on the same ticket.

Calvo won the election with 64 percent of the vote, defeating Gutierrez. This was the last time a Republican won the governorship of Guam until the 2026 Guam gubernatorial election.

== Background ==
The 2014 gubernatorial race was essentially a rematch of the 2010 gubernatorial election. In 2010, Eddie Calvo, a Republican, defeated the Democratic nominee, former governor Carl Gutierrez (1995–2003), with 50.61% of the vote. Calvo took office in January 2011.

Governor Eddie Calvo and Lt. Governor Ray Tenorio announced their intention to seek re-election for a second, four-year term. The team held the first official rally to kickoff their campaign on June 7, 2014, at their campaign headquarters in Anigua, following a motorcade of supporters from Yigo.

In contrast to the Republicans, the Democratic Party of Guam was initially unable to find a candidate willing to run against Governor Calvo in the 2014 contest. Noting the lack of a nominee, former governor Carl Gutierrez, who initially declined to enter the election, announced his intention to run for governor on June 26, 2014, just days before the July 1 filing deadline. Gutierrez chose Gary Gumataotao, an attorney, as his running mate. Gutierrez and Gumataotao filed their candidacy papers on June 30, 2014, followed by a campaign rally in Hagåtña.

== Candidates ==
=== Republican candidate ===
- Eddie Calvo, incumbent governor of Guam (since 2011)
  - Running mate: Ray Tenorio, incumbent lieutenant governor of Guam (since 2011)

=== Democratic candidate ===
- Carl Gutierrez, former governor of Guam (1995–2003), 2010 Democratic gubernatorial nominee.
  - Running mate: Gary Gumataotao, attorney

== Endorsements ==
Former First Lady of Guam Joanne Camacho (2003–2011), a Republican and former General Manager of the Guam Visitors Bureau, endorsed Gutierrez for governor in the election. Rumors of a potential split in the Republican Party of Guam between factions loyal to either Governor Calvo or former governor Felix Perez Camacho spread following her endorsement.

== Results ==
=== Primary election ===
Democratic Party of Guam primary results
Party	Candidate	Votes	%
Democratic	Carl T.C. Gutierrez and Gary W.F. Gumataotao	7,330	98.14
Total votes		7,330	100

Republican Party of Guam primary results
Party	Candidate	Votes	%
Republican	Eddie B. Calvo and Ray Tenorio	11,034	99.36
Total votes		11,034	100

=== General election ===
2014 Guam gubernatorial election
Party	Candidate	Votes	%	±%
Republican	Eddie B. Calvo/Ray Tenorio (incumbent)	22,512	63.70%	+13.09%
Democratic	Carl T.C. Gutierrez/Gary W.F. Gumataotao	12,712	35.97%	−13.42%
n/a	Write-ins	117	0.33%	N/A
Total votes		'35,341'	'100.0%'	N/A
Republican hold				
