= Kaleo Moylan =

Guamanian politician and businessman

7th Lieutenant Governor of Guam
- In office January 6, 2003 – January 1, 2007
- Governor: Felix Perez Camacho
- Preceded by: Madeleine Bordallo
- Succeeded by: Michael Cruz

Member of the Guam Legislature
- In office January 4, 1999 – January 6, 2003

Personal details
- Born: Kaleo Scott Moylan; October 29, 1966 (age 60) Guam
- Party: Republican
- Relatives: Kurt Moylan (father); Scotty Moylan (grandfather)

Kaleo Scott Moylan (born October 29, 1966) is a Guamanian politician and businessman who served as the seventh lieutenant governor of Guam from January 6, 2003 to January 1, 2007. He is a member of the Republican Party of Guam.

== Biography ==
He attended George Washington High School in Mangilao, Guam and graduated in 1984. Before 2003, Moylan was a senator in the Guam Legislature. A member of the Republican Party, he is the son of the first elected Lieutenant Governor, Kurt Moylan, a founding member of the Republican Party of Guam, and the grandson of the businessman, Scotty Moylan.

=== Moylan-Santos campaign (2006) ===
Moylan declared his candidacy for the 2006 gubernatorial election and was a candidate in the September 2006 Republican primary. His running mate for Lt. Governor was Democratic Senator Francis E. Santos. The Moylan-Santos team faced the incumbent governor Felix Perez Camacho and Senator Dr. Michael Cruz. He defeated his main Republican rival, for the Moylan-Santos team in the primary election on September 2, 2006, when their taking over Camacho-Cruz team.

== See also ==
- List of minority governors and lieutenant governors in the United States

Party political offices
Preceded by Felix Perez Camacho	Republican nominee for Lieutenant Governor of Guam; 2002	Succeeded by Michael Cruz
Political offices
Preceded by Madeleine Z. Bordallo	Lieutenant Governor of Guam; 2003–2007	Succeeded by Michael W. Cruz
