= Rose Baza Calvo =

Guamanian First Lady of Guam

First Lady of Guam
- In role January 1, 1979 – January 3, 1983
- Governor: Paul McDonald Calvo

Personal details
- Party: Republican
- Spouse: Paul McDonald Calvo
- Children: 8
- Relatives: Eddie Baza Calvo (son)
- Occupation: First Lady of Guam
- Other names: Rose Calvo, Rose B. Calvo, Rose H. B. Calvo, Rose Herrero Baza Calvo, Rosa Baza, Rosa Herrero Baza

Rose Baza Calvo is a Guamanian former First Lady of Guam from 1979 to 1983.

== Career ==
In November 1978, when Paul McDonald Calvo won the election as the Governor of Guam, Calvo became the First Lady of Guam. Calvo served as First Lady of Guam on January 1, 1979, until January 3, 1983.

The Calvo family owns and operates Calvo's Enterprises and numerous other businesses in Guam.

== Personal life ==
Calvo's full name is Rose Herrero Baza Calvo.

Calvo's husband was Paul McDonald Calvo, a politician and 3rd Governor of Guam. They have eight children, Vera, Kathy, Paul, Eddie, Barbara, Marie, Reyna and Clare. Calvo and her family lived in Maite, Guam. Their son, Eddie Baza Calvo, became the 8th Governor of Guam.
