= Lourdes Perez Camacho =

Guamanian medical technologist and First Lady of Guam

First Lady of Guam
- In role July 1, 1969 – January 4, 1971
- Governor: Carlos Camacho
- In role January 4, 1971 – January 6, 1975
- Governor: Carlos Camacho

Personal details
- Born: Lourdes Duenas Perez; September 23, 1929 (age 95); Tamuning, Guam
- Political party: Republican
- Spouse: Carlos Camacho
- Children: 7
- Parents: Jesus Flores Perez (father); Margarita Duenas Perez (mother)
- Relatives: Felix Perez Camacho (son), Mary Camacho Torres (daughter)
- Occupation: Medical Technologist, First Lady of Guam
- Other names: Lourdes Camacho, Lourdes P. Camacho, Lourdes Duenas Perez

Lourdes Perez Camacho (born September 23, 1929) is a Guamanian Medical Technologist and former First Lady of Guam from 1969 to 1975.

== Early life ==
On September 23, 1929, Camacho was born as Lourdes Duenas Perez in Tamuning, Guam. Camacho's father was Jesus Flores Perez. Camacho's mother was Margarita Duenas Perez. In 1947, Camacho graduated from Georgia Washington High School.

== Education ==
In 1954, Camacho earned a Bachelor of Science degree in biology from Mercy College of Detroit in Detroit, Michigan.

== Career ==
After Catholic Medical Center in Guam opened in July 1955, Camacho became its first Medical Technologist.

In 1969, when Carlos Camacho was appointed by President Richard Nixon as the Governor of Guam, Camacho became the First Lady of Guam on July 1, 1969, until January 4, 1971.

In 1970, Camacho established the American Cancer Society Guam.

In November 1970, when Carlos Camacho won the election as the Governor of Guam, Calvo became the First Lady of Guam. Camacho served as First Lady of Guam on January 4, 1971, until January 6, 1975.

== Personal life ==
Camacho's husband was Carlos Camacho, a dentist, politician, last appointed Governor of Guam, and first elected Governor of Guam. They have seven children. Camacho's son Felix Perez Camacho became the 7th Governor of Guam. Camacho's only daughter Mary Camacho Torres became a senator in the Guam Legislature. Camacho's other children are Carlos, Thomas, Ricardo, Francis and Victor.

In September 2021, the Guam Legislatures Resolution No. 167-36 (COR) introduced by Amanda L. Shelton celebrated Camacho's 92nd birthday.
