= Michael Cruz =

Guamanian politician

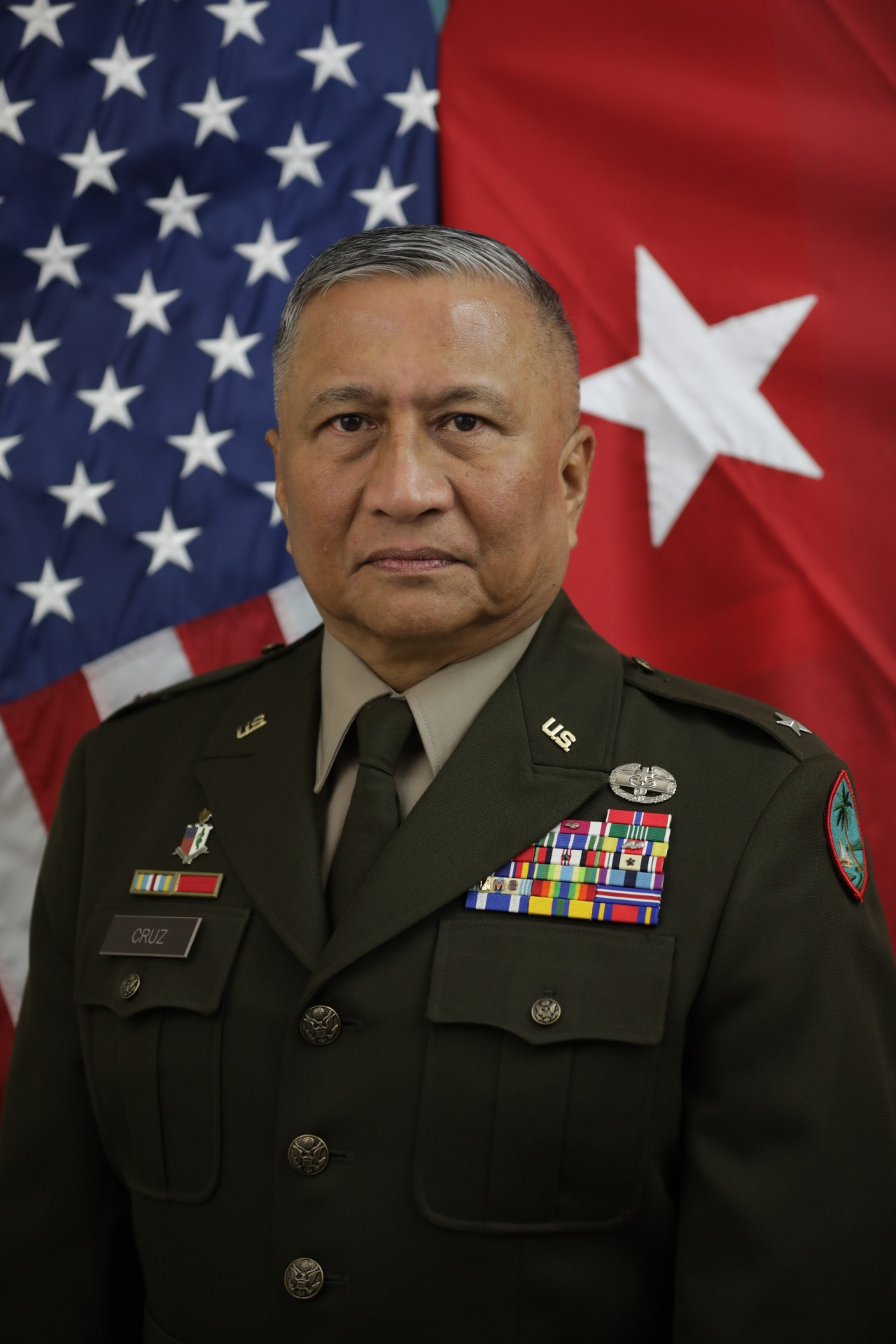
- Official portrait, 2024

8th Lieutenant Governor of Guam
- In office January 1, 2007 – January 3, 2011
- Governor: Felix Perez Camacho
- Preceded by: Kaleo Moylan
- Succeeded by: Ray Tenorio

Senator of the Guam Legislature
- In office January 3, 2005 – January 1, 2007

Personal details
- Born: Michael Warren Cruz; September 8, 1958 (age 67) Guam
- Party: Republican
- Spouse: Jennifer Rosario Cruz
- Children: 6
- Profession: Surgeon, politician

Michael Warren Cruz (born September 8, 1958) is a Guamanian surgeon and former politician who served as the eighth lieutenant governor of Guam from January 1, 2007 to January 3, 2011. In 2023, he was appointed adjutant general of the Guam National Guard.

== Biography ==
=== Personal life ===
Cruz was born on September 8, 1958, a son of Miguel de Gracia Cruz and Rosalinda Quinata. His father was Chamorro while his mother was Filipino.

He has three children from his first marriage: Shaunn, Mika’ele and Christine. Cruz is currently married to his second wife, Jennifer Rosario Cruz. The couple have two daughters, Taylor & Bella, as well as Rosario Cruz's son, Christian, from her previous relationship.

Cruz received a bachelor's degree in biology from Walla Walla College in Washington state. He obtained a Doctor of Medicine from Loma Linda University in California.

=== Military ===
Cruz is a colonel in the Guam Army National Guard. He is a veteran of Operation Desert Storm. Cruz volunteered as a commander in the Rapid Advanced Medical Team during the Iraq War, serving from 2003 to 2004. He was a recipient of the Bronze Star Medal for his tour of duty in Iraq.

In March 2023, the governor of Guam appointed Cruz as adjutant general of Guam's National Guard.

=== Medical career ===
Cruz is a surgeon, and served as the medical director of the Guam Memorial Hospital. He is a member of the American Board of Surgery, and the American Society of Breast Surgeons, and a Fellow of the American College of Surgeons.

=== Political career ===
Cruz was elected as a Republican Senator in the 28th Guamanian Legislature from 2005 to 2006. He served on the legislature's Health and Human Services Committee, authoring legislation to combat childhood obesity in Guam.

He was elected Lieutenant Governor of Guam in November 2006 as the running mate of Governor Felix Perez Camacho. Cruz took office on January 1, 2007.

=== Cruz-Espaldon Campaign ===
Cruz declared his candidacy for the 2010 gubernatorial election and was a candidate in the September 2010 Republican primary. His running mate for lieutenant governor was Senator Jim Espaldon. Cruz was defeated by Eddie Baza Calvo in the Republican primary election on September 3, 2010.

== See also ==
- Carlotta A. Leon Guerrero

Political offices
Preceded by Kaleo Moylan	Lieutenant Governor of Guam; 2007–2011	Succeeded by Ray Tenorio
Party political offices
Preceded by Kaleo Moylan	Republican nominee for Lieutenant Governor of Guam; 2006	Succeeded by Ray Tenorio
