= Monitor House =

Historic house in Ohio, United States

- U.S. National Register of Historic Places
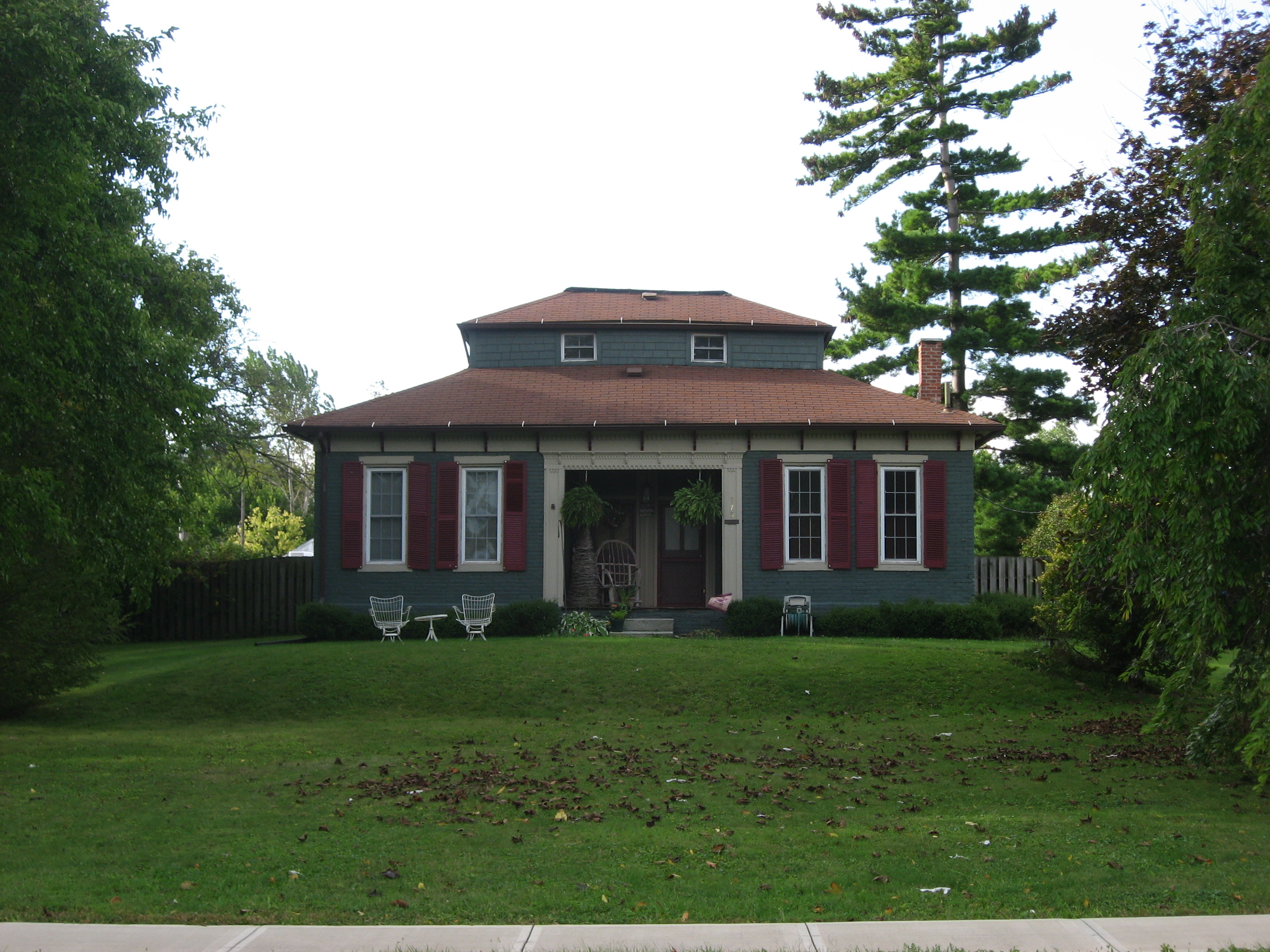
- Front of the house

- Location within Ohio Location within the United States
- Location: 375 W. Main St., St. Paris, Ohio
- Coordinates: 40°7′46″N 83°58′2″W
- Area: 1.5 acres (0.61 ha)
- Built: 1860
- Architectural style: Monitor Style
- NRHP reference No.: 74001408
- Added to NRHP: May 2, 1974

The Monitor House is a historic house in St. Paris, Ohio, United States. Located along West Main Street, it is a square brick structure resting on a foundation of stone and covered with an asphalt roof. Although the house is primarily one story tall, it is built around a 1 1/2-story square clerestory.

The house was constructed circa 1860, although its precise date of erection — as well as the names of its first owner and its designer — is unknown. Its five-bay, 30-foot (9.1 m)-long exterior is decorated with cornices around the window lintels. Inside, the rooms open onto a central hallway that concludes with a stairway to the second floor of the central part of the house.

In 1974, the Monitor House was listed on the National Register of Historic Places because of its unusual architecture. Only two or three monitor houses, featuring an elevated center, are known to exist in Ohio, and the one in St. Paris is architecturally the most well-preserved; consequently, it is considered historically significant statewide. In contrast, a similar monitor house in Chillicothe, known as "Tanglewood," is only considered locally significant. The house in St. Paris was the first of over thirty places in Champaign County to be listed on the National Register; it is one of two in the village with this distinction, along with the Kiser Mansion on East Main Street.

== See also ==
- Josiah Quincy House, a monitor house in Massachusetts
