= Senator Aguon =

Senator Aguon may refer to:

- Frank Aguon (born 1966), Senate of Guam
- John P. Aguon (fl. 1980s-1990s), Senate of Guam
