= Ray Tenorio =

American-Guamanian politician

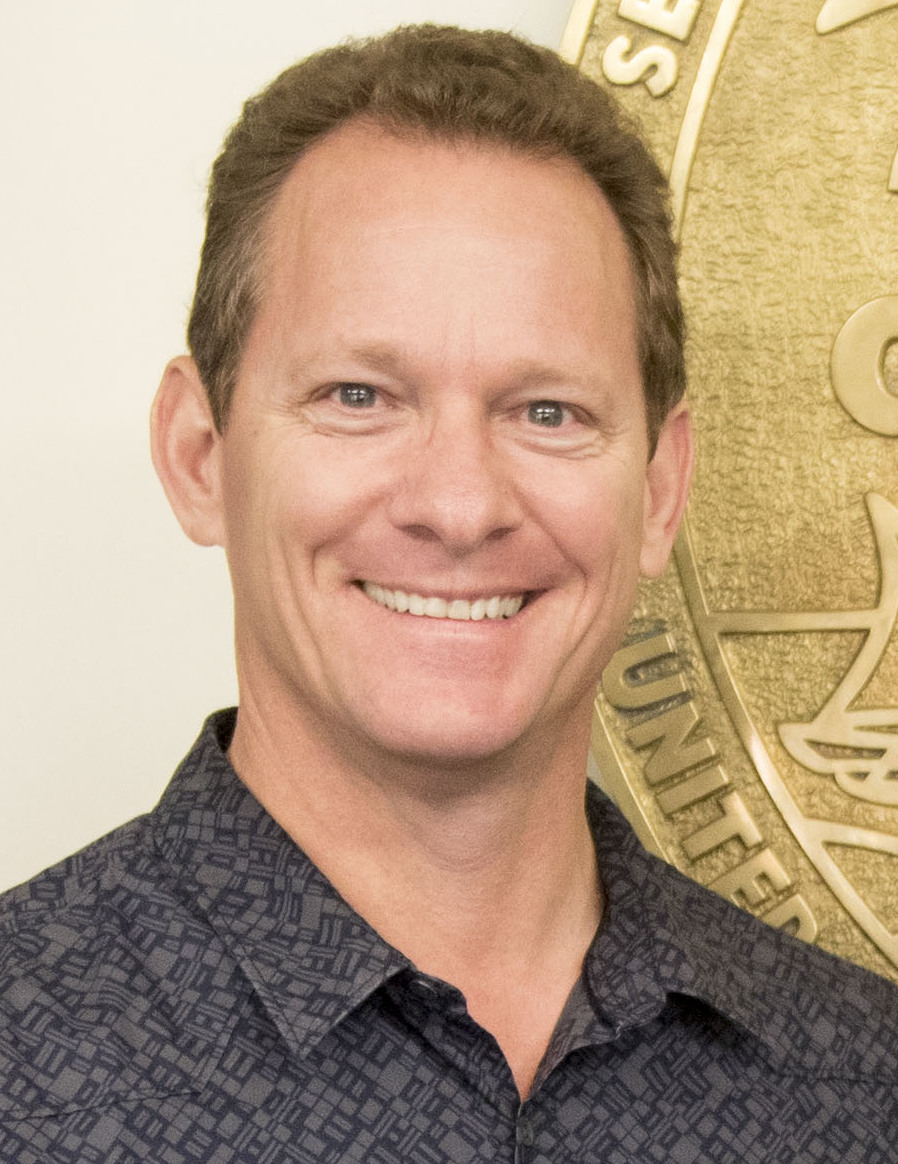
- Tenorio in 2017

9th Lieutenant Governor of Guam
- In office January 3, 2011 – January 7, 2019
- Governor: Eddie Calvo
- Preceded by: Michael Cruz
- Succeeded by: Josh Tenorio

Senator of the Guam Legislature
- In office January 6, 2003 – January 3, 2011

Personal details
- Born: Raymond Stanley Tenorio; February 8, 1965 (age 60); Orlando, Florida, U.S.
- Political party: Republican
- Spouse: Madoka Hosotani
- Children: 5
- Education: Guam Community College; University of Guam (BA, MPA)

Raymond Stanley Tenorio (born February 8, 1965) is an American-Guamanian politician and former police officer of the Guam Police Department who served as the ninth lieutenant governor of Guam from January 3, 2011, to January 7, 2019. Tenorio is a Republican and served as a Senator in the Legislature of Guam from January 6, 2003, until January 3, 2011. He unsuccessfully ran for governor of Guam, losing to Democrat Lou Leon Guerrero in the 2018 gubernatorial election.

== Early life and education ==
Tenorio was born on February 8, 1965, in Orlando, Florida. He was raised in Orlando by his birth father until he was sent to live in a foster home. His mother, then Helen V. Eubank (1944–2016), located him at a foster home in Tennessee. She married Romeo Mantanona Tenorio (1943–2000) and brought Ray with her to Guam when he was approximately ten years old.

Tenorio graduated from George Washington High School on Guam in 1983. He earned a Criminal Justice Academy certificate from Guam Community College in 1984. Tenorio received a bachelor's degree in public administration from the University of Guam in 2000 and a master's degree, also in public administration, from the University of Guam in July 2011.

== Career ==
Tenorio served as a police officer in the Guam Police Department for fourteen years. He has also worked as the president of Trace Investigation Inc. and Denanche Security Agency.

=== Guam Legislature ===
Tenorio was first elected to be Senator in the Guam Legislature in the November 2002 election. He garnered the highest votes in both 2002 and 2004 elections. Tenorio first swore an oath as Senator in January 2003 to become a member of the 27th Guam Legislature and served four consecutive terms, including the 28th, 29th and 30th Guam Legislatures, before becoming Lt. Governor in 2011.

=== Lt. Governor of Guam ===
Republican gubernatorial candidate and Minority Leader Eddie Calvo chose Tenorio as his running mate for Lieutenant Governor of Guam in the 2010 gubernatorial election. Calvo and Tenorio defeated their Republican opponents, Lt. Governor Michael Cruz and running mate James Espaldon, in the Republican primary election on September 3, 2010. The Republican ticket of Eddie Calvo and Ray Tenorio narrowly won the 2010 Guam gubernatorial election by approximately 500 votes over the Democratic ticket of former Governor Carl Gutierrez and Frank Aguon. Calvo and Tenorio were sworn into office on January 3, 2011, at the Plaza de España in Hagåtña. Their opponents, Gutierrez and Aguon, filed an unsuccessful lawsuit challenging the results and asking the courts to order a new gubernatorial election.

=== 2018 gubernatorial candidacy ===
In January 2018, incumbent Lt. Governor Ray Tenorio officially announced his candidacy to be the next Governor of Guam. Tenorio selected former senator V. Anthony "Tony" Ada to be his running mate for the upcoming Republican primaries. The Tenorio/Ada ticket ran unopposed for the Republican primary but lost the general election to Democrat Lou Leon Guerrero.

== Personal life ==
Tenorio is married to Madoka Hosotani Tenorio and they reside in Yigo, Guam. He has five children - LaDonna, Nicole, Raymond Jr., Rome Scott and Richard. He also has many grandchildren. Tenorio was an avid World of Warcraft player.

== Legislative history ==
=== 30th Guam Legislature (2009–2011) ===
- Assistant Minority Leader
- Vice Chairman, Committee on Public Safety, Law Enforcement & Senior Citizens
- Member, Committee on Education
- Member, Committee on Tourism, Cultural Affairs, Public Broadcasting and Youth
- Member, Committee on Municipal Affairs, Aviation, Housing & Recreation
- Member, Committee on the Guam Military Buildup and Homeland Security
- Member, Committee on Utilities, Transportation, Public Works & Veterans Affairs
- Member, Committee on Labor, Public Structure, Public Libraries & Technology
- Member, Committee on Economic Development, Health & Human Services and Judiciary

=== 29th Guam Legislature (2007–2009) ===
- Acting Speaker
- Vice Speaker
- Legislative Secretary
- Chairman, Committee on Criminal Justice, Public Safety and Youth
- Member, Executive Committee
- Member, Committee on Aviation, Federal Affairs, Labor, Housing, Banking and Insurance
- Member, Committee on Tourism, Maritime, Military, Veterans and Foreign Affairs
- Member, Committee on Education, General & Omnibus Affairs
- Member, Committee on Finance, Taxation, Commerce & Economic Development

=== 28th Guam Legislature (2005–2007) ===
- Majority Leader
- Chairman, Committee on Criminal Justice, Public Safety and Youth & Foreign Affairs
- Vice Chairman, Committee on Education & Community Development
- Member, Committee on Finance, Taxation & Commerce
- Member, Committee on Health & Human Services
- Member, Committee on Natural Resources, Utilities & Micronesian Affairs
- Member, Committee on Aviation, Immigration, Labor & Housing
- Member, Committee on Judiciary, Governmental Operations & Reorganization
- Member, Committee on General and Omnibus Matters

=== 27th Guam Legislature (2003–2005) ===
- Minority Whip
- Member, Committee on Utilities & Land
- Member, Committee on Health
- Member, Subcommittee on Restoration of the Guam Legislature Building
- President, Trace Investigations, Inc., 1997–2002
- President, Denanche Security Agency, 1995–2002
- Police Officer, Guam Police Department, 1984–1997

Political offices
Preceded by Michael Cruz	Lieutenant Governor of Guam; 2011–2019	Succeeded by Josh Tenorio
Party political offices
Preceded by Michael Cruz	Republican nominee for Lieutenant Governor of Guam; 2010, 2014	Succeeded by Tony Ada
Preceded by Eddie Baza Calvo	Republican nominee for Governor of Guam; 2018	Succeeded by Felix Camacho
