= Gloria Nelson =

Civil servant in Guam

Gloria Camacho Borja Nelson (1935–2012) was a community leader and civil servant in Guam.

== Biography ==
Nelson was the director of Guam's Department of Education. She was an officer of the Democratic Party of Guam, and chairperson of the Guam Election Commission.

Nelson campaigned for 13 years for the government of Guam to pay a cost of living adjustment to retirees.
