= Joseph Franklin Ada =

Governor of Guam from 1987 to 1995

Joseph Ada
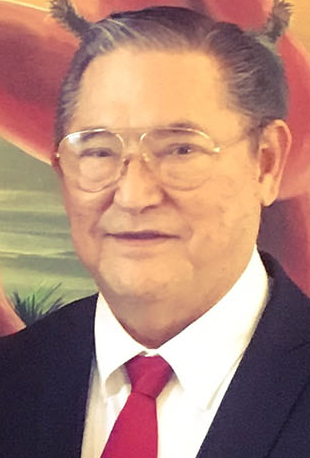
- Ada in 2018

5th Governor of Guam
- In office January 5, 1987 – January 2, 1995
- Lieutenant: Frank Blas
- Preceded by: Ricardo Bordallo
- Succeeded by: Carl Gutierrez

3rd Lieutenant Governor of Guam
- In office January 1, 1979 – January 3, 1983
- Governor: Paul McDonald Calvo
- Preceded by: Rudy Sablan
- Succeeded by: Edward Diego Reyes

Speaker of the Guam Legislature
- In office January 6, 1975 – January 3, 1979
- Preceded by: Florencio Ramirez
- Succeeded by: Tommy Tanaka

Member of the Guam Legislature
- In office January 6, 1975 – January 3, 1979
- In office January 3, 1983 – January 5, 1987

Personal details
- Born: Joseph Franklin Ada; December 3, 1943 (age 82) Tamuning, Guam
- Party: Republican
- Spouse: Rosanne Santos (m. 1968; died 2021)
- Children: 3
- Education: University of Guam (attended); University of Portland (BS)

Joseph Franklin Ada (born December 3, 1943) is a Guamanian politician who served as the fifth governor of Guam from 1987 to 1995. Before his accession to the governorship, Ada previously served as the third Lieutenant Governor of Guam from 1979 to 1983. He is a member of the Republican Party of Guam. He is the member of the Guam Legislature as the lead speaker from 1975 to 1979 and member as the senator from 1975 to 1979 and again from 1983 to 1987.

== Early life ==
Ada was born in Tamuning, Guam, to José "Ping" Torres Ada (1915–1984) and Regina San Nicolas Herrero (1921–2009). He attended the College of Guam for two years before entering the University of Portland, where he graduated with a bachelor's degree in corporate finance in 1968. Ada's late grandfather Josef Martinez Ada who owned Ada's Soap Factory in Anigua from the early 1930s until his grandfather's death in 1955.

Ada is married to Rosanne Jacqueline Santos and has three children, Eric Ada, Tricia Yoo, and Ester Dela Paz, and has five grandchildren. His wife died on March 18, 2021.

== Political career before the Ada-Blas Administration ==
=== Guam Legislature ===
Ada's public career began under Governor Carlos G. Camacho, who appointed him deputy director of the Department of Public Works in 1970. Ada, who had just turned 27 at the time, remained as Public Works deputy director until 1972, when he resigned to make his first bid for elected office. He won a seat in the 12th Guam Legislature as a member of the Republican minority at the age of 28. In the election for the 13th Guam Legislature, the Republicans were swept into the majority and Ada was the overall top vote getter. His colleagues chose him to be Speaker of the 13th Guam Legislature at the age of 31. Ada was a top vote getter again in the 14th Guam Legislature and was again chosen as Speaker.

Ada never forgot what Camacho did for him by offering Ada that first leadership position. He followed Camacho's example after he became governor, offering cabinet positions to bright young people, many who became leaders in their own right.

During his term as speaker, Ada, a strong advocate of education, established priorities that would remain important to him in the years to come. He cosponsored a bill that created the Guam Community College and made a substantial investment in vocational education. As Speaker, he also pushed for additional funding for recreation and sports programs especially for Guam's youth.

Ada led the fight to prevent massive personnel lay offs at Guam's Ship Repair Facility (SRF) in the mid-1970s. He traveled to Washington, D.C., and presented Guam's case to forestall the closure of SRF, saving hundreds of local jobs. Twenty years later the shipyard was privatized but the jobs were still there.

=== Lieutenant governor ===
In the election of 1978 Ada was asked by Sen. Paul Calvo to join him as his running mate for the Republican nomination as Governor and Lieutenant Governor of Guam. The two won the election and Ada, now 35, became the Lt. Governor of Guam. Believing strongly that the future of the region depended on unspoiled ocean resources and fisheries, Ada led the fight to stop both the United States and Japan from dumping nuclear and chemical wastes into the Pacific Ocean. He presented the Pacific case in Washington and in Tokyo and helped stop the plan for ocean dumping of nuclear waste.

Ada declined to run for a second term with Calvo in 1982 and chose instead to return to the legislature. Topping the polls again, he was elected to the 17th and 18th Guam Legislatures in 1982 and 1984. The Republicans, however, were in the minority during these terms and it was difficult to make progress. Ada then decided to run for governor.

=== Ada-Blas Campaign (1986) ===
His running mate and lieutenant governor was former senator Frank Blas. Ada served numerous terms in the Guam Legislature, becoming the first Republican speaker of the legislature when the Republicans captured control of the body from the Democratic Party. Ada was elected Lt. Governor of Guam with running mate Paul McDonald Calvo in 1978, but declined the opportunity to serve as Calvo's running mate for re-election in 1982 and instead returned to the legislature. Calvo lost the subsequent election to Ricky Bordallo. Ada is the only Guam political leader to serve as Speaker, lieutenant governor and governor. He stewarded Guam's economic expansion and pushed, successfully, for return of land held by the US military.

== Governorship ==
=== First term ===
When Ada began his first term Guam was in the throes of an economic recession with the government suffering under a crushing deficit. Ada put all his administration's efforts toward Guam's economic recovery, and eventually he presided over one of the fastest growing and strongest economies in the island's history due in part to a growth in tourism from a booming Japanese economy. He launched an austerity program at the start of his term and followed it with a program to encourage investment and trade from Asia. He eliminated the government deficit in three years. Despite a decrease in federal spending, Guam's economy doubled and some 25,000 new jobs were created. A majority of these jobs were in Guam's growing private sector. During Ada's first term, private sector employment outstripped public sector employment in Guam's economy for the first time in the modern era.

As chairperson of the Commission on Self-Determination, established in 1980 to lead the way toward determining a new political status for Guam, Ada presided over the completion of the Guam Commonwealth Act and presented to the people of Guam for approval in a plebiscite. Upon the Act's approval, Ada took it to US Congress. A strong advocate for self-government and self-determination for Guam, he called for an end to Guam's colonial status and pushed for the liberation of Guam's economy from federal regulations. Congress, however, did not act on the Guam Commonwealth Act and Guam's political status remains unresolved. Ada believed that Guam needed to be financially healthy and not dependent on the US government in order to move forward politically. He said the federal government has tied Guam's hands more than once pointing to postwar security clearance, federal land takings for US bases and the Jones Act which puts Guam at a financial disadvantage for shipping.

To address those concerns Ada said he supported the newly developed qualifying certificate program at the Guam Economic Development Authority to bring in foreign investment, pushed for good fuel rates and port lease fees to bring tuna transshipment to Guam, and worked on getting a visa waiver for visitors to Guam from Korea and Taiwan, all of which helped move Guam away from being dependent on US federal dollars. He also directed floating the first bond for infrastructure rather than ask for more federal funds.

=== Ada-Blas Campaign (1990) ===
He was the first governor of Guam to be reelected to a consecutive term in office, after winning reelection in 1990, but the Democrats were defeated in the general election by the Bordallo-Duenas team on November 6, 1990, with their Senators Madeleine Bordallo and Ping Duenas upon the current governor Ada.

=== Second term ===
In his second term Ada capitalized on the fruits of his economic recovery program and made the largest investment in education in Guam up to that time. He directed the floating of a bond which made some $170 million available for the construction of a new high school in southern Guam (now Guam Southern High School), new elementary schools in Tamuning, Inarajan and Dededo, and reconstruction of schools in Upi and Ordot-Chalan Pago. Additionally many new classrooms were built to relieve overcrowding in schools around the island. Operating budgets for the public schools were increased annually. Under Ada computers and computer classes were introduced in all Guam schools. At the end of his term every grade level in every school had access to computer classes.

Guam suffered from a string of natural disasters during the second Ada administration. Four sequential typhoons affected the area in 1991, with Typhoon Omar causing the most damage. The 7.8 Mw Guam earthquake occurred on August 8, 1993, with a maximum Mercalli intensity of IX (Violent). Damage ran into millions of dollars though only two buildings were destroyed. These disasters, combined with a recession in Japan, caused the tourism industry to suffer for a time.

== Public life after the Ada-Blas Administration ==
=== Ada-Camacho Campaign (1998) ===
When his second term was over, he once again ran for governor in 1998, with then Sen. Felix Camacho as his running mate then-Senator Felix Perez Camacho, but was defeated by incumbent Democratic governor Carl T.C. Gutierrez and his running mate Madeleine Bordallo for a contentious race ultimately decided by the U.S. Supreme Court. In 2000, Ada ran for senator once more and was elected, joining the Republican majority in the legislature. In 2002, he ran for Congressional delegate against Democrat Madeleine Bordallo, but lost.

=== UOG Vice-Chairman ===
He recently serves as the vice-chairman of the board of the University of Guam Endowment Foundation. Founded by Jesus S. Leon Guerrero, the foundation is dedicated to promoting the university through academic enhancements, scholarship opportunities, and development of creative fundraising opportunities for overall improvements to the campus.

== Electoral history ==
1978 Guam gubernatorial general election results
Party	Candidate	Votes	%
Republican	Paul M. Calvo/Joseph F. Ada	13,649	52.12%
Democratic	Ricardo J. Bordallo/Pedro C. Sanchez	12,540	47.88%

1986 Guam gubernatorial general election results
Party	Candidate	Votes	%
Republican	Joseph F. Ada/Frank F. Blas	18,325	53.79%
Democratic	Ricardo J. Bordallo/Edward Diego Reyes	15,744	46.21%

1990 Guam gubernatorial general election results
Party	Candidate	Votes	%
Republican	Joseph F. Ada/Frank F. Blas	20,677	56.89%
Democratic	Madeleine Z. Bordallo/Jose A.R. Duenas	15,668	43.11%

1998 Guam gubernatorial general election results
Party	Candidate	Votes	%
Democratic	Carl T.C. Gutierrez/Madeleine Z. Bordallo	24,159	49.80%
Republican	Joseph F. Ada/Felix P. Camacho	21,147	43.59%

Guam Delegate to the U.S. House of Representatives results 2002
Party	Candidate	Votes	%
Democratic	Madeleine Bordallo	27,081	63.60
Republican	Joseph F. Ada	14,836	34.84

Political offices
Preceded by Florencio Ramirez	Speaker of the Guam Legislature; 1975–1979	Succeeded by Tommy Tanaka
Preceded by Rudy Sablan	Lieutenant Governor of Guam; 1979–1983	Succeeded by Edward Diego Reyes
Preceded by Ricardo Bordallo	Governor of Guam; 1987–1995	Succeeded by Carl Gutierrez
Party political offices
Preceded by Paul McDonald Calvo	Republican nominee for Governor of Guam; 1986, 1990	Succeeded by Tommy Tanaka
Preceded by Tommy Tanaka	Republican nominee for Governor of Guam; 1998	Succeeded by Felix Perez Camacho
Preceded by Pedro C. Sanchez	Republican nominee for Lieutenant Governor of Guam; 1978	Succeeded by Peter Perez
