= Carlos Camacho =

Guamanian dentist and politician (1924–1979)

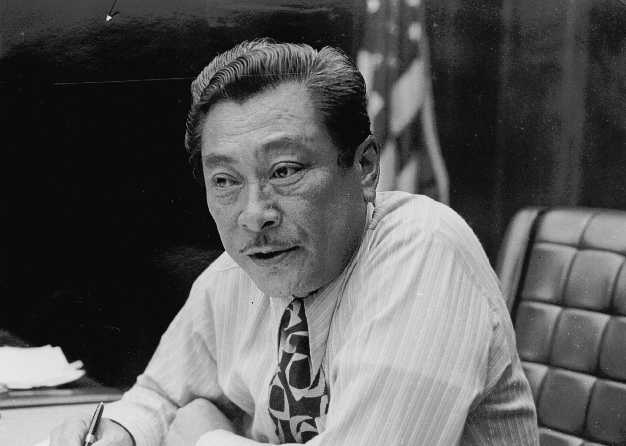

1st Governor of Guam
- In office January 4, 1971 – January 6, 1975
- Lieutenant: Kurt Moylan
- Preceded by: Position established Himself (as Appointed Governor of Guam)
- Succeeded by: Ricardo Bordallo

7th Appointed Governor of Guam
- In office July 20, 1969 – January 4, 1971
- Appointed by: Richard Nixon
- Preceded by: Manuel Flores Leon Guerrero
- Succeeded by: Position abolished Himself (as Governor of Guam)

Senator of the Guam Legislature
- In office January 4, 1965 – January 2, 1967

Personal details
- Born: Carlos Garcia Camacho; November 16, 1924 Hagåtña, Guam
- Died: December 6, 1979 (aged 55) Tamuning, Guam
- Party: Republican
- Spouse: Lourdes Perez Camacho (m. 1955)
- Children: 7, including Felix and Mary
- Education: Aquinas College (BS); Marquette University (DDS)

Carlos Garcia Camacho (November 16, 1924 – December 6, 1979) was an American politician noted for being the first elected governor of Guam, serving in the position from 1971 to 1975. A member of the Republican Party, he had previously served as the last appointed governor of Guam from 1969 to 1971 under President Richard Nixon. Prior to this, he was a member of the Guam Legislature.

== Early life and education ==
Camacho was born in the village of Hagåtña, Guam to Felix Martinez Camacho (1895–1977) and Antonia Cruz Garcia (1893–1985). His siblings included Maria Josefina Tanaka, Juan Camacho, Luis Camacho and Eddie Camacho.

From 1946 to 1949, he attended Aquinas College in Grand Rapids, Michigan. In 1952, he earned a D.D.S. degree from Marquette University in Milwaukee, Wisconsin.

== Governor of Guam ==
=== Service as appointed Governor of Guam ===
Camacho served in the Guam Legislature from 1965 to 1967. At the age of 44, he was appointed Governor of Guam by President Richard Nixon, succeeding Manuel F.L. Guerrero. Kurt Moylan was appointed as his Lieutenant Governor.

In December 1969, Camacho made a historic trip to Vietnam to visit the Chamoru troops that were serving there to assist the war effort on Christmas. Camacho's term as appointed governor lasted only eighteen months, as Congress passed the Guam Elective Governor Act in 1968 to allow Guamanians to elect their own governors; the law would take effect in 1970.

=== Elected Governor of Guam ===
==== 1970 election ====
In 1970, Camacho ran for Governor in the territory's first gubernatorial election. Camacho first selected senator G. Ricardo Salas as his lieutenant governor running mate, but Salas was subsequently replaced by former Secretary of Guam Kurt Moylan.

The Democratic primary was close between former governor Manuel F. L. Guerrero, Senator Ricardo Bordallo, and attorney and former speaker Joaquin C. "Kin" Arriola. After a contentious runoff election, Bordallo defeated Guerrero. In the general election, the Republican ticket of Camacho/Moylan defeated the Democratic ticket of Bordallo/Taitano.

==== Tenure ====
Camacho and Moylan's inauguration was held on January 4, 1971 at the Plaza de España in Agana. He used the resources of the government to enhance economic opportunities by granting incentives through the Guam Economics Development and offering various forms of assistance to the private sector. During his entire five and a half years in office, Camacho presided over one of the largest eras of hotel construction activities on Guam, with construction finishing or starting on the Kakue Hotel, Reef Hotel, Hilton Hotel, Okura Hotel, Fujita Tumon Beach, Continental Travelodge, and Guam Dai Ichi Hotel.

Camacho initiated massive road projects that were continued by his successors, including the widening of Marine Drive (now Marine Corps Drive) from Hospital Road north to Route 16 in Harmon, and the reconstruction of other major highways in the villages of Agat, Dededo and Tamuning, among others.

He is also credited with enticing many educated Chamorros back to Guam, to reverse what was seen as a “brain drain” at the time, including Tony Palomo, Greg Sanchez, Mary Sanchez, Tony Unpingco, Pedro C. Sanchez, Katherine B. Aguon, Juan C. Tenorio, Bert Unpingco, Ben Perez, Eddie Duenas, Joseph F. Ada and Frank Blas. Many of them took jobs with the government of Guam as administrators and later became senators. Camacho also kept on other able administrators even if they were not of his party affiliation which served to stabilize the government.

As a team, Camacho and Moylan worked to develop economic opportunity by creating incentives to attract business and encourage local participation in business. At the time Guam elected its first governor the federal government still had control over much of the island's utilities and roads. They struggled to work toward gaining more self-government and self-determination.

==== 1974 election ====
In the 1974 gubernatorial election, Camacho ran for re-election, facing a re-match with senator Ricardo Bordallo. Camacho won a plurality in the election, but an election challenge from the Bordallo campaign went all the U.S. Supreme Court. Bordallo won in the runoff election held later that year.

== Personal life ==
Camacho's wife was Lourdes Perez Camacho. They have seven children. His son Felix Perez Camacho served as Governor of Guam from 2003 to 2011 and was an unsuccessful candidate for Governor in the 2022 gubernatorial election. His only daughter Mary Camacho Torres became a senator in the Guam Legislature. Camacho's other children are Carlos, Thomas, Ricardo, Francis, and Victor.

== Later years ==
Following his defeat for reelection as governor, Camacho returned to his career as a dentist, continuing in private practice until his death on December 6, 1979, four years later, at the age of 55. He is buried at the Pigo Cemetery in Anigua.

== Electoral history ==
1970 Guam gubernatorial general election results
Party	Candidate	Votes	%
Republican	Carlos G. Camacho/Kurt S. Moylan	11,396	55.80%
Democratic	Ricardo J. Bordallo/Richard F. Taitano	9,028	44.20%

1974 Guam gubernatorial general election results (November 4, 1974)
Party	Candidate	Votes	%
Republican	Carlos G. Camacho/Kurt S. Moylan	8,830	39.52%
Democratic	Ricardo J. Bordallo/Rudolph G. Sablan	7,203	32.24%
Independent	Paul M. Calvo/Antonio M. Palomo (write-in)	6,311	28.25%

1974 Guam gubernatorial general election results in runoff (November 19, 1974)
Party	Candidate	Votes	%
Democratic	Ricardo J. Bordallo/Rudolph G. Sablan	11,441	51.41%
Republican	Carlos G. Camacho/Kurt S. Moylan	10,814	48.59%

Political offices
Preceded by Manuel Flores Leon Guerrero	Governor of Guam; 1969–1975	Succeeded by Ricardo Bordallo
Party political offices
First	Republican nominee for Governor of Guam; 1970, 1974	Succeeded by Paul McDonald Calvo
