= Tony Palomo =

Guam journalist and politician (1931–2013)

Antonio "Tony" Palomo

Senator of the 12th, 14th, and 15th Guam Legislature
- In office January 1, 1973 – January 5, 1981

Personal details
- Born: Antonio Manibusan Palomo; June 13, 1931 Agana (now Hagåtña), Guam
- Died: February 1, 2013 (aged 81) Tamuning, Guam
- Party: Republican Party of Guam
- Spouse: Margarita Manibusan
- Children: 10
- Education: Marquette University
- Occupation: Politician, historian, journalist, columnist, academic
- Nickname: Tony

Antonio "Tony" Manibusan Palomo (June 13, 1931 – February 1, 2013) was a Guamanian politician, historian, journalist, columnist, and academic. Palomo served as a senator in the Legislature of Guam and the director of the Guam Museum from December 1995 to June 2007.

== Early life ==
Palomo was born in Agana, Guam, (present-day Hagåtña) on June 13, 1931, the oldest of nine children of Vicente Gogo Palomo and Dolores "Lydia" Mendiola Manibusan. He attended both Padre Palomo and Agana Elementary Schools.

He was ten years old when Japanese forces attacked Guam on December 8, 1941, leading to the occupation of the island during World War II. Palomo graduated from Belmont Abbey College Prep School in Charlotte, North Carolina, in 1950. He received a Bachelor of Science degree in journalism from the College of Journalism at Marquette University, a Jesuit university in Milwaukee, Wisconsin, in 1954. He began his journalism career as a Milwaukee Sentinel copy boy while attending Marquette.

Palomo returned to Guam following his graduation from Marquette. He married his wife, Margarita, in 1958 and the couple raised their ten children in Tamuning.

== Career ==
=== Journalism ===
Palomo began his journalism career in Guam as a proofreader and general assignment reporter for the Guam Daily News. (The Guam Daily News is a predecessor to the modern-day Pacific Daily News newspaper). He served as the assistant managing editor and sports editor of the Guam Daily News from 1954 until 1963. In addition to his work for the Pacific Daily News, Palomo also worked as a Guam-based correspondent for the Associated Press and a reporter for the Pacific-edition of the Stars and Stripes, reporting on the Vietnam War during the era.

Palomo was also involved with other magazines and newspapers as well. He edited the weekly newspaper, Pacifican; served as both the publisher and editor of the monthly magazine, Pacific Profile; and worked as the editor of the daily newspaper, Pacific Journal.

=== Political career ===
In 1969, Palomo served as the President of the first Constitutional Convention of Guam. He was also a member of the first Commission on Self-Determination for Guam. He attended the South Pacific Conference, the predecessor of the Secretariat of the Pacific Community, held in Noumea, New Caledonia, in 1969 as Guam's official delegate to the conference. Palomo advised the delegation of the United States to the South Pacific Commission. For a short time, Palomo was the general manager of the Guam Tourist Commission, the forerunner of the modern-day Guam Visitors Bureau.

Tony Palomo became the special assistant to the first elected Governor of Guam, Carlos Camacho. Palomo was also the records manager and administrative director of the 8th Guam Legislature prior to running for elected office.

Palomo was elected as a Senator during the 12th, 14th, and 15th Guam Legislatures during the 1970s and early 1980s. He served as the Chairman of the Committee on Rules and the Committee on Territorial and Federal Affairs during his tenure as a senator.

After leaving office, Palomo became a special assistant to the Assistant Secretary of the United States Department of Interior in 1982. From 1986 until 1994, Palomo was a Department of the Interior desk officer for American Samoa and the U.S. Virgin Islands, as well as an Interior Department's Guam field representative. He held the position of acting Assistant Secretary of the Interior for Territorial and International Affairs for a time.

=== Historian ===
A historian who specialized in the history of Guam, Palomo taught history at the University of Guam and Guam Community College. In 1984, he published "An Island in Agony," a book documenting the Chamorro experience during World War II and the Japanese occupation of Guam.

Palomo served as the Director of the Guam Museum from December 1995 to June 2007. Palomo oversaw the opening of an exhibit of Guamanian history at the Micronesia Mall beginning in April 2004, which has attracted more than 200,000 visitors to date. Palomo was a strong advocate for the construction of a permanent building for the Guam Museum. He retired as the museum's director on June 13, 2007.

On February 5, 2013, just four days after Palomo's death, a groundbreaking ceremony was held for the new $27 million permanent museum, which was scheduled to open in 2014. The groundbreaking for the museum, which will be built at Skinner Plaza in Hagåtña, was attended by Palomo's widow, Margaret, and Governor Eddie Calvo. Gov. Eddie Calvo paid tribute to Palomo during the ceremony, as well as another prominent Guamanian historian, Dirk Ballendorf, who died on February 4, 2013.

=== Death ===
Tony Palomo died at Guam Memorial Hospital in Tamuning, Guam, on February 1, 2013, at the age of 81. He was survived by his wife, Margarita, and nine of their ten children. A state funeral was held for Palomo at the Legislature of Guam on February 11, 2013. His eulogy was given by former Senator Eddie Duenas, while singers Jesse Bias and Ruby Aquiningoc Santos sang The Star-Spangled Banner and The Guam Hymn. Palomo, who was a member of St. Anthony/St. Victor Catholic Church, was buried at Pigo Cemetery.
