= Eddie Baza Calvo =

Governor of Guam from 2011 to 2019

Eddie Calvo
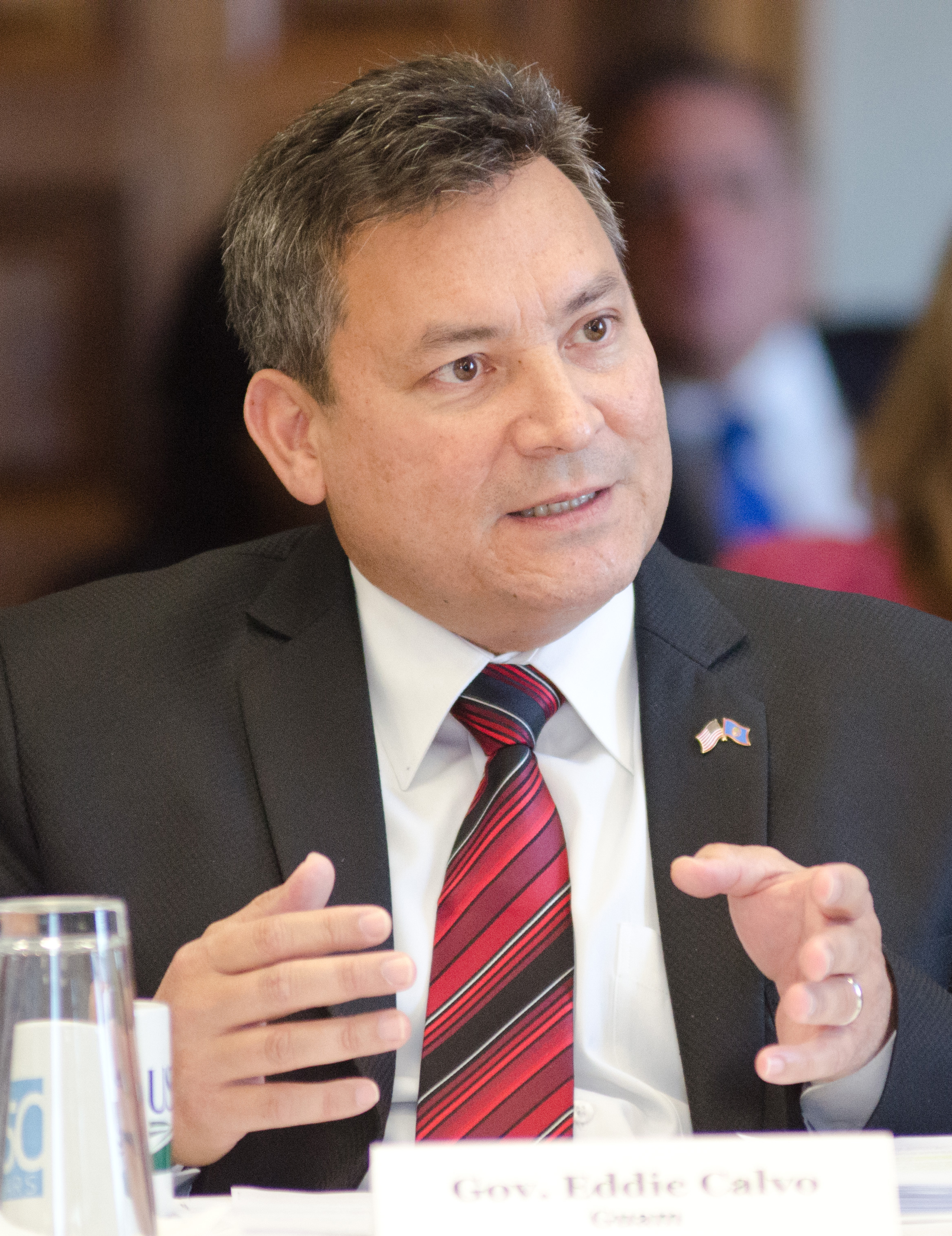
- Calvo in 2012

8th Governor of Guam
- In office January 3, 2011 – January 7, 2019
- Lieutenant: Ray Tenorio
- Preceded by: Felix Perez Camacho
- Succeeded by: Lou Leon Guerrero

Minority Leader of the Guam Legislature
- In office January 5, 2009 – January 3, 2011
- Preceded by: Mark Forbes
- Succeeded by: Frank F. Blas Jr.

Vice Speaker of the Guam Legislature
- In office January 1, 2007 – March 7, 2008
- Preceded by: Joanne M. Brown
- Succeeded by: Dave Shimizu

Member of the Guam Legislature
- In office January 3, 2005 – January 3, 2011
- In office January 4, 1999 – January 6, 2003

Personal details
- Born: Edward Jerome Baza Calvo; August 29, 1961 (age 64) Tamuning, Guam
- Party: Republican
- Spouse: Christine Lujan Sonido (m. 1987)
- Children: 6
- Relatives: Paul McDonald Calvo (father); Rose Baza Calvo (mother)
- Education: Notre Dame de Namur University (BA)

Edward Jerome Baza Calvo /ˈbɑːzə ˈkælvoʊ/ (born August 29, 1961) is an American politician who served as the eighth governor of Guam from January 3, 2011 to January 7, 2019. A member of the Republican Party, Calvo was a five-term Senator within the Legislature of Guam. He became the Governor of Guam, having defeated Democrat Carl Gutierrez in the 2010 gubernatorial election. Calvo chose Senator Ray Tenorio as his running mate for lieutenant governor of Guam.

== Personal life and education ==
Calvo was born on August 29, 1961, in Tamuning, Guam, U.S. and is the son of Governor Paul McDonald Calvo, who served as the governor of Guam from 1979 until 1983, and former Guamanian First Lady Rose Baza Calvo. His paternal grandparents were Eduardo Torres Calvo and Veronica Mariano McDonald Calvo, who resided in Maite, Guam. His maternal grandparents were Antonio Camacho Baza, a former United States Marshal, and Delores Cruz Herrero, who resided in Sinajana, Guam.

Calvo initially attended Father Dueñas Memorial School in Guam before moving to California, where he graduated from Saint Francis High School in Mountain View, California, in 1979. Calvo received a bachelor's degree in business administration from Notre Dame de Namur University in Belmont, California.

He married Christine Lujan Sonido in 1987. The couple have six children.

== Career ==
Calvo worked in the private sector before entering politics in the late 1990s. He formerly worked as the general manager of the Pacific Construction Company and the vice president and general manager of the Pepsi Bottling Company of Guam.

Calvo, a Republican, was first elected as a Senator in the Guam Legislature in 1998, taking office in 1999. He has since been elected to five terms in office (with a two-year break after his defeat in the lieutenant gubernatorial primary in 2002). Calvo has served as both the Vice Speaker and Acting Speaker of the Legislature during his tenure in office.

In 2002, Calvo ran for Lieutenant Governor of Guam as the running mate of Republican gubernatorial candidate, Tony Unpingco, the former Speaker of the Legislature. However, the Unpingco-Calvo ticket was defeated in the Republican primary election by gubernatorial candidate Felix Perez Camacho, who went on to be elected governor in the 2002 general election.

=== Governor of Guam ===
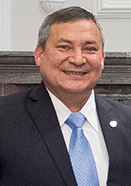
Calvo in 2017

==== 2010 election ====
On April 30, 2010, Calvo announced that he would leave the Legislature at the end of his term. In the same speech, Calvo simultaneously told supporters at Chamorro Village that he intended to seek the Republican nomination for Governor of Guam in 2010. He chose Senator Ray Tenorio as his running mate.

Calvo went on to defeat Lieutenant Governor Michael Cruz in the Republican primary election on September 4, 2010 and ran against former Democratic Governor Carl Gutierrez and his running mate, Senator Frank Aguon. The Calvo-Tenorio ticket won the 2010 gubernatorial election by a slim margin, and although the final count was enough to win the election, it was still within 2% of the Guiterrez Aguon ticket. Immediately after the election, a recount was ordered by the Guam Election Commission.

==== 2014 election ====
Governor Eddie Calvo and Lt. Governor Ray Tenorio announced their intention to seek re-election for a second four-year term. The team held the first official rally to kickoff their campaign on June 7, 2014 at their campaign headquarters in Anigua, following a motorcade of supporters from Yigo.

Calvo again faced Democratic Nominee Carl Gutierrez in the general election. Calvo defeated Gutierrez in the general election, winning 64 percent of the vote.

==== Tenure ====
As governor, Calvo set a policy of hiring only government employees with at least a high school diploma. According to Josh Barro of The New York Times, Calvo stopped "some of Guam's worst fiscal practices", such as financing itself by delaying tax refunds, and ran consecutive budget surpluses.

In February 2014, Calvo signed Bill 146, which made the Castle Doctrine the law in Guam. Additionally, in May 2014 Calvo signed Bill 296 into law, which changed language for concealed firearms licensing from "may" to "shall", meaning that concealed firearm licenses "shall" be issued to an applicant who meets the various specifications.

In March 2012, Calvo endorsed Mitt Romney for president. In January 2016 he endorsed Texas Senator Ted Cruz during the 2016 Republican primary, and after Cruz dropped out of the primaries he endorsed Donald Trump.

Calvo intended to include a referendum on Guam's status, similar to the referendums held in January and September 1982, during the island's November 2016 elections, but it was delayed.

In January 2017 Calvo submitted a proposed law to legalize recreational cannabis in Guam.

Legislature of Guam
Preceded by Joanne M. Brown	Vice Speaker of the Guam Legislature; 2007–2008	Succeeded by Dave Shimizu
Preceded by Mark Forbes	Minority Leader of the Guam Legislature; 2009–2011	Succeeded by Frank F. Blas Jr.
Party political offices
Preceded by Felix Perez Camacho	Republican nominee for Governor of Guam; 2010, 2014	Succeeded by Ray Tenorio
Political offices
Preceded by Felix Perez Camacho	Governor of Guam; 2011–2019	Succeeded by Lou Leon Guerrero
