= Felix Perez Camacho =

Governor of Guam from 2003 to 2011

Felix Camacho
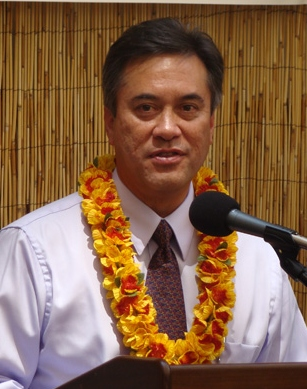
- Camacho in 2007

7th Governor of Guam
- In office January 6, 2003 – January 3, 2011
- Lieutenant: Kaleo Moylan; Michael Cruz
- Preceded by: Carl Gutierrez
- Succeeded by: Eddie Calvo

Member of the Guam Legislature
- In office January 4, 1993 – January 6, 2003

Personal details
- Born: Felix James Pérez Camacho; October 30, 1957 (age 69) Camp Zama, Japan
- Party: Republican
- Spouse: Joann Garcia
- Children: 3
- Relatives: Carlos Camacho (father); Lourdes Perez Camacho (mother); Mary Camacho Torres (sister)
- Education: Marquette University (BS)

Felix James Pérez Camacho (born October 30, 1957) is an American politician and businessman who served as the seventh governor of Guam from 2003 to 2011. A member of the Republican Party of Guam, he had previously served as a six-term senator in the Guam Legislature from 1993 to 2003.

Born into the Camacho family, his father, Carlos Camacho, served as the 1st Governor of Guam from 1969 to 1975. Camacho unsuccessfully ran for Governor again in the 2022 Guamanian election, losing to incumbent Democrat Lou Leon Guerrero.

== Early life ==
Camacho was born in Camp Zama, a U.S. military base in Japan. Camacho's father was Carlos Camacho. Camacho's mother was Lourdes Perez Camacho. He was raised in Tamuning, Guam, and was educated in the Catholic school system. Camacho's father became Guam's last appointed governor in 1969, and subsequently became the first elected governor in 1971. In 1980, Camacho received a degree in business administration and finance from Marquette University.

== Political career ==
Camacho has held positions with Pacific Financial Corporation as an insurance manager, and with IBM as an account administrator. In March 1988, Governor Joseph Franklin Ada appointed him as deputy director of the Public Utility Agency of Guam, and he was chosen to be the executive director of the department later that year. In 1992, Camacho was elected as senator in the 22nd Guam Legislature, and was subsequently re-elected in 1994 and 1996. As a senator, he served as chairman of the Committee on Tourism, Transportation, and Economic Development. He also served as a majority whip.

In 1998, Camacho was the running mate of Joseph Ada in the hotly-contested gubernatorial campaign. Their loss resulted in Camacho's absence from public office for the next two years. Having won in the 2000 legislative election, Camacho returned to the legislature and regained his chairmanship, as well as the position of assistant majority leader.

== Elections ==
=== 2002 gubernatorial candidacy ===
In 2002, Camacho teamed up with fellow senator, Kaleo Moylan, to run for the positions as Guam's governor and lieutenant governor, respectively. On August 31, 2002, Camacho-Moylan went on to defeat Speaker Antonio “Tony” Unpingco in the Republican primary election. Additionally, Camacho-Moylan’s campaign for the general election ran successfully against Democratic contenders Guam Delegate Congressman Robert A. Underwood, and his running mate, Senator Thomas "Tom" C. Ada.

=== 2006 gubernatorial candidacy ===
Due to various disagreements with Moylan during their first term, Camacho picked freshman senator Michael Cruz, M.D. as his running mate in 2006. Camacho again defeated Robert A. Underwood (this time with senator Frank Aguon Jr. as running mate) to win the governorship for a second term.

=== 2016 Congressional run ===
In 2016 he ran against Democratic incumbent Madeleine Bordallo to represent Guam's at-large congressional district, but was defeated 53% to 47%.

=== 2022 gubernatorial candidacy ===
Camacho launched his campaign again for the 2022 Republican nomination for governor of Guam with senator Tony Ada as his running mate in February 2022. He was defeated in the general election by incumbent Democratic Governor Lou Leon Guerrero.

== Governorship ==
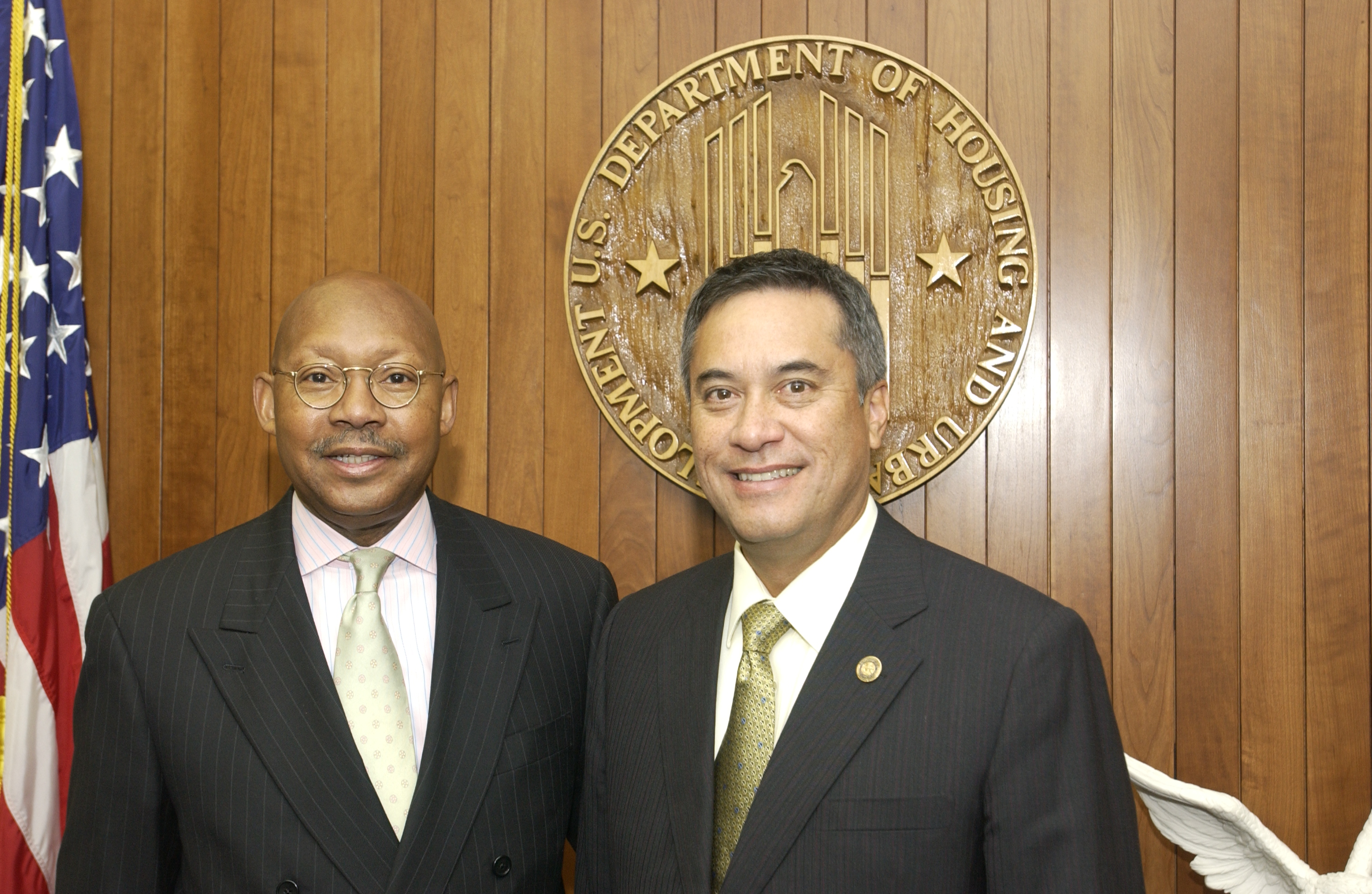
Governor Camacho with HUD Secretary Alphonso Jackson in 2008.

=== Tenure ===
On December 8, 2002, Guam was slammed by Super Typhoon Pongsona, shortly after Camacho and Moylan were elected into office. They opted not to have a formal inaugural celebration, due to the state of the island. The duo instead chose to be sworn in with a ceremony at the Plaza de España at midnight, after a celebratory mass at the Dulce Nombre de Maria Cathedral Basilica in Hagåtña—all under candle light.

Typhoon Pogsona occurred just six months after the island had been devastated by Typhoon Chataan, and left the citizens of Guam reeling from the aftermath. Widespread damage affected facilities and structures in both the public and private sectors, which included: hospitals, schools, Guam International Airport, the Port of Guam, hotels, businesses, and hundreds of homes. The damages were estimated at $246 million by the Federal Emergency Management Agency. Fuel tanks at the Cabras Island caught on fire making it unsafe for ships to come into the harbor. The Guam Telephone Authority and A.B. Won Pat International Airport were also shut down for a time. Soon, though, approximately 10,000 tourists who had been on Guam since before the storm were able to go home. Camacho and his administration worked on getting the power, water, communications and transportation systems running again, as well as re-opening the island’s schools and getting assistance to people with typhoon damaged homes and businesses. Tourism went down to a minimum and the government was essentially bankrupt.

Camacho led the effort to restore the island to normalcy, along with much help from the government of Guam, federal government, the military, the business community and the resilient citizens. Three months later island leaders let potential visitors know that the island was ready to welcome them again and tourism rebounded.

The Camacho Administration had other challenges to governing Guam as well. Due to concerns about the way the previous administration had handled government affairs, the Guam Legislature enacted legislation to remove power from the Office of the Governor in several ways. For the first time Guam had an elected attorney general and an elected auditor. There was also an elected school board and appointed superintendent of education who had complete authority over the largest government agency, the Guam Department of Education.

Likewise, for the first time the people of Guam had elected a board to run the government's utilities. The Consolidated Utilities Commission took management of the power and water out of the Governor’s hands. The Public Utilities Commission also set utility rates, and the Guam Telephone Authority was sold to a private company in 2005, the last government owned telephone exchange in the United States, taking even more government responsibility away from the administration.

Camacho took office during austere times. Guam lacked sufficient revenues to pay its obligations. The mandates of local and federal law far exceed the governments fiscal capacity to honor those obligations. To supplement revenues, Camacho sought to issue bonds worth approximately $400 million. However, the attorney general refused to sign the bond contracts because he concluded that issuance of the bonds would violate the debt limitation. In response, the Governor requested a declaration from the Guam Supreme Court that the issuance of the bonds would not cause Guam to exceed the debt limitation. The Guam Supreme Court agreed with the Governor and the attorney general appealed his decision. Four years later the US Supreme Court heard the matter and in the end the Governor was able to issue bonds.

In the meantime, several lawsuits dramatically impacted the government and the Governor had to prioritize government resources toward addressing many of these challenges. The following are a few of the major lawsuits against the government to which the government paid out millions of dollars.

In 1993, a class action lawsuit was filed against Governor Ada to implement a 1988 statute to provide annually to eligible government of Guam retirees a cost of living allowance to be computed by multiplying the entitle benefit times the rate of inflation based on the cost of living index. The law was later repealed in 1995. In 2006, the court awarded $123 million to the COLA class action suit and the government began to pay the judgment.

Since the US Environmental Protection Agency issued an order in 1986 to cease discharging leachate from the Ordot Dump, Camacho signed a consent decree in 2004 to close Ordot Dump and construct a new solid waste landfill facility. The terms of the decree appeared to be workable but in actuality it become difficult to comply with the decree due to resistance by members of the public and the legislature. Additionally, the lack of resources, experienced personnel, and necessary support prevented the government from meeting the various deadlines set forth in the consent decree.

The court imposed penalties of more than $2.86 million against the government for failing to abide by the mandates of the consent decree. Ultimately, the federal court appointed a receiver to enforce the terms of the consent decree and assume all the functions of the solid waste management division of the Department of Public Works. The court ordered the government to deposit $20 million into an account while the government with the court appointed receiver worked out a financing option for the consent decree projects. When a viable financing option was not presented to the court, the court ordered the government to deposit $993,700 on a weekly basis into the account. Eventually, the court suspended the weekly payments when the government issued bonds totaling $202 million for the consent decree projects.

In 2001, a group of mentally ill individuals who lived on Guam filed suit against Camacho's predecessor, Governor Gutierrez, for failure to provide community-based living services to the mentally ill. The court found that defendants had discriminated against plaintiffs by requiring them to reside in the adult In-patient units to receive services, and that the services provided to Plaintiffs were not appropriate to their particular needs. Additionally, the court found that the Defendants had violated the Plaintiffs' constitutional rights to minimum standards of care and appointed a federal management team in 2010.

In 2004, a class action lawsuit was filed against Camacho claiming refunds of approximately $112 million as a result of the earned income tax credit. The complaint was amended in 2006 wherein the class asked for approximately $135 million. The parties settled the case for $90 million. In anticipation of the court’s approval of the settlement agreement, the Camacho Administration managed to set aside millions of dollars in order to begin payments according to the terms of the settlement agreement.

The government budget was lower as well, at $396 million from a previous $500 million. Another first, also due to legislative mandates, was that the budget was based on gross receipt taxes, which at that time was four percent. That model simply didn't work as GRT fluctuates too much over the year and the law was later rescinded. Eventually the GRT was raised from four to six percent much to the dismay of the private sector. The entire administration took temporary cuts in pay, including the governor. Non-essential government employees were placed on a 32 hour work week until revenues started recovering.

One of Camacho's challenges in taking office was the change of having an elected attorney general. In the past, the appointed attorney general worked for the governor but now the elected attorney general saw his role as a watchdog and became very litigious. Moylan, first cousin to Lieutenant Governor Moylan, told the governor that the courts would define his limits and that he was not the governor's lackey anymore. The joke at the time was that the A.G. for attorney general, also stood for “aspiring governor."

Lawsuits and legal challenges defined those first two years and the dynamic of being the governor of Guam changed. The legislature, at the time, believed that the position of Governor of Guam held too much authority as granted by the Organic Act of Guam. Even though there was a Republican majority in the Legislature, several of the senators also had aspirations to be governor.

== Personal life ==
Camacho's wife is Joann Garcia Camacho. They have three children and three grandchildren. Mrs. Camacho is a niece of Vicente "Ben" Gumataotao, the mayor of Piti and first cousin of Jose Gumataotao, the husband of the former US Treasurer, Rosa Gumataotao Rios, the cousin of judge Vernon Perez, and other cousin of a local entrepreneur Valentino Gumataotao Perez. He is a member of the Knights of Columbus and participates in many civic activities. He was honored as one of the Outstanding Young Men of America and received the Pacific Jaycees Three Young Outstanding People award.

== Electoral history ==
2002 Guam gubernatorial election
| Party | Candidate | Votes | % |
|---|---|---|---|
| Republican | Felix P. Camacho/Kaleo S. Moylan | 24,309 | 55.41 |
| Democratic | Robert A. Underwood/Thomas C. Ada | 19,559 | 44.59 |

2006 Guam gubernatorial election
| Party | Candidate | Votes | % |
|---|---|---|---|
| Republican | Felix P. Camacho/Michael W. Cruz | 19,560 | 50.25 |
| Democratic | Robert A. Underwood/Frank B. Aguon Jr. | 18,700 | 48.04 |

2016 Guam Delegate general election results
| Party | Candidate | Votes | % |
|---|---|---|---|
| Democratic | Madeleine Bordallo (incumbent) | 18,345 | 53.69% |
| Republican | Felix P. Camacho | 15,617 | 45.71% |

2022 Guam gubernatorial election
| Party | Candidate | Votes | % |
|---|---|---|---|
| Democratic | Lou Leon Guerrero/Josh Tenorio | 18,623 | 55.49 |
| Republican | Felix P. Camacho/Vicente Ada | 14,786 | 44.06 |

Party political offices
| Preceded by Doris Flores Brooks | Republican nominee for Lieutenant Governor of Guam; 1998 | Succeeded by Kaleo Moylan |
| Preceded by Joseph Franklin Ada | Republican nominee for Governor of Guam; 2002, 2006 | Succeeded by Eddie Calvo |
| Preceded by Ray Tenorio | Republican nominee for Governor of Guam; 2022 | Succeeded by Vicente Ada |
Political offices
| Preceded by Carl Gutierrez | Governor of Guam; 2003–2011 | Succeeded by Eddie Calvo |
