= Kurt Moylan =

Guamanian politician

1st Lieutenant Governor of Guam
- In office January 4, 1971 – January 6, 1975
- Governor: Carlos Camacho
- Preceded by: Office established
- Succeeded by: Rudolph Sablan

7th Secretary of Guam
- In office July 20, 1969 – January 4, 1971
- Governor: Carlos Camacho
- Preceded by: Denver Dickerson
- Succeeded by: Office abolished

Personal details
- Born: Kurt Scott Kaleo Moylan; January 14, 1939 (age 87) Honolulu, Territory of Hawaii (now State of Hawaii)
- Party: Republican
- Spouse: Judith "Judy" A. Moylan
- Children: 4 (including Kaleo)
- Parent(s): Francis L. "Scotty" Moylan; Yuk Lan Ho
- Occupation: Politician

Kurt Scott Kaleo Moylan (born January 14, 1939) is a Guamanian politician who served as the first lieutenant governor of Guam from January 4, 1971, to January 6, 1975, and the seventh and last Secretary of Guam from July 20, 1969, to January 4, 1971, in the administration of Governor of Guam Carlos Camacho.

== Biography ==
Moylan is one of four children born to businessman Francis "Scotty" Moylan (1916–2010) and his wife, Yuk Lan Kamaka Ho, who is of Chinese and Hawaiian descent. Scotty Moylan, moved to Guam from Chicago following World War II and became one of the island's most successful businesspeople. Kurt Moylan has three siblings – Richard, Lena and Francis Jr.

Moylan is married to Judith A. Moylan, the couple have four children Cassandra, Kaleo, Miki and Troy and many grandchildren.

== See also ==
- List of minority governors and lieutenant governors in the United States

Political offices
Preceded by None	Lieutenant Governor of Guam; 1971–1975	Succeeded by Rudolph Sablan
Preceded by Denver Dickerson	Secretary of Guam; 1969–1971	Succeeded by Abolished
Party political offices
First	Republican nominee for Lieutenant Governor of Guam; 1970, 1974	Succeeded by Joseph Franklin Ada
