= Lieutenant Governor of Guam =

- Seal of Guam
- Incumbent; Josh Tenorio since January 7, 2019
- Style: The Honorable
- Term length: Four years, renewable once
- Inaugural holder: Kurt Moylan
- Formation: 1971
- Website: Office of the Lt. Governor

The Guamanian self-governing government consists of a locally elected governor, lieutenant governor and a fifteen-member Legislature. The first popular election for governor and lieutenant governor took place in 1970. The current lieutenant governor is Josh Tenorio, who has been in office since January 7, 2019.

== List of lieutenant governors of Guam ==
Lieutenant governors of Guam
No.	Lieutenant Governor	Term in office	Party	Election	Governor (Note: Lieutenant governors represented the same party as their governor unless noted.)
1	Kurt Moylan (b. 1939)	January 4, 1971 – January 6, 1975 (lost re-election)	Republican	1970	Carlos Camacho
2	Rudy Sablan (1931–1995)	January 6, 1975 – January 1, 1979 (ran for governor, lost primary)	Democratic	1974	Ricardo Bordallo
3	Joseph F. Ada (b. 1943)	January 1, 1979 – January 3, 1983 (did not run)	Republican	1978	Paul McDonald Calvo
4	Edward Diego Reyes (1930–2018)	January 3, 1983 – January 5, 1987 (lost re-election)	Democratic	1982	Ricardo Bordallo
5	Frank Blas (1941–2016)	January 5, 1987 – January 2, 1995 (ran for governor, lost primary)	Republican	1986	Joseph F. Ada
5	Frank Blas (1941–2016)	January 5, 1987 – January 2, 1995 (ran for governor, lost primary)	Republican	1990	Joseph F. Ada
6	Madeleine Bordallo (b. 1933)	January 2, 1995 – January 6, 2003 (did not run)	Democratic	1994	Carl Gutierrez
6	Madeleine Bordallo (b. 1933)	January 2, 1995 – January 6, 2003 (did not run)	Democratic	1998	Carl Gutierrez
7	Kaleo Moylan (b. 1966)	January 6, 2003 – January 1, 2007 (ran for governor, lost primary)	Republican	2002	Felix Perez Camacho
8	Michael Cruz (b. 1958)	January 1, 2007 – January 3, 2011 (ran for governor, lost primary)	Republican	2006	Felix Perez Camacho
9	Ray Tenorio (b. 1965)	January 3, 2011 – January 7, 2019 (ran for governor)	Republican	2010	Eddie Baza Calvo
9	Ray Tenorio (b. 1965)	January 3, 2011 – January 7, 2019 (ran for governor)	Republican	2014	Eddie Baza Calvo
10	Josh Tenorio (b. 1973)	January 7, 2019 – Incumbent	Democratic	2018	Lou Leon Guerrero
10	Josh Tenorio (b. 1973)	January 7, 2019 – Incumbent	Democratic	2022	Lou Leon Guerrero
