= Madeleine Bordallo =

Guamanian politician (born 1933)

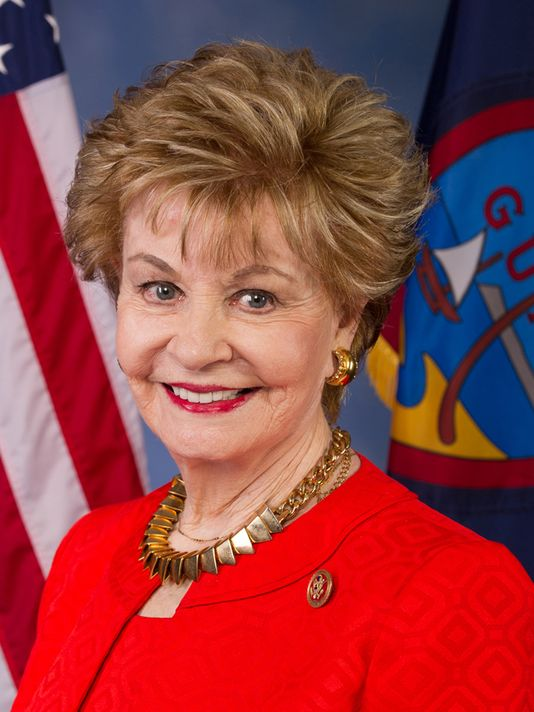

Delegate to the U.S. House of Representatives from Guam's at-large district
- In office January 3, 2003 – January 3, 2019
- Preceded by: Robert A. Underwood
- Succeeded by: Michael San Nicolas

6th Lieutenant Governor of Guam
- In office January 2, 1995 – January 3, 2003
- Governor: Carl Gutierrez
- Preceded by: Frank Blas
- Succeeded by: Kaleo Moylan

Member of the Guam Legislature
- In office January 1987 – January 1995
- In office January 1981 – January 1983

First Lady of Guam
- In role January 3, 1983 – January 5, 1987
- Governor: Ricardo Bordallo
- Preceded by: Rosa Herrero Baza
- Succeeded by: Rosanna Santos Ada
- In role January 6, 1975 – January 1, 1979
- Governor: Ricardo Bordallo
- Preceded by: Lourdes Perez Camacho
- Succeeded by: Rosa Herrero Baza

Personal details
- Born: Madeleine Mary Zeien; May 31, 1933 (age 93) Graceville, Minnesota, U.S.
- Party: Democratic
- Spouse: Ricardo Bordallo (m. 1953; died 1990)
- Children: 1
- Education: St. Mary's College, Indiana (attended); St. Catherine University (attended)
- Bordallo's voice Bordallo on an amendment allowing the U.S. Distant Water Tuna Fleet to use Guam as a port of call. Recorded November 4, 2011

Madeleine Mary Zeien Bordallo (Note: /bərˈdæljoʊ/) (née Zeien; born May 31, 1933) is an American-Guamanian politician who served as the delegate to the U.S. House of Representatives for Guam's at-large congressional district from January 3, 2003, to January 3, 2019.

She is the first woman ever to serve as Guam's Delegate, the first female lieutenant governor of Guam (from 1995 to 2003), the first female candidate for governor of Guam (in 1990), and the first female Democrat elected to the Legislature of Guam. Her 1990 campaign also made her the first non-Chamorro gubernatorial candidate in Guam. As the wife of Ricardo Bordallo, she was also the First Lady of Guam from 1975 to 1979 and from 1983 to 1987.

== Biography ==
Madeleine Mary Zeien was born on May 31, 1933, in Graceville, Minnesota, to a family of educators who moved to Guam after her father took a job with the Guam Department of Education. She attended St. Mary's College in Notre Dame, Indiana, and the College of St. Catherine in St. Paul, Minnesota, where she studied music. In the 1950s and 1960s, Bordallo was a television presenter for KUAM-TV, the NBC affiliate that was the first television station on Guam.

Bordallo was married to Ricardo Bordallo, who served as Governor of Guam from 1975 to 1979 and from 1983 to 1987. While serving as first lady, she worked to emphasize the arts in the classroom and to increase awareness of the local Chamorro culture. Bordallo's husband, the former governor, committed suicide in 1990, when his appeals were unsuccessful and convictions of witness tampering and conspiracy to obstruct justice would require incarceration in federal prison. Bordallo was the first female Democrat to be elected to the Guam Legislature, and she served five terms as a senator from 1981 to 1983 and again from 1987 to 1995. During the 1988 U.S. presidential election, Bordallo was a member of Guam's uncommitted delegation to the 1988 Democratic National Convention.

Bordallo and Carl Gutierrez

Bordallo was an unsuccessful candidate for Governor of Guam in 1990, following the death of her husband. Ping Duenas ran as Bordallo's running mate for lieutenant governor in the 1990 gubernatorial election.

In 1994, she ran alongside Carl Gutierrez on the Democratic ticket and was elected lieutenant governor, serving from 1995 to 2003. She was the first woman in Guam's history to hold this position. As lieutenant governor, she worked to promote tourism, environmentalism, and island beautification.

In 2002, Bordallo reached her term limit and, as Delegate Robert Underwood vacated his seat and attempted to run for governor, she campaigned for and was elected as a Democrat to the House, serving from January 2003 to January 2019. She was the first woman to represent Guam in Congress. She was one of six non-voting delegates to the House of Representatives. While in Congress, she devoted herself to economic issues and helped to pass legislation that aided small businesses on Guam. She also was involved in military and environmental issues.

In April 2008, Bordallo apologized after an investigative report by the Pacific Daily News revealed that she and Senator Jesse Lujan both claimed to have degrees on their official biographies and resumes when they had not graduated from college.

In August 2018, Bordallo lost her bid for renomination for another term as delegate in the Democratic primary to territorial senator Michael San Nicolas.

== U.S. House of Representatives ==
=== Committee assignments (2017–2019) ===
- Committee on Armed Services
  - Subcommittee on Readiness (Ranking Member)
  - Subcommittee on Seapower and Projection Forces
- Committee on Natural Resources
  - Subcommittee on Indian, Insular, and Alaska Native Affairs
  - Subcommittee on Water, Power, and Oceans

=== Caucus memberships (2017–2019) ===
- Congressional Asian Pacific American Caucus (Vice Chair)
- Congressional China Caucus (Co-Chair)
- United States Congressional International Conservation Caucus
- Long Range Strike Caucus
- United States-Philippines Friendship Caucus
- Wounded to Work Caucus
- U.S.-Japan Caucus
- House Baltic Caucus
- Congressional NextGen 9-1-1 Caucus

=== Legislation ===
Bordallo objected to amendments the United States Senate made to the Omnibus Territories Act of 2013. Originally, the bill would have included the provisions to create a fund in the U.S. treasury to pay reparation claims to "living Guam residents who were raped, injured, interned, or subjected to forced labor or marches, or internment resulting from, or incident to, such occupation and subsequent liberation; and (2) survivors of compensable residents who died in war." This provision, however, was removed from the bill. Bordallo was "extremely disappointed" by this change and said that she was "committed to continuing our fight for war claims for our manamko despite all the obstacles the conservative Republicans continue to raise." The changes were made so that the bill could pass by unanimous consent.

=== Elections ===
In January 2012, Republican Guam Senator Frank Blas Jr. announced he would challenge Bordallo in the upcoming November election for her delegate seat. Bordallo defeated Blas in the November general election. She received 19,765 votes (58%) to his 12,995 votes (38%)

In May 2012, Yale graduate and former White House intern Karlo Dizon, Democrat, also announced his bid as delegate to Congress. Bordallo defeated Dizon in the primary election, with 73% of the vote.

In 2014, she ran for delegate alongside Matthew Pascual Artero in the Democratic primary election. Bordallo defeated Artero in the primary election on August 30, 2014. Republican candidate Margaret McDonald Metcalfe announced that she would challenge Bordallo in the 2014 November election for her delegate seat.

In 2016, she was re-elected by the smallest margin, 53% to 47%, since she was first elected when she faced former Governor of Guam Felix Perez Camacho.

In the 2018 elections, Bordallo lost the Democratic primary to territorial Senator Michael San Nicolas for the delegate seat in the U.S. House of Representatives by 3.4%.

== See also ==
- Women in the United States House of Representatives

== Notes ==
Party political offices
Preceded by Ricardo Bordallo	Democratic nominee for Governor of Guam; 1990	Succeeded by Carl Gutierrez
Preceded by Jose A.R. Duenas	Democratic nominee for Lieutenant Governor of Guam; 1994, 1998	Succeeded by Thomas C. Ada
Political offices
Preceded by Frank Blas	Lieutenant Governor of Guam; 1995–2003	Succeeded by Kaleo Moylan
U.S. House of Representatives
Preceded by Robert Underwood	Delegate to the U.S. House of Representatives from Guam's at-large congressional district 2003–2019	Succeeded by Michael San Nicolas
