= Paul McDonald Calvo =

Governor of Guam from 1979 to 1983

Paul Calvo
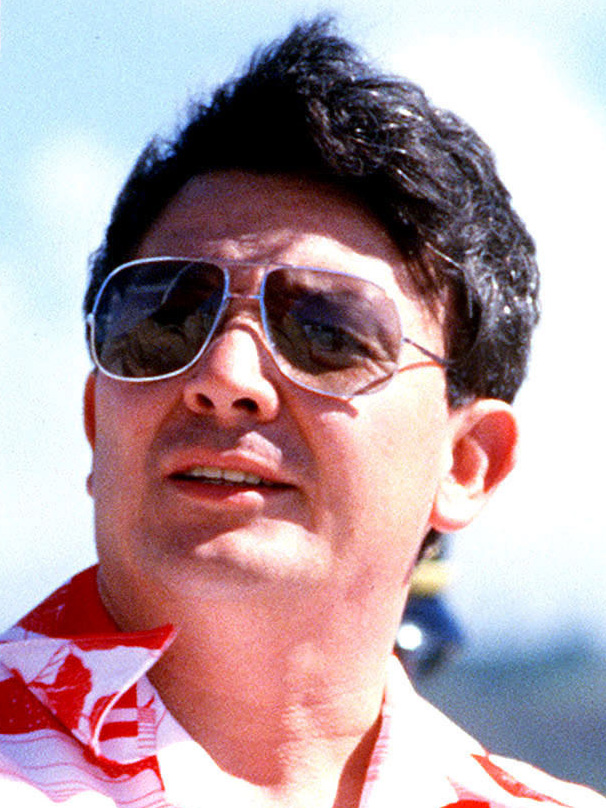
- Calvo in 1979

3rd Governor of Guam
- In office January 1, 1979 – January 3, 1983
- Lieutenant: Joseph Franklin Ada
- Preceded by: Ricardo Bordallo
- Succeeded by: Ricardo Bordallo

Senator of the Guam Legislature
- In office January 4, 1971 – January 6, 1975

Personal details
- Born: Paul McDonald Calvo; July 25, 1934 Hagåtña, Guam, U.S.
- Died: October 16, 2024 (aged 90) Mongmong-Toto-Maite, Guam, U.S.
- Party: Republican
- Spouse: Rose Baza Calvo
- Children: 8; including Eddie Baza Calvo
- Education: Santa Clara University (BS)

Paul McDonald Calvo (July 25, 1934 – October 16, 2024) was an American politician who served as the 3rd governor of Guam from 1979 to 1983. Prior to his time as governor, Calvo served in the Guam Legislature from 1971 to 1975. He was a member of the Republican Party of Guam.

== Early life and education ==
Paul McDonald Calvo was born in Hagåtña, Guam, on July 25, 1934, to and Eduardo Calvo and Veronica Mariano McDonald. His grandfather, Tomas Anderson Calvo, was a member of the Guam Congress in 1917, and his father was a founding member of the Territorial Party. Calvo attended George Washington High School and Peacock Military Academy. He graduated from Santa Clara University with a Bachelor of Science degree in commerce in 1958.

Calvo started working at his family's insurance company in 1958. He and his brothers inherited their father's business when he died in 1963. He formed Calvo Enterprises Inc. with two of his brothers in 1975. He had to divest himself from the company after being elected governor.

== Career ==
Calvo was a founding member of the Republican Party of Guam. Calvo was elected to the Legislature of Guam in 1965, as a Republican. During his tenure in the legislature he was chair of the Finance and Taxation committee. He was the minority leader.

Calvo was elected governor in the 1978 election with Joseph Franklin Ada as his lieutenant governor. Peter Perez Jr. was selected to replace Ada as Calvo's running mate in the 1982 election. This ticket defeated Kurt Moylan and his running mate Frank Blas in the Republican primary. Democratic nominees Ricardo Bordallo and Edward Diego Reyes defeated Calvo and Perez Jr. in the election. The Republicans also lost control of the legislature for the first time in eight years.

On 19 December 1980, Calvo vetoed legislation that would raise legislator's pay raise by 27% to $26,000, but the legislature unanimously voted to override his veto on 31 December. The deficit rose from $10.7 million in 1978, to $83.3 million in 1982. The Guam Oil and Refining Company (GORCO), whose refinery was Guam's only significant industrial entity, suffered from tax issues and the lost of military support after the end of the Vietnam War.

== Personal life ==
Calvo married Rose Baza Calvo, with whom he had eight children, in 1956. His son Eddie Baza Calvo was also elected to the legislature. He died on 16 October 2024.

== Works cited ==
=== Books ===
- Lal, Brij; Fortune, Kate, eds. (2000). The Pacific Islands: An Encyclopedia. University of Hawaiʻi Press. ISBN 082482265X.
- Rogers, Robert (2011). Destiny's Landfall: A History of Guam, Revised Edition. University of Hawaiʻi Press. ISBN 9780824833343.

=== News ===
- "Paul M. Calvo". Marianas Business Journal. 23 October 2024. Archived from the original on 22 November 2026.
- O'Connor, John (16 October 2024). "Family, leaders mourn death of former Gov. Paul M. Calvo". The Guam Daily Post. Archived from the original on 22 November 2026.

=== Web ===
- "Former Governor of Guam, Paul McDonald Calvo". Guam Museum. Archived from the original on 22 November 2026.
- "Gov. Paul McDonald Calvo". National Governors Association. Archived from the original on 26 August 2019.

Party political offices
Preceded by Carlos Camacho	Republican nominee for Governor of Guam; 1978, 1982	Succeeded by Joseph Franklin Ada
Political offices
Preceded by Ricardo Bordallo	Governor of Guam; 1979–1983	Succeeded by Ricardo Bordallo
