= Rosanne Santos Ada =

Former First Lady of Guam (1944–2021)

First Lady of Guam
- In role January 5, 1987 – January 2, 1995
- Governor: Joseph Franklin Ada
- Preceded by: Madeleine Bordallo
- Succeeded by: Geri T. Gutierrez

Personal details
- Born: Rosanne Jacqueline Santos; June 28, 1944 Guam
- Died: March 18, 2021 (aged 76) Yigo, Guam
- Party: Republican
- Spouse: Joseph Franklin Ada
- Children: 3
- Parents: Mariano Barcinas Santos (father); Ana Sablan Borja Santos (mother)
- Occupation: First Lady of Guam
- Other names: Rosanne Ada, Rosanne S. Ada, Rosanne Jacqueline Santos Ada, Rosanne Borja Santos Ada, Rosanna Santos Ada

Rosanne Jacqueline Santos Ada (née Santos; June 28, 1944 – March 18, 2021) was a Guamanian businesswoman who served as the First Lady of Guam from 1987 to 1995.

== Early life and education ==
Rosanne Jacqueline Santos Ada was born on June 28, 1944, in Guam during the Japanese occupation of Guam. At the time of her birth, her parents, Mariano Barcinas Santos and Ana Sablan Borja Santos, and their seven other children were enroute to the Manenggon Concentration Camp. The Japanese occupation of Guam ended on August 10, 1944.

Ada graduated from George Washington High School and went on to earn a Bachelor's degree in Elementary and Special Education from the University of Arizona in 1967.

She furthered her education by earning a Master's degree in Education from the University of Portland, a Catholic university in Oregon.

== Career ==
Ada was a dedicated advocate for people with disabilities and served as the executive director of the Guam Developmental Disabilities Council.

When her husband, Joseph Franklin Ada, was elected Governor of Guam in November 1986, she became the First Lady of Guam. She held this position from January 5, 1987 to January 2, 1995.

== Personal life ==
Ada's husband was Joseph Franklin Ada. They had three children: Eric, Tricia, and Esther.

Ada died on March 18, 2021, in her home in Yigo, Guam. She was laid to rest at Guam Memorial Park in Leyang, Barrigada, Guam.
