= Pacific Ocean theater of World War II =

Theatre of World War II

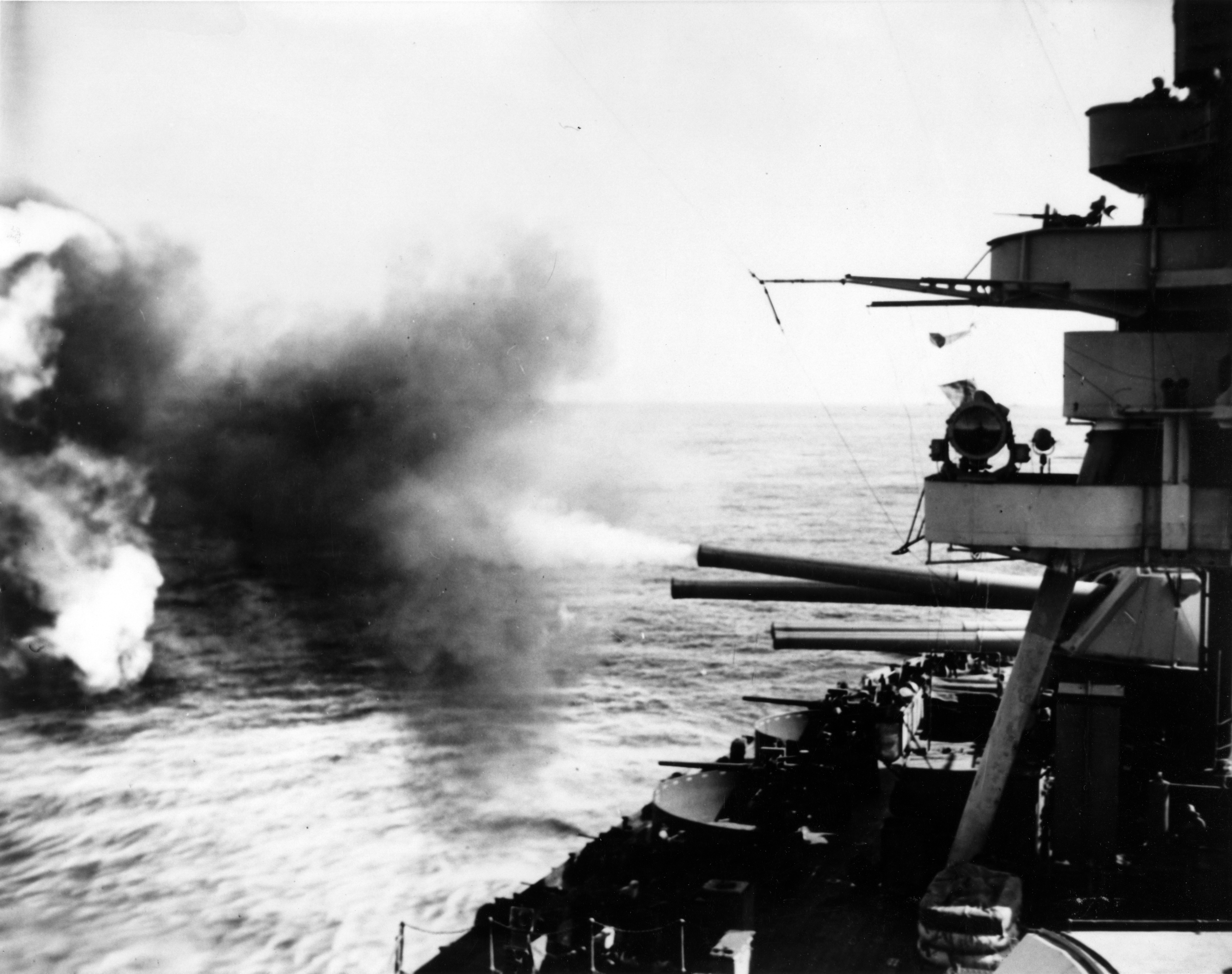
The battleship USS New York firing her main guns on 16 February 1945 in the lead up to the Battle of Iwo Jima

The Pacific Ocean theater of World War II was a major theater of war between the Allied powers and the Empire of Japan during World War II. It was one of four theaters within the overall Pacific War, the largest theater of World War II. The other three theaters were the South West Pacific theater, the Second Sino-Japanese War, and the brief Soviet–Japanese War. The term "Pacific Theater" can refer to the overall Pacific War or the Pacific Ocean theater, depending on context.

== Commands ==
=== Allied ===
The Western Allies' command structure in the Pacific

On March 30, 1942, US Admiral Chester Nimitz was appointed Commander-in-Chief, Pacific Ocean Areas. In the other major theater in the Pacific region, known as the South West Pacific theater, Allied forces were commanded by US General Douglas MacArthur. Both Nimitz and MacArthur were overseen by the US Joint Chiefs, and indirectly by the British-American Combined Chiefs of Staff.

In the Pacific Ocean theater, Japanese forces fought primarily against the United States Navy, the U.S. Army, which had 6 Corps and 21 Divisions, and the U.S. Marine Corps, which had only 6 Divisions. The United Kingdom (British Pacific Fleet), New Zealand, Australia, Canada, and other Allied nations, also contributed forces.

=== Japanese ===
Most Japanese forces in the theater were part of the Combined Fleet (連合艦隊, Rengō Kantai) of the Imperial Japanese Navy (IJN), which was responsible for all Japanese warships, naval aircraft, and marine infantry units. The Rengō Kantai was led by Admiral Isoroku Yamamoto, until he was killed in an attack by U.S. fighter planes in April 1943. Yamamoto was succeeded by Admiral Mineichi Koga (1943–44) and Admiral Soemu Toyoda (1944–45). The General Staff (参謀本部, Sanbō Honbu) of the Imperial Japanese Army (IJA) was responsible for Imperial Japanese Army ground and air units in Southeast Asia and the South Pacific. The IJN and IJA did not formally use joint/combined staff at the operational level, and their command structures/geographical areas of operations overlapped with each other and those of the Allies.

== Campaigns and battles ==
- Hawaiian Islands campaign (7 December 1941 – 7 June 1942)
  - Attack on Pearl Harbor (7 December 1941)
  - Attack on Midway (7 December 1941)
  - Shelling of Johnston and Palmyra (12 December 1941 – 24 December 1941)
  - Operation K (4 March 1942)
  - Battle of Midway (4 June 1942 – 7 June 1942)
- Battle of Wake Island (8 December 1941 – 23 December 1941)
- Aleutian Islands campaign (3 June 1942 – 15 August 1943)
  - Battle of Dutch Harbor (3 June 1942 – 4 June 1942)
  - Landing at Amchitka (12 January 1943)
  - Battle of the Komandorski Islands (27 March 1943)
  - Battle of Attu (11 May 1943 – 30 May 1943)
  - Battle of the Pips (27 July 1943)
  - Operation Cottage (15 August 1943)
- Gilbert and Marshall Islands campaign (17 August 1942 – 23 February 1944)
  - Raid on Makin Island (17 August 1942 – 18 August 1942)
  - Battle of Tarawa (20 November 1943 – 23 November 1943)
  - Battle of Makin (20 November 1943 – 24 November 1943)
  - Battle of Kwajalein (31 January 1944 – 3 February 1944)
  - Operation Hailstone (17 February 1944 – 18 February 1944)
  - Battle of Eniwetok (17 February 1944 – 23 February 1944)
- Mariana and Palau Islands campaign (15 June 1944 – 27 November 1944)
  - Battle of Saipan (15 June 1944 – 9 July 1944)
  - Battle of the Philippine Sea (19 June 1944 – 20 June 1944)
  - Battle of Guam (21 July 1944 – 10 August 1944)
  - Battle of Tinian (24 July 1944 – 1 August 1944)
  - Battle of Peleliu (15 September 1944 – 27 November 1944)
  - Battle of Angaur (17 September 1944 – 22 October 1944)
- Volcano and Ryukyu Islands campaign (19 February 1945 – 22 June 1945)
  - Battle of Iwo Jima (19 February 1945 – 26 March 1945)
  - Battle of Okinawa (1 April 1945 – 22 June 1945)
Map of campaigns and battles in Pacific Ocean theater of World War II

== Gallery ==
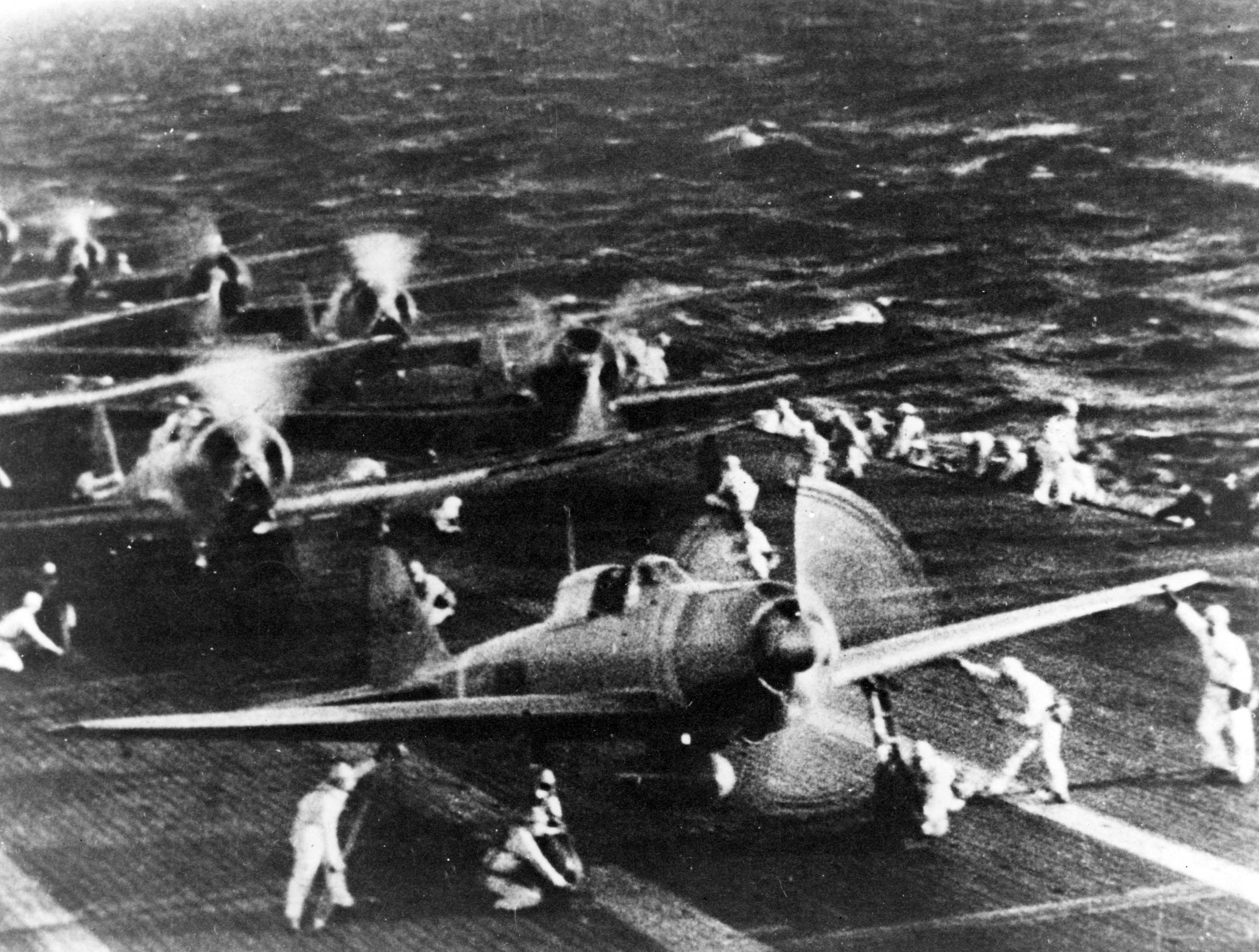
Japanese naval aircraft prepare to take off from an aircraft carrier.

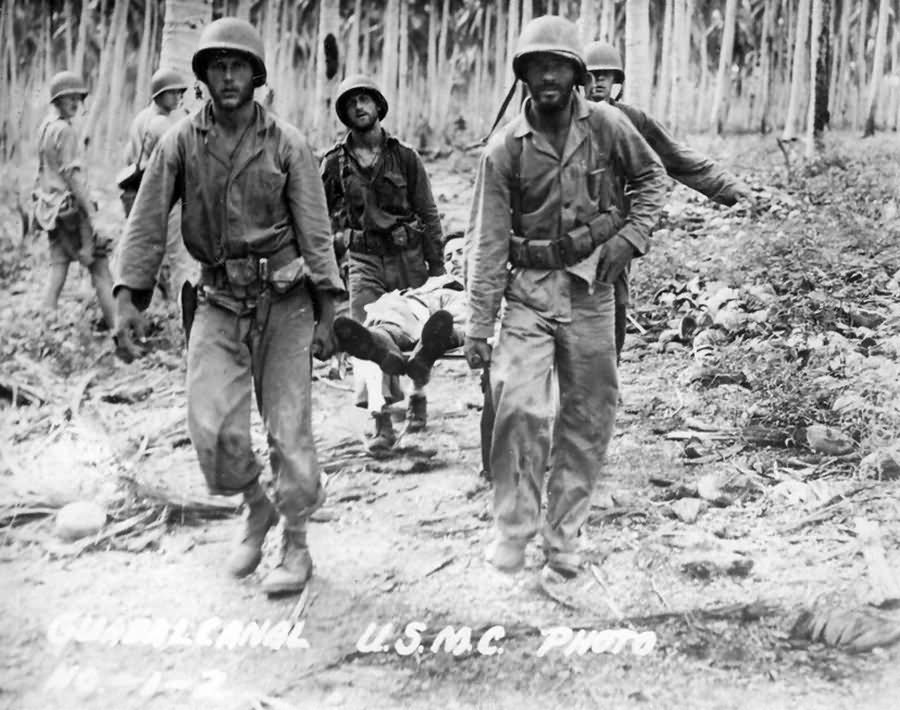
U.S. 5th Marines evacuate injured personnel during actions on Guadalcanal on November 1, 1942.

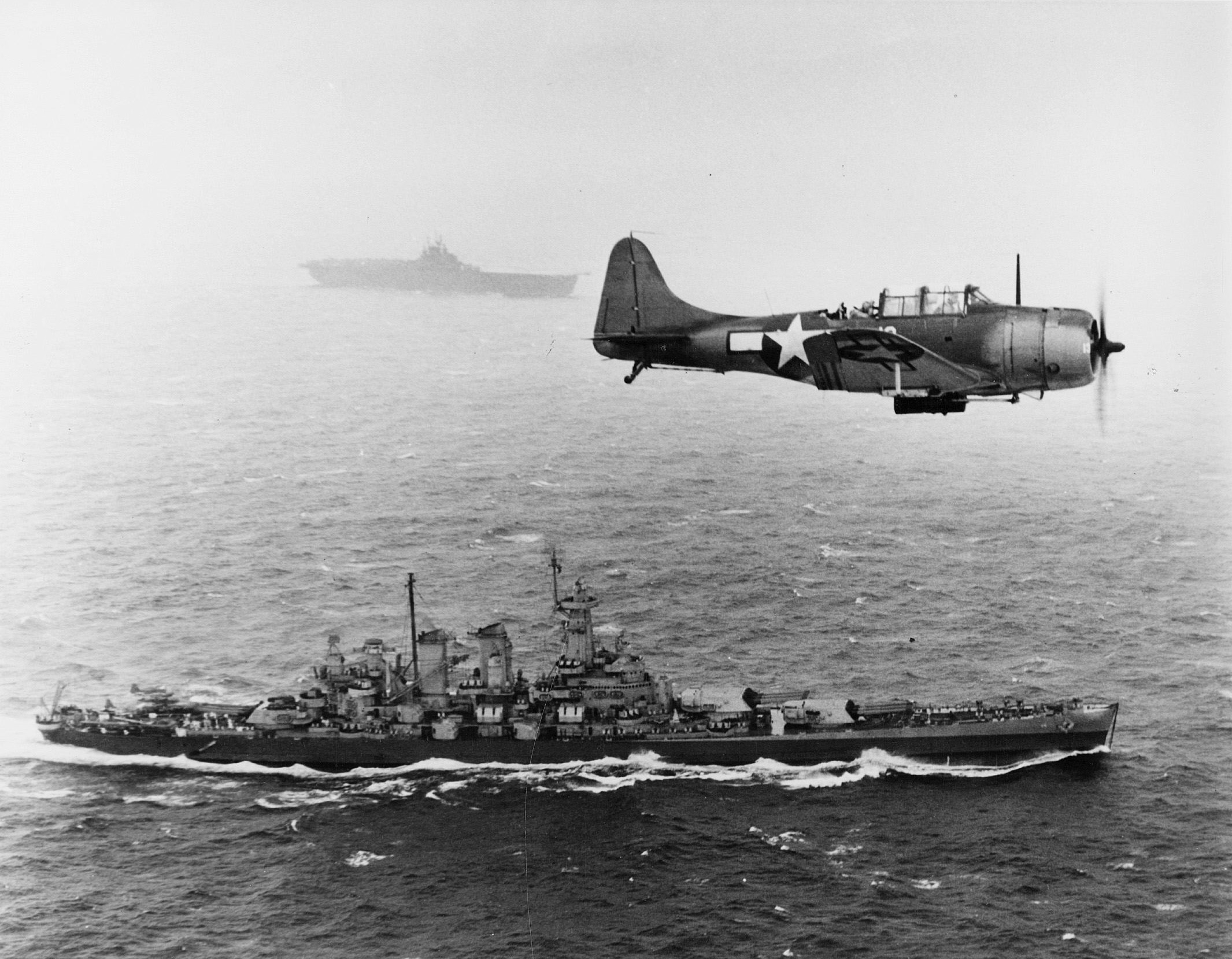
An SBD Dauntless flies patrol over USS Washington and USS Lexington during the Gilbert and Marshall Islands campaign, November 12, 1943.

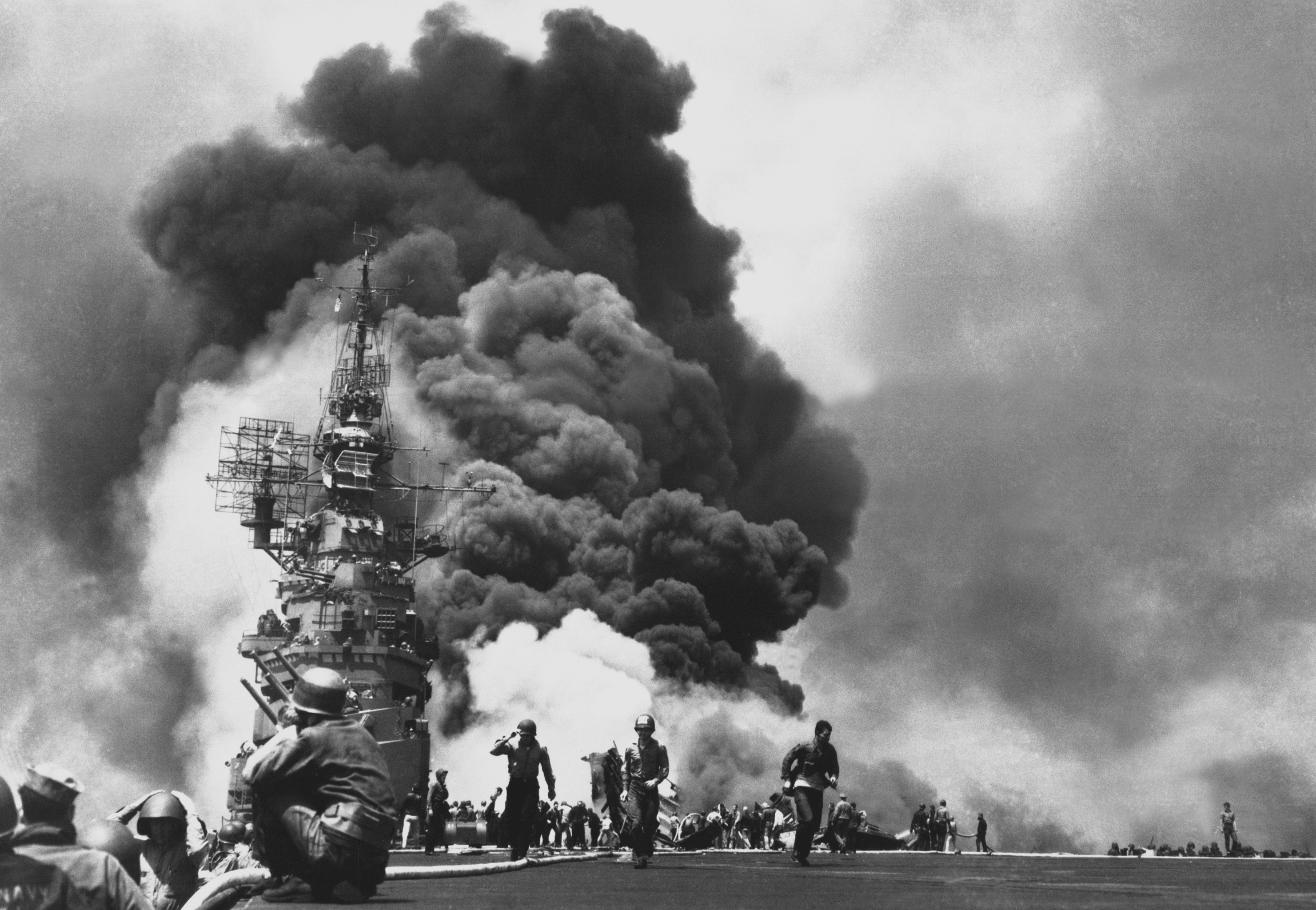
USS Bunker Hill hit by two Kamikazes in thirty seconds on 11 May 1945 off Kyushu
