= Roy Geiger =

US Marine Corps general (1885–1947)

Roy Stanley Geiger
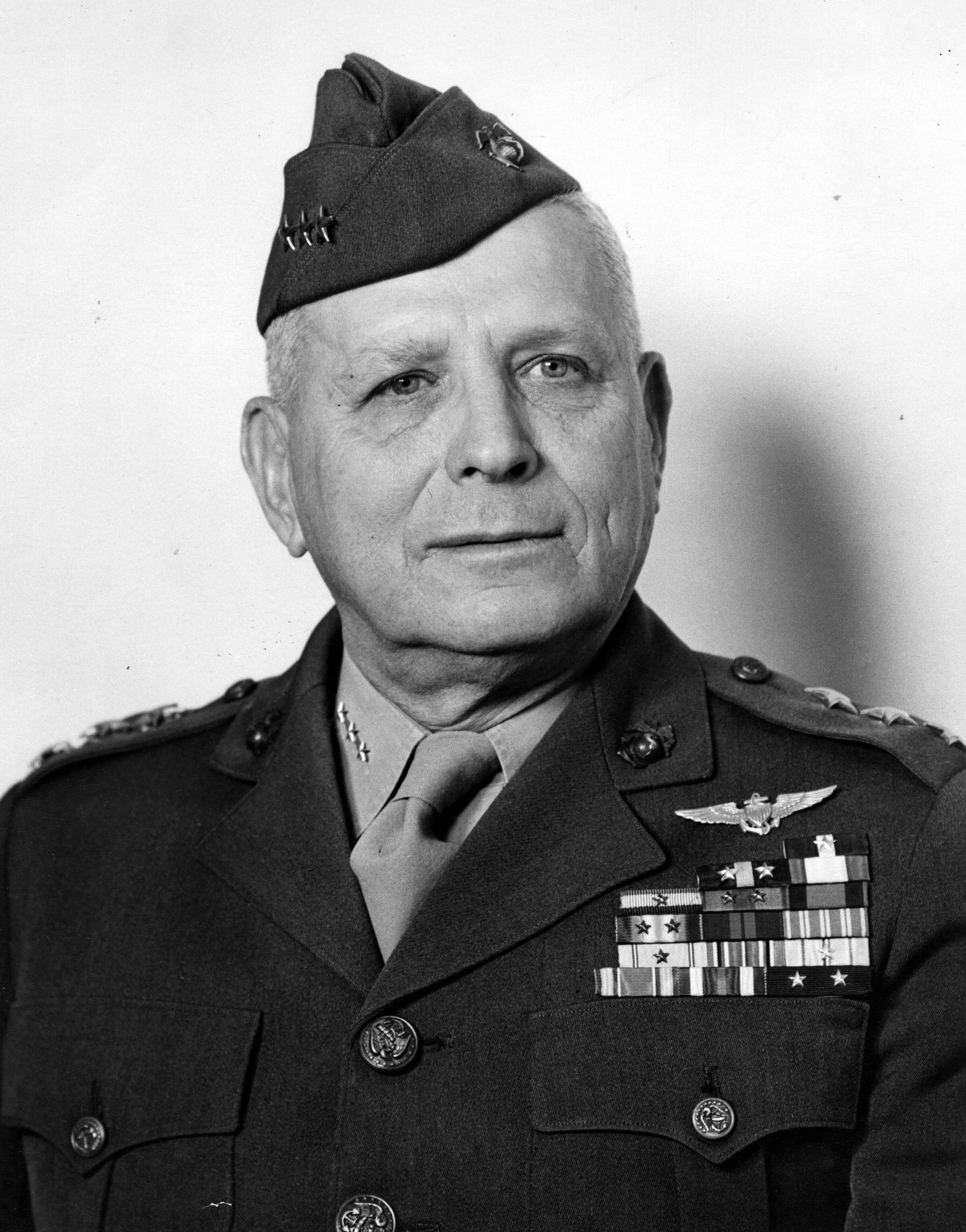
- Lieutenant General Roy S. Geiger, U.S. Marine Corps

1st Military Governor of Guam
- In office July 21, 1944 – August 10, 1944
- Preceded by: Hideyoshi Obata (last Japanese military governors)
- Succeeded by: Henry Louis Larsen

Personal details
- Born: January 25, 1885 Middleburg, Florida, US
- Died: January 23, 1947 (aged 61) Bethesda, Maryland, US
- Resting place: Arlington National Cemetery
- Spouse: Eunice Renshaw Geiger (m. 1917)
- Children: 2
- Nickname: "Jiggs"
- Military career
- Allegiance: United States
- Branch: United States Marine Corps
- Service years: 1907–1947
- Rank: General
- Commands: 1st Marine Aircraft Wing; I Amphibious Corps; III Amphibious Corps; Tenth Army; Fleet Marine Force, Pacific
- Conflicts: Philippine–American War; Banana Wars; Nicaragua intervention; Haiti intervention; World War I; World War II; Battle of Guadalcanal; Battle of Bougainville; Battle of Guam; Battle of Okinawa
- Awards: Navy Cross (2); Navy Distinguished Service Medal (3); Army Distinguished Service Medal

Roy Stanley Geiger (January 25, 1885 – January 23, 1947) was a United States Marine Corps four-star general who served in World War I and World War II. In World War II, he became the first Marine Corps general to lead a field army.

Geiger commanded the III Amphibious Corps in the Battle of Okinawa in 1945 before assuming the command of the U.S. Tenth Army upon the combat death of its commander, Lt. General Simon Bolivar Buckner Jr. Geiger successfully led the Tenth Army until relieved by General Joseph Stilwell.

== Early life ==
Geiger was born in Middleburg, Florida.

== Education ==
Geiger attended Florida State Normal and Industrial College. In 1907, Geiger earned a Bachelor of Laws degree from Stetson University College of Law.

Geiger enlisted in the Marine Corps as a private on November 2, 1907, in St. Paul, Minnesota, and was sent to Naval Station Norfolk for his initial training. Geiger spent most of his enlisted time at the Marine Barracks, Washington, D.C., where he was also promoted to corporal on June 2, 1908. Following a series of professional examinations and the passing of a Naval Medical Board he accepted his commission as a second lieutenant on February 5, 1909.

== U.S. Marine Corps career ==
Following attendance at the Marine Officers' School at Port Royal, South Carolina, he served as a member of the Marine detachments aboard Wisconsin and Delaware. In August 1912, he was assigned to Nicaragua, where he participated in the bombardment, assault and capture of the hills called Coyotepe and Barranca. Further foreign shore duty followed in the Philippines and China with the First Brigade and with the Marine detachment, American Legation, Peking, China, from 1913 to 1916.

In March 1916, Geiger joined Naval Air Station Pensacola, Florida, as a student naval aviator. He successfully completed the course and was designated a naval aviator in June 1917. He was designated Naval Aviator # 49 (Marine Corps Aviator # 5) on June 9, 1917.

=== World War I ===
Further training followed and in July 1918, he arrived in France. He served with 5 Group, Royal Air Force at Dunkirk. He commanded a squadron of the First Marine Aviation Force and was attached to the Day Wing, Northern Bombing Group. He was detached to the United States in January 1919. For distinguished service in leading bombing raids against the enemy, he was awarded the Navy Cross.

=== Development of Marine Corps aviation between the wars ===
From December 1919 to January 1921, he was a squadron commander with the Marine Aviation Force attached to the 1st Provisional Marine Brigade in Haiti. Upon return to the United States and after duty at the Marine Flying Field, Marine Barracks, MCB Quantico, Virginia, he attended Command and General Staff School at Fort Leavenworth, Kansas. He graduated in June 1925. Again he went to foreign shore duty, commanding Observation Squadron Two with the First Brigade in Haiti.

In August 1927, he returned to Quantico as a squadron officer and instructor at the Marine Corps Schools, and in May 1928, was assigned to duty in the Aviation Section, Division of Operations and Training, at Marine Corps Headquarters. After attending the U.S. Army War College and graduating in June 1929, he was ordered to Quantico, where he was assigned duty as commanding officer, Aircraft Squadrons, East Coast Expeditionary Force. He returned to Washington and served as the officer in charge, Marine Corps Aviation from 1931 to 1935, a billet currently held by a lieutenant general that is now known as the deputy commandant for aviation.

In June 1935, he returned to Quantico as commanding officer, Aircraft One, Fleet Marine Force. From June 1939 to March 1941, he was a student at the Senior and the Advanced Courses, Naval War College, Newport, Rhode Island. This was followed with a brief tour of duty in the Office of the Naval Attaché, London.

=== World War II ===
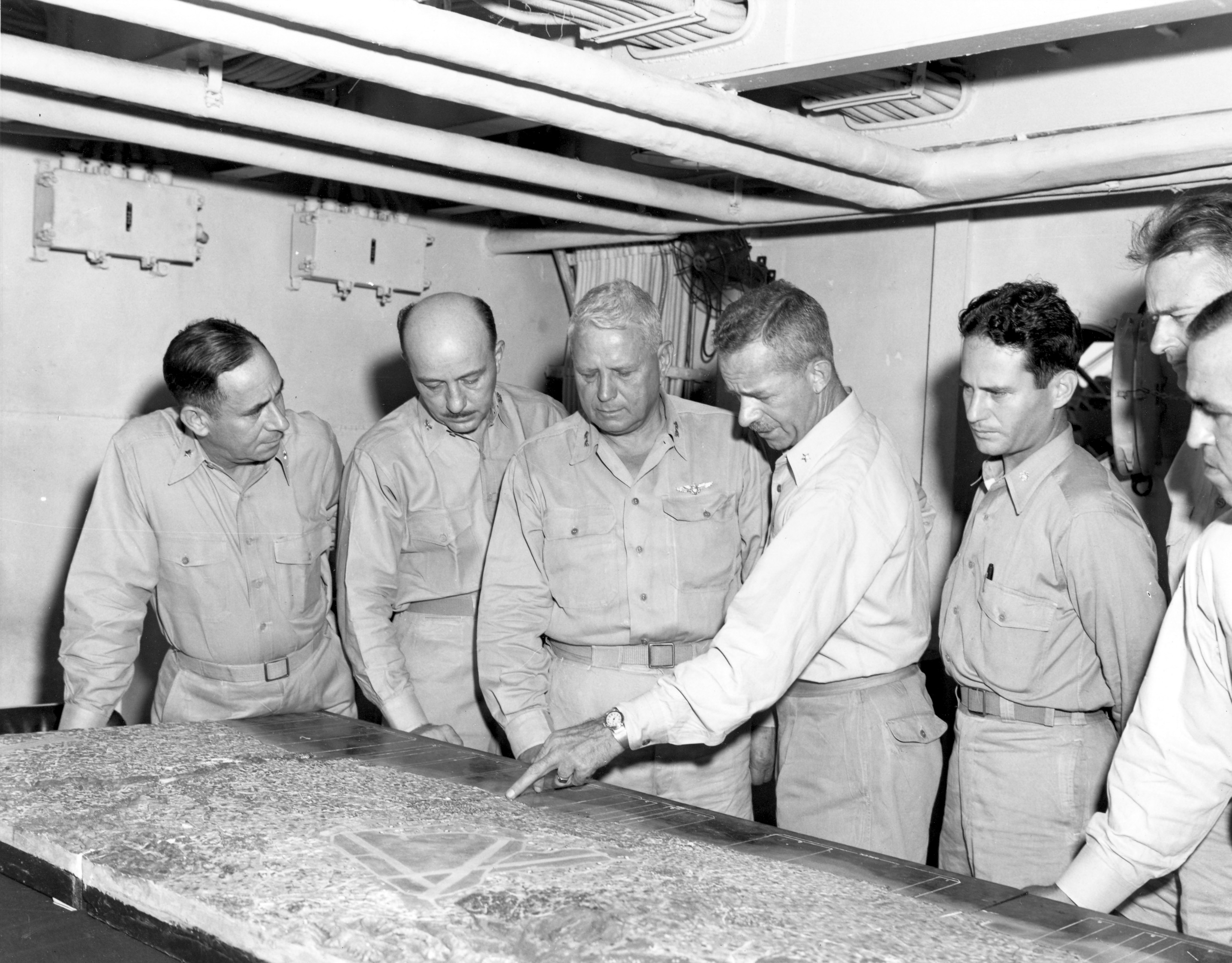
Geiger (third from left) and III MAC staff during the planning of Okinawa operation. From left to right: David R. Nimmer, Walter A. Wachtler, Geiger, Merwin H. Silverthorn, Sidney S. Wade, Francis B. Loomis Jr. and Gale T. Cummings.

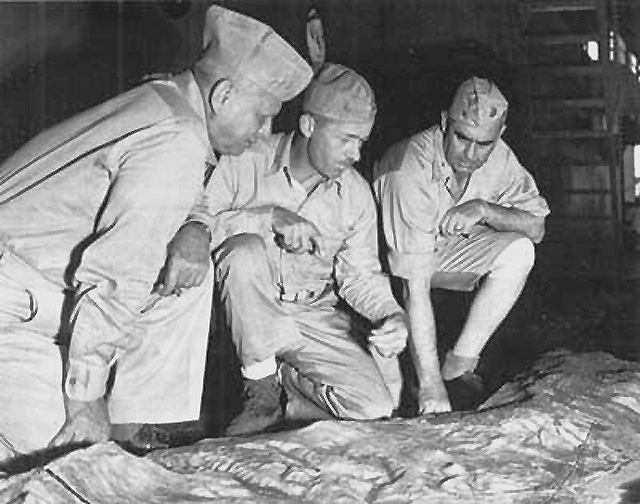
Major General Roy S. Geiger (left), Marine III Amphibious Corps Commander, en route to Guam on board the command ship USS Appalachian. In the center is his Chief of Staff, Colonel Merwin H. Silverthorn and on the right is Brigadier General Pedro del Valle, Corps Artillery commander.

In April 1941, Geiger made his way from Lisbon to Gibraltar, where he changed from civilian clothes to his military uniform. He had lunch with the governor at Government House, in a visit which lifted British morale in Gibraltar. He was on his way to the Western Desert, as the first U.S. military observer attached to the British 8th Army. In August, he became commanding general, 1st Marine Aircraft Wing, Fleet Marine Force, in which capacity he was found upon the United States' entry into World War II.

On September 3, 1942, he was stationed at Guadalcanal to lead the Cactus Air Force during the early part of the Guadalcanal campaign. Until November 4, he was commander of the combined Army, Navy and Marines Air Forces stationed here, of which the 1st Marine Aircraft Wing was part. He was awarded a Gold Star in lieu of a second Navy Cross for his service on Guadalcanal.

His citation reads in part, "Despite almost continuous bombardment by enemy aircraft, hostile naval gunfire and shore based artillery, the combined total of Army, Navy and Marine Corps units stationed at Guadalcanal under Major General Geiger's efficiently coordinated command succeeded in shooting down 268 Japanese planes in aerial combat and inflicting damage on a number estimated to be as great ... Sank six enemy vessels, including one heavy cruiser, possibly sank three destroyers and one heavy cruiser, and damaged 18 other ships, including one heavy cruiser and five light cruisers."

Geiger was recalled to Headquarters Marine Corps in May 1943, to become the Director of Aviation. In November 1943, he returned to the field, this time as commanding general of the I Amphibious Corps and led the corps from November 9, to December 15, 1943, in the Battle of Bougainville, for which he was awarded the Distinguished Service Medal.

Redesignated III Amphibious Corps in April 1944, he led this organization in the invasion and subsequent recapture of Guam during July and August 1944, and in the assault and capture of the southern Palau Islands in September and October of the same year. For those operations he was awarded two Gold Stars in lieu of a second and third Distinguished Service Medal.

Geiger led this corps into action for the fourth time as part of the Tenth Army in the invasion and capture of Okinawa. On June 18, 1945, Geiger assumed command of the Tenth Army following the death in combat of Lt. General Simon Bolivar Buckner Jr. for the final five days of the battle. He was relieved by General Joseph Stilwell. To this day, Geiger remains the only Marine Corps officer to have ever held command of a field army. Geiger was appointed commanding general of the Fleet Marine Force, Pacific in July 1945 and was promoted to lieutenant general. Geiger was the only Marine Corps representative at the surrender of Japan aboard the USS Missouri on September 2, 1945.

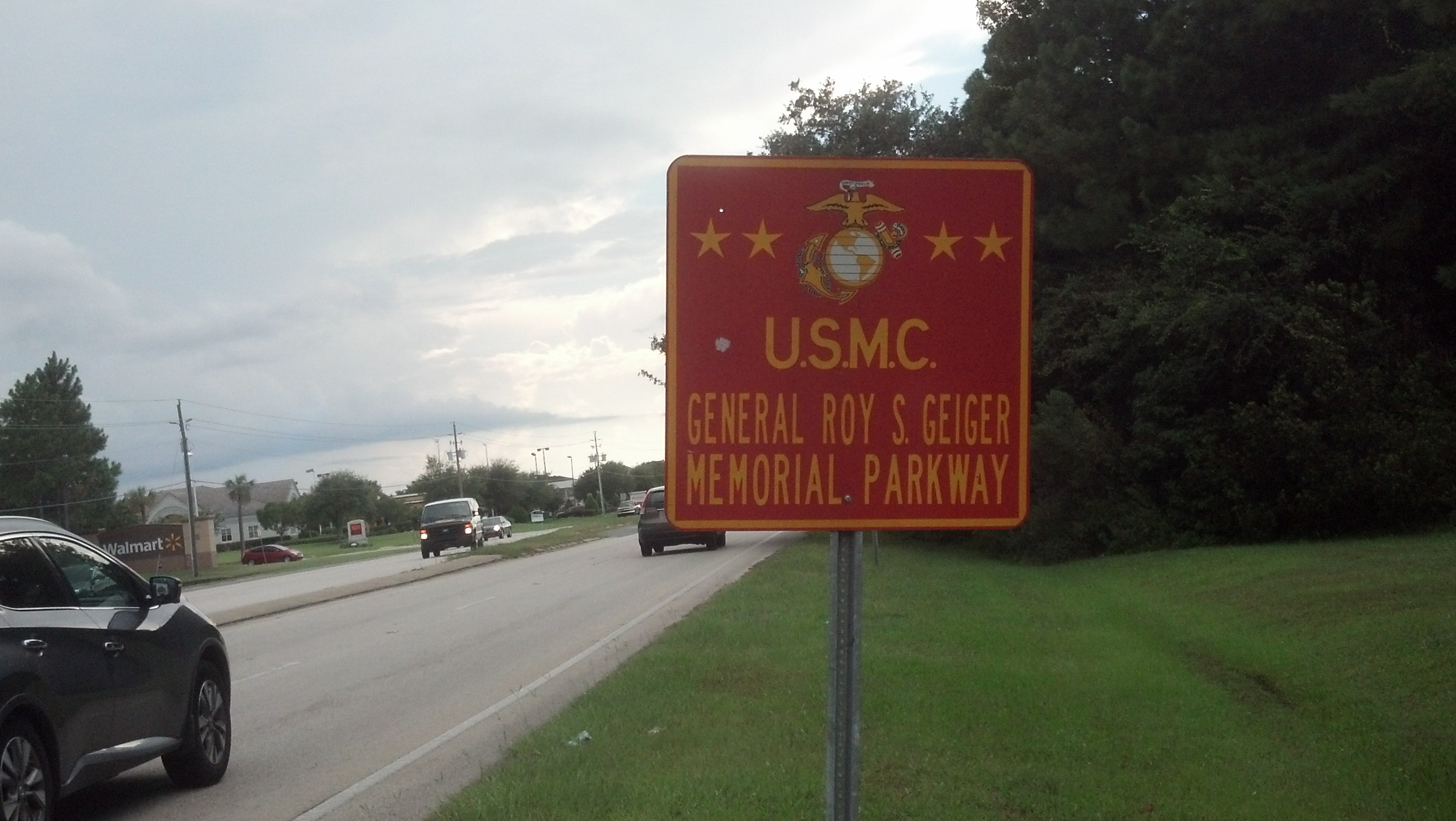
"General Roy S. Geiger Memorial Parkway" sign on County Road 220 in Clay County, Florida, just south of Jacksonville

He returned to Washington, D.C., and Pensacola, Florida, in September and October 1945 before resuming his duties. Geiger was transferred to Headquarters, U.S. Marine Corps in November 1946.

Geiger was promoted to four-star general posthumously by the 80th Congress to be effective from January 23, 1947.

== Awards ==
=== Military awards ===
Geiger's military decorations and awards include:

Naval Aviator Badge
Navy Cross w/ one 5/16" Gold Star		Navy Distinguished Service Medal w/ two 5/16" Gold Stars	Army Distinguished Service Medal
Navy Presidential Unit Citation w/ one 3/16" Bronze Star	Marine Corps Expeditionary Medal w/ two 3/16" Bronze Stars	Nicaraguan Campaign Medal (1912)	World War I Victory Medal w/ Ypres-Lys, France 1918, clasps (two 3/16" Bronze Stars)
Haitian Campaign Medal (1921)	Nicaraguan Campaign Medal (1933)	American Defense Service Medal w/ "Base" clasp (one 3/16" Bronze Star)	American Campaign Medal
Asiatic-Pacific Campaign Medal w/ one 3/16" Silver Star	World War II Victory Medal	Dominican Order of Military Merit; Combat Division 1st Class	Nicaraguan Medal of Distinction and Diploma

=== Army citation ===
For his part in the action on Okinawa he was awarded the Army Distinguished Service Medal. His citation reads in part:

Going ashore with the early landing elements on April 1, 1945, he began a bitter three-month campaign ... with outstanding professional skill, forceful leadership and unswerving determination, he directed his units ... repeatedly disregarding personal safety to secure a first hand estimate of the battle situation and inspiring his men to heights of bravery and accomplishment.

=== Other awards and recognitions ===
- 2002 Gen. Roy Stanley Geiger Memorial Parkway. Dedicated the section of highway formerly known as Clay County Road 220 in Florida.
- 2011 Stetson University College of Law Hall of Fame. Presented posthumously.
- Marine Corps base Camp Geiger in North Carolina is named in his honor.

== Personal life ==
While Geiger was in Pensacola, Florida, he met Eunice Renshaw Thompson, who became his wife, Eunice Renshaw Geiger. They had two children, Roy and Joyce.

Geiger's daughter Joyce Geiger Johnson (1918–2011) trained to become a member of the U.S. Olympic swim team, but pneumonia prevented her from making it to the 1936 Summer Olympics. She was a Red Cross Chairman in Quantico, Virginia. She also became a field director of the Girl Scouts.

Geiger's son was Roy Stanley Geiger Jr. (1920–2014), who was an Army colonel.

Following a short visit to his home in Pensacola, Florida, Geiger was admitted to Bethesda Naval Hospital. On January 23, 1947, Geiger died of complications from lung cancer in Bethesda, Maryland.

Geiger is buried at Arlington National Cemetery, in Arlington, Virginia.

== See also ==
- United States Marine Corps Aviation

Military offices
Preceded by Thomas C. Turner	Officer in Charge, Aviation; November 6, 1931 – May 29, 1935; First term	Succeeded by Ross E. Rowell
Preceded by Louis E. Woods	Commanding Officer of the 1st Marine Aircraft Wing; August 20, 1941 – April 21, 1943	Succeeded by Ralph J. Mitchell
Preceded by Ralph J. Mitchell	Director of Aviation; May 13, 1943 – October 15, 1943; Second term	Succeeded by Louis E. Woods
Preceded by Restored; Title last held by George McMillin	Governor of Guam; July 21 – August 10, 1944	Succeeded by Henry Louis Larsen
Preceded by Simon Bolivar Buckner, Jr.	Commanding General of the Tenth United States Army; 1945	Succeeded by Joseph Stilwell

== Additional sources ==
- "General Roy Stanley Geiger, USMC". Who's Who in Marine Corps History. History Division, United States Marine Corps. Archived from the original on 2011-06-15.
- Camp, Dick (May 2006). "Giants Of The Corps: "Rugged Roy" Geiger And The Northern Bombing Group". Leatherneck Magazine. Marine Corps Association and Foundation. Archived from the original on 2014-04-22.
- Hubler, Richard G.; Dechant, John A (1944). Flying Leathernecks – The Complete Record of Marine Corps Aviation in Action 1941–1944. Garden City, New York: Doubleday, Doran & Co., Inc.
- Kaufman, Roxanne M.; Schmidt, Laurie (2011). 100 Years of Marine Corps aviation: An Illustrated History. Washington, D. C.: U. S. Government Printing Office.
- Wellons, Major James B. (June 2007). "General Roy S. Geiger, USMC: Marine Aviator, Joint Force Commander" (PDF). Masters Thesis. School of Advanced Air and Space Studies, Air University, Maxwell Air Force Base, Alabama. Archived (PDF) from the original on April 22, 2014.
- Willock, Roger (1968). Unaccustomed to Fear – A Biography of the Late General Roy S. Geiger. Marine Corps Association. ISBN 0-940328-05-4.
