= Manenggon =

Concentration camp in Guam in 1944 managed by the Japanese Imperial Army

- Yona, Guam

Site information
- Type: civilian internment camp

Location
- Coordinates: 13°23′57″N 144°45′12″E

Site history
- Built: 1944
- In use: July–August 1944

- Manenggon Concentration Camp
- U.S. National Register of Historic Places
- U.S. National Historic Landmark
- Location within Guam
- Area: 113.4 acres (45.9 ha)
- NRHP reference No.: 16000362
- Added to NRHP: June 14, 2016

Manenggon was a concentration camp operated by the Japanese Imperial Army in 1944 during the Japanese occupation of Guam. The camp was located along a 1.5 miles (2.4 km) stretch of the Ylig River near Yona. Over 10,000 of the native Chamorro people were forcibly marched to the camp in the rain and forced to survive with few resources.

== History ==
Following the end of the first Battle of Guam, on December 10, 1941, Japanese armed forces occupied the island. The Japanese viewed the native Chamorro people as inferior and untrustworthy, and over the course of the occupation subjected them to forced labor and cultural repression. The harsh treatment led to growing animosity from the Chamorro and suspicion from the Japanese about their loyalties.

By early 1944, American forces had made westward gains across the Pacific Ocean, prompting the Japanese to reinforce the island and expand its defenses. The Chamorro were forced to build the airstrips at Orote and Tiyan.

In late June, American forces succeeded in the Battle of Saipan in the nearby Mariana Islands. This blocked communications between the Japanese forces in Guam and the high command in Tokyo. Facing imminent invasion, the Japanese Imperial Army became concerned with the population of over 21,000 hostile Chamorro. On July 4, Colonel Okabe Eichi issued an order calling for the Chamorro populations of the three largest villages to be moved to Mangilao. Within a week, the Chamorro across the island were rounded up and forcibly marched to the village or to other small camps.

The Chamorros were then largely marched to Manenggon with a few sent to smaller camps. A rain storm made the overnight march treacherous. Roughly 10,000 Chamorros, nearly half the island's population, were housed at the main camp. The Chamorro were forced to build their own camp without any building supplies and very little food. Nearby natural food sources were quickly depleted, and the Japanese banned any use of fire so as to not alert American forces.

On July 21, 1944, American forces landed on the southwest beaches of Guam. Disorganized and exhausted, the Japanses forces retreated to the north. General Roy Geiger announced the capture of the entire island on August 10. It is uncertain how the Americans learned of Manenggon or how it was liberated. The survivors at Manenggon followed the Marines to the camp on Mount Tenjo. They then walked to Piti where they were trucked out to refugee camps at Agat.

Few official records were kept on the camp. A small refugee camp was established at Manenggon, renamed Camp Yona, to house about two thousand Chamorro who were interred in Talo'fo'fo to the south.

In 2004, the Manenggon Memorial Peace Park was opened to commemorate the sacrifices of the Chamorro during the war. The location of the camp was added to the National Register of Historic Places in 2016, and it was designated a National Historic Landmark in 2024.

== Notable survivors ==
- Rosanne Santos Ada
- Elizabeth P. Arriola
- Herminia D. Dierking
- Carl Gutierrez
- Pedro C. Sanchez

== See also ==
- List of Japanese-run internment camps during World War II
