= Eunice Renshaw Geiger =

American First Lady of Guam

First Lady of Guam
- In role July 21, 1944 – August 10, 1944
- Governor: Roy Geiger

Personal details
- Born: Eunice Renshaw Thompson; April 30, 1893 Pensacola, Florida, US
- Died: January 4, 1982 (aged 88)
- Spouse: Roy Geiger (m. 1917; died 1947)
- Children: 2
- Occupation: First Lady of Guam
- Other names: Eunice Geiger, Eunice R. Geiger, Eunice R. Thompson, Eunice Thompson, Eunice Renshaw Thompson Geiger

Eunice Renshaw Geiger (April 30, 1893 – January 4, 1982) was an American First Lady of Guam.

== Early life ==
On April 30, 1893, Geiger was born as Eunice Renshaw Thompson in Pensacola, Florida.

== Career ==
In 1944, during World War II at the Battle of Guam, when Roy Geiger recaptured Guam and became the military Governor of Guam, Geiger became the First Lady of Guam on July 21, 1944, until August 10, 1944.

== Personal life ==
Geiger met Roy Geiger while he was in Pensacola, Florida. On 1917, Geiger married Roy Geiger, who later became a General of United States Marine Corps and the First Military Governor of Guam. They had two children, Roy and Joyce. Geiger and her family lived in places including Pensacola, Florida, Philadelphia, Pennsylvania, Haiti, and Newport, Rhode Island.

Geiger's daughter Joyce Geiger Johnson (1918-2011) became a member of the Olympic Swim Team. She was a Red Cross Chairman in Quantico, Virginia. She also became a field director of the Girl Scouts.

Geiger's son is Roy Stanley Geiger Jr. (1920-2014), who was an Army Col.

On January 4, 1982, Geiger died. Geiger is buried at Arlington National Cemetery, in Arlington, Virginia.
