= Shelling of Johnston and Palmyra =

Military event

Shelling of Johnston and Palmyra Atoll
- Part of the Pacific Theater of World War II
Date	December 12 to 24, 1941
Location	Johnston and Palmyra Atoll, Pacific Ocean
Result	Inconclusive; Minor damage to U.S. installations, both islands heavily strengthened

Belligerents
United States	Japan

Commanders and leaders
(United States) Francis B. Loomis Jr.	Unknown

Units involved
1st Defense Battalion; Various U.S. Navy forces Civilian contractors	Unknown

Strength
Marine 5-inch coastal guns	Multiple submarines Possible surface vessels

Casualties and losses
1 Marine wounded Damaged military installations	Possible damage to Japanese ships

Johnston and Palmyra are two atolls in the Pacific Ocean. Johnston was claimed for the US in 1858 and Palmyra in 1859 under the Guano Islands Act. Following the 1941 Attack on Pearl Harbor, Japanese navy forces attacked Allied possessions across the Pacific, including Johnston and Palmyra.

== Background ==
Both islands had been obtained through the Guano Islands Act of 1856, although Palmyra was void of guano. The lack of guano caused Palmyra to pass through the ownership of many different groups throughout the 19th and 20th centuries. Johnston and Palmyra were placed under US Navy control in 1934 by President Franklin Roosevelt. Both islands were garrisoned and Johnston served as a refueling station for passing US Navy ships. Although an airfield was under construction on Johnston, the only aircraft present on the island were Navy PBY patrol planes, usually anchored offshore.

Johnston became noticeable to the Japanese command because of its location. Although it was too close to Hawaii to be amphibiously assaulted, it was near the major Japanese air base in the Marshall Islands. The executive officer of the 1st Marine Defense Battalion, Major Francis B. Loomis Jr., had arrived on Johnston on December 7, 1941. He had been returning by air from an inspection of the American outposts in the Pacific when Pearl Harbor had been attacked. He then took control of the island's garrison.

Following news of the Attack on Pearl Harbor, the civilian contractors already present on Johnston began building more emplacements for the Marines' guns and positions. Six US Navy ships were also on Johnston, practicing their use of the Higgins Boat on Johnston's shore. For the next few days, there was very little activity around both islands.

== The attacks ==
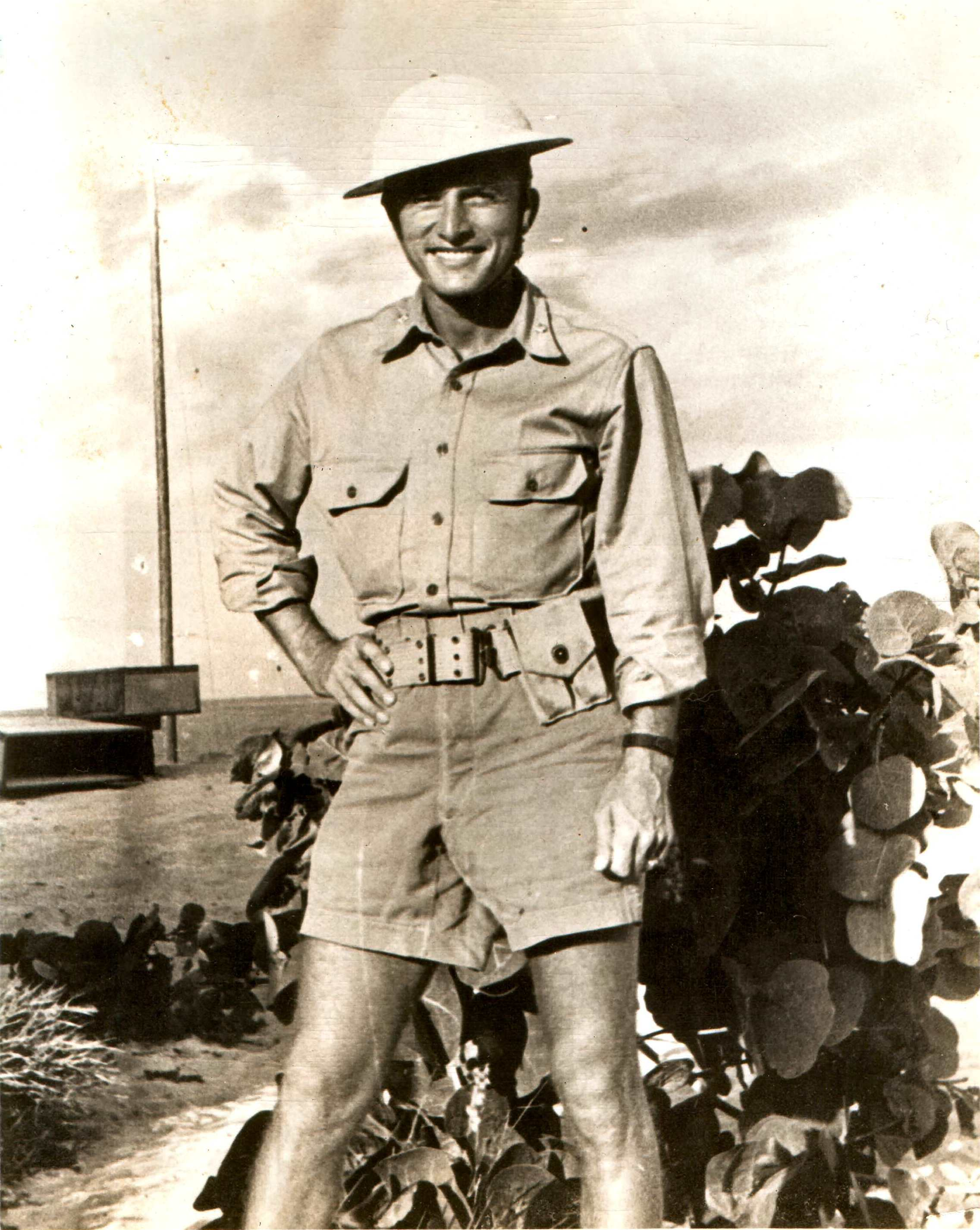
Maj. James Masters, USMC on Johnston, 1942

The first attack on the islands came on December 12, 1941. A Japanese submarine, 8,000 yards offshore, broke the surface and fired star shell clusters over Johnston. The US Marine crews of 5-inch coastal guns tried to find the submarine with star shells, after which the submarine withdrew.

On the night of December 15, a US Navy supply ship, William Ward Burrows, arrived at dusk to drop off supplies for Marines stranded on Wake, and to retrieve civilian contractors and return to Pearl Harbor. Crew members of Burrows and Marines on Johnston spotted a flash at sea. The first bracket of shells landed on Johnston, and at least one hit the powerhouse, causing a fire that engulfed the building. The Marines returned fire for ten minutes until the submarine ceased firing.

There was a similar attack on the night of December 21. A final attack came on the 22nd, when a Japanese submarine fired a star shell cluster and six shells at Johnston, knocking down a homing tower and wounding a Marine. Fire from Marine-crewed coastal batteries forced the submarine to submerge.

Palmyra (located 900 miles southeast of Johnston), was attacked once, on December 24, 1941. A Japanese submarine fired on Palmyra and a US Navy dredge, Sacramento, which sat in the atoll's lagoon. The shells did minor damage to the Sacramento before the submarine was driven back by 5-inch gunfire.

== Aftermath ==
Following the Japanese naval attacks on Johnston and Palmyra, both were heavily reinforced. Johnston was given more heavy guns, machine guns, and an infantry company. Similar precautions were taken with Palmyra. Although they were isolated, the Marine, Navy, and civilian garrisons became the front line of Pearl Harbor's defense while it recuperated. Both islands continued to be garrisoned by Marines throughout the war.
