= Merwin H. Silverthorn =

United States Marine Corps general (1896–1985)

Merwin Hancock Silverthorn
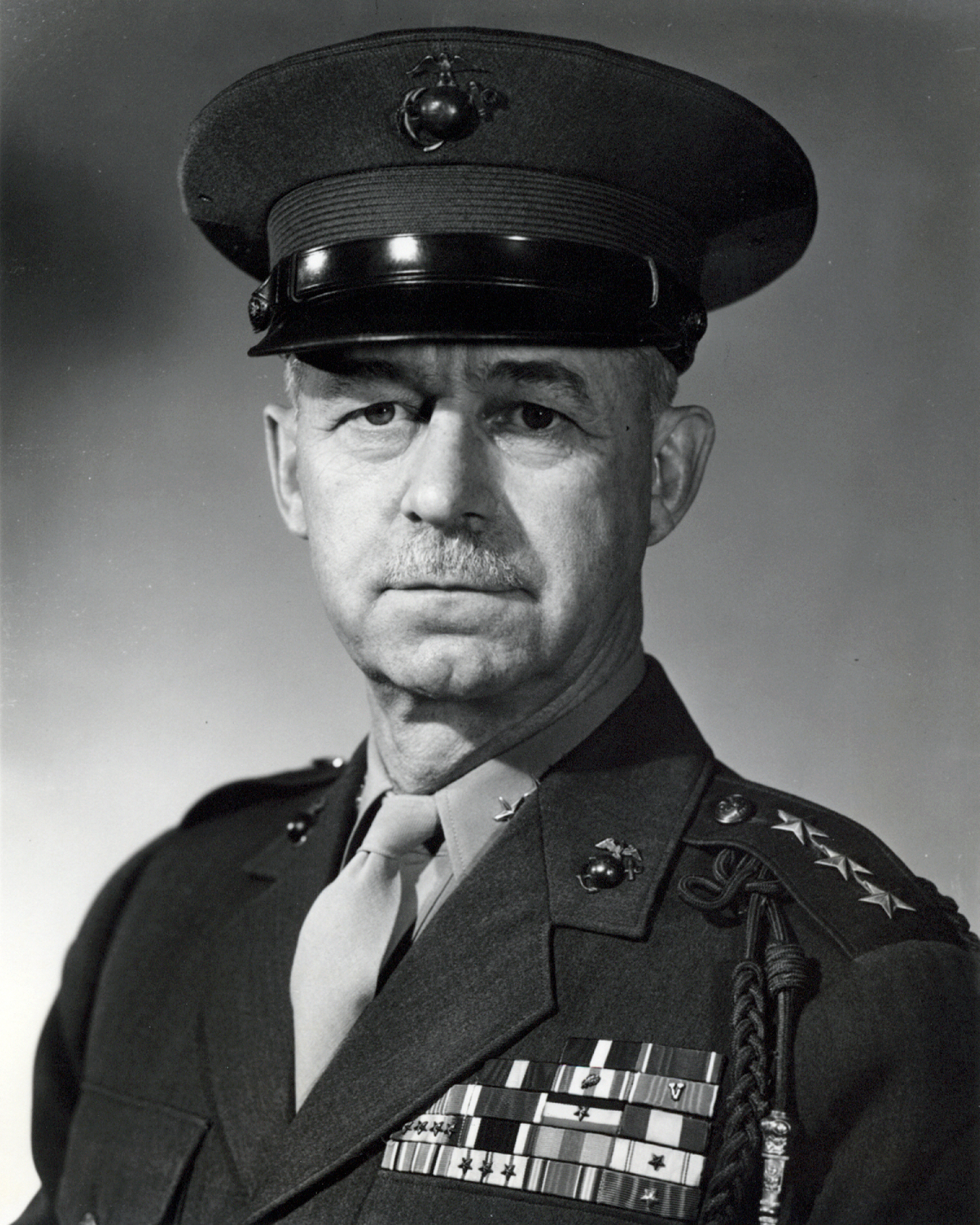
- Merwin H. Silverthorn as a lieutenant general
- Born: September 22, 1896; Minneapolis, Minnesota, U.S.
- Died: August 14, 1985 (aged 88); Bethesda, Maryland, U.S.
- Burial place: Arlington National Cemetery
- Military career
- Allegiance: United States
- Branch: United States Marine Corps
- Service years: 1917–1954
- Rank: Lieutenant general
- Service number: 0-895
- Commands: Assist. Commandant USMC; Marine Corps Reserve; MCRD Parris Island; CoS of Fleet Marine Force Pacific; CoS of III Amphibious Corps
- Conflicts: Pancho Villa Expedition World War I: Battle of Belleau Wood; Battle of Château-Thierry; Second Battle of the Marne; Battle of Soissons; Battle of Blanc Mont Ridge; Meuse-Argonne Offensive; Haitian Campaign World War II: Mariana and Palau Islands campaign; Recapture of Guam; Battle of Peleliu; Battle of Okinawa
- Awards: Navy Cross; Distinguished Service Cross; Navy Distinguished Service Medal; Legion of Merit; Silver Star (2); Purple Heart

Merwin Hancock Silverthorn (September 22, 1896 – August 14, 1985) was a highly decorated Lieutenant General in the United States Marine Corps, Navy Cross recipient.

He was an expert in amphibious warfare and taught courses at Marine Corps training facilities in the 1930s. He served in numerous conflicts including World War I as field commander and during World War II as a senior staff officer. Following World War II, Silverthorn served in many important capacities like Assistant Commandant of the Marine Corps, director of the Marine Corps Reserve or commanding general of the Marine Corps Recruit Depot Parris Island.

== Early career ==
Silverthorn was born on 22 September 1896 in Minneapolis, Minnesota, as the son of Civil War veteran, Asahel C. Silverthorn (1844–1940) and his wife Emma C. Silverthorn (1861–1921). He studied at University of Minnesota, but left the university before graduation and enlisted in the Minnesota National Guard. Serving on Mexican Border during the Pancho Villa Expedition, Silverthorn subsequently enlisted in the Marine Corps as a private on 27 April 1917.

=== World War I ===
After basic training he was assigned to the newly created 5th Marine Regiment. Silverthorn sailed to France as a member of 16th Company, 3rd Battalion, 5th Marines. He was promoted to sergeant and transferred to the 45th Company of the same battalion and participated in the Battle of Belleau Wood.

Silverthorn distinguished himself and received a battlefield commission as a second lieutenant on 9 June 1918. To his new rank, he was appointed platoon leader in the 20th Company, 3rd Battalion. Silverthorn subsequently led his platoon during the battle and was decorated with the Silver Star for gallantry in action.

He commanded his platoon during the Battle of Château-Thierry, Battle of Soissons and Second Battle of the Marne. Silverthorn was ordered to Army school for further training during the August 1918.

He returned in the middle of September and subsequently commanded his platoon during the Battle of Blanc Mont Ridge. Silverthorn was decorated with his second Silver Star for his leadership during the beginning of the battle. During the combats near the village of St. Etienne on 4 October 1918, he carried an important message, at a critical time, to his battalion commander under heavy machine-gun and shell fire, exhibiting extraordinary heroism and disregard for his personal safety. After being wounded, he then continued the attack. For his actions, Silverthorn was decorated with the Distinguished Service Cross and later with the Navy Cross. He was also decorated with the French Croix de guerre 1914–1918 with Gilt Star and promoted to the rank of first lieutenant.

=== Interwar period ===
After the war, Silverthorn remained in the Europe and participated in the Allied occupation of the Rhineland and 'Pershing's Own' E Company, 3rd Army Composite Regiment until September 1919. He subsequently returned to the United States and was assigned to the Marine Barracks at Mare Island, California. Silverthorn served there until April 1921, when he was transferred to the Marine Barracks at Quantico. He was subsequently promoted to the rank of captain on 1 July 1921.

At the beginning of May 1923, Silverthorn was assigned to the 1st Brigade of Marines and sent to Haiti in March 1924, where he served as district commander within Gendarmerie d'Haïti at Aux Cayes and later as chief of police at Port-au-Prince. In this capacity, Silverthorn was responsible for the training and organizing of police units. He returned to the States in May 1926 and was appointed assistant quartermaster at Quantico Base, Virginia.

Silverthorn was transferred to the Marine Barracks at Guam in April 1930 and appointed to the same role as at Quantico.

== World War II ==
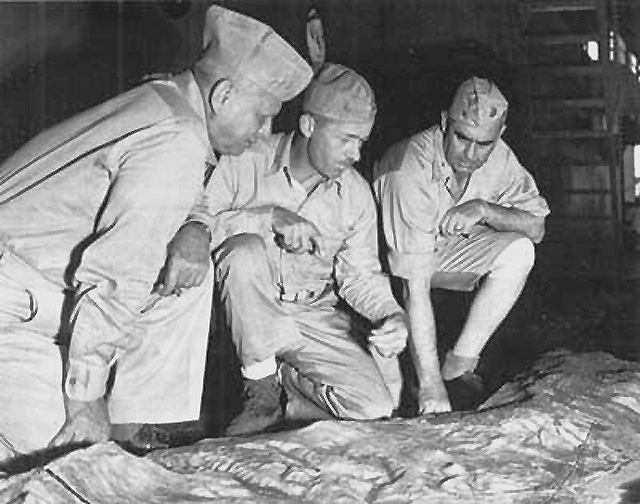
MajGen Roy S. Geiger (left), Marine III Amphibious Corps Commander, En route to Guam on board the command ship USS Appalachian. In the centre is his Chief of Staff, Colonel Merwin H. Silverthorn and on the right is BrigGen Pedro del Valle, Corps Artillery commander.

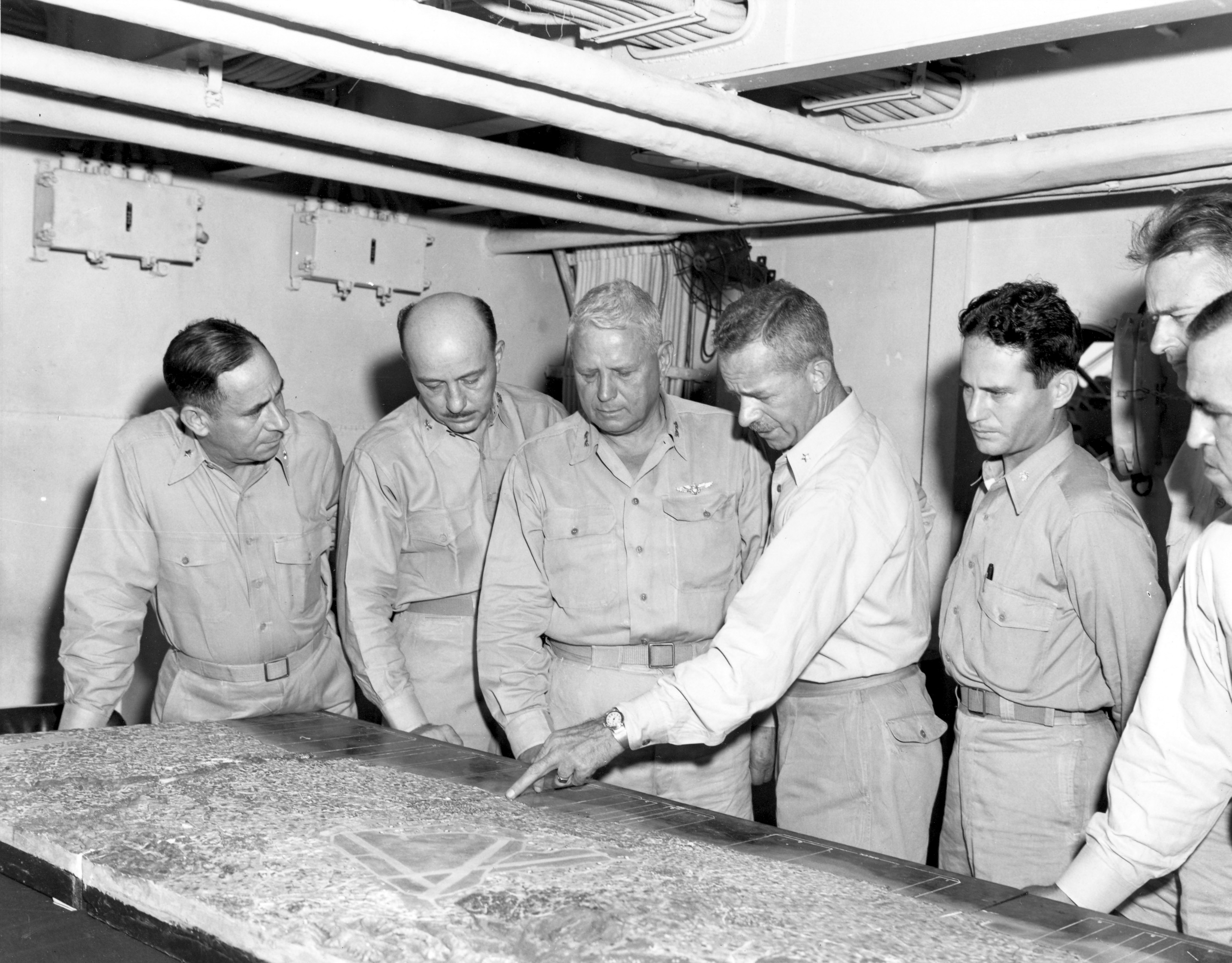
Silverthorn (fourth from left) and III MAC staff during the planning of Okinawa operation. From left to right: David R. Nimmer, Walter A. Wachtler, Roy S. Geiger, Silverthorn, Sidney S. Wade, Francis B. Loomis Jr. and Gale T. Cummings.

At the time of the Japanese Attack on Pearl Harbor, Silverthorn served still in Washington, D.C., at War Plans Section – Operations Department, Navy Department under Admiral Ernest King. He was promoted to the rank of colonel in January 1942 and transferred as Naval member to the Joint U.S. Strategic Committee, Joint Chiefs of Staff. Silverthorn remained in this capacity until June 1943, when he was assigned to the Army Navy Staff College as chief of the Amphibious Warfare Section. For his service in this capacity, he was decorated with the Army Commendation Medal at the end of his assignment in January 1944.

Silverthorn was then finally transferred to the Pacific theater and appointed chief of staff of I Marine Amphibious Corps under Lieutenant General Roy Geiger. He relieved Brigadier General Oscar R. Cauldwell in this capacity, while stationed at Guadalcanal. The I Marine Amphibious Corps was redesignated III Amphibious Corps in April 1944 and started to prepare for Mariana and Palau Islands campaign.

At the end of July 1944, Silverthorn participated in the Recapture of Guam and made several trips to the front line positions to secure necessary information and to give assistance and advice to organization commanders. For the planning and staff work during the Guam operation, Silverthorn received the Legion of Merit with Combat "V".

The next important battle came in the middle of September 1944, when III Marine Corps launched the Battle of Peleliu. Silverthorn distinguished himself again during the planning and execution of the campaign and was promoted to the rank of brigadier general in December 1944. He later participated in the Battle of Okinawa in April 1945 and received the Navy Distinguished Service Medal for his service during Peleliu and Okinawa campaign.

== Later career ==
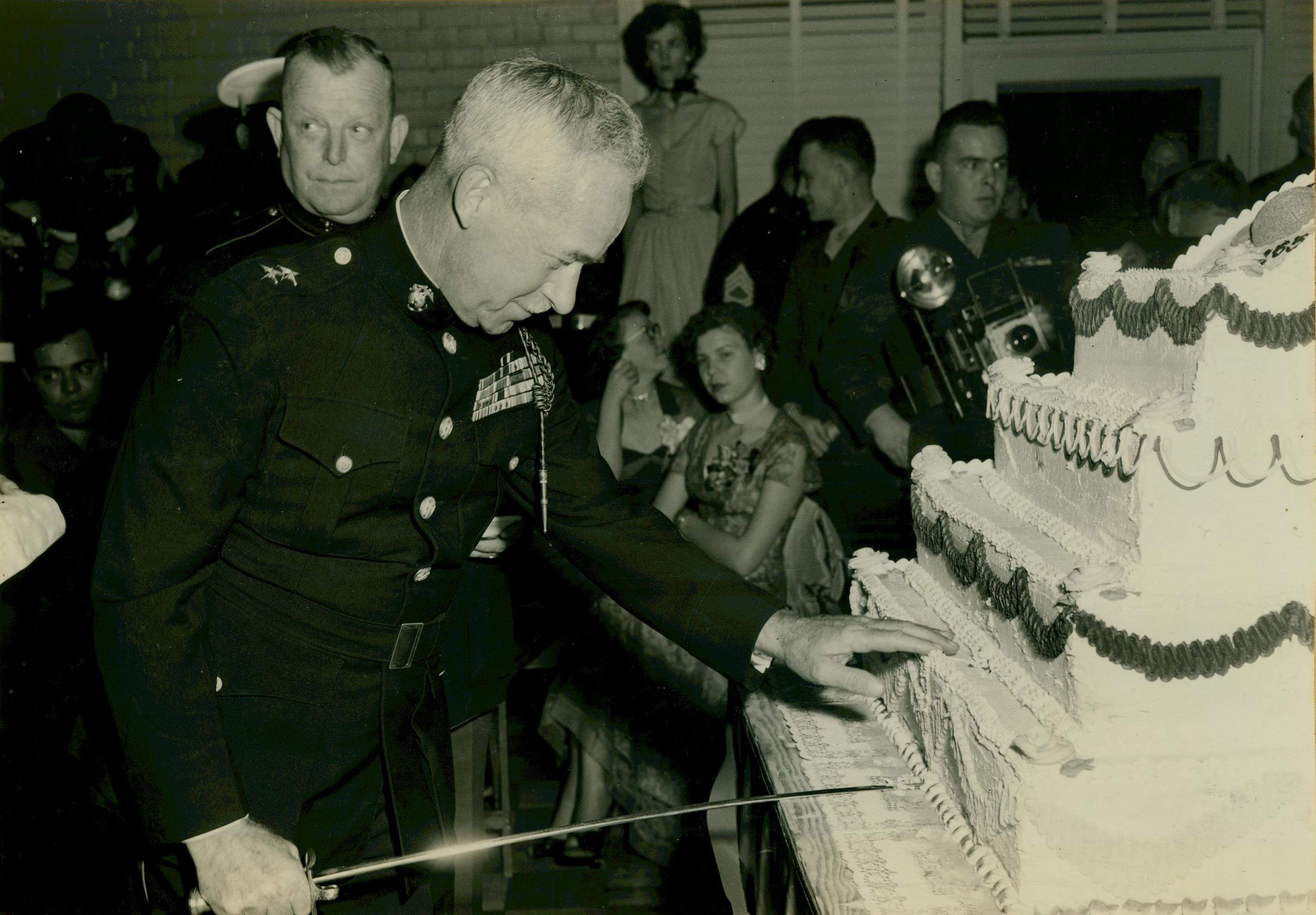
Commanding general of the MCRD Parris Island, Major General Silverthorn cuts the Marine Corps Birthday cake in 1953.

Silverthorn remained on active service after the war and was appointed to the capacity of chief of staff, Fleet Marine Force, Pacific. He served in this capacity until September 1946, when he was reassigned as commander of the Troop Training Unit, Training Command, Amphibious Forces, Atlantic Fleet, located at Naval Amphibious Base Little Creek, Virginia.

During September 1947, Silverthorn was transferred to Washington, D.C., where he was appointed a Marine Corps liaison officer with the Office of the Chief of Naval Operations under Fleet admiral Chester W. Nimitz. He remained in this capacity until May 1949, when he was promoted to the rank of major general and appointed director of the Marine Corps Reserve within Headquarters Marine Corps. Under his command, Marine Corps Reserve grew from 38,403 to 123,000 reservists.

A great honor and also responsibility came in July 1950, when Silverthorn was appointed Assistant Commandant of the Marine Corps, succeeding Major General Oliver P. Smith in this capacity. For his new duties, he was promoted to the temporary rank of lieutenant general on 22 February 1951. Final duties came in February 1952, when he was appointed commanding general of the Marine Corps Recruit Depot Parris Island, South Carolina.

== Retirement ==
He was placed on the retired list on 30 June 1954 and was also advanced to the rank of lieutenant general for having been specially commended in combat.

After his retirement from the Marine Corps, Silverthorn served as an assistant director of the Office of Defense Mobilization within Executive Office of the President from July 1956. He resigned from this capacity during September 1957. He was later active in the International Christian Leadership and served as its vice president.

Lieutenant General Merwin Hancock Silverthorn died of cancer on 14 August 1985, in Bethesda Naval Hospital, Maryland and is buried in Arlington National Cemetery. Each of his sons were career Marine officers:

- Colonel Merwin H. Silverthorn Jr. (1920–2008)
- Lieutenant Colonel Russell Lane Silverthorn (1922–2013)
- Captain Robert Sterner Silverthorn (1928–2013)

== Decorations ==

1st Row	Navy Cross		Distinguished Service Cross	
2nd Row	Navy Distinguished Service Medal	Silver Star with Oak leaf cluster	Legion of Merit with Combat "V"	Army Commendation Medal
3rd Row	Purple Heart	Navy Presidential Unit Citation with one star	Marine Corps Expeditionary Medal	Mexican Border Service Medal
4th Row	World War I Victory Medal with four clasps	Army of Occupation of Germany Medal	American Defense Service Medal with Fleet clasp	American Campaign Medal
5th Row	Asiatic-Pacific Campaign Medal with three 3/16 inch service stars	World War II Victory Medal	National Defense Service Medal	French Croix de guerre 1914–1918 with Gilt Star
