= Francis B. Loomis Jr. =

U.S. Marine Corps Major General

Francis Butler Loomis Jr.
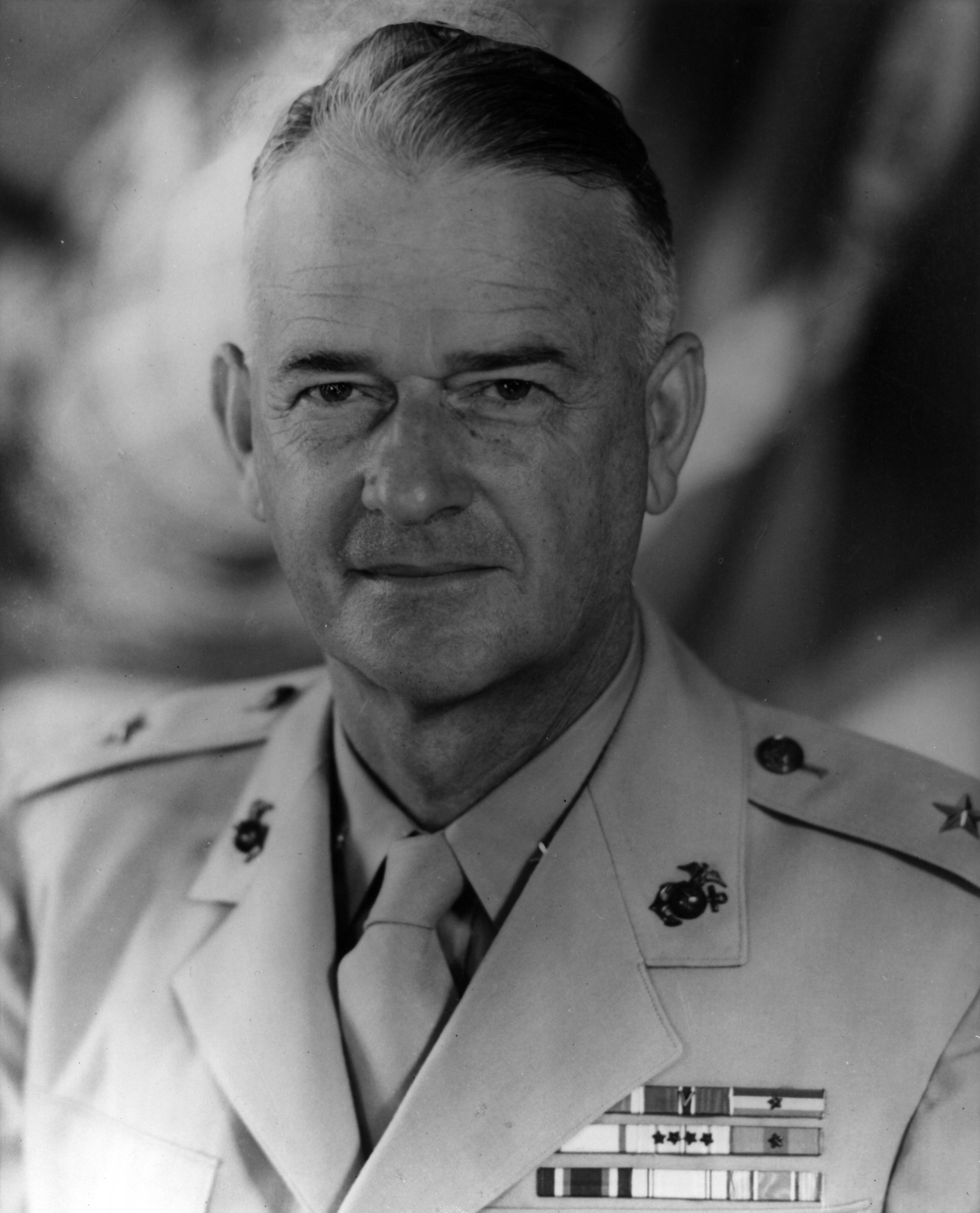
- Loomis Jr. as brigadier general, USMC
- Born: June 21, 1903; Washington, D.C., US
- Died: December 31, 1989 (aged 86); Oceanside, California, US
- Burial place: Ashes scattered at sea
- Relatives: Francis B. Loomis (father)
- Military career
- Allegiance: United States of America
- Branch: United States Marine Corps
- Service years: 1926–1956
- Rank: Major General
- Service number: 0-4134
- Commands: Force Troops, FMFLANT; S-4 of III Marine Amphibious Corps; 15th Defense Battalion
- Conflicts: Haitian Campaign; Yangtze Patrol; World War II: Shelling of Johnston and Palmyra; Battle of Roi-Namur; Recapture of Guam; Battle of Peleliu; Battle of Okinawa
- Awards: Legion of Merit; Bronze Star Medal

Francis Butler Loomis Jr. (June 21, 1903 – December 31, 1989) was a decorated officer of the United States Marine Corps, who reached the rank of major general. He is most noted as executive officer of the 1st Defense Battalion during the Shelling of Johnston and Palmyra and later as Logistic Officer of III Marine Amphibious Corps during Battle of Okinawa. He was the son of United States Assistant Secretary of State, Francis B. Loomis.

== Early career ==
Francis B. Loomis Jr. was born on June 21, 1903, in Washington, D.C., the son of United States Assistant Secretary of State, Francis B. Loomis and his wife Elizabeth Mast Loomis. His family moved to Springfield, Ohio, and Loomis Jr. attended grade school there. He later lived in California and attended high school in San Mateo, before he was appointed to the United States Naval Academy in Annapolis, Maryland, in 1920. However problems with pneumonia forced him to resign in 1922.

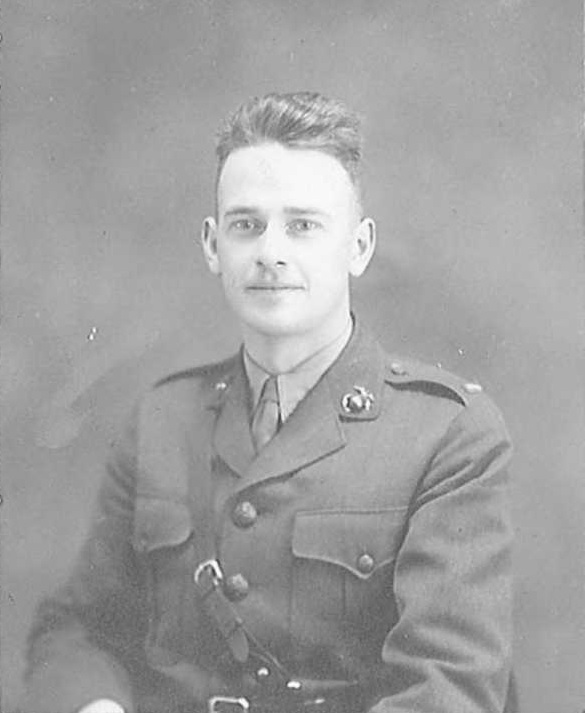
Loomis as young lieutenant in 1926

Following his recuperating, Loomis enrolled at Stanford University and graduated with Bachelor of Science degree in 1924. While at studies, Loomis entered the Naval Reserve Officers Training Corps and was commissioned Ensign in the Navy Reserve in 1924. He subsequently entered the Marine Corps and was commissioned second lieutenant on July 21, 1926. As any other newly commissioned Marine officer, he was sent to the Basic School at Philadelphia Navy Yard for officer training course.

Loomis finished the course in February 1927 and sailed for China within Composite Expeditionary Force in April of that year. While in China, he was appointed commander of the machine gun platoon and later was transferred as Student naval aviator to the Marine Observation Squadron 10. He was ordered back to the United States in September 1928 and was assigned to the flight training at Naval Air Station Pensacola, Florida. Loomis earned his wings in August 1929 and was assigned to the aviation duty at San Diego, where he remained until January 1931. He was subsequently ordered to the Marine Observation Squadron 9 and sent to Haiti.

However, his sight began worsening and he was declared unfit for aviation duty. Loomis returned to the United States in March 1932 and transferred back to the Marine Corps Ground Units. During September 1932, he was assigned to the 4th Marine Regiment and sailed again to China, where he was stationed in Shanghai until May 1935. Upon his return home, Loomis was assigned to the Marine Corps Schools at Marine Barracks Quantico, where he attended Base defense weapons course. He finished the course in August 1936 and was promoted to the rank of captain at the same time. Loomis was subsequently transferred to San Diego and appointed Machine gun company commander within 6th Marine Regiment. The 6th Marines sailed for expeditionary duties in China in August 1937 and Loomis was stationed in Shanghai as the part of defense forces of the International Settlement during Second Sino-Japanese War.

== World War II ==
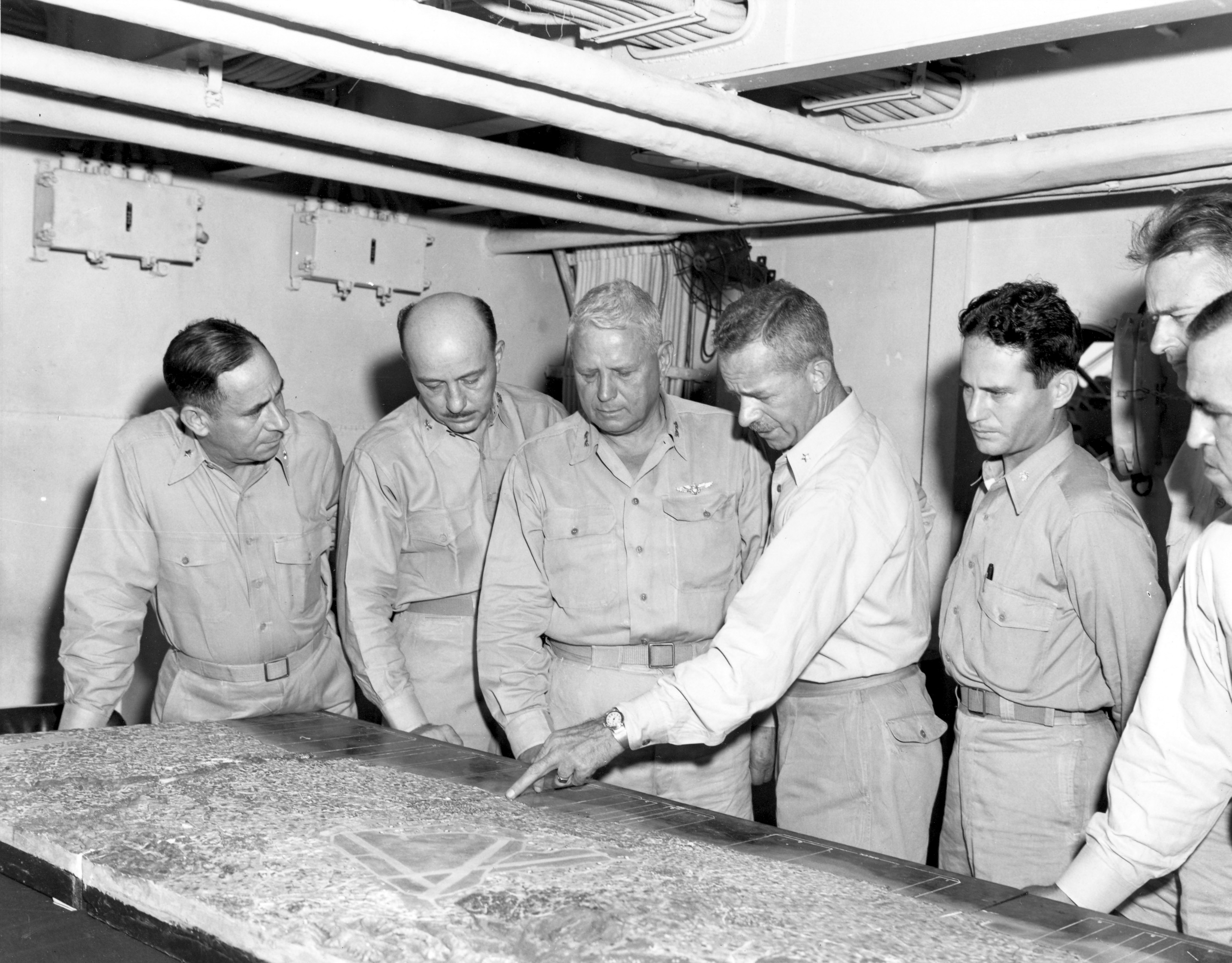
Loomis (second from right) and III Marine Amphibious Corps staff during the planning of Okinawa operation. From left to right: David R. Nimmer, Walter A. Wachtler, Roy S. Geiger, Merwin H. Silverthorn, Sidney S. Wade, Loomis and Gale T. Cummings.

He returned to San Diego in April 1938 and was appointed commanding officer of the Marine Detachment aboard the cruiser USS Pensacola. After two years at sea, Loomis returned once more to San Diego in July 1940 and after promotion to the rank of major, he was appointed commanding officer of the 2nd Artillery Group in March 1941. His unit was transferred to Naval Station Pearl Harbor in August 1941 and subsequently disbanded. Loomis was subsequently appointed executive officer of the 1st Defense Battalion under Lieutenant Colonel Bertram A. Bone.

At the time of Japanese Attack on Pearl Harbor on 7 December 1941, Loomis was on the inspection trip at Johnston Atoll. As senior marine officer present, he assumed command of all forces on the atoll and despite the construction of the fortifications was incomplete, units under his command were able to repel Japanese vessels. For his service in this capacity, Loomis has been decorated with Bronze Star Medal with Combat "V".

Loomis returned to Hawaii at the beginning of August 1942 and was appointed operations officer to the commanding general of the Marine Garrison Force, Major General Harry K. Pickett. He was ordered to the Camp Lejeune in January 1943, promoted to the rank of lieutenant colonel and took command of the 1st Airdrome Battalion. He moved with this command back to Hawaii in September 1943, and his unit was subsequently redesignated as 15th Defense Battalion in October 1943.

He subsequently led his unit during the final phase of the Battle of Roi-Namur at the beginning of February 1944 and remained as occupation force on the Kwajalein and Majuro Atolls. Loomis relinquished his command to Lt. colonel Peter J. Negri on May 5, 1944. He was subsequently assigned to the staff of the III Marine Amphibious Corps (IIIMAC) under Major General Roy S. Geiger and participated in the Recapture of Guam at the end of July 1944. Following the battle, Loomis succeeded Lt. colonel Frederick L. Wieseman as Logistic officer of the III MAC on August 10, 1944.

For his new command, Loomis has been promoted to the rank of colonel and subsequently participated with this command in the Peleliu operation in the fall of 1944 and later during April 1945 also in the largest amphibious assault in the Pacific War during World War II, Battle of Okinawa. For his distinguished service in this capacity, he was decorated with Legion of Merit with Combat "V".

== Later career ==
When General Geiger was appointed commanding general of the Fleet Marine Force Pacific, Loomis was clear choice as his logistic officer and assistant chief of staff. He was ordered back to the United States in January 1946 and assigned to the office of the Chief of Naval Operations in Washington, D.C. In this capacity, he served under Admiral Ernest J. King in connection with base defense operational readiness.

However, change of orders came in December 1946, when he was transferred to San Francisco, California, and appointed senior inspector at the Headquarters of the Department of Pacific under general Keller E. Rockey. Loomis remained in this capacity until July 1949, when he returned to the Chief of Naval Operations in Washington, D.C., as Marine Corps liaison officer for guided missiles and atomic energy.

Loomis was transferred to Camp Lejeune in September 1952, when he was appointed chief of staff to the Commanding general Force Troops, Fleet Marine Force Atlantic (FMFLANT). In this capacity, he was responsible for all independent units under FMFLANT such as support artillery units, antiaircraft artillery units, military police battalions, separate engineer units and other miscellaneous force units. He assumed duties as Commanding General Force Troops, FMFLANT in May 1953 and was promoted to the rank of brigadier general in July of that year. Following a one year of duty in this capacity, he was appointed assistant division commander of the 2nd Marine Division in July 1955.

He was relieved by Brigadier General Randall M. Victory in May 1956 and retired from the Marine Corps. Loomis was advanced to the rank of major general for having been specially commended in combat. Loomis died on December 31, 1989, in Oceanside, California, where he lived with his wife Jane Elizabeth James Loomis (1903–2001). His ashes were scattered at sea.

== Decorations ==
Here is the ribbon bar of Major General Francis B. Loomis Jr.:

1st Row	Legion of Merit with Combat "V"	Bronze Star Medal with Combat "V"		Navy Presidential Unit Citation with one star
2nd Row	Marine Corps Expeditionary Medal with one star	Yangtze Service Medal	China Service Medal	American Defense Service Medal with Fleet Clasp
3rd Row	American Campaign Medal	Asiatic-Pacific Campaign Medal with four 3/16 inch service stars	World War II Victory Medal	National Defense Service Medal

Military offices
Preceded by Gregon A. Williams	Commanding General of the Force Troops, Fleet Marine Force Atlantic; April 1953 - July 1955	Succeeded by Jack P. Juhan
