= Christine S. Calvo =

First lady of Guam

First Lady of Guam
- In role January 3, 2011 – January 7, 2019
- Governor: Eddie Baza Calvo
- Succeeded by: Jeffrey Cook

Personal details
- Born: Guam
- Spouse: Eddie Baza Calvo
- Children: 6
- Occupation: Businesswoman, First Lady of Guam
- Other names: Christine Calvo, Christine Sonido Calvo, Christine Marie Sonido, Christine M.S. Calvo

Christine S. Calvo is a Guamanian businesswoman and former First Lady of Guam from 2011 to 2019.

== Early life ==
Calvo was born in Guam. Calvo graduated from Notre Dame High School in Talo'fo'fo, Guam.

== Career ==
Calvo is the president and owner of Todu Marketing LLC, a graphic and printing business in Guam.

In sports, Calvo is the manager of the Guam Rugby Football Union and Women’s Team. Calvo is the head coach of the Academy of Our Lady of Guam and the St. Francis Catholic School girls’ rugby teams.

On November 2, 2010, when Eddie Baza Calvo won the election as the Governor of Guam, Calvo became the First Lady of Guam. Calvo served as First Lady of Guam on January 3, 2011, until January 7, 2019.

On November 23, 2012, Calvo invited the women of Guam to wear red to the Random Women’s Rally at the Paseo de Susana Loop in Guam.

Calvo is an honorary chairperson of the Guam Memorial Hospital Volunteers Association. In 2015, as First Lady of Guam, Calvo hosted the GMH Volunteers Association's annual membership tea at the government house in Agana Heights.

== Personal life ==
Calvo's husband is Eddie Baza Calvo, a politician and former Governor of Guam. They have six children.
