= Notre Dame High School (Guam) =

High School in Guam

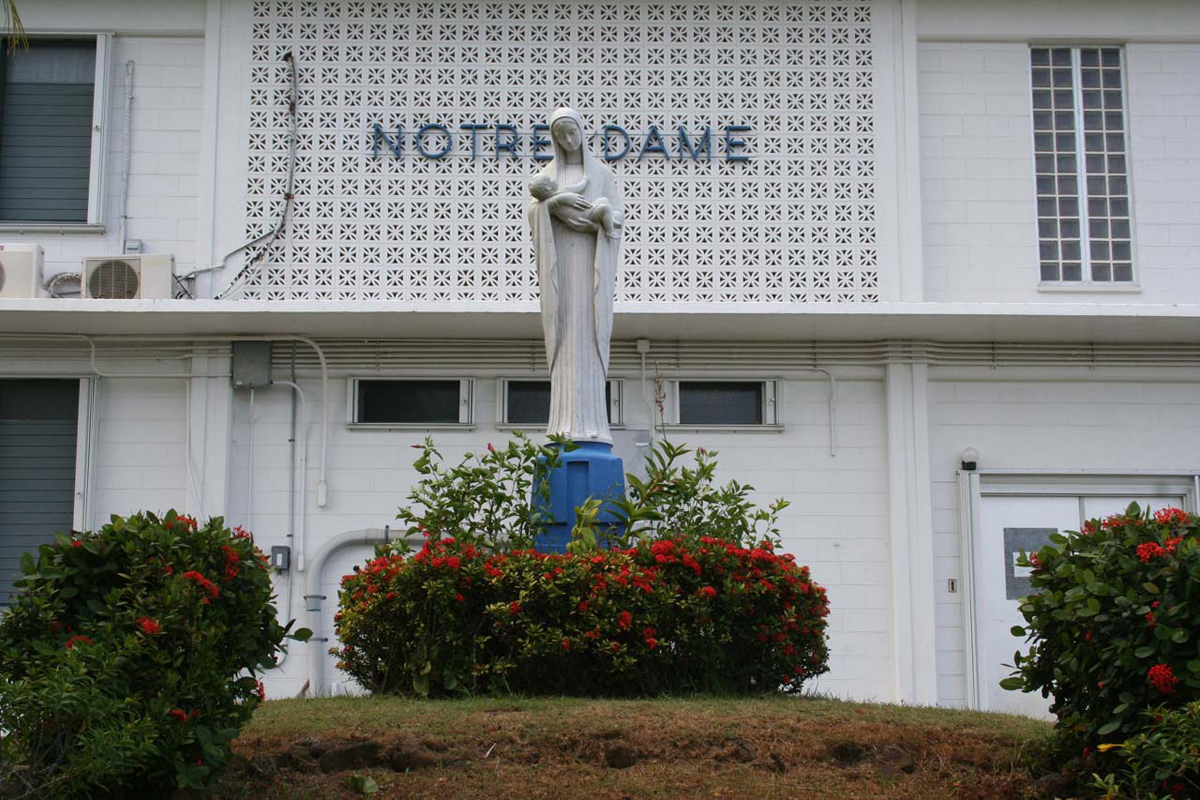

Location
- 480 S. San Miguel Street; Talofofo, Guam 96915; 13°20′41″N 144°45′39″E

Information
- Established: 1968
- President: Jean Ann Crisostomo, SSND
- Principal: Marie Delgado Camacho ND89
- Staff: 15
- Faculty: 20
- Grades: 9-12
- Enrollment: 300
- Student to teacher ratio: 22:1
- Colors: Royal Blue and White
- Athletics conference: Interscholastic Athletic Association of Guam (IIAAG)
- Team name: Royals
- Affiliation: Catholic
- Website: http://www.ndhsguam.com

Notre Dame High School, Inc. (NDHS) is a coeducational Roman Catholic high school located in Talofofo, in the United States territory of Guam.

== Overview ==
The school, owned and operated by the School Sisters of Notre Dame, is in the territory of the Roman Catholic Archdiocese of Agaña. The school is accredited by the Western Association of Schools and Colleges.

== History ==
The school was established in 1968. In 1995 the school began admitting boys, making it Guam's first co-educational Catholic high school.

== Notable people ==
- Joanne M. Brown, Politician.
- Christine S. Calvo - Businesswoman and former First Lady of Guam.

== Gallery ==
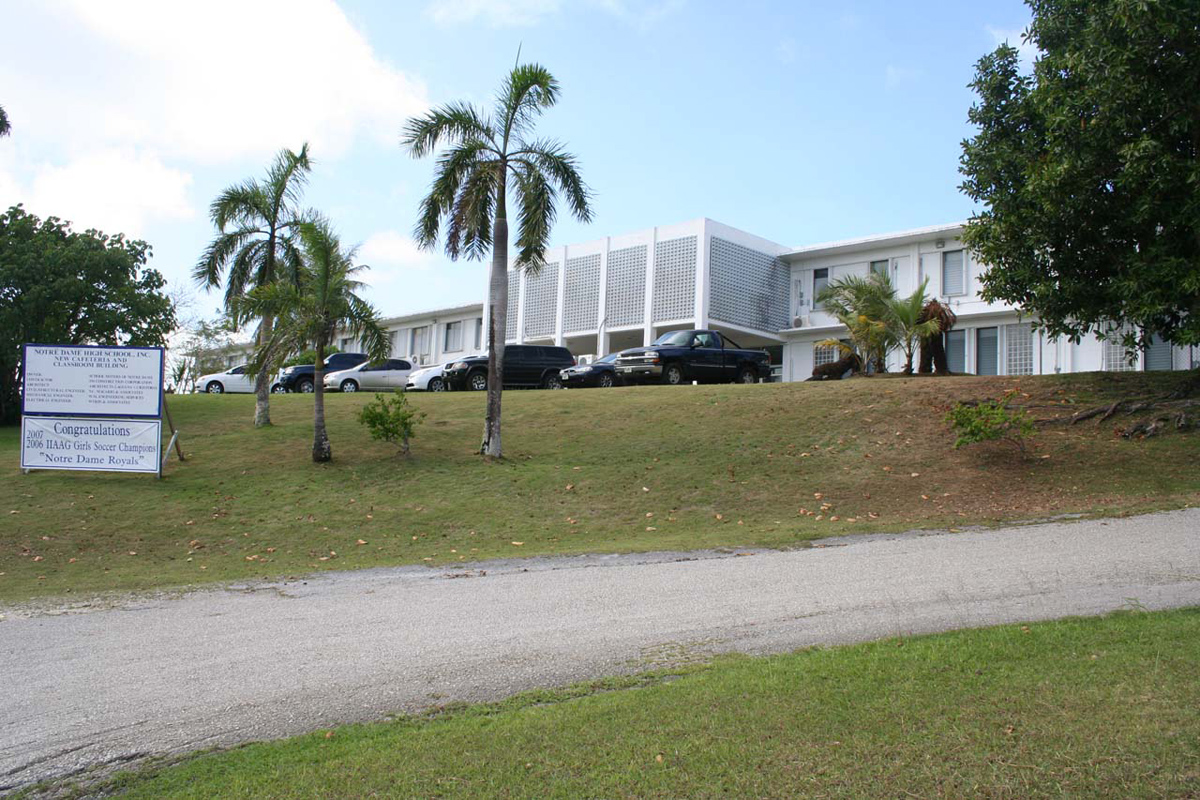
Notre Dame High School
