= Sidney S. Wade =

U.S. Marine Corps Major General

Sidney Scott Wade
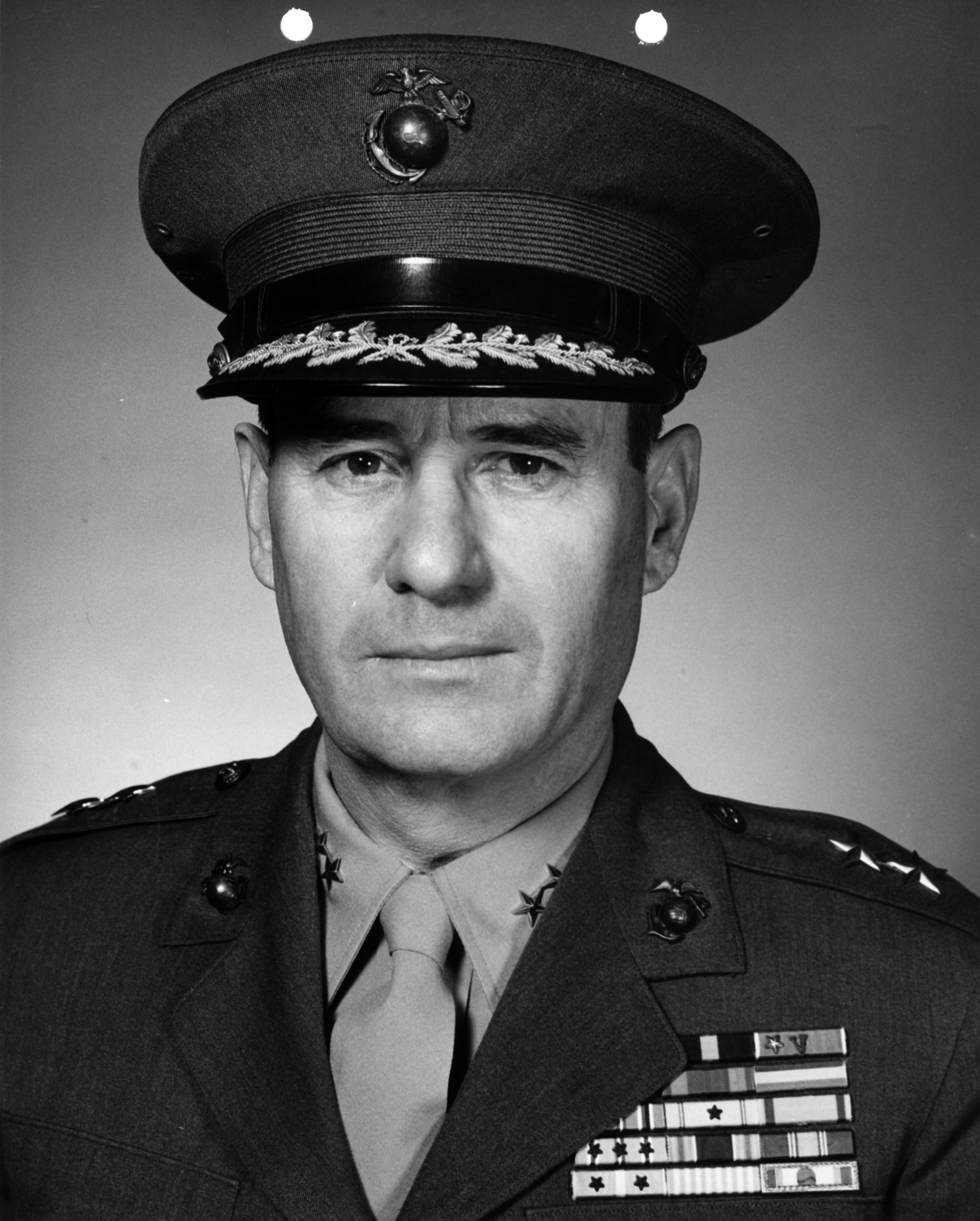
- MG Sidney S. Wade, USMC
- Born: September 30, 1909; Bloomington, Illinois, U.S.
- Died: November 24, 2002 (aged 93); Albuquerque, New Mexico, U.S.
- Military career
- Allegiance: United States of America
- Branch: United States Marine Corps
- Service years: 1928–1967
- Rank: Major general
- Service number: 0-4881
- Commands: Camp Lejeune; MCRD San Diego; Force Troops, FMFLANT; 1st Marine Regiment
- Conflicts: Yangtze Patrol; World War II: Bougainville Campaign; Recapture of Guam; Battle of Okinawa; Korean War; 1958 Lebanon crisis
- Awards: Navy Distinguished Service Medal; Legion of Merit (3); Air Medal

Sidney Scott Wade (September 30, 1909 – November 24, 2002) was a highly decorated officer of the United States Marine Corps who attained the rank of major general. He is most noted as commanding general of all Marine forces during 1958 Lebanon crisis and previously as commanding officer of the 1st Marine Regiment during Korean War. Wade later served as commanding general of the Force Troops, Fleet Marine Force Atlantic and MCRD San Diego.

== Early career ==
Sidney S. Wade was born on September 30, 1909, in Bloomington, Illinois, and attended local high school in 1927. He subsequently enlisted in the United States Marine Corps in May 1928 and after one year of enlisted service, he was appointed to the United States Naval Academy in Annapolis, Maryland, in July 1929. Wade graduated in 1933, and was commissioned second lieutenant in the Marine Corps on the same date. He was then sent to the Basic School at Philadelphia Navy Yard for further officers training.

Following the completing of the course, he was subsequently assigned to the Marine detachment aboard the cruiser USS Pennsylvania and later served aboard the heavy cruiser USS Salt Lake City. Wade was transferred to the 4th Marine Regiment under Colonel John C. Beaumont and sailed for China in 1935. He was stationed in Shanghai and participated in the defense of the Shanghai International Settlement. During his service there, he was promoted to the rank of first lieutenant in 1936.

Wade returned to the United States during 1937 and was assigned to the Marine barracks at Naval Air Station Pensacola, Florida, and following two years of service there, he was promoted to the rank of captain in 1939 and assigned to the Junior Course at Amphibious Warfare School within Marine Corps Schools at Quantico Base.

== World War II ==
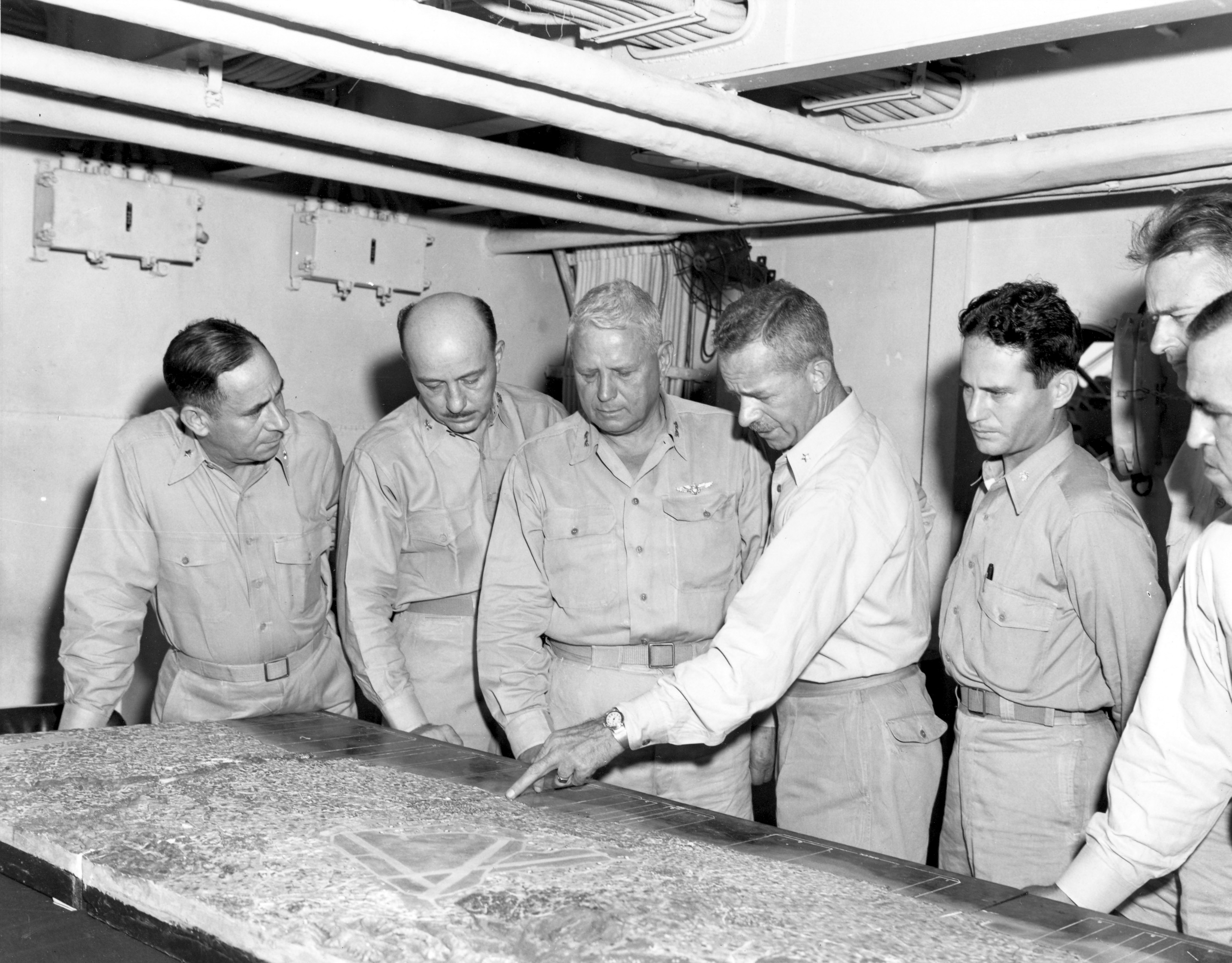
Wade (fifth from left) and III MAC staff during the planning of Okinawa operation. From left to right: David R. Nimmer, Walter A. Wachtler, Roy S. Geiger, Merwin H. Silverthorn, Wade, Francis B. Loomis Jr. and Gale T. Cummings.

Upon his graduation from the Amphibious Warfare School in 1940, Wade was appointed commanding officer of the Marine detachment aboard the cruiser USS Louisville. While aboard this vessel, he participated in the raids at Bismarck Archipelago, New Guinea and Solomon Islands. Wade was promoted to the rank of major in May 1942 and ordered back to the United States for instruction at Army Command and General Staff College at Fort Leavenworth, Kansas. He returned to the South Pacific Area in December 1942 and assigned to the intelligence section on staff of the I Marine Amphibious Corps (IMAC) under Major General Clayton Barney Vogel.

He was promoted to the rank of lieutenant colonel in April 1943, and when IMAC was redesignated III Amphibious Corps under Major General Roy Geiger in April 1944, he participated in the planning and execution of the Bougainville Campaign, Landing on Emirau, Recapture of Guam or Battle of Okinawa. For his service in this capacity, Wade was decorated with the Legion of Merit with Combat "V".

== Later service ==
Wade returned to the United States in October 1945 and was assigned to the Marine Corps Schools at Marine Base Quantico as officer in charge of the intelligence section. He was subsequently transferred to Washington, D.C., in August 1947 and attached to the Joint Logistic Plans Group within Joint Chiefs of Staff. In this capacity, Wade participated in the basic war plans work and also in the staff support for Joint Intelligence Committee, Joint Strategic Plans Committee and Joint Logistics Plans Committee. While served in this assignment, he was promoted to the rank of colonel in August 1949.

Colonel Wade was transferred to Hawaii in August 1950 and assigned as assistant intelligence officer of the Fleet Marine Force Pacific under Lieutenant General Lemuel C. Shepherd. However, Korean War brought him to the command of the 1st Marine Regiment in October 1951, when he relieved Colonel Thomas A. Wornham. Wade subsequently led the regiment during the fighting on the East Central Front and later on Western Front and received his second Legion of Merit with Combat "V".

He remained in Korea until the beginning of April 1952, when he was ordered back to the United States. During his service in Korea, Wade also received Air Medal and Navy Presidential Unit Citation.

Wade subsequently attended National War College in Washington, D.C., and following the graduation in 1953, he remained in Washington, D.C., and was attached to the Headquarters Marine Corps as head of the Plans Branch within Operations and Plans Division there. After two years of service in that capacity, Wade was transferred to Quantico, Virginia, as senior member of the Advanced Research Group. This group of ten colonels for a year to develop recommendations on how to the Marine air-ground task force should evolve structurally to meet the challenges of atomic warfare and new technologies such as helicopters and high-speed aircraft.

Another staff assignment came in June 1956, when he was attached to the Office of the Chief of Naval Operations, as assistant to the director of Long Range objectives group, Rear Admiral Roy L. Johnson. While still serving in this capacity, he was promoted to the rank of brigadier general in May 1957.

He subsequently relieved Brigadier General Jack P. Juhan in July 1957 as commanding general of the Force Troops, Fleet Marine Force Atlantic based at Camp Lejeune. In this capacity, he was responsible for all independent units under FMFLANT such as support artillery units, antiaircraft artillery units, military police battalions, separate engineer units and other miscellaneous force units of the Fleet Marine Force, Atlantic.

However following the Lebanese political crisis caused by political and religious tensions in the country in July 1958, President Camille Chamoun had requested the military assistance, which President Dwight D. Eisenhower approved and responded by authorizing Operation Blue Bat on July 15, 1958. The United States subsequently sent approximately 14,000 men, including 5,670 officers and men of the United States Marine Corps, which were formed to the 2nd Provisional Marine Force. General Wade was subsequently appointed commanding general of that Force and sailed to Lebanon, where he went ashore in Beirut and remained in command of all marine forces throughout the crisis. For his meritorious service during the crisis, Wade was decorated with Navy Distinguished Service Medal. He also received the Stephen Decatur Award for Operational Excellence from the Navy League of the United States.

General Wade returned to Camp Lejeune at the beginning of October 1958 and relieved Brigadier General Randall M. Victory as assistant division commander of the 2nd Marine Division stationed there. He relieved Major General James P. Riseley as commanding general of the Marine Corps Base Camp Lejeune in July 1959 and remained in this capacity until October 1960. Meanwhile, he was promoted to the rank of major general in July 1960.

He was transferred to the Headquarters Marine Corps in Washington, D.C., as assistant chief of staff (G-3), the staff officer in charge of plans and operations. This duty was terminated in September 1961, when he was transferred to the Pentagon as Marine Corps liaison officer in the Office of the Vice Chief of Naval Operations, Admiral Claude V. Ricketts. He was succeeded by Brigadier General Henry W. Buse.

On 15 February 1962, Major General Wade was transferred to San Diego, California, and assumed command of Marine Corps Recruit Depot San Diego. He was subsequently transferred to Hawaii in November 1963 and appointed deputy commander to the commanding general Fleet Marine Force Pacific, Lieutenant General Carson A. Roberts. In this capacity he was co-responsible for 200,000 men under his command. Wade subsequently moved to Okinawa, Japan in June 1965 and was appointed Deputy Commander III Marine Amphibious Corps (Forward). In this capacity he participated in the support activities of the Marine Forces in Vietnam. Wade later received his third Legion of Merit.

Wade returned to the United States in April 1966 and served briefly as deputy commander of Fleet Marine Force Atlantic under Lieutenant General Alpha L. Bowser, before he was appointed deputy chief of staff of commander in chief Atlantic Fleet, Admiral Thomas H. Moorer. He served in this capacity until his retirement from the Marine Corps on November 3, 1967.

He subsequently settled in Albuquerque, New Mexico, together with his wife, Doris Edwards and died on November 24, 2002. They had a son, Sidney Scott Wade, Jr., and a daughter, Annetta Wade Williams. In accordance with the wish of General Wade, there was no memorial service.

== Decorations ==
Here is the ribbon bar of Major General Sidney S. Wade:

1st Row	Navy Distinguished Service Medal			
2nd Row	Legion of Merit with Combat "V" and two 5/16" Gold Stars	Air Medal	Navy Presidential Unit Citation	China Service Medal
3rd Row	American Defense Service Medal with Fleet Clasp	American Campaign Medal	Asiatic-Pacific Campaign Medal with three 3/16 inch service stars	World War II Victory Medal
4th Row	National Defense Service Medal with one star	Korean Service Medal with two 3/16 inch service stars	United Nations Korea Medal	Republic of Korea Presidential Unit Citation

Military offices
Preceded by Victor H. Krulak	Commanding General of Marine Corps Recruit Depot San Diego; 15 February 1962 – November 1963	Succeeded by Bruno Hochmuth
Preceded by Jack P. Juhan	Commanding General of the Force Troops, Fleet Marine Force Atlantic; 5 July 1957 – 15 July 1958	Succeeded by Leonard F. Chapman Jr.
Preceded by Thomas A. Wornham	Commanding Officer of the 1st Marine Regiment; 12 October 1951 – 7 April 1952	Succeeded by Walter N. Flournoy
