= Francis Butler Loomis =

American journalist and diplomat (1861–1948)

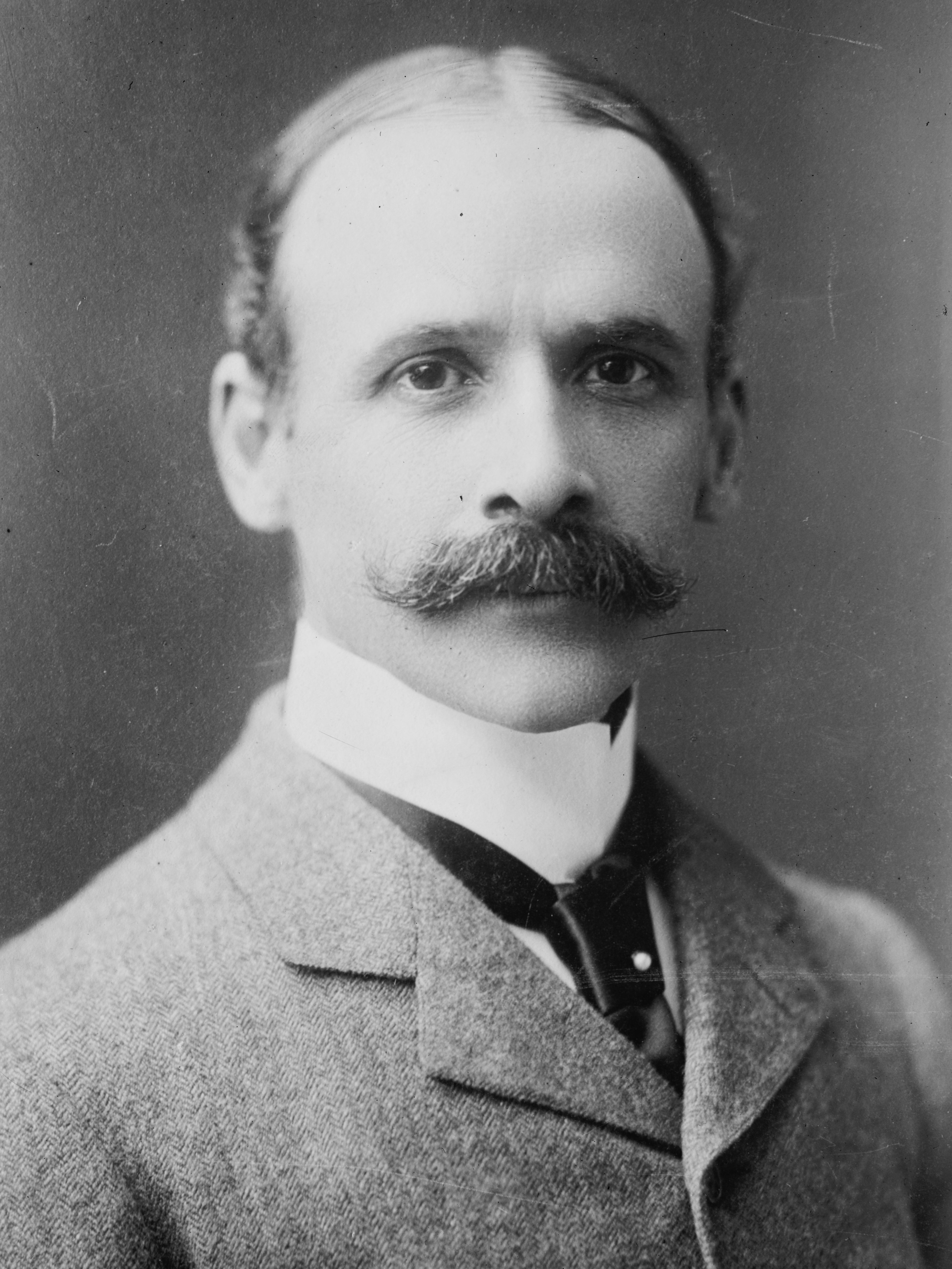

25th United States Assistant Secretary of State
- In office January 7, 1903 – October 10, 1905
- President: Theodore Roosevelt
- Preceded by: David Jayne Hill
- Succeeded by: Robert Bacon

Personal details
- Born: July 27, 1861 Marietta, Ohio, U.S.
- Died: August 4, 1948 (aged 87) San Francisco, California, U.S.
- Party: Republican
- Education: Marietta College
- Profession: Journalist, Editor, Politician

Francis Butler Loomis (July 27, 1861 – August 4, 1948) served as the United States Ambassador to Venezuela from 1897 to 1901 and the United States Ambassador to Portugal from 1901 to 1902. He was the United States Assistant Secretary of State from 1903 to 1905 when he was appointed as the acting United States Secretary of State. His son was Major general Francis B. Loomis Jr.

== Biography ==
Francis Butler Loomer was born on July 27, 1861 in Marietta, Ohio.

He began his career as a newspaperman in his hometown, editing the Marietta Leader while a student at Marietta College. A year following his graduation in 1883, Loomis became a reporter for the New York Tribune and later assumed a campaign press relations position. He returned to Ohio to serve as state librarian for two years (from 1885 to 1887).

It was during the administration of President Benjamin Harrison that Loomis first entered government service as consul at Saint-Étienne, and at Grenoble, France, until 1893. For the next three years from 1893 to 1896, Loomis returned briefly to journalism as editor of the Cincinnati Daily Tribune. President William McKinley appointed him Ambassador to Venezuela in 1897. Prior to entering the Orinoco delta, the USS Wilmington called at Port of Spain, the capital of the British colony of Trinidad. She was boarded there by Loomis as the U.S. minister to Venezuela. In Trinidad, Loomis had been engaged in diplomatic fence mending. With the Venezuelan crisis only recent history and with U.S.-sponsored mediation of the Esequibo border dispute still under way, Loomis carried on board the Wilmington a letter from the British Governor of Trinidad to the President of Venezuela. The letter proposed a meeting between the two leaders with the purpose of renewing normal relations severed since 1887.

Loomis typified the marriage of U.S. foreign policy and commercial expansion at the end of the 19th century. His presence on board the Wilmington underscored the role played by U.S. gunboats as vehicles of such expansion. As a Republican from Ohio who served in the presidential campaigns of Benjamin Harrison and William McKinley, and through his associations as a journalist in New York, Philadelphia, Washington, and Cincinnati, Loomis had close ties to U.S. commercial interests. He also had strong links to the National Association of Manufacturers of the United States, the largest and most important commercial body organized to promote foreign trade. While minister to Venezuela, he earned a solid reputation as an advocate of U.S. commercial expansion when in 1898 he established a warehouse in the Venezuelan capital of Caracas exhibiting samples of U.S. manufactures and goods. In 1901 Loomis was appointed as ambassador to Portugal.

A year later, he was recalled to Washington, DC, and was appointed Assistant Secretary of State. On the death of Secretary John Hay, he served as acting Secretary of State briefly in 1905. During his State Department tenure, he became associated with the reorganization of the American Red Cross, serving as a charter member. His commissions included final negotiations which resulted in the acquisition of the Panama Canal Zone, service as special ambassador to France to receive the body of John Paul Jones and Special Envoy Extraordinary to Japan, arranging the visit of the U.S. fleet to that country in 1908. Shortly before World War I Loomis returned to private business as foreign trade adviser to the Standard Oil Company serving until retirement.

He died on August 4, 1948, in the San Francisco Bay area in California.

Political offices
Preceded by David Jayne Hill	United States Assistant Secretary of State; January 7, 1903 – October 10, 1905	Succeeded by Robert Bacon
Diplomatic posts
Preceded by Allen Thomas	United States Minister to Venezuela; July 8, 1897 – April 8, 1901	Succeeded by Herbert W. Bowen
Preceded by John N. Irwin	United States Minister to Portugal; June 17, 1901 – September 16, 1902	Succeeded by Charles Page Bryan
