= Geri T. Gutierrez =

Guamanian businesswoman and First Lady of Guam

First Lady of Guam
- In role January 2, 1995 – January 6, 2003
- Governor: Felix Perez Camacho

Personal details
- Born: Guam
- Political party: Democratic
- Spouse: Carl Gutierrez
- Children: 3
- Relatives: Jose Martinez Torres (grandfather)
- Occupation: Businesswoman, First Lady of Guam
- Other names: Geri Gutierrez, Geraldine Gutierrez, Geraldine T. Gutierrez, Geraldine Chance Torres,

Geraldine "Geri" Chance Torres Gutierrez is a Guamanian businesswoman, politician and former First Lady of Guam from 1995 until 2003.

== Early life ==
Gutierrez was born in Guam.

== Career ==
In 1971, Gutierrez started Carltom Enterprises, a construction business, with her husband and her brother-in-law.

In November 1994, when her husband Carl Gutierrez won election to be the Governor of Guam, Gutierrez became the First Lady of Guam. She served as First Lady of Guam from January 2, 1995, until January 6, 2003.

Gutierrez is a member of Guam's family violence task force. In October 1997, while Guam celebrated Family Violence Awareness Month, at the national level, Gutierrez represented Guam in Washington, D.C.

In 2000, a group of supporters of Governor Carl T.C. Gutierrez wanted Gutierrez to run to be the next Governor of Guam.

== Personal life ==
Gutierrez' husband is Carl Gutierrez. They have three children, Carla, Tommy, and Hannah. Gutierrez' godchildren are Jim Flores and Joleen Respicio.

Her grandfather was Jose Martinez Torres, and she is an administrator of his estate.
