= Omnibus Territories Act of 2013 =

- Long title: To improve the administration of programs in the insular areas, and for other purposes.
- Announced in: the 113th United States Congress
- Sponsored by: Sen. Ron Wyden (D, OR)
- Number of co-sponsors: 1

Codification
- Acts affected: Guam Meritorious Claims Act of 1945, REAL ID Act of 2005, Immigration and Nationality Act, Fair Minimum Wage Act of 2007, Low-Income Home Energy Assistance Act of 1981, and others.
- U.S.C. sections affected: 29 U.S.C. § 206, 46 U.S.C. § 12113, 49 U.S.C. § 30301, 48 U.S.C. § 1469a, 21 U.S.C. § 1703, and others.
- Agencies affected: Office of National Drug Control Policy, United States Department of Justice, Government Accountability Office, United States Army Corps of Engineers, United States Department of Labor, United States Congress, United States Department of Transportation, United States Department of the Navy, United States Department of the Treasury, United States Department of the Interior, Department of Homeland Security, United States Department of the Army

Legislative history
- Introduced in the Senate as S. 1237 by Sen. Ron Wyden (D, OR) on June 27, 2013; Committee consideration by United States Senate Committee on Energy and Natural Resources; Passed the Senate on June 18, 2014 (unanimous consent)

The Omnibus Territories Act of 2013 (S. 1237) is a bill that amend laws concerning the territories of American Samoa, Guam, the U.S. Virgin Islands, and the Commonwealth of the Northern Mariana Islands (collectively known as insular areas). The bill would increase the size of the territory of the Northern Mariana Islands, start an energy plan for the areas, and expand turtle conservation efforts.

The bill was introduced into and passed by the United States Senate during the 113th United States Congress.

== Provisions of the bill ==
This summary is based largely on the summary provided by the Congressional Research Service, a public domain source.

The Omnibus Territories Act of 2013 would convey to the government of the Commonwealth of the Northern Mariana Islands (CNMI) submerged lands surrounding such Islands and extending three geographical miles outward from their coastlines. The bill would include the CNMI among the islands where the President may establish naval defensive sea areas and airspace reservations when necessary for national defense.

The bill would amend the Fair Minimum Wage Act of 2007 to add 2013 and 2015 as years in which there shall be no increase in the minimum wage applicable to the CNMI.

The bill would revise the treatment of supplemental fees imposed for employment of nonimmigrant workers paid into the Treasury of the CNMI government for the purpose of funding ongoing vocational educational curricula and program development by CNMI educational entities to: (1) require such government to provide to the Secretary of Homeland Security (DHS) a plan for the expenditure of funds, a projection of the effectiveness of the expenditures in job placement of U.S. workers, and a report on changes in employment of U.S. workers attributable to prior year expenditures; and (2) require a biennial report by the Secretary on the effectiveness of meeting the goals set out in the CNMI's annual plan for the expenditure of funds.

The bill would revise the procedure for classification of aliens in the CNMI as long-term investors.

The bill would extend through December 31, 2019, a system for allocating and determining the number, terms, and conditions of permits issued to prospective employers for nonimmigrant workers performing work during the transition period (the period for administration of a transition program to regulate immigration to the CNMI) who would not otherwise be eligible for admission under the Immigration and Nationality Act.

The bill would require the Secretary of the Interior to establish a team of technical, policy, and financial experts to: (1) develop an energy action plan addressing the energy needs of each of the insular areas (American Samoa, the CNMI, Puerto Rico, Guam, and the Virgin Islands) and Freely Associated States (the Federated States of Micronesia, the Republic of the Marshall Islands, and the Republic of Palau); and (2) assist each of the insular areas and Freely Associated States in implementing such plan.

The bill would require such plan to include: (1) recommendations to reduce reliance and expenditures on imported fossil fuels, to develop indigenous, nonfossil fuel energy sources, and to improve performance of energy infrastructure and overall energy efficiency; (2) a schedule for implementation of such recommendations and identification and prioritization of specific projects; (3) a financial and engineering plan for implementing and sustaining projects; and (4) benchmarks for measuring progress toward implementation.

The bill would require the Board of Elections of the Virgin Islands, as part of the next regularly scheduled, islands-wide election, to hold a referendum to seek the approval of the people of the Virgin Islands regarding whether the position of Chief Financial Officer of the Government of the Virgin Islands shall be established as a part of the executive branch of such government. The bill would require the governor of the Virgin Islands to appoint a Chief Financial Officer (CFO), with the advice and consent of the Legislature of the Virgin Islands, from a list required by this Act. Provides a process for appointment of an Acting CFO.

The bill would set forth the CFO's duties.

The bill would establish the Virgin Islands Chief Financial Officer Search Commission to recommend at least three candidates for the CFO position. Terminates the Commission upon the nomination and confirmation of the CFO.

The bill would require the Comptroller General (GAO) to report to Congress an evaluation of whether the annual estimates or forecasts of revenue and expenditure of American Samoa, the CNMI, Puerto Rico, Guam, and the Virgin Islands are reasonable and make recommendations for improving the process for developing estimates or forecasts.

The bill would make households located in the Virgin Islands with household income up to 300% of the poverty level eligible for assistance under the low-income home energy assistance program.

The bill would establish the Castle Nugent National Historic Site on the island of St. Croix, U.S. Virgin Islands, as a unit of the National Park System in order to preserve, protect, and interpret a Caribbean cultural landscape spanning over 300 years of agricultural use, significant archaeological resources, an extensive barrier coral reef system, and other outstanding natural features. The bill would authorize the Secretary of the Interior to lease certain lands within the boundary of the Historic Site to the University of the Virgin Islands for the purpose of continuing the university's operations for breeding Senepol cattle.

The bill would establish the St. Croix National Heritage Area in St. Croix, U.S. Virgin Islands.

The bill would designate St. Croix United for Community, Culture, Environment, and Economic Development (SUCCEED) Inc., as the local coordinating entity for the Area.

The bill would require SUCCEED Inc. to submit a management plan that provides for the protection, enhancement, and interpretation of the natural, cultural, historic, scenic, and recreational resources of the Area.

The bill would recognize the suffering and the loyalty of the residents of Guam during the Japanese occupation of Guam in World War II.

The bill would direct the Secretary of the Treasury to establish a Fund for the payment of claims submitted by compensable Guam victims and survivors of compensable Guam decedents.

The bill would direct the Secretary to make specified payments to: (1) living Guam residents who were raped, injured, interned, or subjected to forced labor or marches, or internment resulting from, or incident to, such occupation and subsequent liberation; and (2) survivors of compensable residents who died in war (such payments to be made after payments have been made to surviving Guam residents).

The bill would direct the Foreign Claims Settlement Commission to specify injuries that would constitute a severe personal injury or a personal injury and adjudicate claims and determine payment eligibility.

The bill would require claims to be filed within one year after the Commission publishes notice of the filing period in the Federal Register and in the Guam media.

The bill would allow local matching required of an affected jurisdiction (i.e., American Samoa, Guam, the CNMI, or the state of Hawaii) for federal programs to be paid in cash or in-kind services provided by the jurisdiction pursuant to the Compact of Free Association Amendments Act of 2003 (concerning the Federated States of Micronesia and the Republic of the Marshall Islands) and the Palau Compact of Free Association Act. Excepts programs of competitive grants.

The bill would amend the Housing and Community Development Act of 1980, with respect to housing assistance for the benefit of an alien lawfully resident in the United States, to provide that within Guam a citizen or national of the United States shall be entitled to a preference or priority in receiving financial assistance before any such alien who is otherwise eligible for such assistance.

The bill would require the Comptroller General to study the use of benefit-to-cost ratio formulas by departments and agencies for purposes of evaluating projects in American Samoa, assessing in particular its remote locations, transportation costs, airport traffic control towers, and water resources development projects.

The bill would require departments and agencies, in the case of grants to American Samoa, Guam, the Virgin Islands, and the CNMI, to waive any requirement for local matching funds (including in-kind contributions) that the area would otherwise be required to provide, including waiver of an entire matching requirement for a grant requiring matching funds of $500,000 or less.

The bill would exempt vessels from the fishery endorsement requirement that they be rebuilt in the United States if they off load in American Samoa and were rebuilt outside of the United States before January 1, 2011.

The bill would amend the Fair Minimum Wage Act of 2007 to require GAO to include in reports assessing the impact of minimum wage increases applicable to American Samoa and the CNMI an analysis of the economic effects on employees and employers of the differentials in minimum wage rates among industries and classifications in American Samoa, including the potential effects of eliminating such differentials prior to the time when such rates are scheduled to equal the minimum wage set forth in the Fair Labor Standards Act.

The American Samoa Citizenship Plebiscite Act would require the Secretary of the Interior to direct the American Samoa Election Office to conduct a plebiscite on the issue of whether persons born in American Samoa desire U.S. citizenship.

The bill would expand marine turtle conservation assistance under the Marine Turtle Conservation Act of 2004 to include the United States and its territories.

== Congressional Budget Office report ==
This summary is based largely on the summary provided by the Congressional Budget Office, as ordered reported by the Senate Committee on Energy and Natural Resources on December 19, 2013. This is a public domain source.

S. 1237 would amend laws concerning the territories of American Samoa, Guam, the U.S. Virgin Islands, and the Commonwealth of the Northern Mariana Islands (collectively known as insular areas). The legislation would authorize federal agencies to waive the requirement to provide local matching funds to receive certain federal grants in the insular areas; the amount of the waiver could not exceed $500,000. The legislation also would create a fund that would pay compensation to people and their family members who were victims of the Japanese occupation of Guam during World War II. Finally, S. 1237 would require reports to the Congress by the United States Department of the Interior, the Government Accountability Office, and the Office of National Drug Control Policy concerning issues faced by the insular areas.

The Congressional Budget Office (CBO) estimates that enacting S. 1237 would increase net direct spending by about $20 million over the 2015-2024 period. Because the bill would affect direct spending, pay-as-you-go procedures apply. Enacting the bill would not affect revenues.

Implementing the bill would increase spending subject to appropriation by about $1 million over the 2015-2019 period, assuming availability of appropriated funds.

S. 1237 would impose no intergovernmental or private-sector mandates as defined in the Unfunded Mandates Reform Act.

== Procedural history ==
The Omnibus Territories Act of 2013 was introduced into the United States Senate on June 27, 2014, by Sen. Ron Wyden (D, OR). It was referred to the United States Senate Committee on Energy and Natural Resources. On June 18, 2014, the bill was passed with an amendment by the Senate by unanimous consent.

== Debate and discussion ==
After the bill had been passed by the Senate Committee on Energy and Natural Resources, it was amended on the Senate floor. The amendment removed the provisions of the bill that provided war claims to people for the World War II Japanese occupation of Guam and the provision that allowed the requirement than some federal grants be matched with local funds in order to be awarded. Guam's representative in Congress, Madeleine Bordallo, was "extremely disappointed" by this change and said that she was "committed to continuing our fight for war claims for our manamko despite all the obstacles the conservative Republicans continue to raise." The changes were made so that the bill could pass by unanimous consent.

In testimony about the bill, the Department of the Interior said that "despite the fact that the Department cannot support each and every provision, the bill gives and airing to important territorial issues of long standing."

== See also ==
- List of bills in the 113th United States Congress
