= George Ryan (Irish-Danish businessman) =

Danish merchant, banker, ship owner and colonial planter

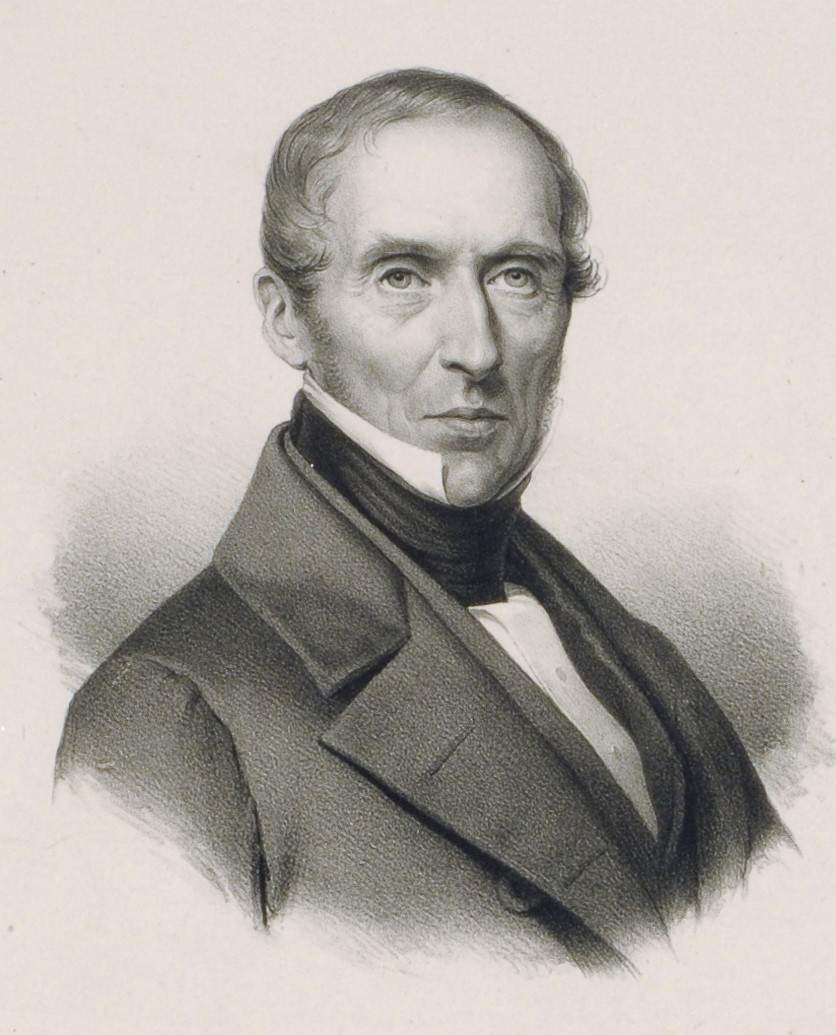
- Born: c. 1783; Saint Croix, Danish West Indies
- Died: 6 December 1861; Copenhagen, Denmark
- Occupations: Merchant and ship-owner

George Ryan (c. 1783 – 6 December 1861) was an Irish-born Danish merchant, banker, ship owner and slave planter. He continued running a trading house and shipping firm founded by his brother Phillip. He owned the property at Sankt Annæ Plads 7 in Copenhagen and the sugar plantation Mary's Fancy on Saint Croix in the Danish West Indies.

== Early life and background ==
Ryan was born c. 1783 or 1785 at Ballinakill in Kilcock, Kildare, Ireland, as the son of squire Edward Ryan (c. 1735–1790) and Catherine (Kitty) née O’Reilly (–1828). His maternal grandfather was Philip O'Reilly, Esq., of Coolamber and Ballymorris, County Longford.

=== Philip Ryan (1766–1809) ===
Ryan had ten brothers and two sisters. One of the brothers, Phillip Ryan (1766–1809), moved to Copenhagen in 1780 to work for Duntzfelt, Meyer & Co. In 1784, he is mentioned as supercargo (cargodør) on the ship Helsingør. Back in Copenhagen, in 1795, Ryan passed the captain's exam. Two years later, he captained the frigate Christianshavn on several expeditions to the Danish West Indies. After being licensed as a merchant (grosserer) he started his own trading firm and operated his own fleet of merchant ships. His ships included Elisabeth, which he sold to Duntzfelt in 1802.

Philip Ryan was married to Bolette Fix (1780–1809), daughter of governor of Serampore Johan Leonhard Fix (1736–1807). After her death, he married Eliza Ferrall. After his death, she went on to marry merchant and captain John Christmas in 1820.

He bought the Barchmann Mansion in 1800, but sold it again later that year to John Christmas. From 1801 to 1804, he owned the Stanley House in Christianshavn, which had previously belonged to Christmas for five years during the 1790s. He sold the property to cartwright Henry Fife.

== Career ==
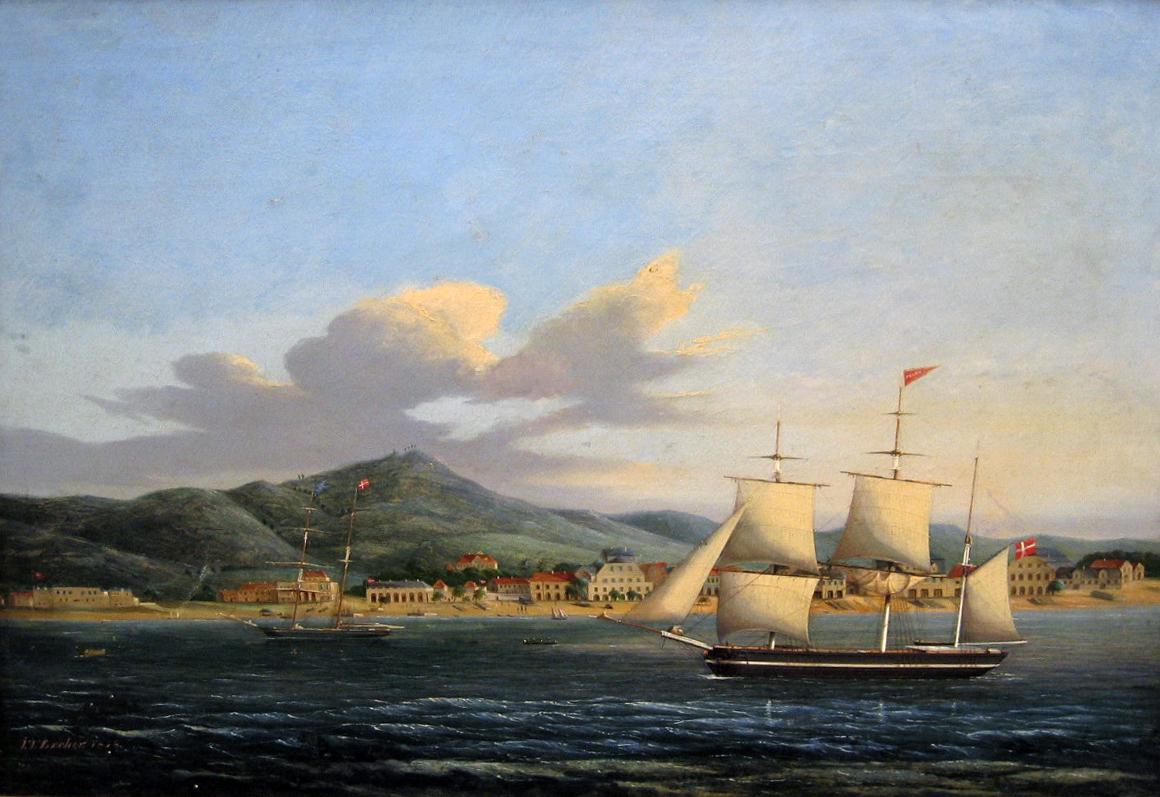
Ryan's ship Mary at Frederiksstad on St. Croix, 1848.

At the age of 14 or 15, Ryan moved to Copenhagen to work in his brother's firm. On his brother's death, be became the owner of the firm.

At the end of the Napoleonic Wars in 1814–1815, Ryan was one of the first general traders in Copenhagen to revive the transatlantic trade with sugar from the Danish West Indies. He owned a fleet of four merchant ships.

Ryan was elected as a member of the board of representatives of the Bank of Denmark for two four-year terms. In 1857, he was a co-founder of Privatbanken of whose board he also was a member.

== Property ==
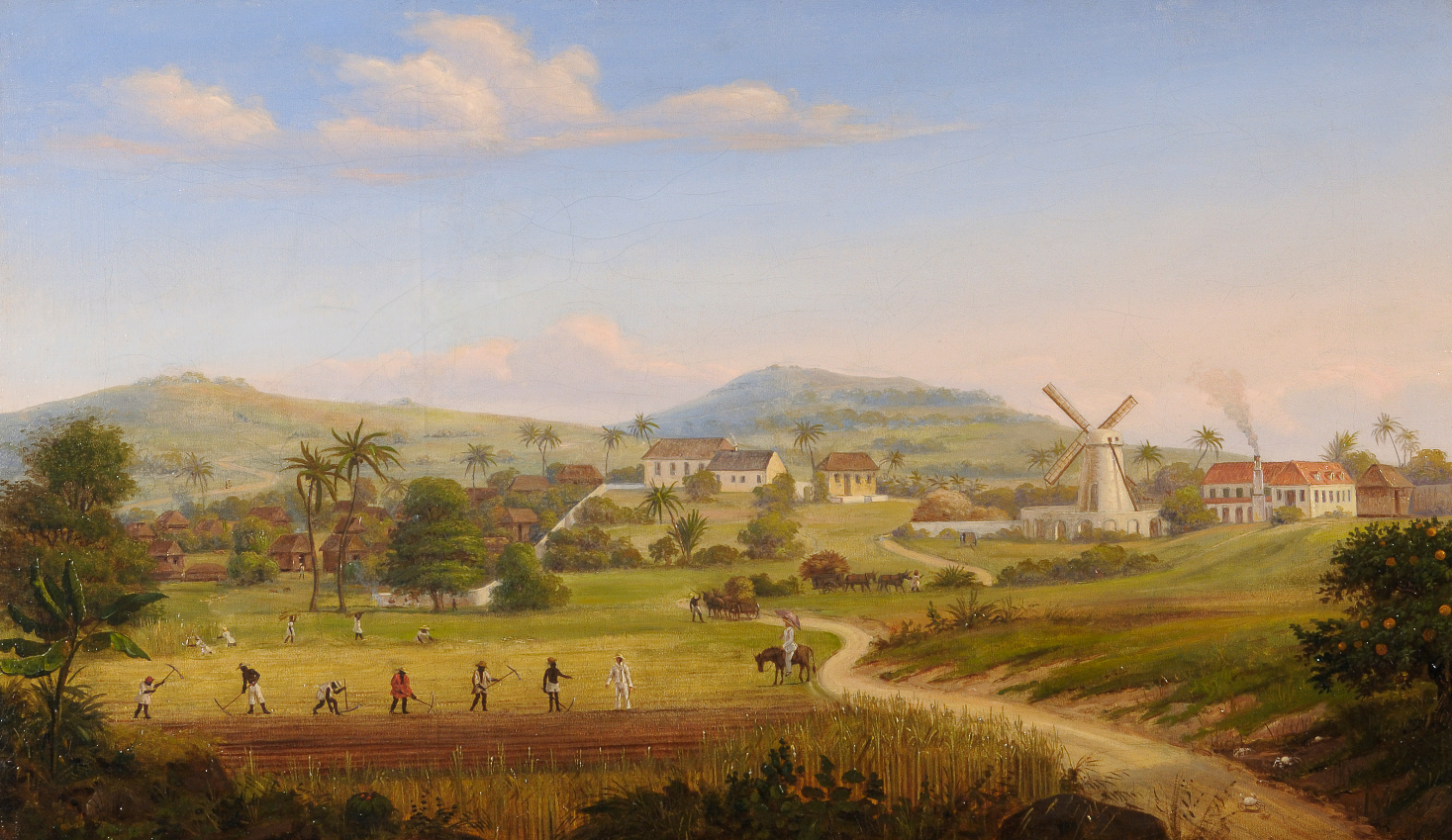
Enslaved Africans working on the Mary's Fancy plantation, owned by George Ryan ( Slavery will be abolished by Danemark in 1848).

Before 1834, Ryan was the owner of the property at Sankt Annæ Plads 7 in Copenhagen.

On 22 December 1838, partly as an endowment (by will of A. Ducouder) and partly as payment on a loan, Ryan became the owner of the sugar plantation Mary's Fancy on Saint Croix. In 1847, the plantation had 105 enslaved people.

On 25 June 1859, with the assistance of James Finlay as attorney to Ryan, it was sold to Thomas Dardis for $40,000 (the half transferred to Geo. Elliott).

== Personal life ==
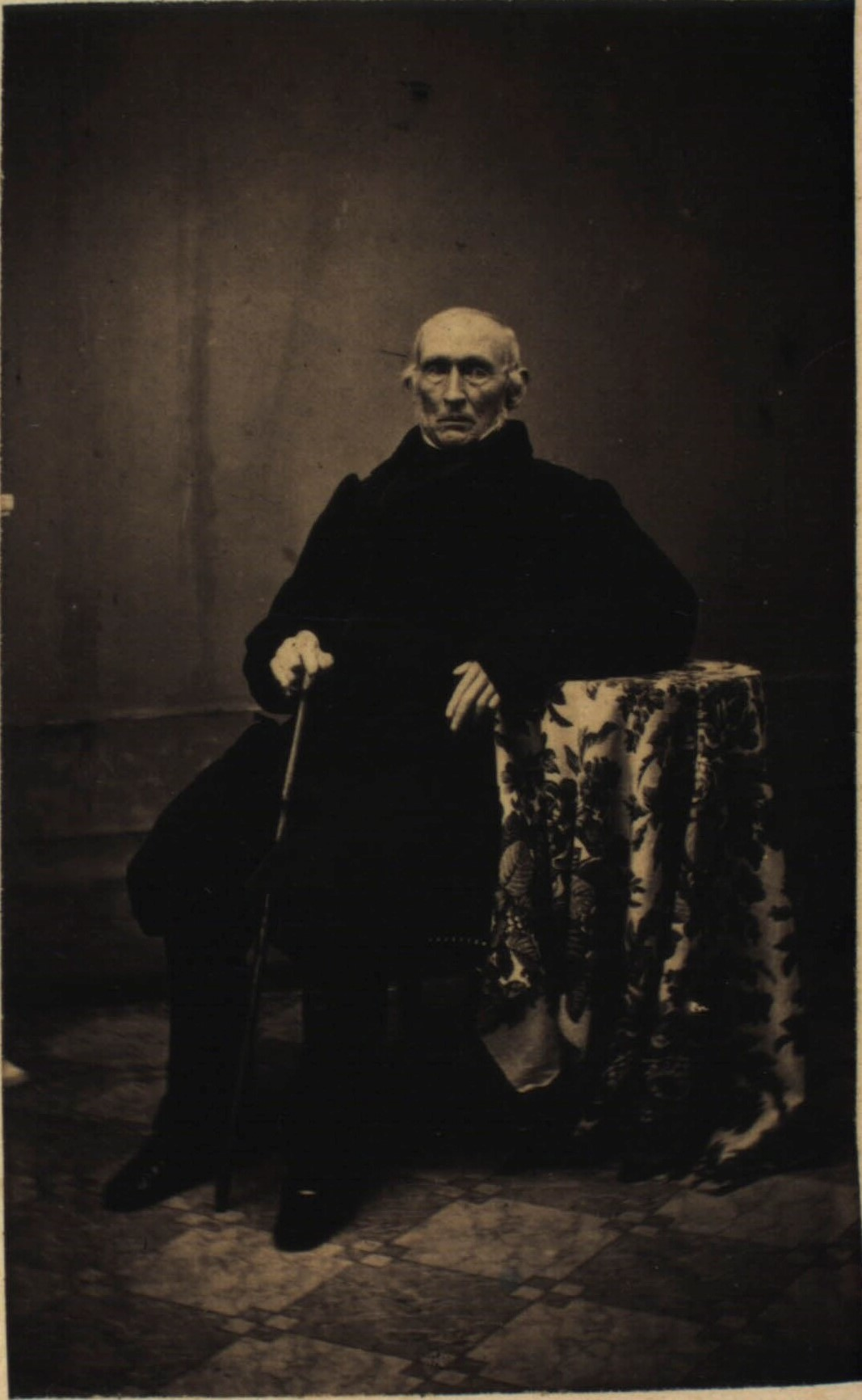
George Ryan

Ryan never married. In 1815, he had a son out of wedlock with Sophie Cecilie Puckendahl (1788–). The boy was born on 8 March 1815 at Fødselsstiftelsen, an institution where it was possible for unmarried women to give birth anonymously. Baptized the same day, he was given the name Carl Frederik. On 7 December the same year he was placed in foster care with a smallholder's wife in Tokkerup. Over the next years, Ryan showed a "fatherly interest" in the boy's upbringing and education. In 1832, Ryan was granted royal permission to adopt the boy, whose name was at the same time changed to Charles Frederik Ryan. In their own time, it was well-known that Ryan was his real father.

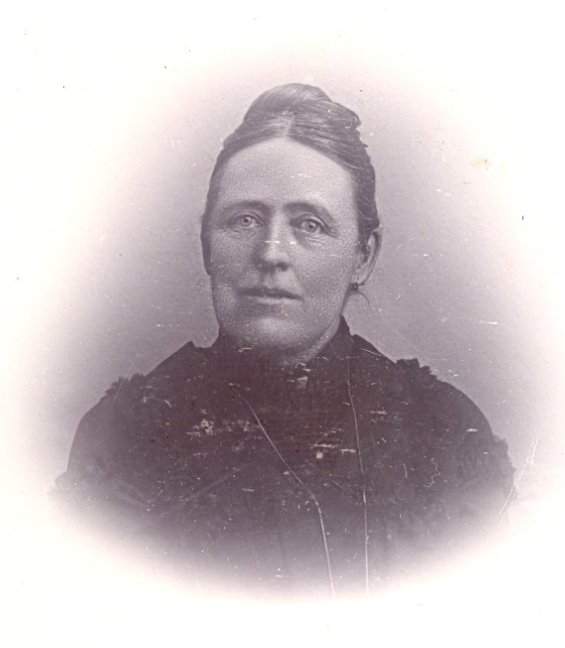
Catharina Treschow

On 20 September 1836, still unmarried, Charles Frederik Ryan had a son out of wedlock with Dorothea Rønnov. Born at Fødselsstiftelsen, he was given the name Edouard Charles. The spelling of the first name was later changed to Edward. Charles Frederik Ryan was later married to Johanna Henrika Witthusen (1820–1899) with whom he had daughters Catharina (Kate) Ryan (1849–1914) and Georgina Ryan (c. 1851–). Charles Frederik Ryan died just 44 years old in 1859.

Ryan died on 6 December 1861. In his will of 22 December 1859, Ryan left an inheritance of 100,000 Danish rigsdaler to Edward Chaarles Rønnov as well as the annual interests of another 100,000 rigsdaler administrated by Overformynderiet. Katharina (Kate) Ryan was married to Christian Rosenkilde Treschow (1842–1905), a chamberlain and owner of Frydendal Manor at Holbæk.

== See also ==
- Ryan, U.S. Virgin Islands
- Thomas Ryan (Quebec politician)
