= Sankt Annæ Plads 9 =

Listed building in Copenhagen

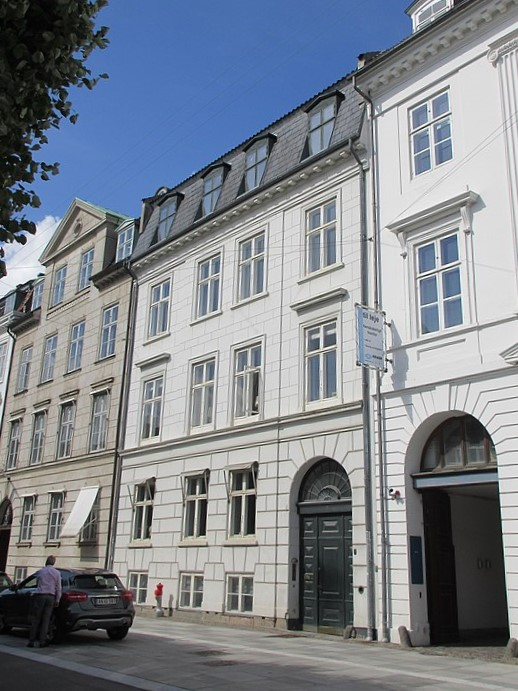
- Interactive map of the Sankt Annæ Plads 9 area

General information
- Location: Copenhagen, Denmark52.39
- Coordinates: 55°40′55.7″N 12°35′24.5″E
- Completed: 1750
- Renovated: 1840

Design and construction
- Architect: Nicolai Eigtved. Thomas Blom (renovation)

Sankt Annæ Plads 9 is a mid 18th-century property situated on the north side of Sankt Annæ Plads, opposite the Garrison Church, in the periphery of the Frederiksstaden district of central Copenhagen, Denmark. Constructed in 1750 according to designs by Nicolai Eigtved, then with apartments for members of the upper middle-class, it was from around 1810 until 1839 used as the last home of Garnisons Workhouse and Girls' School. In 1840, it was again adapted for use as a high-end apartment building by Thomas Blom. The building was listed in the Danish registry of protected buildings and places in 1932. Notable former residents include the composer Johan Christian Gebauer, lawyer and politician Christian Albrecht Bluhme, professor of medicine C.E. Fenger and the former politician and swindler Peter Adler Alberti.

== History ==
=== Construction ===
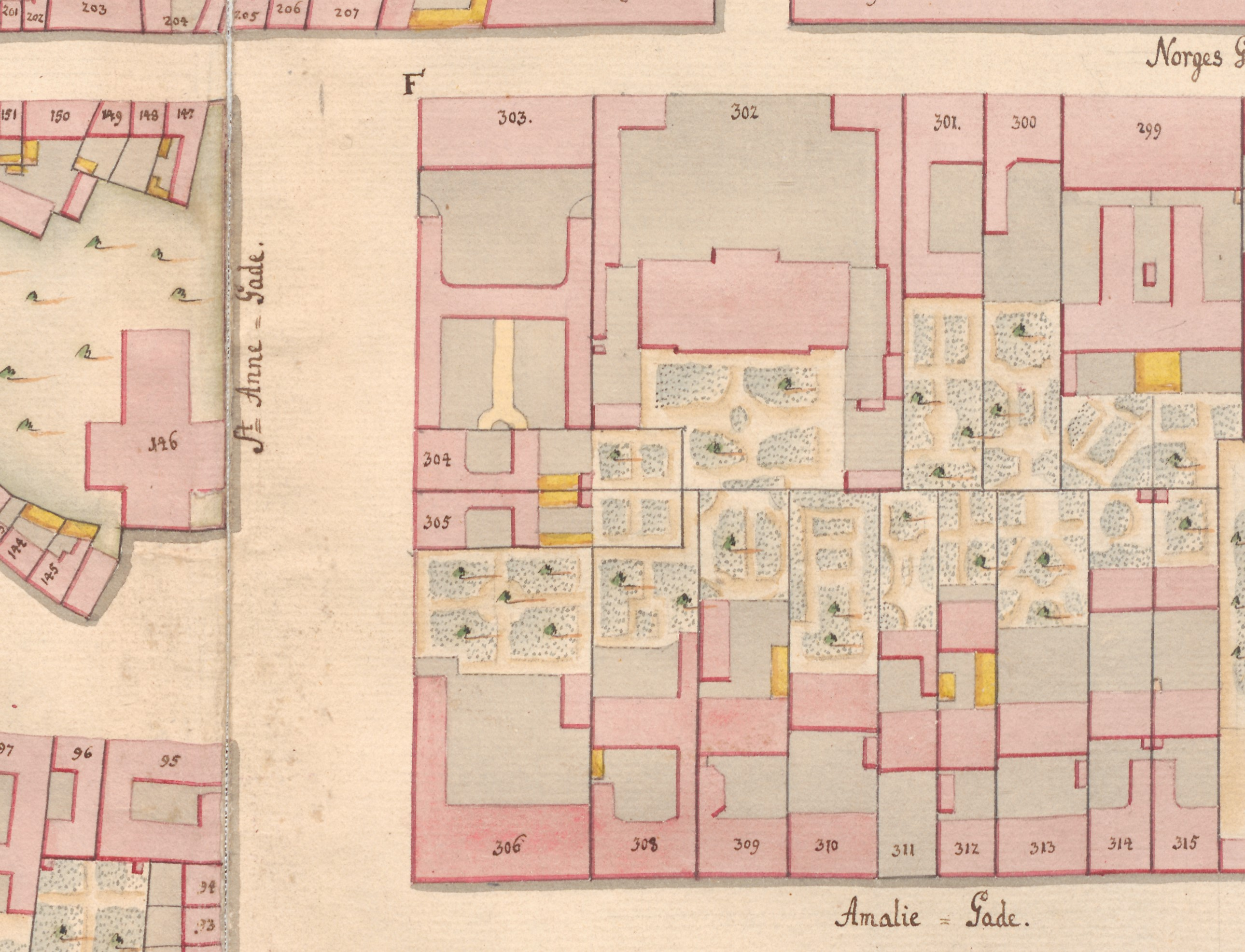
No. 305 seen on a detail from Christian Gedde's map of St. Ann's East Quarter, 1757.

Sankt Annæ Plads 9 and the adjacent building at No. 7 were constructed by master mason Niels Rasmussen Engerslev and master carpenter Peder Rasmussen Møller in 1750 as some of the first buildings in the new Frederiksstaden district. The buildings were constructed according to mirrored designs by Niels Eigtved who also created the master plan for the fashionable new district. In the new cadastre of 1756, the property was listed as No. 71 VV, On Christian Gedde's map of St. Ann's East Quarter, it is marked as No. 305.

=== Lars Wilder and Garnison's Workhouse ===
In the new cadastre of 1806, the property was listed as No. 111. It was then owned by Lars Wilder. The former owner of a shipyard at Wilders Plads in Christianshavn, he had acquired the property on Sankt Annæ Plads after selling the shipyard to the Danish Asiatic Company in 1803. Wilder remained unmarried and had no children. He left most of his estate to charity. He most likely endowed his property on Sankt Annæ Plads to the city's Poor Authority (fattigvæsnet), since it was later put into use by them as a new home for Garnison's Workhouse and Girls' School.

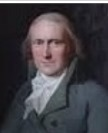
Peder Wilchen Heiberg

At the time of the 1834 census, the property also provided a home for a total of 31 indigent women, mostly elderly widows, in the care of the city's Poor Authority. Twelve of them resided on the second floor of the side wing, another ten resided in the rear wing, and the remaining nine resided in the basement of the side wing. Peder Wilchen Heiberg (1778–1842), inspector of Garnison's Workhouse and a secretary for the Poor Authority's police force, resided in the intermediate wing (Mellembygningen) with his wife Elise Kristine (née Schrøder), their Marie Lang, a teacher at the girls' school (Arbejdskolen), resided on the ground floor with her 22-year-old daughter and an 18-year-old niece. Hans Lassen, the concierge, resided in the basement with his wife Charlotte Amalia (née Steen) and their seven children (aged two to 22).

Garnison's Workhouse and Girls' School was closed in 1839.

=== Later history ===
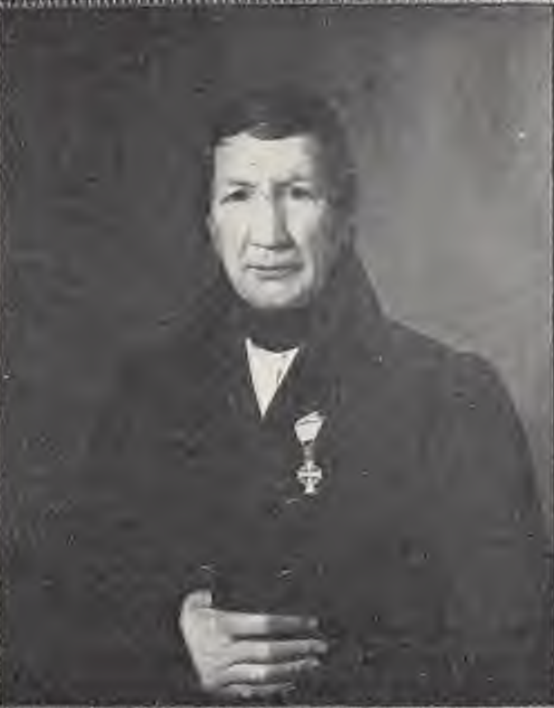
Thomas Blom

At the time of the 1840 census, No. 111 was home to just one household. Peter Petersen, a policeman in the Poor Authority's police force, resided in the basement with his wife Ane Margrethe Petersen and the 21-year-old seamstress Caroline Adolphine Petersen. The reason for the low number of residents was that the building was being refurbished by the master mason Thomas Blom.

The composer and educator Johan Christian Gebauer was among the residents of the building in 1842.

The property was by 1845 owned by Wilhelm Carl Jacobsen (1795–1869), a retailer of gallantry items (gifts, etc.). He resided in one of the apartments with his wife Julie Wilhelmine Marie Jacobsen (née Nathanson, 1811–1881), their five children (aged one to 12), a housekeeper (husjomfru), three maids and a wet nurse. Christian Albrecht Bluhme, then-director of Generaltoldkammeret og Kommercekollegiet, resided in another apartment with his wife Rasmine Bluhme (née Wandel), their four children (aged two to 12), a housekeeper (husjomfru), a male servant and two maids. Carl Ludvig Scheel (1803–1870), a chamberlain at the Queen Dowager's court, resided in the building with his wife Sophie Sheelnmée von Buchwaldt, (1814–1880), their three-year-old daughter Marie Sheel and three maids. Ludvig Esskildsen, a division quarter master, resided in the building with his wife Laura Anina Elisa (née Kofod), their one-year-old daughter Lodovica Angolica Esskildsen, a housekeeper (husjomfru) and the lodger Charles Jules Paul Frederic de Coninck (a grandson of Jean de Coninck). Else Margrethe Rasmussen, a widow shopkeeper, resided in the building with three of her children (aged 32 to 38) and two grandchildren (aged 14 and 16).

At the time of the 1850 census, No. 111 was again home to some new residents. Ludvig Adolph Hecksher (1804–1874), a ship broker, resided on the ground floor with his wife Ida Hecksher (née Bang), their four children (aged two to 11), the 26-year-old home tutor Theodor Schaldemose, a male servant and three maids. Chr. Bille Brahe, who was acting amtmand on Funen, lived there with them when he was in Copenhagen. Wilhelm Jacobsen was still residing with his family in the apartment on the first floor. Jens Christian Stangerup, the city's second vice-mayor, resided on the ground floor with his wife Marie Stangerup, their 26-year-old daughter Dorthea Zustgaard and one maid. Ludvig Eskildsen resided with his family in the intermediate wing. Margrethe Kragelund, a 46-year-old widow, resided with two younger sisters in the basement. Peder Hansen, a coachman, resided in the building with his wife Dorthea Hansen (née Lassen) and their five-year-old daughter.

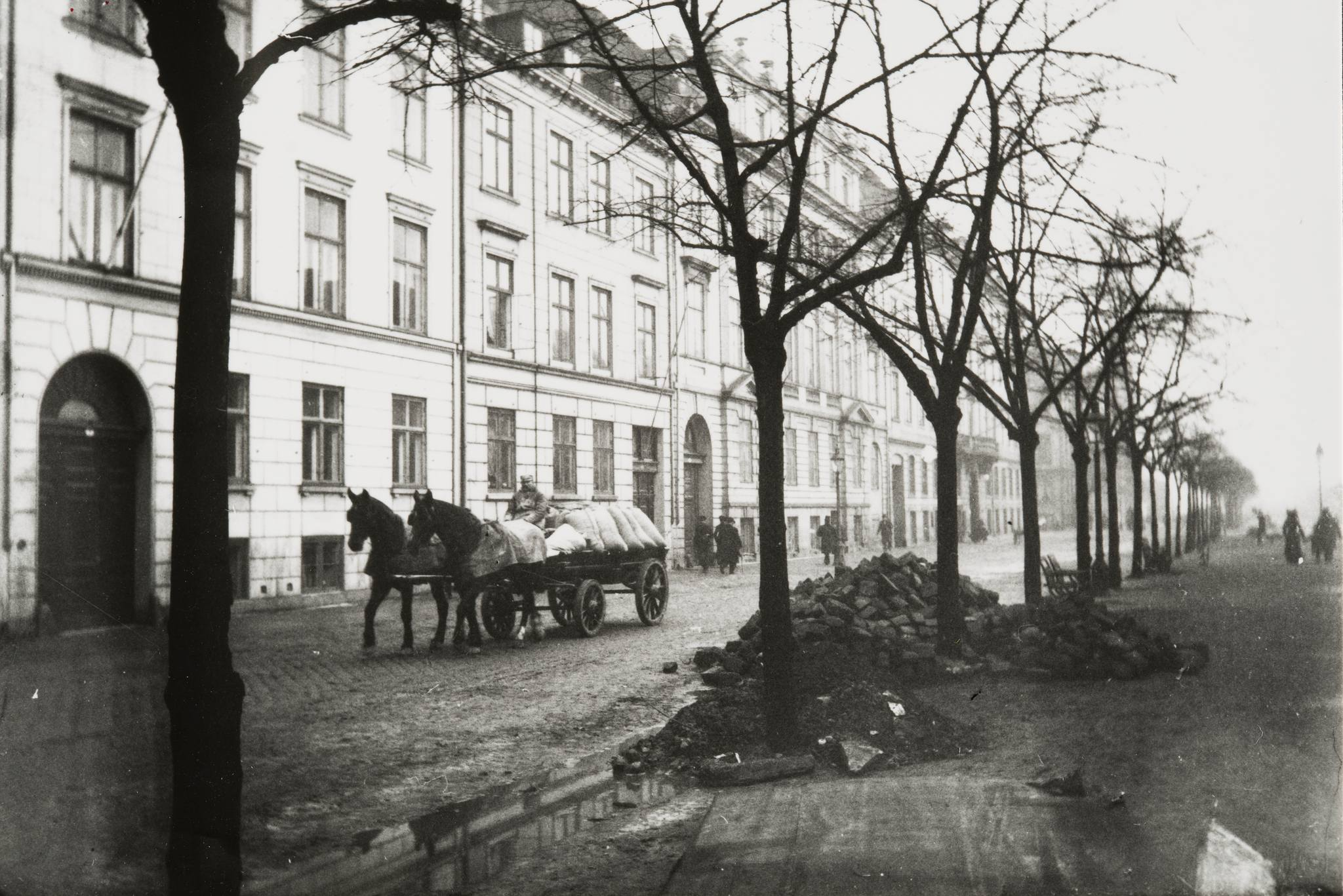
A carriage parked outside the building.

C. E. Fenger (1814–1884), a professor of medicine at the University of Copenhagen, resided in one of the apartments from 1852 to 1865. August Goll (1866–1936), a lawyer (rigsadvokat), resided in the building from 1932. Peter Adler Alberti, known for the Alberti Scandal, resided in the building in the later years of his life.

== Architecture ==
Sankt Annæ Plads is a three-winged complex, constructed in brick with three storeys over a walk-out basement, consisting of a four-bay wide main wing fronting the street, an eight-bay side wing and a rear wing. The building is topped by a Mansard roof. The dressed facade features a two-bay median risalit and is finished with shadow joints, a belt course above the ground floor and a modillioned cornice. The outer windows on the first floor are topped by hood moulds.

== Today ==
The building is today owned by E/F Skt. Annæ Plads 9. In November 2021 a 319-square metre condominium in the building sold for DKK 32.5 million, corresponding to a price per square metre of DKK 101,800, an all-time price record for Copenhagen.
