= Ryan, U.S. Virgin Islands =

Human settlement in United States Virgin Islands, United States of America

Coordinates: 17°43′41″N 064°40′59″W

Ryan is a populated place in Anna's Hope Village on the island of Saint Croix in United States Virgin Islands. It is about 45 mi (72 km) south of Charlotte Amalie, the country's capital city.

== See also ==
- Castle Nugent National Historic Site
- Christiansted National Historic Site
- List of islands of the United States Virgin Islands
