= Castle Nugent National Historic Site =

Proposed addition to the US National Park System in the Virgin Islands

Coordinates: 17°43′0″N 64°40′48″W

Castle Nugent National Historic Site is a proposed addition to the National Park System of the United States, located on the southern coast of St. Croix, Virgin Islands. If established, the site would preserve a Caribbean cultural landscape that spans more than 300 years of agricultural use, significant archeological resources, mangrove forests, endangered sea turtle nesting beaches, an extensive barrier coral reef system, and other outstanding natural features. In order to maintain an important feature of the cultural landscape of the historic site, the Secretary of the Interior would be authorized to lease to the University of the Virgin Islands certain lands within the boundary of the historic site for the purpose of continuing the university's operation breeding Senepol cattle. The enabling legislation passed the House of Representatives on January 27, 2010.
