= Sankt Annæ Plads 7 =

Building in Copenhagen, Denmark

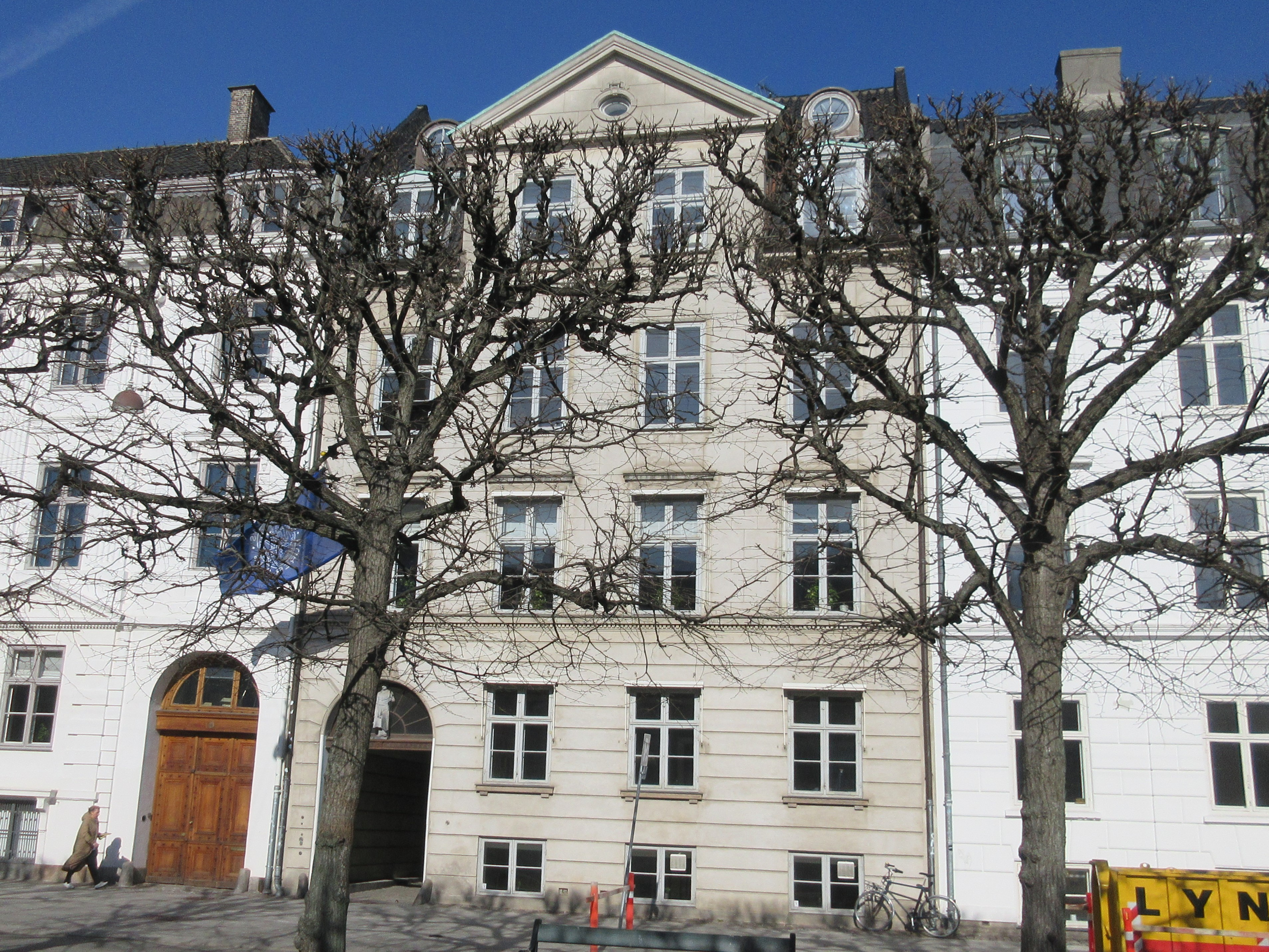
- Interactive map of the Sankt Annæ Plads 7 area

General information
- Location: Copenhagen, Denmark
- Coordinates: 55°40′55.88″N 12°35′23.93″E
- Completed: 1750

Design and construction
- Architect: Nicolai Eigtved

Sankt Annæ Plads 7 is a listed property on Sankt Annæ Plads in the Frederiksstaden neighbourhood of central Copenhagen, Denmark. The Copenhagen Masons' Guild has been based in the building since 1929. It was listed on the Danish registry of protected buildings and places in 1932.

== History ==
=== 18th century ===
The building was together with the adjacent building at No. 9 constructed by master mason Niels Rasmussen Engerslev and master carpenter Peder Rasmussen Møller in 1750. The two lots were both 20 alen wide and 10 alen deep and located exactly midway between Bredgade (then Norgesgade) and the new street Amaliegade. The two buildings were constructed to identical but mirrored designs by court master builder Niels Eigtved, who had also created the masterplan for the new Frederiksstaden district. The house to the left (No. 7) was owned by Engerslev and the one to the right was owned by Nøller. The first floor was rented out to colonel and later general Samuel Christoph Gedde (1681-1766), who served as chief of the Danish fortifications from 1739 until 1763. He lived there until his death in 1766. Gedde's wife died in 1751 but it is not known whether it was before or after the move to Sankt Annæ Plads from their previous home in Sankt Peders Stræde. They had 10 children, including Christian Gedde.

Engerslev's widow Else was after her husband's death married to court master mason Erasmus Frederik Platz. Their property was listed as No. 71 UU in St. Ann's East Quarter in the new cadastre of 1756. In 1792, Platz heightened the side wing with one storey to the same height as the front wing. Each of the floors was at the same time converted into a separate apartment. Platz and his wife lived on the ground floor.

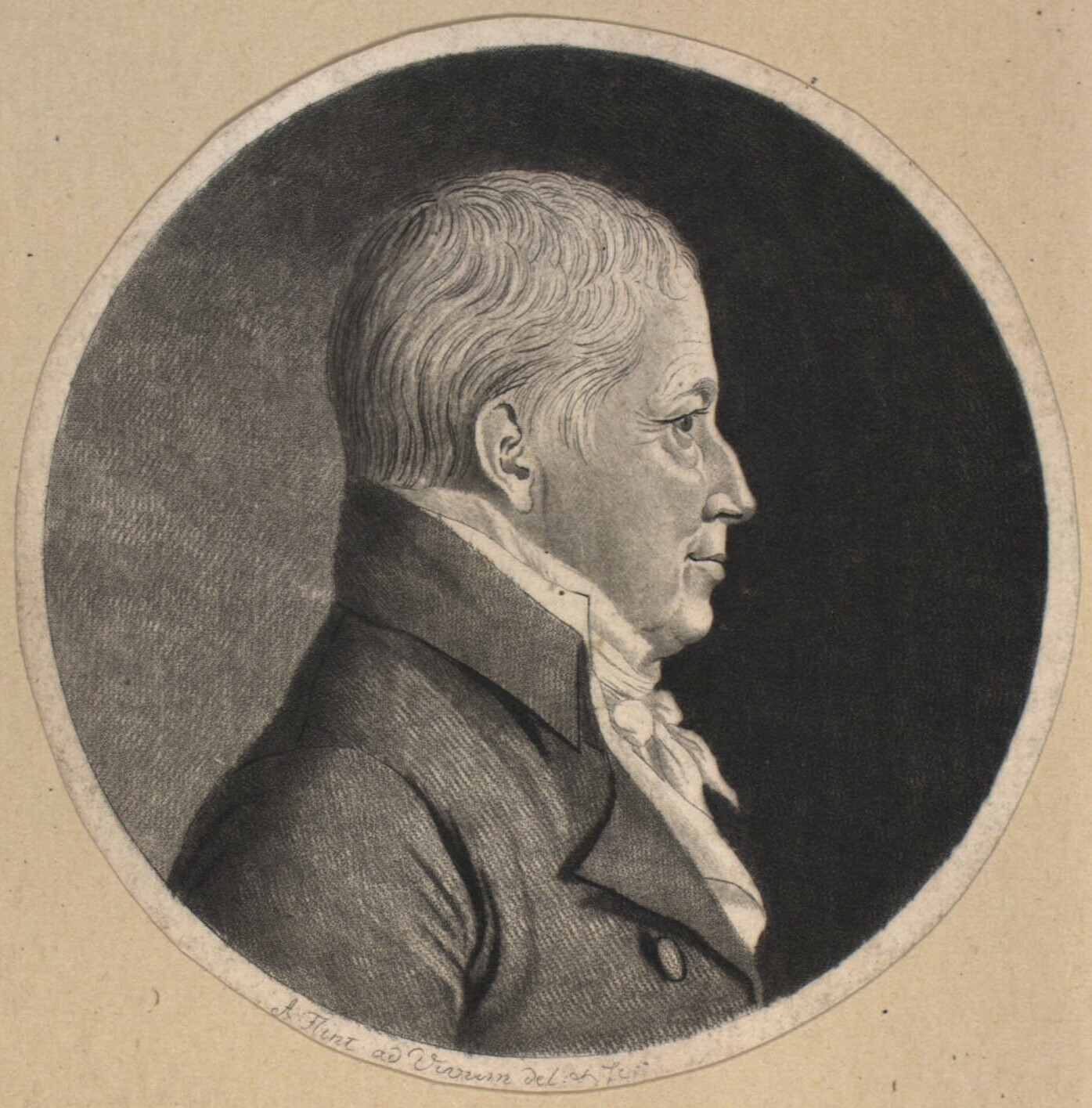
Georg Daniel von der Pahlen.

The first floor was still rented out at the time of the 1787 census. The new tenant was Major-General Clemens August Haxthausen (1743-1683). He lived there with a male servant, a coachman, a caretaker and a maid.

Else Platz kept the property following her husband's death in 1792. On 22 August 1797, she sold the property to merchant (grosserer) Georg Daniel von der Pahlen (1763-1841) for 15.500 Danish rigsdaler. She also kept her ground floor apartment with an annual rent of 150 rigsdaler (from Easter 177798). The new owner occupied the first-floor apartment.

In October 1799, Pahlen sold the property. He later owned the property Købmagergade No. 19 (now Købmagergade 18). In 1823, he moved to Frederikshavn.

=== Wuldem and Kraft, 1799–1827 ===
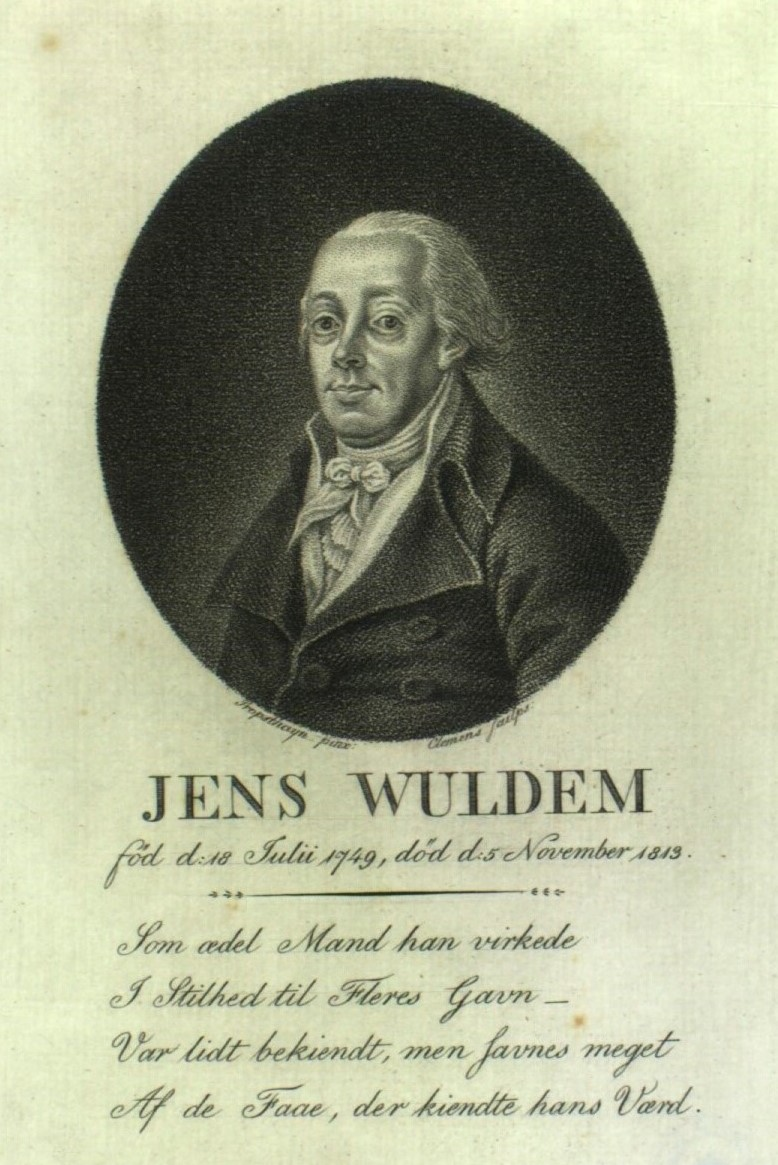
Jens Wildem

In October 1799, Pahlen sold the property to Jens Wulden. In 1797, Wuldem had returned to Copenhagen after spending most of his life in the Danish colonies. Born in Copenhagen on 18 July 1749, he had come to the Danish Gold Coast at the age of 12. He later continued to the Danish West Indies on board a slave ship. Aged 17, he was appointed as supercargo of a ship to China. He later completed two more journeys to China. He was later sent to Patna by the Danish Asiatic Company. In 1781, he was appointed as 1st Assistant at the Danish factory at Frederiksnagore. In 1774–75, he visited Copenhagen. During his stay in Copenhagen he was married to Anna Giessing with whom he in 1786 returned to Frederiksnagore. His wife died in 1793. In 1792, he succeeded Scavenius as 1st Factor in Frederiksnagore. In 1797, he moved back to Copenhagen. In 1811, he married his housekeeper (née Calussen). He died on 5 November 1813.

Wuldem's property was home to three households at the time of the 1801 census. One of them consisted of Wuldem. Another consisted of sea captain Hans Keyser and assistant N. Nielsen. A third consisted of sea captain Andreas Stockgaard, his wife Bertha Marie (née Lund), one daughter and one maid.

Wulden's property was listed as No. 110 in the new cadastre of 1806. In 1811, he sold it to warehouse manager Christian Kraft. It is unclear whether Kraft ever had his home in the building. In 1812, Wuldem's widow was still residing in the ground floor apartment. N. Nielsen (cf. the 1801 census) was still residing in the first floor apartment. V. Schou, a kammerråd, was a resident of the building in 1819.

=== Ryan and Treschow families, 1828–1828 ===
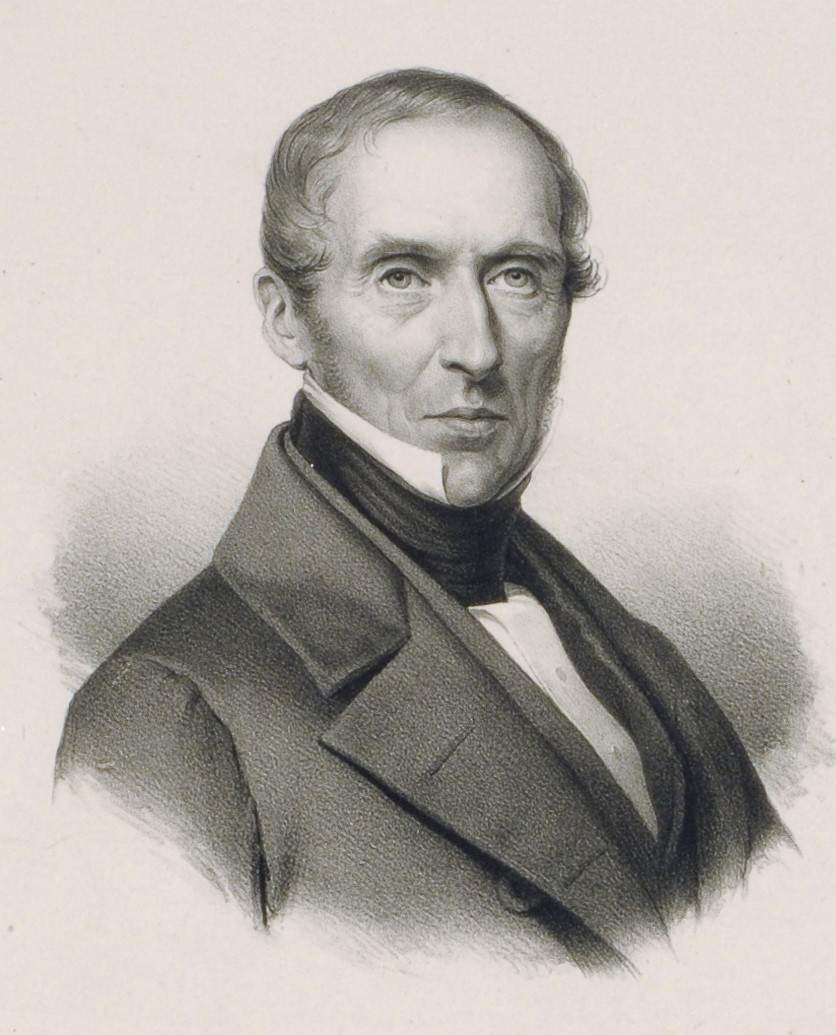
George Ryan

In 1828, Kraft sold the property to the Irish-born merchant and ship-owner George Ryan (1783-1861). Ryan remained unmarried but was by 1734 residing in the building with his 19-year old son Charles Ryan (1815-), who worked as an office clerk in his father's firm, as well as four male servants and two maids. At the time of the 1840 census, Ryan was listed as "administrator" (probably consul) of the North African Free States. George and Charles Ryan were by then residing in the building with warehouse manager Andreas Johan Hansen, a coachman, a housekeeper, two male servants and two maids.

By 1850, Charles Ryan had married and become the father of a one-year-old girl.

George Ryan outlived his son. His property was upon his own death in 1861 therefore passed to his granddaughters Catharina (Kate) Ryan (1849–1914) and Georgina Ryan (c. 1851–). Catharina Ryan was later married to Christian Rosenkilde Treschow, a diplomat and the owner of Frydendal Manor at Golbæk. Sankt Annæ Plads 7 was ceded to Christian Rosenkilde Treschow and his mother-in-law in 1881. Christian Treshow was the sole owner of the building from 1792. In 1915, it passed to hofjægermester Henry Treshow. On his death, it passed to his widow Engelke Treschow (née Wulff). The Italian embassy was briefly based in the building in 1026. The Portuguese consulate was based on the ground floor in 1027-29. The actor Carl Alstrup resided in the first floor apartment. The actress Bodil Ipsen lived in the one-storey building in the courtyard. Harriet Heide (née Block), widow of the businessman Axel Heide, was for a while also a resident of the building around this time.

=== 20th century ===
Copenhagen Masons' Guild purchased the building in 1928. It was subsequently put through a major renovation. The Copenhagen Masons' Guild inaugurated its new premises in 1929.

== Architecture ==
The building consists of three storeys over a high cellar and is four bays wide. The two-bay wall dormer dates from 1929.

== Gallery ==
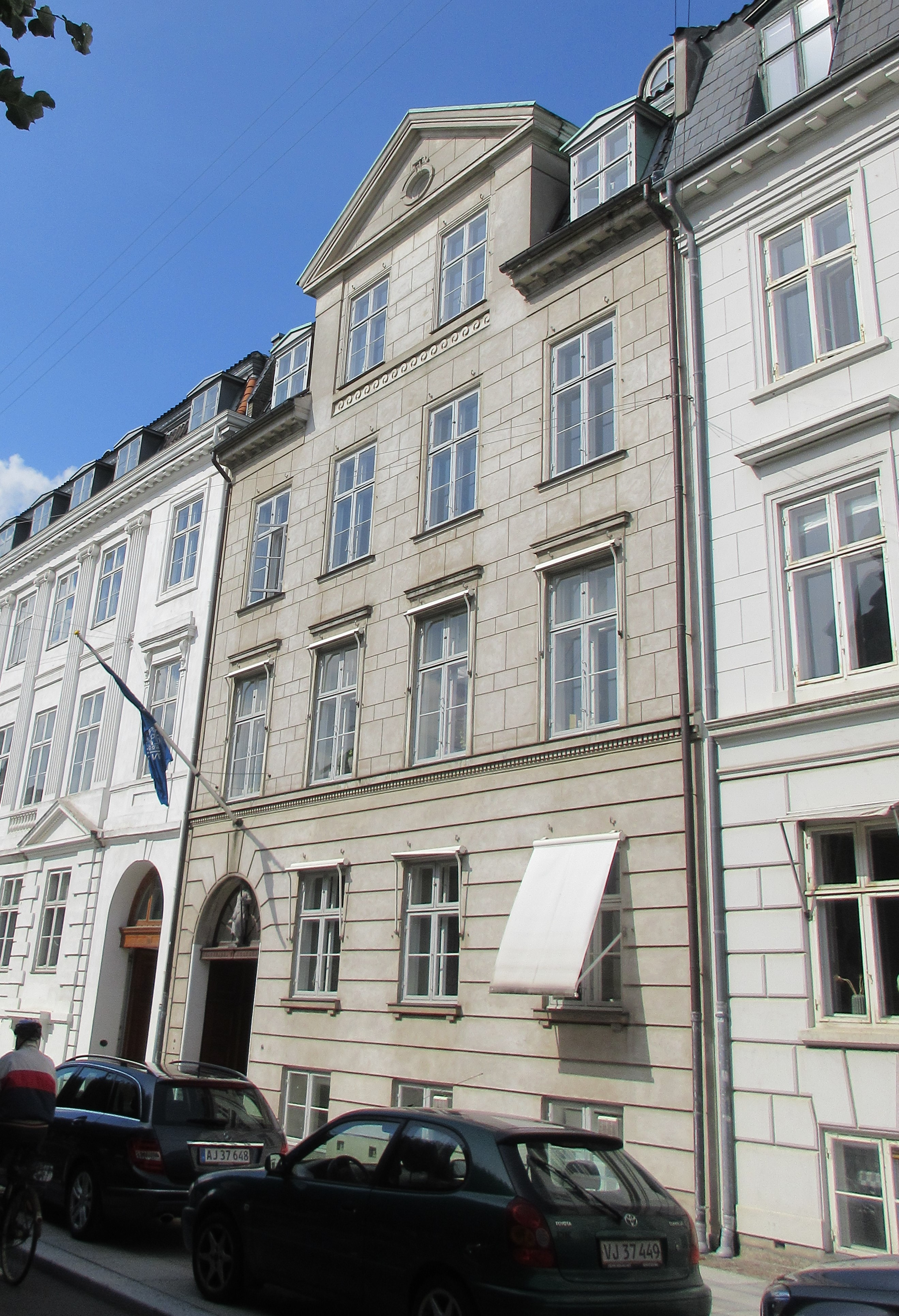

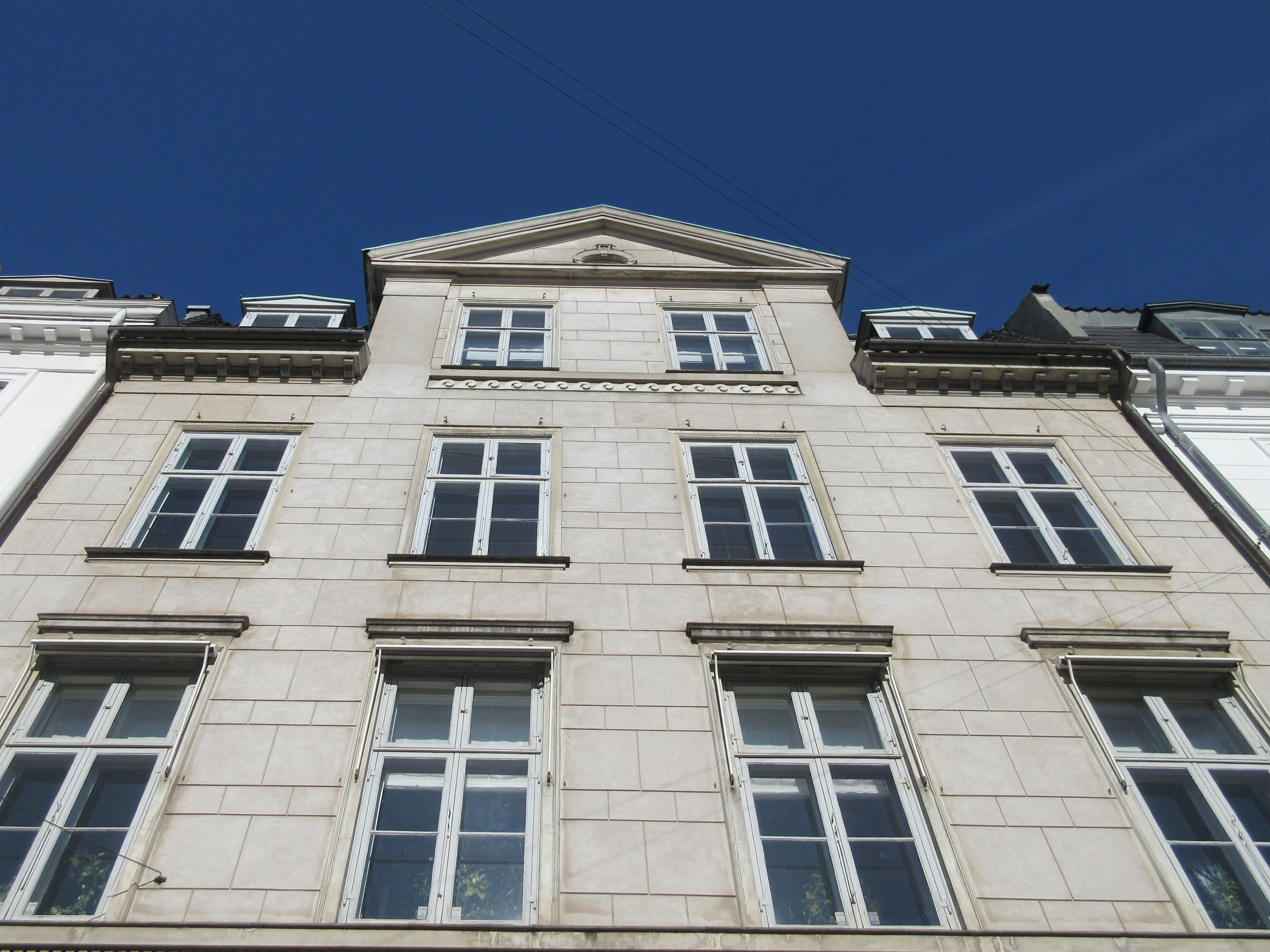
The facade

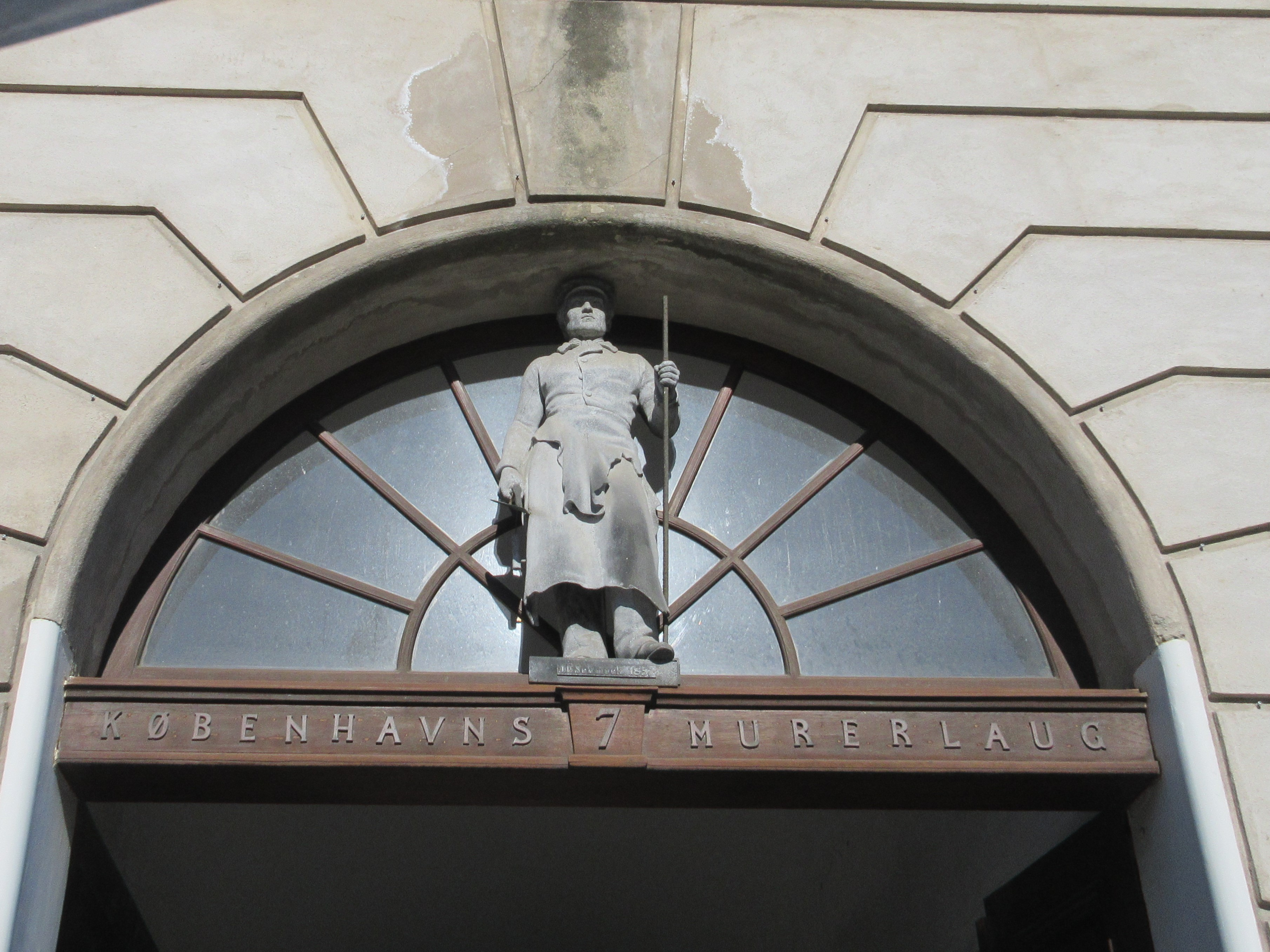
The lunette of the gateway

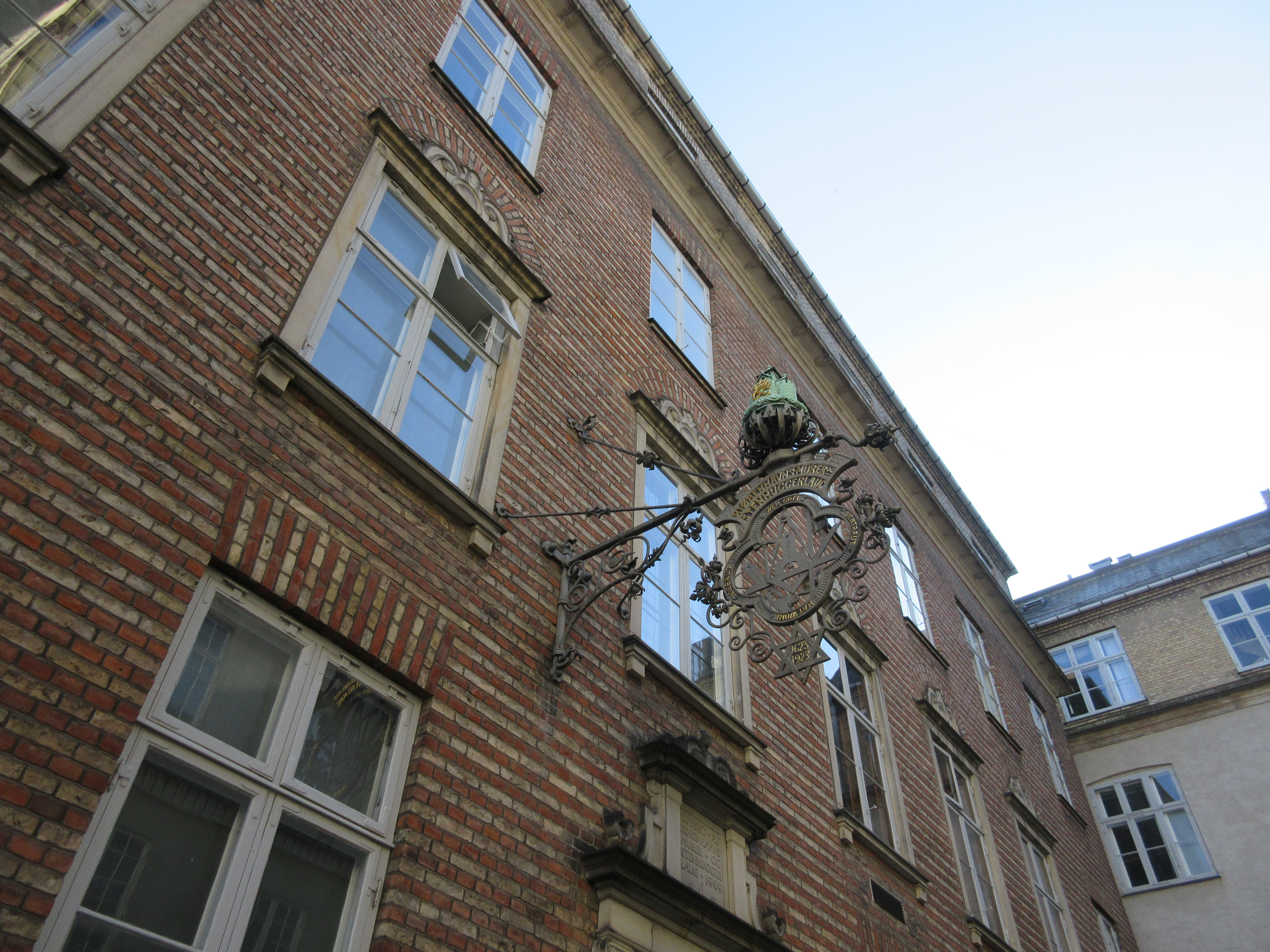
The side wing viewed from the courtyard

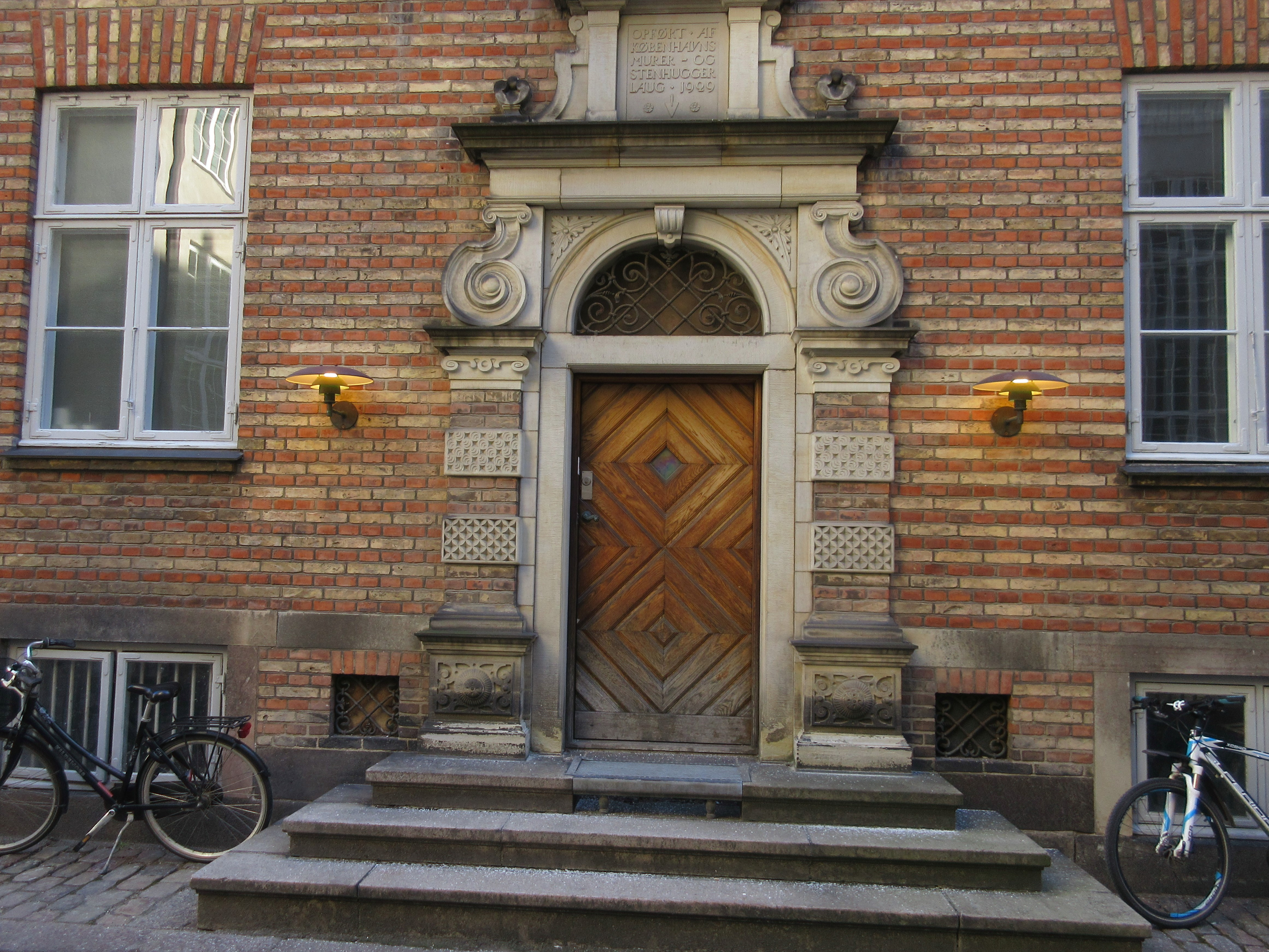
Door in the side wing

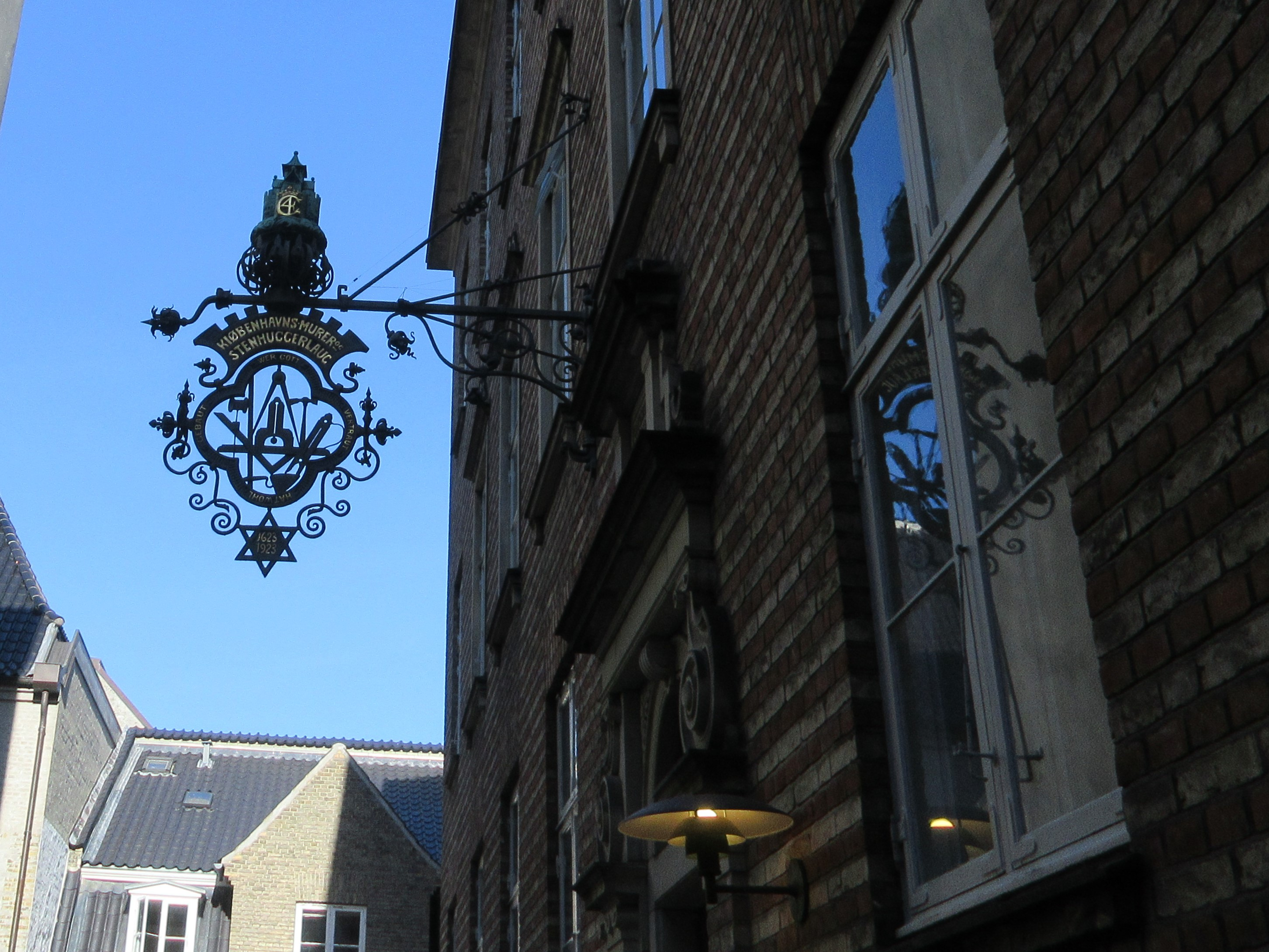
Sign

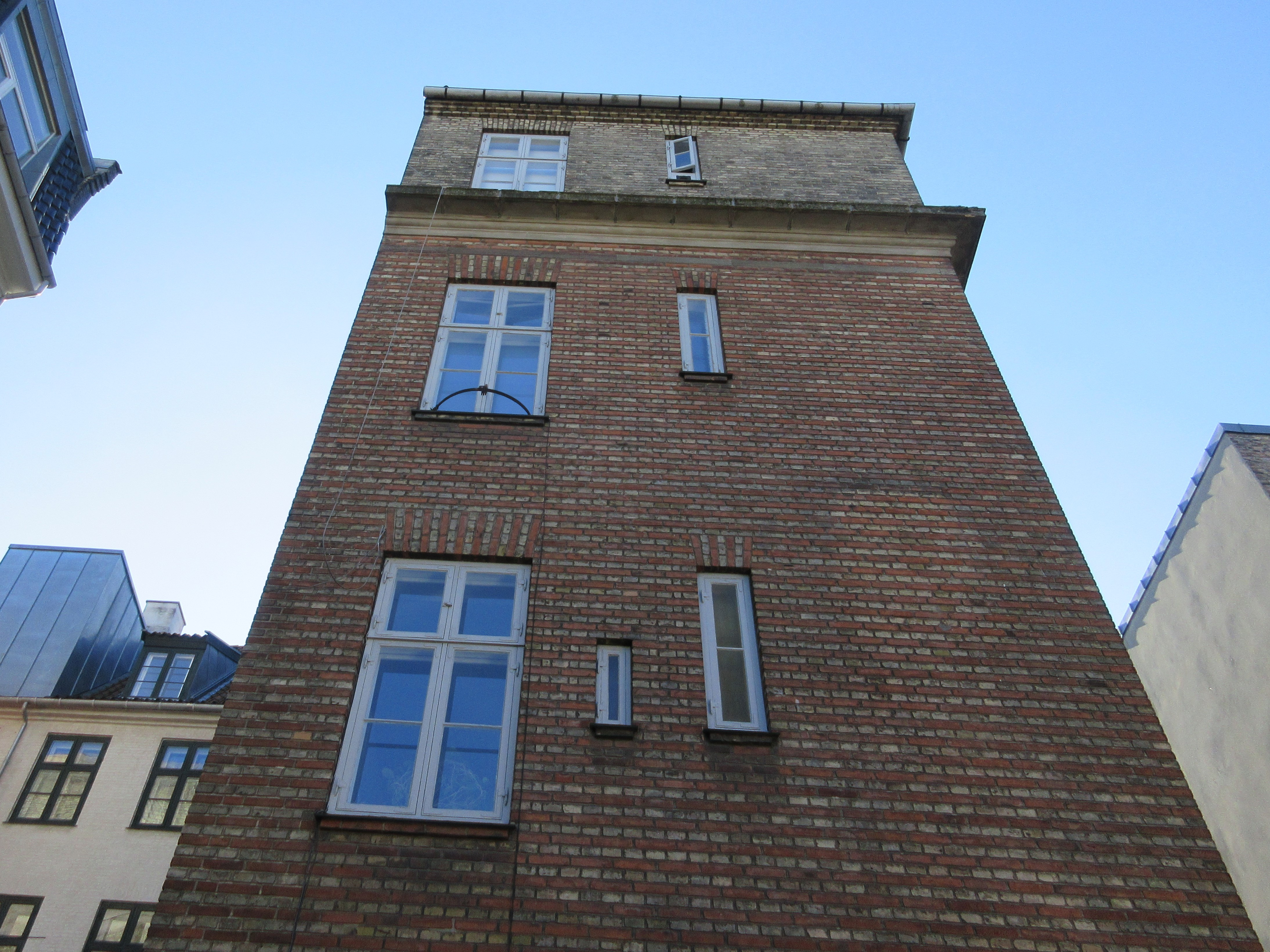
Gable of the side wing
