= Senepol =

Cattle breed

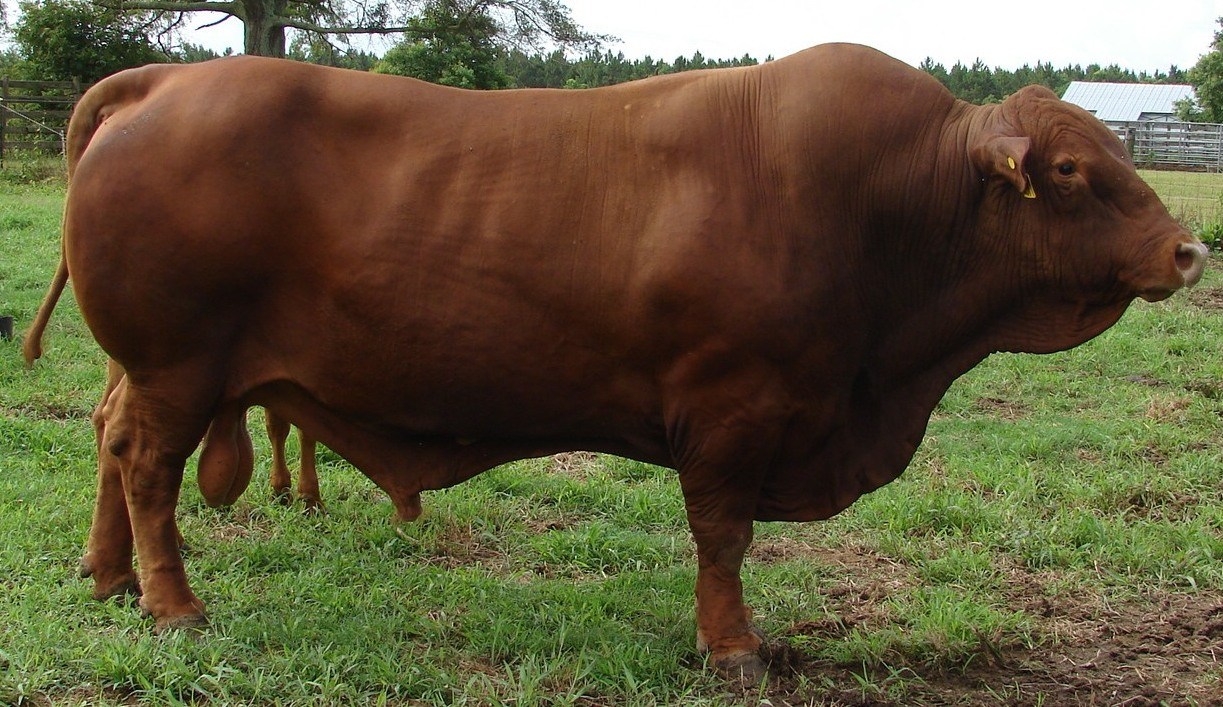
A Senepol bull

The Senepol breed of beef cattle was developed on the Caribbean Island of St. Croix. It has long been thought that Senepol originated from just crosses between N'Dama cattle, imported in the late 19th century, and Red Poll cattle, but it is actually an admixed breed that consists of Red Poll, N'Dama, Criola and a trace amount of Zebu. The Senepol breed combines characteristics of heat tolerance and insect resistance with the docile nature, good meat, and high milk production of the Red Poll. They are polled, short haired, and colored red, black or brown.

== Breed history ==
Being better suited to the island's climatic conditions than European breeds, it was reported that 60 heifers and two bulls of the N'Dama Petite breed were imported to St. Croix from Senegal in 1860 by George Elliot. This became the nucleus of the N'Dama cattle herd on St. Croix and by 1889, Henry C. Nelthropp, at the Granard Estates, was one of the largest N'Dama breeders with 250 purebred cattle. In 1918 Henry's son, Bromley, bought a Red Poll bull from Trinidad (which originated in England) to improve the cows' milking ability and remove their long horns. Two of this bull's sons were used as herd sires. In 1942 another Red Poll bull was purchased, this time from St. Thomas, and two locally raised purebred Red Poll cows were added to the herd.

The admixed cattle were selected for solid red color, natural polling and heat tolerance. These offspring were dispersed to four main herds on the island. The name Senepol was adopted in 1954 and a breed registry was established in the late 1960s. Aided by the United States Department of Agriculture the College of the Virgin Islands Extension Service began on farm performance testing in 1976. In 1977 22 cows were taken to the United States and the breed has since spread across the southern states. There are now more than 500 breeders with more than 14,000 registered cattle. They are also found in Australia, South Africa, Botswana, Namibia, Venezuela, Mexico, Paraguay, Philippines, Zimbabwe, Brazil, Puerto Rico, Dominican Republic and Bolivia.

== Genetic characterization ==
However, genetic characterization using high throughput SNP genotyping recently demonstrated that the Senepol genome contains crosses between European taurine (such as Red Poll) with some Zebu influence. The study showed that genetic samples of Senepol DNA collected from four different regions of Venezuela contained an average of 89% European taurine ancestry (ranging from 66–95%), 10.4% Zebu ancestry (ranging from 4–33%) and 0.6% African taurine ancestry (ranging from 0–4.1%). Among the African taurine breeds is the N'Dama breed from West Africa.

== Disease and insect resistance ==
USDA research indicates that Senepol have greater immune response when compared to other beef breeds. This is likely due to the Bos indicus influence in Senepol, and is also aided by generations of natural selection being applied on the island of St. Croix.

In the 1950s, with sugar cane becoming less economic, the United States Department of Agriculture put resources into the application of scientific breeding to Nelthropp Senepol under Richard Marshall Bond.
